= Salahdine Parnasse =

French mixed martial artist and boxer (born 1997)

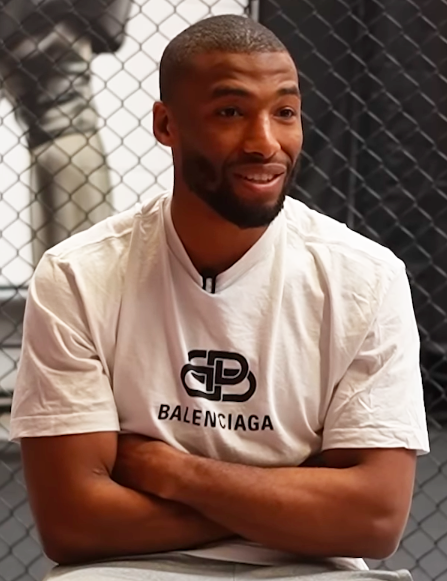
- Parnasse during an interview in 2023
- Born: Salah-Dine Parnasse; December 4, 1997 (age 28); Aubervilliers, Île-de-France, France
- Native name: صلاح الدين بارناس
- Other names: Salahdine Parnasse
- Nickname: Lion of Atlas
- Nationality: French; Moroccan
- Height: 5 ft 8 in (173 cm)
- Weight: 155 lb (70 kg; 11 st 1 lb)
- Division: Featherweight (2015-present); Lightweight (2017-present); Welterweight (2023); Super welterweight (Boxing, 2025-present)
- Reach: 73.2 in (186 cm)
- Style: Boxing
- Fighting out of: Aubervilliers, France (MMA); Les Mureaux, France (boxing)
- Team: Atch Academy (MMA, 2008-present); BAM L’Héritage (boxing, 2025-present)
- Years active: 2015–present (MMA); 2025–present (boxing)

Professional boxing record
- Total: 1
- Wins: 1
- By knockout: 1
- Losses: 0

Mixed martial arts record
- Total: 26
- Wins: 24
- By knockout: 9
- By submission: 7
- By decision: 8
- Losses: 2
- By knockout: 1
- By decision: 1

Amateur record
- Total: 2
- Wins: 2
- By knockout: 2
- Losses: 0

Other information
- Website: projektparnasse.com
- Boxing record from BoxRec
- Mixed martial arts record from Sherdog

Salah-Dine Parnasse (Arabic: صلاح الدين بارناس; born December 4, 1997) is a French professional mixed martial artist and boxer. He currently competes in the Lightweight division of the Ultimate Fighting Championship (UFC). He formerly competed in the Featherweight and Lightweight divisions of Konfrontacja Sztuk Walki (KSW), where he was the KSW Lightweight Champion, and the two-time KSW Featherweight Champion. He held the lightweight title until his departure, and he was the promotions’ fourth two-division champion in history. Parnasse has also competed in Most Valuable Promotions (MVP), and 100% Fight.

== Background and early life ==
Salah-Dine Parnasse was born on December 4, 1997, in Aubervilliers, Île-de-France, France. He was born to a Guadeloupean father, who was stationed in the country’s military, and a Moroccan mother. He started training mixed martial arts around the age of 11, at the Atch Academy in Aubervillers.

== Mixed martial arts career ==
=== Amateur career ===
Before turning professional at the age of 17, Parnasse had two amateur fights.

Salahdine faced Amar Akir at 100% Fight 23 - Into The Cage, on July 19 of 2014. He won the fight via TKO in the second round, due to a doctor’s stoppage.

He fought Antonin Hardy at 100% Fight 24 - Punishment, on January 31, 2015. He won the fight in the second round by TKO, due to punches.

=== Early career ===
Parnasse faced Jordan Berger in his professional debut, at 100% Fight - Contenders 29, on June 20, 2015. He won the fight in the second round by submission, due to an arm-triangle choke.

Parnasse faced Helder Fernandes at 100% Fight - Contenders 30, on October 31 of 2015. He won the fight via submission in the first round, due to a rear-naked choke. Later in the same day, he fought Mathieu Guinard. He won the fight via submission in the first round, due to a rear-naked choke.

Parnasse fought William Gomis at 100% Fight 27 - Last Man Standing, on February 4, 2016. He won the fight via unanimous decision.

==== Exhibition bouts ====
In his exhibition debut, he faced Tenglige at WKFCMC - The King of Fighting 2016: France vs. China, on June 25, 2016. The fight ended in a unanimous draw.

As a rematch, Salahdine faced Tenglige for the second time, in a 4-round, three-minute exhibition fight, at WKFCMC - Elite Series 2: Europe vs. China, on November 19, 2016. He won the fight by unanimous decision.

==== Return to professional fighting ====
Parnasse faced José Verdugo at KFWC - Kung Fu World Cup 2017: Day 2, on January 25, 2015. He won the fight by TKO in the third round, due to punches.

Parnasse fought Suleiman Bouhata at 100% Fight 29 - Killer Instinct, on March 17, 2017. He won the fight via unanimous decision. Later in the day, he faced Morgan Charrière. He won the fight by unanimous decision.

Parnasse fought Hyram Rodriguez at EBD 2 - European Beatdown 2, on October 14 of 2017. He won the fight by submission, due to an anaconda choke.

=== KSW career ===
Parnasse made his KSW debut against Łukasz Rajewski at KSW 41, on December 23, 2017. He won the fight by unanimous decision.

Salahdine faced former Featherweight champion Artur Sowiński at KSW 43, on April 14, 2018. He won the fight via unanimous decision.

Parnasse fought former Featherweight champion Marcin Wrzosek at KSW 46, on December 1, 2018. He won the fight by unanimous decision.

==== First reign as KSW Featherweight Champion ====
Parnasse faced Roman Szymański for the interim KSW Featherweight Championship, at KSW 49, on April 27 of 2019. He won the fight via TKO in the second round, by punches. He won the interim KSW Featherweight Championship in the process.

While holding the interim title, concurrent KSW two-weight division champion Mateusz Gamrot vacated the featherweight title to focus on the Lightweight division, as he was champion in the weight class. Parnasse was promoted as the undisputed KSW Featherweight Champion on May 17, 2019.

Parnasse was scheduled to make his first title defense against Ivan Buchinger at KSW 52, on December 7, 2019. He won the fight via unanimous decision.

==== Losing the Featherweight title ====
Two years later, Parnasse was set to defend his title for the second time, against Daniel Torres at KSW 58, on January 30, 2021. He suffered his first professional loss, losing the fight via knockout, due to a forearm strike, in the first round. Therefore, he lost the undisputed KSW Featherweight Championship.

Parnasse faced Filip Pejić at KSW 61, on June 5, 2021. He won the fight by submission, due to a rear-naked choke. Parnasse won the Submission of the Night award after the pay-per-view concluded.

==== Second reign as KSW Featherweight Champion ====
Parnasse fought champion Daniel Torres for the KSW Featherweight Championship, at KSW 65, on December 18, 2021. He won the fight by unanimous decision, winning back the KSW Featherweight Championship, and becoming the third two-time champion in KSW history.

Parnasse was scheduled to make his first title defense against Daniel Rutkowski, at KSW 68, on March 19, 2022. He won the fight by submission in the fourth round, via rear-naked choke.

==== Winning the KSW Lightweight Championship ====
Salahdine was scheduled to move up to the lightweight division and face concurrent KSW Lightweight Champion Marian Ziółkowski, at KSW 76, on November 12, 2022. However, Marian was withdrawn due to a knee injury, and was replaced by former Lightweight title challenger, Sebastian Rajewski for an interim KSW Lightweight Championship title fight. Parnasse won the fight via submission in the fourth round, due to a rear-naked choke. He became the interim KSW Lightweight Champion in the process.

Salahdine was scheduled for a second time to face concurrent KSW Lightweight Champion Marian Ziółkowski, at KSW 83, on June 3, 2023, in a title unification bout. However, Marian was withdrawn due to torn ligaments in his knee, and vacated the title to focus on recovering, minutes before the fight. On the day of the pay-per-view, Parnasse was promoted to the undisputed KSW Lightweight Champion.

==== KSW title wins and challenges ====
Parnasse was scheduled to make his second Featherweight title defense against interim Featherweight champion Robert Ruchała, at KSW 85, on August 19, 2023, in a title unification bout. He won the fight via knockout in the fourth round, due to a soccer kick to the body.

Parnasse challenged to face current Welterweight champion Adrian Bartosiński, at KSW 89, on December 16, 2023. He moved up in the process. He lost the fight by unanimous decision.

Parnasse faced concurrent interim Lightweight champion, Valeriu Mircea, at KSW 93, on April 6, 2024. The bout was held for title unification. He won the fight via first round knockout, by a head kick and punches.

Parnasse was scheduled to make his second Lightweight title defense against Wilson Varela at KSW 101, on December 20, 2024. He won the fight in the second round via TKO, due to punches.

Parnasse faced former Lightweight champion Marian Ziółkowski for his third Lightweight title defense. The bout was held at KSW 106, on May 10, 2025. He won the fight via TKO in the second round, due to punches.

Parnasse was scheduled to face Marcin Held for his fourth title defense at KSW 114, on January 17 of 2026. He won the fight by TKO in the second round, due to punches.

As a result of fighting outside of KSW, Parnasse lost his featherweight title on April 6, 2026, which he had not defended since 2023. At the same time, interim champion Patryk Kaczmarczyk was promoted to undisputed champion of the division. On April 18, 2026, Salahdine was released by KSW and his lightweight title was vacated in the process.

==== Most Valuable Promotions debut ====
Salahdine made his MVP MMA debut against Kenneth Cross at MVP MMA: Rousey vs. Carano, on May 16, 2026. He won the fight by technical knockout in the first round.

=== Ultimate Fighting Championship ===
On July 24, 2026, it was reported that Parnasse signed with the UFC. He made his debut against Dan Hooker in the main event on September 5, 2026, at UFC Fight Night 287. He won the fight by technical knockout in the first round. This fight earned him his first $100,000 Performance of the Night award.

== Boxing career ==
Parnasse made his professional boxing against former EBU Super-Lightweight Champion Franck Petitjean in a six-round, three minute fight at the Adidas Arena, in the XVIII^{e} arrondissement of Paris, on October 4, 2025. He won by knockout in the second round.

== Personal life ==
Salahdine identifies as a proud man of Guadeloupean and Moroccan heritage, citing in multiple interviews and articles that he is also of dual French and Moroccan citizenship.

== Championships and accomplishments ==
=== Mixed martial arts ===
- Konfrontacja Sztuk Walki
  - KSW Lightweight Championship (One time, former)
    - Four successful title defenses
  - KSW Featherweight Championship (Two times, former)
    - One successful title defense (first reign)
    - Two successful title defenses (second reign)
  - Interim KSW Lightweight Championship (One time)
  - Interim KSW Featherweight Championship (One time)
  - Performance of the Night (Two times) vs. Ivan Buchinger and Marcin Held
  - Submission of the Night (Two times) vs. Filip Pejić and Daniel Rutkowski
  - Knockout of the Night (One time) vs. Valeriu Mircea (KSW 93)
  - Fourth two-division champion in KSW history
- Ultimate Fighting Championship
  - Performance of the Night (One time) vs. Dan Hooker

== Mixed martial arts record ==
Professional record breakdown
26 matches	24 wins	2 losses
By knockout	9	1
By submission	7	0
By decision	8	1

Res.	Record	Opponent	Method	Event	Date	Round	Time	Location	Notes
Win	24–2	Dan Hooker	TKO (body kick and punches)	UFC Fight Night: Hooker vs. Parnasse	September 5, 2026	1	2:35	Paris, France	Performance of the Night.
Win	23–2	Kenneth Cross	TKO (punches)	MVP MMA: Rousey vs. Carano	May 16, 2026	1	4:18	Inglewood, California, United States	
Win	22–2	Marcin Held	TKO (punches)	KSW 114	January 17, 2026	2	3:35	Radom, Poland	Defended the KSW Lightweight Championship. Performance of the Night. Later vacated the title on April 18, 2026.
Win	21–2	Marian Ziółkowski	TKO (punches)	KSW 106	May 10, 2025	2	3:54	Lyon, France	Defended the KSW Lightweight Championship.
Win	20–2	Wilson Varela	TKO (punches)	KSW 101	December 20, 2024	2	1:00	Paris, France	Defended the KSW Lightweight Championship.
Win	19–2	Valeriu Mircea	KO (head kick and punches)	KSW 93	April 6, 2024	1	4:00	Paris, France	Defended and unified the KSW Lightweight Championship. Knockout of the Night.
Loss	18–2	Adrian Bartosiński	Decision (unanimous)	KSW 89	December 16, 2023	5	5:00	Gliwice, Poland	Welterweight debut. For the KSW Welterweight Championship.
Win	18–1	Robert Ruchała	KO (soccer kick to the body)	KSW 85	August 19, 2023	4	4:42	Nowy Sącz, Poland	Defended and unified the KSW Featherweight Championship. Later vacated the title on April 6, 2026.
Win	17–1	Sebastian Rajewski	Submission (rear-naked choke)	KSW 76	November 12, 2022	4	2:21	Grodzisk Mazowiecki, Poland	Won the interim KSW Lightweight Championship. Parnasse was promoted to undisputed champion at KSW 83.
Win	16–1	Daniel Rutkowski	Submission (rear-naked choke)	KSW 68	March 19, 2022	4	1:07	Radom, Poland	Defended the KSW Featherweight Championship. Submission of the Night.
Win	15–1	Daniel Torres	Decision (unanimous)	KSW 65	December 18, 2021	5	5:00	Gliwice, Poland	Won the vacant KSW Featherweight Championship. Torres missed weight (146.4 lb) and was stripped of the title. Only Parnasse was eligible to win the title.
Win	14–1	Filip Pejić	Submission (rear-naked choke)	KSW 61	June 5, 2021	2	4:14	Gdańsk, Poland	Submission of the Night.
Loss	13–1	Daniel Torres	KO (forearm strike)	KSW 58	January 30, 2021	1	1:49	Łódź, Poland	Lost the KSW Featherweight Championship.
Win	13–0	Ivan Buchinger	Decision (unanimous)	KSW 52	December 7, 2019	5	5:00	Gliwice, Poland	Defended the KSW Featherweight Championship. Performance of the Night.
Win	12–0	Roman Szymanski	TKO (punches)	KSW 48	April 27, 2019	2	3:40	Lublin, Poland	Won the interim KSW Featherweight Championship. Parnasse was promoted to undisputed champion on May 17, 2019.
Win	11–0	Marcin Wrzosek	Decision (unanimous)	KSW 46	December 1, 2018	3	5:00	Gliwice, Poland	
Win	10–0	Artur Sowiński	Decision (unanimous)	KSW 43	April 14, 2018	3	5:00	Wrocław, Poland	
Win	9–0	Lukasz Rajewski	Decision (unanimous)	KSW 41	December 23, 2017	3	5:00	Katowice, Poland	
Win	8–0	Hyram Rodriguez	Technical Submission (anaconda choke)	European Beatdown 2	October 14, 2017	1	0:00	Mons, Belgium	
Win	7–0	Morgan Charrière	Decision (unanimous)	100% Fight 29	March 17, 2017	3	5:00	Paris, France	Won the 100% Fight Featherweight Tournament.
Win	6–0	Suleiman Bouhata	Decision (unanimous)	100% Fight 29	March 17, 2017	3	5:00	Paris, France	Return to Featherweight. 100% Fight Featherweight Tournament Semifinal.
Win	5–0	José Verdugo	TKO (punches)	Kung Fu World Cup: Day 2	January 25, 2017	3	4:50	Ningxiang, China	Lightweight debut.
Win	4–0	William Gomis	Decision (unanimous)	100% Fight 27	February 4, 2016	3	5:00	Aubervilliers, France	
Win	3–0	Mathieu Guinard	Submission (rear-naked choke)	100% Fight: Contenders 30	October 31, 2015	2	2:06	Paris, France	Won the 100% Fight Featherweight Tournament.
Win	2–0	Helder Fernandes	Submission (rear-naked choke)	100% Fight: Contenders 30	October 31, 2015	1	1:36	Paris, France	100% Fight Featherweight Tournament Semifinal.
Win	1–0	Jordan Berger	Submission (arm-triangle choke)	100% Fight: Contenders 29	June 30, 2015	2	1:44	Aubervilliers, France	Featherweight debut.

=== Amateur martial arts record ===
Professional record breakdown
2 matches	2 wins	0 losses
By knockout	2	0
By submission	0	0
By decision	0	0

Res.	Record	Opponent	Method	Event	Date	Round	Time	Location	Notes
Win	2–0	Antonin Hardy	TKO (punches)	100% Fight 24	January 31, 2015	2	0:16	Paris, France	
Win	1–0	Amar Akir	TKO (corner stoppage)	100% Fight 23	July 19, 2014	2	2:14	Manage, Belgium	

=== Exhibition martial arts record ===
Exhibition record breakdown		
2 matches	1 win	0 losses
By knockout	0	0
By submission	0	0
By decision	1	0
Draws	1	

Res.	Record	Opponent	Method	Event	Date	Round	Time	Location	Notes
Win	1–0–1	Tenglige	Decision (unanimous)	World Kung Fu Combat Mixed Championship: Europe vs. China	November 19, 2016	4	3:00	Weihai, China	
Draw	0–0–1	Tenglige	Draw (unanimous)	World Kung Fu Combat Mixed Championship: France vs. China	June 25, 2016	4	3:00	Guangzhou, China	

== Professional boxing record ==
1 fight	1 win	0 losses
By knockout	1	0

No.	Result	Record	Opponent	Type	Round, time	Date	Location	Notes
1	Win	1–0	Franck Petitjean	KO	2 (6) 2:56	4 Oct 2025	Adidas Arena, Paris, France	

== See also ==
- List of current KSW fighters
