= Daniel Rutkowski =

Polish mixed martial artist (born 1989)

- Born: Daniel Rutkowski; 20 January 1989 (age 37); Radom, Poland
- Other names: Rutek
- Height: 5 ft 7 in (1.70 m)
- Weight: 146 lb (66 kg; 10 st 6 lb)
- Division: Welterweight (2016–present); Lightweight (2015, 2017, 2020)
- Reach: 67.7 in (172 cm)
- Style: Greco-Roman wrestling
- Fighting out of: Radom, Poland
- Team: Cross Fight Radom
- Years active: 2015–present

Professional boxing record
- Total: 4
- Wins: 2
- By knockout: 0
- Losses: 2

Mixed martial arts record
- Total: 24
- Wins: 19
- By knockout: 7
- By submission: 1
- By decision: 11
- By disqualification: 0
- Losses: 4
- By knockout: 0
- By submission: 1
- By decision: 3
- No contests: 1

Other information
- Boxing record from BoxRec
- Mixed martial arts record from Sherdog

Daniel Rutkowski (born 20 January 1989) is a Polish professional mixed martial artist and former boxer and bare-knuckle boxer. He currently competes under Konfrontacja Sztuk Walki (KSW). He is a former FEN and Babilon MMA Featherweight Champion. He has also previously competed on BAMMA. He represented Poland at the 2015 European Games in Wrestling.

== Background ==
Rutkowski competed at the 2015 European Games in Men's Greco-Roman Wrestling 71 kg. He lost 8-0 in the first round to Mykola Savchenko.

== Professional career ==
=== Early career ===
Rutkowski made his professional debut on June 19, 2015, against Radosław Tarnawa. Rutkowski lost the fight via a Majority Decision.

His next fight came on November 7, 2015, against Dawid Gajda. Rutkowski lost the fight via a Unanimous Decision.

Following a thirteen month absence, he returned to the cage on December 4, 2016, against Dylan Logan in his first fight outside of Poland. Rutkowski won the fight via a second-round TKO.

=== BAMMA ===
Rutkowski made his debut under BAMMA on February 24, 2017, against Niall Smith. Rutkowski won the fight via a third-round TKO.

His final fight with the federation came on May 12, 2017, against Cameron Hardy. Rutkowski won the fight via a second-round TKO.

=== OTP Lightweight Championship bout ===
Rutkowski faced Stevie McIntosh for the vacant OTP Lightweight Championship on September 30, 2017. The bout ended in a no contest after an accidental low blow rendered McIntosh unable to continue, ending with neither fighter winning the championship.

=== Thunderstrike Fight League ===
Rutkowski made his debut under Thunderstrike Fight League on November 18, 2017, against Patryk Duński. Rutkowski won the fight via a second-round submission.

=== Babilon MMA ===
Rutkowski made his debut under Babilon MMA on March 16, 2018, against Mateusz Siński. Rutkowski won the fight via a second-round TKO. This performance earned him his first career Knockout of the Night bonuses.

His next fight came on June 8, 2018, against Aleksander Georgas. Rutkowski won the fight via a first-round TKO.

His next fight came on January 25, 2019, against Łukasz Rajewski. Rutkowski won the fight via a Unanimous Decision.

=== Babilon MMA and FEN Featherweight Champion ===
Rutkowski faced Damian Zorczykowski for the inaugural Babilon MMA Featherweight Championshipon May 31, 2019. Rutkowski won the fight via a third-round TKO, winning his first career championship.

On October 26, 2019, he faced then FEN Featherweight Champion Adrian Zieliński for both the Babilon MMA and FEN championships. Rutkowski won the fight via a Unanimous Decision, becoming the first two-promotion champion in Poland.

His next fight came on December 13, 2019 in a non-title fight against Estabili Amato. Rutkowski won the fight via a Unanimous Decision.

Following a nine-month hiatus, he returned to the cage on September 25, 2020, against Rene Runge in a non-title fight. Rutkowski won the fight via a Unanimous Decision.

=== Fight Exclusive Night ===
Rutkowski made his debut under Fight Exclusive Night (FEN MMA) on November 28, 2020, in a rematch against Adrian Zieliński for both championships once again. However, Zieliński missed weight prior to the bout, which in turn made this a non-title fight. Rutkowski won the fight via a Unanimous Decision.

=== Konfrontacja Sztuk Walki ===
Rutkowski made his debut under Konfrontacja Sztuk Walki (KSW) on October 23, 2021, against Filip Pejić. Rutkowski won the fight via a second-round knockout. This performance earned him his second career Knockout of the Night bonus.

In his next fight, he faced Salahdine Parnasse on March 19, 2022, for his KSW Featherweight Championship. Rutkowski lost the fight via a fourth-round submission, failing to win the championship.

His next fight came on August 20, 2022, against Reginaldo Vieira. Rutkowski won the fight via a Unanimous Decision.

His next fight came on December 17, 2022, against Lom-Ali Eskiev. Rutkowski won the fight via a Split Decision.

His next fight came on June 3, 2023, against Adam Soldaev. Rutkowski won the fight via a Unanimous Decision.

His next fight came on November 11, 2023, against Patryk Kaczmarczyk. Rutkowski lost the fight via a Unanimous Decision. Despite the loss, this performance earned him his first career Fight of the Night bonus.

His next fight came on March 16, 2024, against Julio Cesar Neves. Rutkowski won the fight via a Unanimous Decision.

Following an over two-year long hiatus, he returned to the cage on April 18, 2026, against Oleksii Polishchuk. Rutkowski won the fight via a Unanimous Decision.

His next fight came two months later on June 20, against Daniel Tărchilă. Rutkowski won the fight via a Unanimous Decision.

== Boxing career ==
=== Professional ===
Rutkowski made his professional boxing debut on February 26, 2021, against Yaniel Evander Rivera. Rutkowski lost the fight via a Unanimous Decision.

His next fight came on April 9, 2021, against Dawid Śmiełowski. Rutkowski won the fight via a Unanimous Decision.

His next fight came on May 14, 2021, against Maksim Hardzeika. Rutkowski lost the fight via a Majority Decision.

His final fight came on December 17, 2021, against Damian Kiwior. Rutkowski won the fight via a Technical Decision in the sixth round after a cut from repeated headbutts.

=== Exhibition ===
His first exhibitiob bout came on July 17, 2020, against Przemysław Runowski. Rutkowski lost the fight via a Unanimous Decision.

His next fight came on October 1, 2022, against Piotr Pająk. Rutkowski won the fight via a Unanimous Decision.

His next fight came on May 10, 2024, against former Ultimate Fighting Championship (UFC) fighter Salim Touahri. Rutkowski won the fight via a Unanimous Decision.

=== Bare knuckle ===
Rutkowski made his bare knuckle boxing debut on February 27, 2026, against Issa Bens. Rutkowski won the fight via a disqualification in the fifth round after an illegal eye poke.

== Personal life ==
=== 2024 arrest ===
On August 23, 2024, Rutkowski was arrested in his home by plainclothes officers on suspicion of an armed robbery. The supposed armed robbery took place on August 12 in the parking lot of a store in Zabrze. By court order, him and other arrested men were placed into jail for three months awaiting trial. According to the court's assessment, the men were facing up to 20 years in prison. The men allegedly forced the victim to transfer around 1 million PLN to a designated account with a knife and an object that resembled a firearm. On August 27, 2025, an indictment was filed by the District Court in Gliwice against Rutkowski and the others for his involvement in the robbery. On December 17, 2025, he was officially released after fifteen months of pre-trial detention.

== Championships and accomplishments ==
=== Mixed martial arts ===
- Babilon MMA
  - Babilon MMA Featherweight Championship (One time; former)
    - One successful title defenses
  - Knockout of the Night (One time)
- Fight Exclusive Night
  - FEN Featherweight Championship (One time; former)
- Konfrontacja Sztuk Walki
  - Fight of the Night (One time)
  - Knockout of the Night (One time)

== Mixed martial arts record ==
Professional record breakdown
24 matches	19 wins	4 losses
By knockout	7	0
By submission	1	1
By decision	11	3
No contests	1	

Res.	Record	Opponent	Method	Event	Date	Round	Time	Location	Notes
Win	19–4 (1)	Daniel Tărchilă	Decision (unanimous)	KSW 119	June 20, 2026	3	5:00	Radom, Poland	Catchweight (150 lb) bout.
Win	18–4 (1)	Oleksii Polishchuk	Decision (unanimous)	KSW 117	April 18, 2026	3	5:00	Warsaw, Poland	
Win	17–4 (1)	Julio Cesar Neves	Decision (unanimous)	KSW 92	March 16, 2024	3	5:00	Gorzów Wielkopolski, Poland	
Loss	16–4 (1)	Patryk Kaczmarczyk	Decision (unanimous)	KSW 88	November 11, 2023	3	5:00	Radom, Poland	Fight of the Night.
Win	16–3 (1)	Adam Soldaev	Decision (unanimous)	KSW 83	June 3, 2023	3	5:00	Warsaw, Poland	
Win	15–3 (1)	Lom-Ali Eskiev	Decision (split)	KSW 77	December 17, 2022	3	5:00	Gliwice, Poland	
Win	14–3 (1)	Reginaldo Vieira	Decision (unanimous)	KSW 73	August 20, 2022	3	5:00	Warsaw, Poland	
Loss	13–3 (1)	Salahdine Parnasse	Submission (rear-naked choke)	KSW 68	March 19, 2022	4	1:07	Radom, Poland	For the KSW Featherweight Championship.
Win	13–2 (1)	Filip Pejić	KO (head kick)	KSW 64	October 23, 2021	1	1:22	Łódź, Poland	Knockout of the Night.
Win	12–2 (1)	Adrian Zieliński	Decision (unanimous)	Fight Exclusive Night 31	November 28, 2020	5	5:00	Łódź, Poland	Non-title bout; Zieliński missed weight (148.2 lb).
Win	11–2 (1)	Rene Runge	Decision (unanimous)	Babilon MMA 16	September 25, 2020	3	5:00	Legionowo, Poland	Lightweight bout.
Win	10–2 (1)	Estabili Amato	Decision (unanimous)	Babilon MMA 11	December 13, 2019	3	5:00	Radom, Poland	Catchweight (150 lb) bout.
Win	9–2 (1)	Adrian Zieliński	Decision (unanimous)	Babilon MMA 10	October 26, 2019	5	5:00	Wieliczka, Poland	Defended the Babilon MMA Featherweight Championship. Won the FEN Featherweight Championship.
Win	8–2 (1)	Damian Zorczykowski	TKO (punches)	Babilon MMA 8	May 31, 2019	3	4:34	Pruszków, Poland	Won the inaugural Babilon MMA Featherweight Championship.
Win	7–2 (1)	Łukasz Rajewski	Decision (unanimous)	Babilon MMA 7	January 25, 2019	3	5:00	Żyrardów, Poland	
Win	6–2 (1)	Aleksander Georgas	TKO (punches)	Babilon MMA 4	June 8, 2018	1	3:55	Ełk, Poland	
Win	5–2 (1)	Mateusz Siński	TKO (elbows)	Babilon MMA 3	March 16, 2018	2	3:36	Radom, Poland	Knockout of the Night.
Win	4–2 (1)	Patryk Duński	Submission (guillotine choke)	Thunderstrike Fight League 12	November 18, 2017	2	N/A	Radom, Poland	
NC	3–2 (1)	Stevie McIntosh	NC (accidental low blow)	On Top: Toe 2 Toe	September 30, 2017	1	N/A	Linwood, Scotland	For the vacant OTP Lightweight Championship. Accidental low blow rendered McIntosh unable to continue.
Win	3–2	Cameron Hardy	TKO (punches)	BAMMA 29	May 12, 2017	2	2:13	Birmingham, England	
Win	2–2	Niall Smith	TKO (punches)	BAMMA 28	February 24, 2017	3	2:16	Belfast, Northern Ireland	
Win	1–2	Dylan Logan	TKO (punches)	Clan Wars 26	December 4, 2016	2	0:45	Belfast, Northern Ireland	Featherweight debut.
Loss	0–2	Dawid Gajda	Decision (unanimous)	Thunderstorm 1	November 7, 2015	3	5:00	Łódź, Poland	
Loss	0–1	Radosław Tarnawa	Decision (majority)	PLMMA 56	June 19, 2015	3	5:00	Bielsko-Biała, Poland	Lightweight debut.

== Professional boxing record ==
4 fights	2 wins	2 losses
By decision	2	2

No.	Result	Record	Opponent	Type	Round, time	Date	Location	Notes
4	Win	2–2	Damian Kiwior	TD	6 (8), 0:35	17 Dec 2021	Hala MOSiR, Radom, Poland	
3	Loss	1–2	Maksim Hardzeika	MD	8	14 May 2021	Studio Transcolor, Szeligi, Poland	
2	Win	1–1	Dawid Śmiełowski	UD	6	9 Apr 2021	Klub Explosion, Warsaw, Poland	
1	Loss	0–1	Yaniel Evander Rivera	UD	6	26 Feb 2021	Klub Explosion, Warsaw, Poland	

== Bare-knuckle boxing record ==
Professional record breakdown
1 match	1 win	0 losses
By knockout	0	0
By decision	0	0
By disqualification	1	0
Unknown	0	0

Res.	Record	Opponent	Method	Event	Date	Round	Time	Location	Notes
Win	1–0	Issa Bens	DQ (illegal eye poke)	Gromda 24	February 27, 2026	5	15:50	Pionki, Poland	

== Exhibition boxing record ==
3 fights	2 wins	1 loss
By decision	2	1

No.	Result	Record	Opponent	Type	Round, time	Date	Location	Notes
3	Win	2–1	Salim Touahri	UD	4	10 May 2024	Hala Suche Stawy, Kraków, Poland	
2	Win	1–1	Piotr Pająk	UD	4	1 Oct 2022	Radomskie Centrum Sportu, Radom, Poland	
1	Loss	0–1	Przemysław Runowski	UD	6	18 Jul 2020	Goliat Security Building, Radom, Poland	

== See also ==
- List of current Konfrontacja Sztuk Walki fighters
- List of male mixed martial artists
