= Patryk Kaczmarczyk =

Polish mixed martial artist (born 1998)

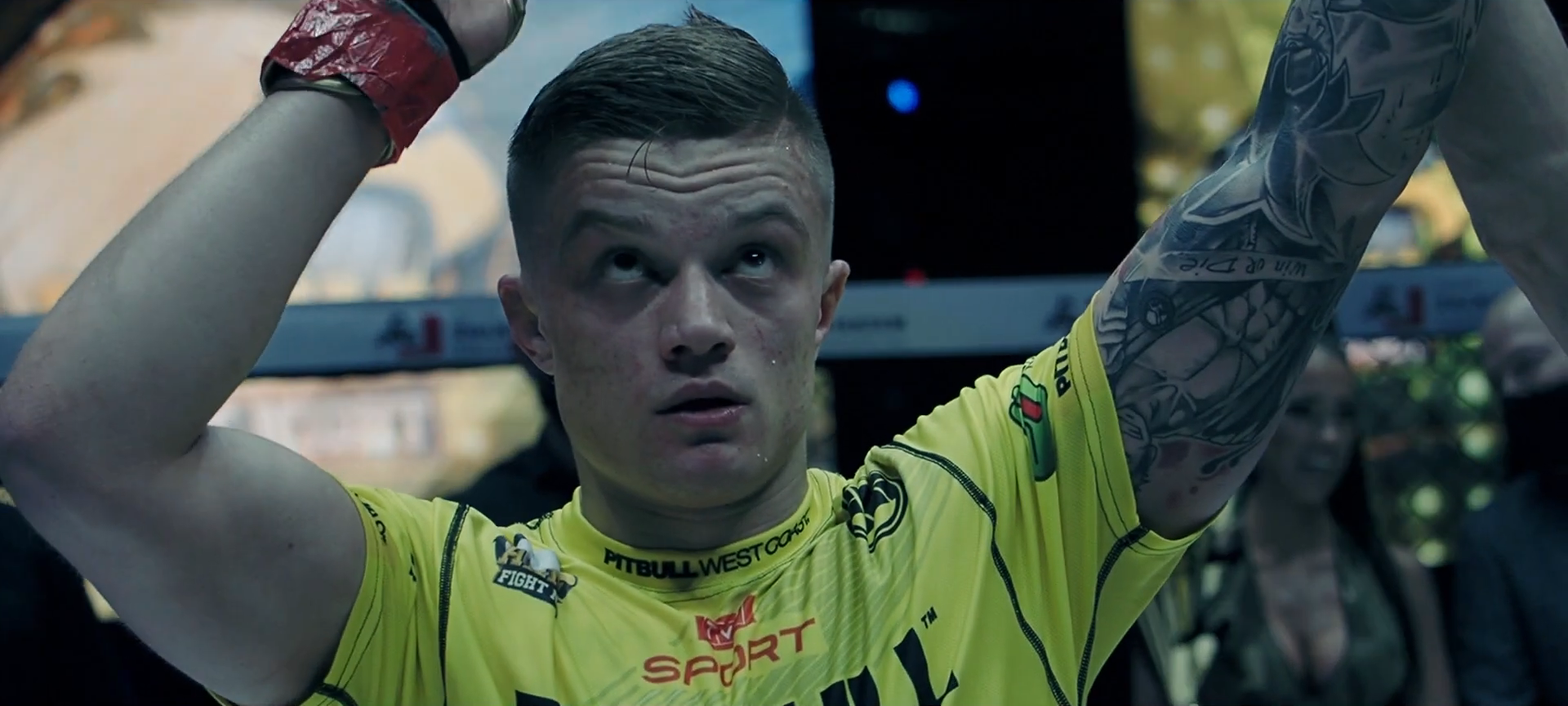
- Kaczmarczyk in 2021
- Born: Patryk Kaczmarczyk; June 23, 1998 (age 28); Radom, Poland
- Other names: Prince of Radom
- Height: 5 ft 8 in (1.73 m)
- Weight: 145 lb (66 kg; 10 st 5 lb)
- Division: Featherweight (2019–present)
- Reach: 71.3 in (181 cm)
- Style: Brazilian jiu-jitsu
- Fighting out of: Radom, Poland
- Team: Radomski Klub Taekwon-do
- Rank: Purple belt in Brazilian jiu-jitsu
- Years active: 2019–present

Mixed martial arts record
- Total: 17
- Wins: 14
- By knockout: 3
- By submission: 4
- By decision: 7
- Losses: 3
- By knockout: 2
- By decision: 1

Other information
- Mixed martial arts record from Sherdog

Patryk Kaczmarczyk (born June 23, 1998) is a Polish professional mixed martial artist. He is the current KSW Featherweight Champion. He is a former Armia Fight Night Featherweight Champion. He has previously competed on Babilon MMA.

== Professional career ==
=== Early career ===
Kaczmarczyk made his professional debut on June 14, 2019, against Daniel Matuszek. Kaczmarczyk won the fight via a Unanimous Decision.

His next fight came on December 28, 2019, against Karol Kutyła. Kaczmarczyk won the fight via a Unanimous Decision.

=== Babilon MMA ===
Kaczmarczyk made his debut under Babilon MMA on May 29, 2020, against Krystian Krawczyk. Kaczmarczyk won the fight via a Unanimous Decision.

His next fight came on June 26, 2020, against Hubert Sulewski. Kaczmarczyk won the fight via a first-round TKO.

=== Armia Fight Night ===
==== Armia Fight Night Featherweight Champion ====
Kacmarczyk faced Adrian Kępa for the vacant Armia Fight Night Featherweight Sabre on September 11, 2020. Kaczmarczyk won the fight via a third-round submission, winning his first career championship in the process.

His next fight came on January 22, 2021, against Edgar Davalos in a non-title catchweight bout. Kaczmarczyk won the fight via a third-round submission.

=== Konfrontacja Sztuk Walki ===
On March 5, 2021, it was announced that Kaczmarczyk had signed with Konfrontacja Sztuk Walki (KSW). In his debut, he faced another debutant, Michał Sobiech on April 24, 2021. Kaczmarczyk won the fight via a Unanimous Decision. This fight earned him his first career Fight of the Night bonus.

His next fight came on October 23, 2021, against Robert Ruchała. Kaczmarczyk lost the fight via a Unanimous Decision, suffering his first career loss after going seven fights unbeaten.

His next fight came on March 19, 2022, against Michał Domin. Kaczmarczyk won the fight via a second-round TKO.

His next fight came on July 23, 2022, against Dawid Śmiełowski. Kaczmarczyk lost the fight via a second-round knockout.

His next fight came on December 17, 2022, against Pascal Hintzen. Kaczmarczyk won the fight via a first-round knockout. This fight earned him his first Knockout of the Night bonus.

His next fight came on August 19, 2023, against Daniel Tărchilă. Kaczmarczyk won the fight via a Unanimous Decision.

His next fight came on November 11, 2023, against Daniel Rutkowski. Kaczmarczyk won the fight via a Unanimous Decision. This fight earned him his second career Fight of the Night bonus.

His next fight came on May 11, 2024, in a rematch against Robert Ruchała for the interim KSW Featherweight Championship. Kaczmarczyk lost the fight via a first-round knockout.

His next fight came on January 25, 2025, against Ahmed Vila. Kaczmarczyk won the fight via a Unanimous Decision.

Kaczmarczyk was scheduled to faced Leo Brichta on July 19, 2025. Kaczmarczyk later withdrew due to a leg injury, and was replaced with Adam Soldaev.

==== KSW Featherweight Champion ====
Following Soldaev's victory over Leo Brichta, he called out Kaczmarczyk in the post-fight interview, and the two faced off in the middle of the cage, to which both verbally agreed to fight. The fight was officially confirmed on September 18, 2025, with the fight being booked for November 15, 2025, for the interim KSW Featherweight Championship. Kaczmarczyk won the fight via a fifth-round submission, winning his second career championship in the process. This fight earned him two bonuses, his third Fight of the Night Bonus, and first Submission of the Night bonus. Following the departure of champion Salahdine Parnasse, Kaczmarczyk, the former interim champion, became the full featherweight champion.

His first title defense came on June 20, 2026, against Leo Brichta. Kaczmarczyk won the fight via a third-round submission, successfully defending his title.

== Championships and accomplishments ==
=== Mixed martial arts ===
- Konfrontacja Sztuk Walki
  - KSW Featherweight Championship (One time; current)
    - One successful title defense
  - Fight of the Night (Three times)
  - Knockout of the Night (One time)
  - Submission of the Night (One time)
- Armia Fight Night
  - Armia Fight Night Featherweight Sabre (One time; former)

== Mixed martial arts record ==
Professional record breakdown
| 17 matches | 14 wins | 3 losses |
| By knockout | 3 | 2 |
| By submission | 4 | 0 |
| By decision | 7 | 1 |

| Res. | Record | Opponent | Method | Event | Date | Round | Time | Location | Notes |
|---|---|---|---|---|---|---|---|---|---|
| Win | 14–3 | Leo Brichta | Submission (arm-triangle choke) | KSW 119 | June 20, 2026 | 3 | 4:22 | Radom, Poland | Defended the KSW Featherweight Championship. |
| Win | 13–3 | Adam Soldaev | Submission (rear-naked choke) | KSW 112 | November 15, 2025 | 5 | 3:17 | Szczecin, Poland | Won the interim KSW Featherweight Championship. Submission of the Night. Fight of the Night. Kaczmarczyk was promoted to undisputed champion on April 6, 2026. |
| Win | 12–3 | Ahmed Vila | Decision (unanimous) | KSW 102 | January 25, 2025 | 3 | 5:00 | Radom, Poland | |
| Loss | 11–3 | Robert Ruchała | KO (front kick to the body) | KSW 94 | May 11, 2024 | 1 | 0:59 | Gdańsk, Poland | For the interim KSW Featherweight Championship. |
| Win | 11–2 | Daniel Rutkowski | Decision (unanimous) | KSW 88 | November 11, 2023 | 3 | 5:00 | Radom, Poland | Fight of the Night. |
| Win | 10–2 | Daniel Tărchilă | Decision (unanimous) | KSW 85 | August 19, 2023 | 3 | 5:00 | Nowy Sącz, Poland | |
| Win | 9–2 | Pascal Hintzen | KO (knees) | KSW 77 | December 17, 2022 | 1 | 1:03 | Gliwice, Poland | Knockout of the Night. |
| Loss | 8–2 | Dawid Śmiełowski | KO (body kick) | KSW 72 | July 23, 2022 | 2 | 1:51 | Kielce, Poland | |
| Win | 8–1 | Michał Domin | TKO (punches) | KSW 68 | March 19, 2022 | 2 | 2:15 | Radom, Poland | |
| Loss | 7–1 | Robert Ruchała | Decision (unanimous) | KSW 64 | October 23, 2021 | 3 | 5:00 | Łódź, Poland | |
| Win | 7–0 | Michał Sobiech | Decision (unanimous) | KSW 60 | April 24, 2021 | 3 | 5:00 | Łódź, Poland | Fight of the Night. |
| Win | 6–0 | Edgar Davalos | Submission (arm-triangle choke) | Armia Fight Night 9 | January 22, 2021 | 3 | 4:53 | Mińsk Mazowiecki, Poland | Catchweight (147 lb) bout. |
| Win | 5–0 | Adrian Kępa | Technical Submission (rear-naked choke) | Armia Fight Night 8 | September 11, 2020 | 3 | 3:25 | Gliwice, Poland | Won the vacant Armia Fight Night Featherweight Championship. |
| Win | 4–0 | Hubert Sulewski | TKO (knee to the body and punches) | Babilon MMA 14 | June 26, 2020 | 1 | 2:35 | Radom, Poland | Catchweight (148 lb) bout. |
| Win | 3–0 | Krystian Krawczyk | Decision (unanimous) | Babilon MMA 13 | May 29, 2020 | 3 | 5:00 | Radom, Poland | Catchweight (150 lb) bout. |
| Win | 2–0 | Karol Kutyła | Decision (unanimous) | Madness Cage Fighting 5 | December 28, 2019 | 3 | 5:00 | Puławy, Poland | |
| Win | 1–0 | Daniel Matuszek | Decision (unanimous) | Armia Fight Night 6 | June 14, 2019 | 3 | 5:00 | Radom, Poland | Featherweight debut. |

== See also ==
- List of male mixed martial artists
