= Adrian Bartosiński =

Polish mixed martial artist (born 1995)

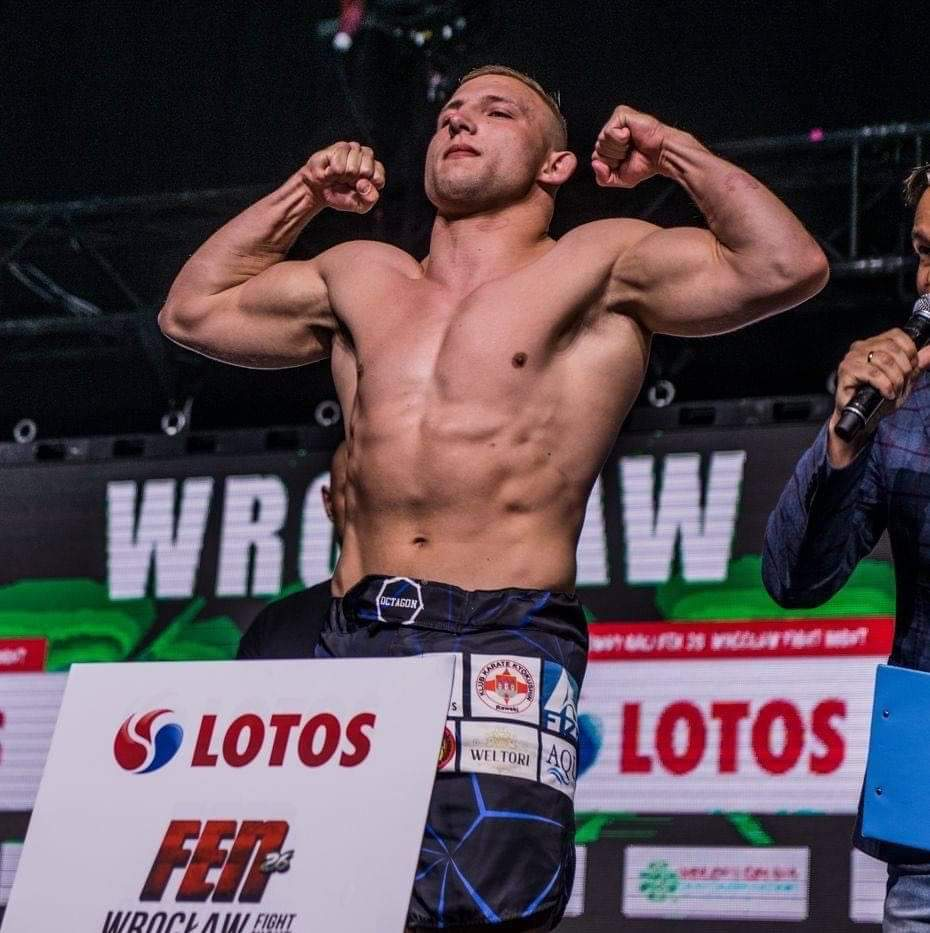
- Born: August 26, 1995 (age 31); Rawa Mazowiecka, Poland
- Other names: Bartos
- Height: 5 ft 11 in (1.80 m)
- Weight: 170 lb (77 kg; 12 st 2 lb)
- Division: Welterweight (2021–present); Middleweight (2017–2020, 2024)
- Reach: 71 in (180 cm)
- Style: Mixed Martial Arts
- Stance: Orthodox
- Fighting out of: Rawa Mazowiecka, Poland
- Team: Oktopus Łódź; American Top Team
- Trainer: Dawid Pepłowski
- Years active: 2017–present

Mixed martial arts record
- Total: 19
- Wins: 18
- By knockout: 12
- By submission: 2
- By decision: 4
- Losses: 1
- By submission: 1

Other information
- Mixed martial arts record from Sherdog

Adrian Bartosiński (born August 25, 1995) is a Polish professional mixed martial artist. He currently competes in the Welterweight division for Konfrontacja Sztuk Walki. He is the current KSW Welterweight Champion.

== Professional career ==
=== Early career ===
Before his professional career, he fought as an amateur. In his last bout, he defeated Michał Pach by a split decision at the TFL 12: Hydro Truck Night event.

His first professional fight came four months later, against Wojciech Żuchnik. Bartosiński won again by unanimous decision.

After a half-year hiatus, he would return in a bout against Jarosław Lech. Bartosiński would win via TKO in the second round.

He would return seven months later against Ukraine's Vladislav Schepanskyi. He would defeat the latter via a Doctor Stoppage in the first round.

Three months later, he would return in a bout against Russia's Alexander Shingarenko. Bartosiński would win via a first-round TKO.

=== Fight Exclusive Night ===
Three months later, Bartosiński would fight under Poland's second biggest promotion, Fight Exclusive Night. He fought Krystian Bielski. Bartosiński would win via TKO, and also earn himself a Knockout of the Night bonus.

=== Return to regional circuit ===
Two months later, he would return to take on Ukraine's Konstantin Linnik in his home town of Rawa Mazowiecka. Bartosiński would win via a first-round TKO.

=== Konfrontacja Sztuk Walki ===
==== Tylko Jeden ====
Adrian would compete in the Tylko Jeden tournament. He would compete for a contract with Konfrontacja Sztuk Walki. In the first round, he faced Kamil Dołgowski, whom he would beat via a Doctor Stoppage in the first round.

His next fight in the tournament would be against Piotr Walawski. Bartosiński would win via a third-round TKO, and thus advancing to the finals.

Bartosiński was set to face Tomasz Romanowski in the final, however he would suffer an injury, and was forced to withdraw from the tournament.

==== Main Roster ====
Despite not winning the tournament, Bartosiński would still eventually sign with the promotion. His first fight came almost a year later, when he took on Spain's Lionel Padilla. Bartosiński would win via a third-round TKO.

His next fight would come four months later, where he took on fellow countryman, Michał Michalski. He would beat Michalski via a first-round TKO.

After over half a year out, he would return against Andrzej Grzebyk. Bartosiński would win via submission for the first time in his career. This performance would earn him a Submission of the Night bonus.

After a nine-month hiatus, he would return to the cage against Krystian Kaszubowski. Bartosiński would win via a first-round TKO.

==== KSW Welterweight Champion ====
Five months later, he would face Artur Szczepaniak for the vacant KSW Welterweight Championship. Bartosiński would win the fight via a first-round TKO, and thus claiming his first career championship. In the process, he also received a Knockout of the Night bonus.

His first title defense would come eight months later, when he took on France's Salahdine Parnasse. Parnasse was also the current Featherweight and Lightweight champion. Bartosiński would win the fight via Unanimous Decision.

His next title defense came five months later. Bartosiński was originally scheduled to face Andrzej Grzebyk in a rematch, however Grzebyk pulled out due to injury. He would end up facing Igor Michaliszyn, whom he would beat via submission in the third round.

His next fight was not a title fight. He would face veteran fighter Mamed Khalidov half a year later. Khalidov would win via submission in the second round, and in the process handing Bartosiński his first career loss.

Five months later, he would face Andrzej Grzebyk in a rematch. This time the fight being for the title. Bartosiński would win via a Unanimous Decision in what is claimed by many to be the greatest fight in the organization. Bartosiński would also earn himself a Fight of the Night bonus.

Following an eight month hiatus after sustaining an injury in his last fight, his fourth title defense came on December 20, 2025, against Muslim Tulshaev. Bartosiński won the fight via a third-round TKO. This fight earned him his second Fight of the Night bonus.

His next title defense came on March 14, 2026, against Madars Fleminas. Bartosiński won the fight via a controversial Split Decision, defending his title successfully for the fifth time.

== Championships and accomplishments ==
- Konfrontacja Sztuk Walki
  - KSW Welterweight Championship (One time; current)
    - Five successful title defenses
  - Fight of the Night (Two times) vs. Andrzej Grzebyk, and Muslim Tulshaev
  - Knockout of the Night (One time) vs. Artur Szczepaniak
  - Submission of the Night (One time) vs. Andrzej Grzebyk
- Fight Exclusive Night
  - Knockout of the Night (One time) vs. Krystian Bielski

== Mixed martial arts record ==
Professional record breakdown
19 matches	18 wins	1 loss
By knockout	12	0
By submission	2	1
By decision	4	0

Res.	Record	Opponent	Method	Event	Date	Round	Time	Location	Notes
Win	18–1	Madars Fleminas	Decision (split)	KSW 116	March 14, 2026	5	5:00	Gorzów Wielkopolski, Poland	Defended the KSW Welterweight Championship.
Win	17–1	Muslim Tulshaev	TKO (elbows)	KSW 113	December 20, 2025	3	4:56	Łódź, Poland	Defended the KSW Welterweight Championship. Fight of the Night.
Win	16–1	Andrzej Grzebyk	Decision (unanimous)	KSW 105	April 26, 2025	5	5:00	Gliwice, Poland	Defended the KSW Welterweight Championship. Fight of the Night.
Loss	15–1	Mamed Khalidov	Submission (armbar)	KSW 100	November 16, 2024	2	2:48	Gliwice, Poland	Middleweight bout.
Win	15–0	Igor Michaliszyn	Submission (kneebar)	KSW 94	May 11, 2024	3	4:50	Gdańsk, Poland	Defended the KSW Welterweight Championship.
Win	14–0	Salahdine Parnasse	Decision (unanimous)	KSW 89	December 16, 2023	5	5:00	Gliwice, Poland	Defended the KSW Welterweight Championship.
Win	13–0	Artur Szczepaniak	TKO (punches)	KSW 81	April 22, 2023	1	1:47	Tomaszów Mazowiecki, Poland	Won the vacant KSW Welterweight Championship. Knockout of the Night
Win	12–0	Krystian Kaszubowski	TKO (elbows and punches)	KSW 76	November 12, 2022	1	4:58	Grodzisk Mazowiecki, Poland	
Win	11–0	Andrzej Grzebyk	Submission (kneebar)	KSW 67	February 26, 2022	2	0:33	Warsaw, Poland	Submission of the Night.
Win	10–0	Michał Michalski	TKO (punches)	KSW 62	July 17, 2021	1	1:53	Warsaw, Poland	
Win	9–0	Lionel Padilla	TKO (punches)	KSW 59	March 20, 2021	3	4:05	Łódź, Poland	Welterweight debut.
Win	8–0	Piotr Walawski	TKO (punch)	KSW Tylko Jeden: Episode 6	April 17, 2020	3	0:23	Warsaw, Poland	KSW Tylko Jeden Tournament Semifinal.
Win	7–0	Kamil Dołgowski	TKO (doctor stoppage)	KSW Tylko Jeden: Episode 3	March 20, 2020	1	3:00	Warsaw, Poland	KSW Tylko Jeden Tournament Quarterfinal.
Win	6–0	Konstantin Linnik	TKO (elbows)	Wirtuoz Challenge: Rawa Mazowiecka Fight Night	December 6, 2019	1	1:05	Rawa Mazowiecka, Poland	Catchweight (176 lb) bout.
Win	5–0	Krystian Bielski	TKO (punches)	Fight Exclusive Night 26	October 12, 2019	2	2:15	Wrocław, Poland	Catchweight (182 lb) bout. Knockout of the Night.
Win	4–0	Alexander Shingarenko	TKO (punches)	Rocky Warriors Cartel 3	July 5, 2019	1	2:41	Gdynia, Poland	
Win	3–0	Vladislav Schepanskyi	TKO (doctor stoppage)	Wirtuoz Challenge 2	April 6, 2019	1	2:30	Wolbórz, Poland	
Win	2–0	Jarosław Lech	TKO (punches)	Wirtuoz Challenge 1	September 22, 2018	2	3:10	Wolbórz, Poland	
Win	1–0	Wojciech Żuchnik	Decision (unanimous)	Thunderstrike Fight League 13	March 23, 2018	3	5:00	Lublin, Poland	Middleweight debut.
