= 2024 Polish Basketball Supercup =

2024 Pekao S.A. Superpuchar Polski
Tournament details
- Arena: Sports Hall RCS; Radom, Poland
- Dates: 28–29 September 2024

Awards and statistics
- MVP: (United States) Reggie Lynch

The 2024 Polish Basketball Supercup (Polish: Superpuchar Polski 2024), also known as Pekao S.A. Superpuchar 2024 for sponsorship reasons, is the 19th edition of the super cup tournament, organized the Polish Basketball League (PLK). For the first time, Radom will host the Supercup.

It is the first edition of a new format Supercup with four teams participating, instead of just two as it was previously. Tournament will be played between not only the champions and the Polish Cup winners but also the other two medalists of the Polish league from the recently concluded season.

== Participant teams ==
Team	Home city	Head coach	Status
Trefl Sopot	Sopot	(Croatia) Žan Tabak	PLK champion
Legia Warsaw	Warsaw	(Croatia) Ivica Skelin	Polish Cup champion
King Szczecin	Szczecin	(Poland) Arkadiusz Miłoszewski	PLK silver medalist
Śląsk Wrocław	Wrocław	(Serbia) Miodrag Rajković	PLK bronze medalist

== Final Four ==
Semifinals; 28 September
Trefl Sopot	76
King Szczecin	83
Legia Warsaw	70
Śląsk Wrocław	77

Final; 29 September
King Szczecin	75
Śląsk Wrocław	76
