= Robert Ruchała =

Polish mixed martial artist (born 1998)

- Born: May 15, 1998 (age 28); Nowy Sącz, Poland
- Other names: Faker
- Height: 5 ft 10 in (1.78 m)
- Weight: 145 lb (66 kg; 10 st 5 lb)
- Division: Featherweight (2019–present)
- Reach: 72 in (183 cm)
- Style: Kickboxing, Brazilian Jiu-jitsu
- Stance: Orthodox
- Fighting out of: Nowy Sącz, Poland
- Team: Grappling Fight Kraków; Fight House Nowy Sącz; American Top Team
- Years active: 2019–present

Mixed martial arts record
- Total: 14
- Wins: 11
- By knockout: 3
- By submission: 3
- By decision: 5
- Losses: 3
- By knockout: 1
- By decision: 2

Other information
- Mixed martial arts record from Sherdog

Robert Ruchała (born May 15, 1998) is a Polish professional mixed martial artist. He currently competes in the Featherweight division for the UFC.

== Mixed martial arts career ==
=== Amateur ===
In the amateurs, Ruchała racked up a solid 15–2 record. In 2018, he would get second place during the ALMMA 163 Polish Championships in Sochaczew.

=== Professional ===
==== Early career ====
Ruchała would make his professional debut on November 9, 2019, where he would face off against Mariusz Szyja. Ruchała would go on to win that fight via a unanimous decision. He would go on to have two more fights before signing with Konfrontacja Sztuk Walki

==== Konfrontacja Sztuk Walki ====
On November 14, 2020, Ruchała would make his debut for the promotion in a bout against Michał Domin on November 14, 2020, on the undercard of KSW 56. Ruchała would end up winning by submission in the first round just before the end. This performance would score him a Performance of the Night bonus.

His next fight would come 2 months later, where he faced off against Daniel Bažant, whom he would beat by yet another submission and scoring himself his second Performance of the Night bonus in his second bout in the promotion.

After two more fights, he would face off against Damian Stasiak on October 14, 2022. Ruchała would win the fight via a split decision improving his record to 7–0 and also scoring his third bonus and his first Fight of the Night.

His next fight was for the KSW Interim Featherweight Championship. He would face off against Lom-Ali Eskiev. Ruchała would win the fight via TKO in the fifth round and thus securing the title and receiving another Fight of the Night bonus.

3 months later, Ruchała would face lineal champion Salahdine Parnasse to unify the two titles. The bout took place in his home city of Nowy Sącz. Ruchała would unfortunately lose this fight via TKO, and ultimately lost the interim title, and his undefeated record.

Ruchała would return to the cage on May 11, 2024, against Patryk Kaczmarczyk. The fight was once again for the KSW Interim Featherweight Championship. He would win the fight via KO in the first minute of the first round, and thus winning the interim title for the second time in his career and scoring his first Knockout of the Night bonus.

6 months later, he would defend his interim title on the 100th KSW event against Kacper Formela. He would defend his title via TKO in the third round. After the fight, Ruchała proposed to his girlfriend in the center of the cage, to which she said yes.

On March 20, 2025, it was confirmed that Ruchała would be leaving the promotion in favor of joining the UFC.

==== Ultimate Fighting Championship ====
On June 19, 2025, Ruchała announced on his Instagram that he officially signed his contract with the UFC, alongside a fellow former KSW Champion, Jakub Wikłacz.

Ruchała faced William Gomis on September 6, 2025 at UFC Fight Night 258. He lost the fight by unanimous decision.

Ruchała faced José Mauro Delano on April 4, 2026 at UFC Fight Night 272. After being deducted one point due to grabbing the fence, he lost the fight via unanimous decision.

== Championships and accomplishments ==
=== Mixed martial arts ===
- Konfrontacja Sztuk Walki
  - KSW Interim Featherweight Championship (Two times; former)
    - One successful title defense
  - Fight of the Night (Two times)
  - Submission of the Night (Two times)
  - Knockout of the Night (One time)

== Mixed martial arts record ==
Professional record breakdown
14 matches	11 wins	3 losses
By knockout	3	1
By submission	3	0
By decision	5	2

Res.	Record	Opponent	Method	Event	Date	Round	Time	Location	Notes
Loss	11–3	José Mauro Delano	Decision (unanimous)	UFC Fight Night: Moicano vs. Duncan	April 4, 2026	3	5:00	Las Vegas, Nevada, United States	Ruchała was deducted one point in round 3 due to grabbing the fence.
Loss	11–2	William Gomis	Decision (unanimous)	UFC Fight Night: Imavov vs. Borralho	September 6, 2025	3	5:00	Paris, France	
Win	11–1	Kacper Formela	TKO (elbows and punches)	KSW 100	November 16, 2024	3	2:44	Gliwice, Poland	Defended the interim KSW Featherweight Championship.
Win	10–1	Patryk Kaczmarczyk	KO (front kick to the body)	KSW 94	May 11, 2024	1	0:59	Gdańsk, Poland	Won the interim KSW Featherweight Championship. Knockout of the Night.
Loss	9–1	Salahdine Parnasse	KO (soccer kick to the body)	KSW 85	August 19, 2023	2	4:14	Nowy Sącz, Poland	For the KSW Featherweight Championship.
Win	9–0	Lom-Ali Eskiev	TKO (punches and elbows)	KSW 80	March 17, 2023	5	4:35	Lubin, Poland	Won the interim KSW Featherweight Championship. Fight of the Night
Win	8–0	Damian Stasiak	Decision (split)	KSW 75	October 14, 2022	3	5:00	Nowy Sącz, Poland	Fight of the Night
Win	7–0	Michele Baiano	Decision (unanimous)	KSW 69	April 23, 2022	3	5:00	Warsaw, Poland	Catchweight (150 lb) bout.
Win	6–0	Patryk Kaczmarczyk	Decision (unanimous)	KSW 64	October 23, 2021	3	5:00	Łódź, Poland	
Win	5–0	Daniel Bažant	Submission (armbar)	KSW 58	January 30, 2021	3	3:37	Łódź, Poland	Catchweight (150 lb) bout. Submission of the Night
Win	4–0	Michał Domin	Submission (armbar)	KSW 56	November 14, 2020	1	4:59	Łódź, Poland	Submission of the Night
Win	3–0	Paweł Szumlas	Submission (rear-naked choke)	Wieczór Walk 6	July 25, 2020	2	3:37	Kraków, Poland	
Win	2–0	Dawid Kareta	Decision (unanimous)	Wieczór Walk 5	December 14, 2019	3	5:00	Kraków, Poland	
Win	1–0	Mariusz Szyja	Decision (unanimous)	Octagon No Mercy 8	November 9, 2019	3	5:00	Zawiercie, Poland	Featherweight debut.
