= Valeriu Mircea =

Moldovan mixed martial artist (born 1993)

- Born: October 5, 1993 (age 33); Chișinău, Moldova
- Other names: The Solitary Wolf
- Nationality: Moldovan, Italian
- Height: 5 ft 10 in (1.78 m)
- Weight: 154.5 lb (70 kg; 11 st 1 lb)
- Division: Featherweight (2014, 2016, 2019, 2021); Lightweight (2015–present); Welterweight (2015, 2016)
- Reach: 72.4 in (184 cm)
- Style: Brazilian jiu-jitsu, Wrestling and Judo
- Fighting out of: Rome, Italy
- Team: Mircea Fight Club Moldova
- Rank: Black belt in Brazilian jiu-jitsu and Judo
- Years active: 2014–present

Mixed martial arts record
- Total: 43
- Wins: 32
- By knockout: 13
- By submission: 13
- By decision: 6
- Losses: 10
- By knockout: 3
- By submission: 3
- By decision: 4
- Draws: 1

Other information
- Mixed martial arts record from Sherdog

Valeriu Mircea (born October 5, 1993) is a Moldovan professional mixed martial artist. He currently competes in the Lightweight division for Konfrontacja Sztuk Walki. He has previously competed on Brave Combat Federation, Eagle FC, Bellator, Real Xtreme Fighting, and M-1 Global.

== Professional career ==
=== Early career ===
Mircea made his professional debut on November 14, 2014, against Luca Puggioni. Mircea won the fight via a first-round Submission.

=== M-1 Global ===
After accumulating a record of 7–1, Mircea made his debut with Russian promotion M-1 Global on August 5, 2015, against Raul Tutarauli. Mircea lost the fight via a first-round TKO.

=== Bellator MMA ===
After accumulating a record of 18–3, Mircea made his debut with Bellator MMA on December 10, 2016, in the co-main event of Bellator 168 against Goiti Yamauchi. Mircea lost the fight via a first-round submission.

His next fight came on April 8, 2017, on the undercard of Bellator 176 against Djamil Chan. Mircea won the fight via Majority Decision.

=== Eagles FC Featherweight Champion ===
After accumulating a career record of 24–5–1, Mircea faced Andrey Barbarosa on February 16, 2019, for the vacant Eagles FC Featherweight championship. Mircea won the fight via a first-round KO, and thus won his second career championship.

In his next bout, he faced Martun Mezhlumyan for the vacant Eagles FC Lightweight championship on February 15, 2020. Mircea lost the fight via split decision.

=== Brave Combat Federation ===
Mircea made his debut with Brave Combat Federation on April 1, 2021, against Omar Solomanov on the undercard of Brave CF 50. Mircea lost the fight via Unanimous Decision.

His next fight came on August 1, 2021, against Ayub Gaziev on the undercard of Brave CF 52. Mircea won the fight via a first-round knockout.

=== Konfrontacja Sztuk Walki ===
Mircea made his debut with Polish promotion Konfrontacja Sztuk Walki on June 18, 2022, against Roman Szymański. Mircea lost the fight via a first-round TKO.

His next fight came on November 12, 2022, against Gracjan Szadziński. Mircea won the fight via a first-round TKO.

His next fight came on January 21, 2023, against Borys Mańkowski. Mircea won the fight via a first-round TKO. This performance earned him a Knockout of the Night bonus.

His next fight came on June 3, 2023, in a rematch against Roman Szymański. Mircea won the fight via Split Decision.

His next fight came on February 17, 2024, against Leo Brichta for the KSW Interim Lightweight championship. Mircea won the fight via a fourth-round submission, and thus claimed his third career championship. This performance earned him a Fight of the Night bonus.

His next fight came on April 6, 2024, against Salahdine Parnasse for the lineal KSW Lightweight championship. Mircea lost the fight via a first-round TKO.

After over a year out, Mircea was scheduled to face Roman Szymański on November 15, 2025 in a trilogy. Szymański later withdrew from the fight due to a knee injury, and was replaced by Wilson Varela. Mircea won the fight via a unanimous decision.

His next fight came on May 16, 2026, in a trilogy against Roman Szymański. Mircea won the fight via a second-round TKO. This performance earned him his second Knockout of the Night bonus.

== Championships and accomplishments ==
=== Mixed martial arts ===
- Konfrontacja Sztuk Walki
  - KSW Interim Lightweight championship (One time; former)
  - Knockout of the Night (Two times)
  - Fight of the Night (One time)
- Eagles FC
  - Eagles FC Featherweight championship (One time; former)
- Power Nation FC
  - Power Nation FC Lightweight championship (One time; former)
- World Freefight Challenge
  - Fight of the Night (One time)

== Mixed martial arts record ==
Professional record breakdown
| 43 matches | 32 wins | 10 losses |
| By knockout | 13 | 3 |
| By submission | 13 | 3 |
| By decision | 6 | 4 |
| Draws | 1 | |

| Res. | Record | Opponent | Method | Event | Date | Round | Time | Location | Notes |
|---|---|---|---|---|---|---|---|---|---|
| Loss | 32–10–1 | Marcin Held | Decision (unanimous) | KSW 123 | November 21, 2026 | 5 | 5:00 | Szczecin, Poland | For the vacant KSW Lightweight Championship. |
| Win | 32–9–1 | Roman Szymański | TKO (punches) | KSW 118 | May 16, 2026 | 2 | 0:52 | Kalisz, Poland | Knockout of the Night. |
| Win | 31–9–1 | Wilson Varela | Decision (unanimous) | KSW 112 | November 15, 2025 | 3 | 5:00 | Szczecin, Poland | Catchweight (160 lb) bout. |
| Loss | 30–9–1 | Salahdine Parnasse | KO (head kick and punches) | KSW 93 | April 6, 2024 | 1 | 4:00 | Paris, France | For the KSW Lightweight Championship. |
| Win | 30–8–1 | Leo Brichta | Submission (rear-naked choke) | KSW 91 | February 17, 2024 | 4 | 2:40 | Liberec, Czech Republic | Won the interim KSW Lightweight Championship. Fight of the Night. |
| Win | 29–8–1 | Roman Szymański | Decision (split) | KSW 83 | June 3, 2023 | 3 | 5:00 | Warsaw, Poland | |
| Win | 28–8–1 | Borys Mańkowski | KO (punches) | KSW 78 | January 21, 2023 | 1 | 4:22 | Szczecin, Poland | Knockout of the Night. |
| Win | 27–8–1 | Gracjan Szadziński | KO (punch) | KSW 76 | November 12, 2022 | 1 | 1:39 | Grodzisk Mazowiecki, Poland | |
| Loss | 26–8–1 | Roman Szymański | TKO (hand injury) | KSW 71 | June 18, 2022 | 1 | 5:00 | Toruń, Poland | |
| Win | 26–7–1 | Ayub Gaziev | KO (punch) | Brave CF 52 | August 1, 2021 | 1 | 0:43 | Milan, Italy | |
| Loss | 25–7–1 | Omar Solomonov | Decision (unanimous) | Brave CF 50 | April 1, 2021 | 3 | 5:00 | Arad, Bahrain | Featherweight bout. |
| Loss | 25–6–1 | Martun Mezhlumyan | Decision (split) | Eagles FC: Next Level | February 15, 2020 | 5 | 5:00 | Ciorescu, Moldova | Return to Lightweight. For the vacant Eagles FC Lightweight Championship. |
| Win | 25–5–1 | Andrey Barbarosa | KO (punch) | Eagles FC 11 | February 16, 2019 | 1 | 0:51 | Chișinău, Moldova | Return to Featherweight. Won the vacant Eagles FC Featherweight Championship. |
| Win | 24–5–1 | Flávio Pina | Decision (unanimous) | Eagles FC 10 | November 3, 2018 | 3 | 5:00 | Chișinău, Moldova | |
| Win | 23–5–1 | Anton Kuivanen | TKO (punches) | CAGE 44 | September 8, 2018 | 2 | 4:15 | Helsinki, Finland | |
| Win | 22–5–1 | Marco Manara | TKO (punches) | Trieste Fight Night 2018 | July 13, 2018 | 1 | 2:10 | Trieste, Italy | |
| Win | 21–5–1 | Nemat Abdrashitov | KO (elbow) | Eagles FC 9 | May 26, 2018 | 3 | 3:18 | Chișinău, Moldova | |
| Win | 20–5–1 | Teddy Violet | Submission (guilltoine choke) | Magnum FC 4 | March 3, 2018 | 2 | 2:00 | Verona, Italy | |
| Draw | 19–5–1 | Gregor Weibel | Draw (unanimous) | Venkon Fight Night 2 | January 21, 2018 | 3 | 5:00 | Milan, Italy | |
| Loss | 19–5 | Ibragim Kantaev | Decision (unanimous) | RXF 29 | December 18, 2017 | 3 | 5:00 | Brașov, Romania | |
| Win | 19–4 | Djamil Chan | Decision (majority) | Bellator 176 | April 8, 2017 | 3 | 5:00 | Turin, Italy | |
| Loss | 18–4 | Goiti Yamauchi | Submission (triangle choke) | Bellator 168 | December 10, 2016 | 1 | 3:33 | Florence, Italy | |
| Win | 18–3 | Hrvoje Stepić | KO (punch) | Power Nation FC: Fight Day Gala | November 5, 2016 | 1 | 3:55 | Pordenone, Italy | |
| Win | 17–3 | Leonardo Carletti | Submission (guillotine choke) | Fight or Nothing: Road to Bellator – The Final Countdown | October 29, 2016 | 1 | 2:30 | Florence, Italy | |
| Win | 16–3 | Piotr Niedzielski | Decision (unanimous) | World Freefight Challenge 20 | August 27, 2016 | 3 | 5:00 | Bad Vöslau, Austria | Fight of the Night. |
| Win | 15–3 | Vladimir Nedozhdykh | TKO (punches) | Gotti Fight Night: East Invasion 2 | July 23, 2016 | 1 | 4:21 | Trieste, Italy | |
| Win | 14–3 | Erik Fernandez | Submission (armbar) | Oktagon Kickboxing: Road to Bellator | July 10, 2016 | 3 | 3:02 | Italy | |
| Loss | 13–3 | Cody McKenzie | Submission (guillotine choke) | Venator FC 3 | May 21, 2016 | 2 | 1:30 | Milan, Italy | Welterweight bout. |
| Win | 13–2 | Christian Balsamo | TKO (punches) | Fight or Nothing: Road to Bellator | April 2, 2016 | 1 | 3:01 | Lugano, Switzerland | |
| Win | 12–2 | Roman Popov | Decision (unanimous) | Gotti Promotions: East Invasion | March 13, 2016 | 3 | 5:00 | Trieste, Italy | Featherweight bout. |
| Win | 11–2 | Maxim Radu | TKO (punches) | Oktagon: Thai Boxe Mania 8 | January 30, 2016 | 2 | 2:52 | Turin, Italy | |
| Win | 10–2 | Anderson da Silva Santos | Submission (rear-naked choke) | Power Nation FC 6 | December 20, 2015 | 1 | 3:57 | Pordenone, Italy | Won the vacant Power Nation FC Lightweight Championship. |
| Win | 9–2 | Arbi Kilaev | Submission (rear-naked choke) | Gotti Promotions: Russia Comes to Trieste | November 15, 2015 | 1 | 2:40 | Trieste, Italy | |
| Win | 8–2 | Aldo Cirillo | Submission (ankle lock) | Fight or Nothing: Clash of Titans | September 26, 2015 | 2 | 2:38 | Calenzano, Italy | Welterweight bout. |
| Loss | 7–2 | Raul Tutarauli | TKO (punches) | M-1 Challenge 60 | August 5, 2015 | 1 | 3:18 | Oryol, Russia | |
| Win | 7–1 | Marco Manara | TKO (punches) | Born to Fight: Milano in the Cage 5 | June 13, 2015 | 3 | 1:58 | Monza, Italy | Catchweight (157 lb) bout. |
| Win | 6–1 | Andrea Controversa | Submission (kimura) | Knockout in the Cage 3 | May 16, 2015 | 1 | 2:55 | Rome, Italy | |
| Win | 5–1 | Luca Vitali | Submission (guillotine choke) | Praedator FC: League Vercelli 2015 | April 19, 2015 | 1 | 2:25 | Vercelli, Italy | Welterweight bout. |
| Win | 4–1 | Jacopo Santini | Technical Submission (guillotine choke) | FederKombat: MMA Open Golden Cup 2015 | March 28, 2015 | 1 | N/A | Empoli, Italy | |
| Win | 3–1 | Francesco Sarullo | Submission (triangle choke) | FederKombat: MMA Open Golden Cup 2015 | March 28, 2015 | 2 | 1:20 | Empoli, Italy | |
| Win | 2–1 | Elia Madau | Submission (rear-naked choke) | Fight1: Night Warriors 2015 | March 7, 2015 | 1 | 3:00 | Pieve di Cento, Italy | Lightweight debut. |
| Loss | 1–1 | Angelo Rubino | Submission (armbar) | Cattivisinasce: In the Cage 3 | February 22, 2015 | 2 | 1:50 | Bologna, Italy | Welterweight debut. |
| Win | 1–0 | Luca Puggioni | Submission (triangle choke) | Iron Fighters 14 | November 15, 2014 | 1 | 3:02 | Zoppola, Italy | Featherweight debut. |
