= 2023 in Konfrontacja Sztuk Walki =

Mixed martial arts events

Information
- First date: January 21, 2023
- Last date: December 16, 2023

Events
- Total events: 12

Fights
- Total fights: 112
- Title fights: 10

Chronology
2022 in KSW	2023 in Konfrontacja Sztuk Walki	2024 in KSW

The year 2023 was 20th year in the history of the Konfrontacja Sztuk Walki, a mixed martial arts promotion based in Poland. 2023 has begun with KSW 78. For 2023, besides its own channels KSW announced official distribution partnerships with Viaplay and Fight Network, to broadcast the promotion's Pay-per-view events.

== List of events ==
#	Event Title	Date	Arena	Location
1	XTB KSW 78: Materla vs. Grove 2	January 21, 2023	Netto Arena	Szczecin, Poland
2	KSW 79: De Fries vs. Duffee	February 25, 2023	Home Credit Arena	Liberec, Czech Republic
3	KSW 80: Ruchała vs. Eskiev	March 17, 2023	RCS Hall	Lubin, Poland
4	XTB KSW 81: Bartosiński vs. Szczepaniak	April 22, 2023	Ice Arena Tomaszów Mazowiecki	Tomaszów Mazowiecki, Poland
5	KSW 82: Hooi vs. Grzebyk	May 13, 2023	ATM Studio	Warsaw, Poland
6	XTB KSW 83: Colosseum 2	June 3, 2023	PGE Narodowy	Warsaw, Poland
7	KSW 84: De Fries vs. Bajor	July 15, 2023	Gdynia Arena	Gdynia, Poland
8	XTB KSW 85: Parnasse vs. Ruchała	August 19, 2023	Strzelecki Park Amphitheater	Nowy Sącz, Poland
9	KSW 86: Wikłacz vs. Przybysz 4	September 16, 2023	Hala Orbita	Wrocław, Poland
10	KSW 87: Stošić vs. Martínek	October 14, 2023	Werk Arena	Třinec, Czech Republic
11	XTB KSW 88: Rutkowski vs. Kaczmarczyk	November 11, 2023	Radom Sports Center	Radom, Poland
12	XTB KSW 89: Bartosiński vs. Parnasse	December 16, 2023	Gliwice Arena	Gliwice, Poland

== XTB KSW 78: Materla vs. Grove 2 ==
XTB KSW 78: Materla vs. Grove 2
- Promotion: Konfrontacja Sztuk Walki
- Date: January 21, 2023
- Venue: Netto Arena
- City: Szczecin, Poland

XTB KSW 78: Materla vs. Grove 2 was a mixed martial arts event held by Konfrontacja Sztuk Walki on January 21, 2023, in Szczecin, Poland.

=== Background ===
The main event was set to feature a heavyweight bout between Former professional boxer Artur Szpilka and former Glory fighter Arkadiusz Wrzosek. However, on November 16, Szpilka had to withdraw from the fight due to a back injury.

Bonus awards

The following fighters were awarded bonuses:

- Fight of the Night: Tomasz Romanowski vs. Radosław Paczuski
- Submission of the Night: Roman Szymański
- Knockout of the Night: Valeriu Mircea

=== Fight Card ===
KSW 78
Weight Class				Method	Round	Time	Notes
Middleweight 84 kg	(Poland) Michał Materla	def.	(United States) Kendall Grove	TKO (Punches)	2	4:27	
Middleweight 84 kg	(Poland) Tomasz Romanowski	def.	(Poland) Radosław Paczuski	Decision (Split)	3	5:00	
Lightweight 70 kg	(Poland) Roman Szymański	def.	(Georgia (country)) Raul Tutarauli	Submission (Armbar)	1	1:05	
Lightweight 70 kg	(Moldova) Valeriu Mircea	def.	(Poland) Borys Mańkowski	KO (Punches)	1	4:22	
Light Heavyweight 93 kg	(Brazil) Kleber Silva	def.	(Poland) Łukasz Sudolski	KO (Punches)	2	0:40	
Light Heavyweight 93 kg	(Poland) Rafał Kijańczuk	def.	(Germany) Marc Doussis	TKO (Punch)	1	2:03	
Lightweight 70 kg	(Poland) Łukasz Rajewski	def.	Sahil Siraj	TKO (Punches)	1	4:05	
Lightweight 70 kg	(Poland) Oskar Szczepaniak	def.	(Lithuania) Raimondas Krilavičius	Decision (Unanimous)	3	5:00	
Middleweight 84 kg	(Poland) Borys Dzikowski	def.	(Germany) Andre Langen	Decision (Unanimous)	3	5:00	

== KSW 79: De Fries vs. Duffee ==
KSW 79: De Fries vs. Duffee
- Promotion: Konfrontacja Sztuk Walki
- Date: February 25, 2023
- Venue: Home Credit Arena
- City: Liberec, Czech Republic

KSW 79: De Fries vs. Duffee was a mixed martial arts event held by Konfrontacja Sztuk Walki on February 25, 2023, at the Home Credit Arena in Liberec, Czech Republic .

=== Background ===
A heavyweight bout between two former kickboxers, Arkadiusz Wrzosek and Tomáš Možný, was booked for the event. The pair previously fought under kickboxing rules on October 16, 2015, with Možný winning by unanimous decision.

Bonus awards

The following fighters were awarded bonuses:

- Fight of the Night: Arkadiusz Wrzosek vs.Tomáš Možný
- Knockout of the Night: Brian Hooi and Ramzan Jembiev

=== Fight card ===
KSW 79
Weight Class				Method	Round	Time	Notes
Heavyweight 120 kg	(England) Phil De Fries (c)	def.	(United States) Todd Duffee	TKO (Punches)	1	3:46	For the KSW Heavyweight Championship
Middleweight 84 kg	(Czech Republic) Dominik Humburger	def.	(Brazil) Jorge Bueno	Decision (Unanimous)	3	5:00	
Heavyweight 120 kg	(Poland) Arkadiusz Wrzosek	def.	(Slovakia) Tomáš Možný	Decision (Unanimous)	3	5:00	
Heavyweight 120 kg	(Poland) Michał Kita	def.	(Poland) Daniel Omielańczuk	TKO (Punches)	3	2:06	
Welterweight 77 kg	(Netherlands) Brian Hooi	def.	(Bulgaria) Jivko Stoimenov	TKO (Punches and Elbow)	1	3:52	
Middleweight 84 kg	(Sweden) Andreas Gustafsson	def.	(Czech Republic) David Hošek	TKO (Punches)	1	2:33	
Catchweight 68.5 kg	(France) Ramzan Jembiev	def.	(Brazil) Murilo Delfino	KO (Head Kick)	2	0:19	
W.Catchweight 59 kg	(Poland) Natalia Baczyńska-Krawiec	vs.	(Czech Republic) Petra Částková	Decision (Unanimous)	3	5:00	
Middleweight 84 kg	(Slovakia) Matyas Viszlay	def.	(Czech Republic) Frederico Komuenha	Decision (Unanimous)	3	5:00	

== KSW 80: Ruchała vs. Eskiev ==
KSW 80: Ruchała vs. Eskiev
- Promotion: Konfrontacja Sztuk Walki
- Date: March 17, 2023
- Venue: RCS Hall
- City: Lubin, Poland

KSW 80: Ruchała vs. Eskiev was a mixed martial arts event held by Konfrontacja Sztuk Walki on March 17, 2023, at the RCS Hall in Lubin, Poland.

=== Background ===
Robert Ruchała was expected to face Dawid Śmiełowski for the interim KSW Featherweight Championship in the main event. Śmiełowski withdrew with an injury on February 25, and was replaced by Lom-Ali Eskiev.

Bonus awards

The following fighters were awarded bonuses:

- Fight of the Night: Kacper Koziorzębski vs. Borys Borkowski, Robert Ruchała vs. Lom Ali Eskiev
- Submission of the Night: Tom Breese
- Knockout of the Night: Andi Vrtačić

=== Fight card ===
KSW 80
Weight Class				Method	Round	Time	Notes
Featherweight 66 kg	(Poland) Robert Ruchała	def.	(Germany) Lom-Ali Eskiev	TKO (Punches and Elbows)	5	4:35	For the interim KSW Featherweight Championship
Middleweight 84 kg	(England) Tom Breese	def.	(Poland) Bartosz Leśko	Submission (Rear-Naked Choke)	1	2:45	
Light Heavyweight 93 kg	(France) Oumar Sy	def.	(Brazil) Henrique Da Silva	Submission (Rear-Naked Choke)	1	1:40	
Middleweight 84 kg	(Poland) Michał Michalski	def.	(Lithuania) Erikas Golubovskis	TKO (Elbows)	2	2:43	
W.Flyweight 57 kg	(Brazil) Yasmin Guimarães	def.	(Poland) Emilia Czerwińska	Decision (Unanimous)	3	5:00	
Featherweight 66 kg	(Moldova) Daniel Dănuț Tărchilă	def.	(Poland) Wojciech Kazieczko	Decision (Unanimous)	3	5:00	
Light Heavyweight 93 kg	(Poland) Damian Piwowarczyk	def.	(Poland) Bartłomiej Gładkowicz	TKO (Elbows and Punches)	1	2:39	
Welterweight 77 kg	(Poland) Kacper Koziorzębski	def.	(Poland) Borys Borkowski	Decision (Split)	3	5:00	
Catchweight 63 kg	(Poland) Kamil Szkaradek	def.	(Poland) Patryk Chrobak	Submission (Rear-Naked Choke)	1	2:24	
Middleweight 84 kg	(Croatia) Andi Vrtačić	def.	(Poland) Mateusz Janur	KO (Punch)	2	4:59	

== KSW 81: Bartosiński vs. Szczepaniak ==
XTB KSW 81: Bartosiński vs. Szczepaniak
- Promotion: Konfrontacja Sztuk Walki
- Date: April 22, 2023
- Venue: Ice Arena Tomaszów Mazowiecki
- City: Tomaszów Mazowiecki, Poland

XTB KSW 81: Bartosiński vs. Szczepaniak was a mixed martial arts event held by Konfrontacja Sztuk Walki on April 22, 2023, at the Ice Arena Tomaszów Mazowiecki in Tomaszów Mazowiecki, Poland.

=== Background ===
A KSW Welterweight championship bout between Adrian Bartosiński and Artur Szczepaniak was scheduled to headline the event.

Bonus awards

The following fighters were awarded bonuses:

- Submission of the Night: Maria Silva and Adrianna Kreft
- Knockout of the Night:Werlleson Martins and Adrian Bartosiński

=== Fight card ===
KSW 81
Weight Class				Method	Round	Time	Notes
Welterweight 77 kg	(Poland) Adrian Bartosiński	def.	(Belgium) (Poland) Artur Szczepaniak	TKO (Punches)	1	1:47	For the KSW Welterweight Championship
Heavyweight 120 kg	(Netherlands) Errol Zimmerman	def.	(Poland) Tomasz Sarara	TKO (Punches)	2	3:53	
Welterweight 77 kg	(Poland) Igor Michaliszyn	def.	(Poland) Krystian Bielski	TKO (Elbows)	2	3:29	
Bantamweight 61 kg	(Brazil) Werlleson Martins	def.	(Poland) Patryk Surdyn	KO (Knee)	3	0:12	
W.Flyweight 57 kg	(Poland) Adrianna Kreft	def.	(Poland) Karolina Owczarz	Submission (Arm-Triangle Choke)	1	1:13	
Welterweight 77 kg	(Poland) Marcin Krakowiak	def.	(Republic of Ireland) (Nigeria) Henry Fadipe	Decision (Unanimous)	3	5:00	
Heavyweight 120 kg	(Poland) Kamil Gawryjołek	def.	(Latvia) Oļegs Jemeļjanovs	TKO (Punches)	1	4:30	
W. Strawweight 52 kg	(Brazil) Maria Silva	def.	(Georgia (country)) Sofiia Bagishvili	Technical Submission (Rear-Naked Choke)	2	3:15	
Heavyweight 120 kg	(Poland) Filip Stawowy	def.	(Poland) Marek Samociuk	Submission (Rear-Naked Choke)	2	4:39	
Featherweight 66 kg	(Czech Republic) Josef Štummer	def.	(Poland) Jonatan Kujawa	Decision (Unanimous)	3	5:00	

== KSW 82: Hooi vs. Grzebyk ==
KSW 82: Hooi vs. Grzebyk
- Promotion: Konfrontacja Sztuk Walki
- Date: May 13, 2023
- Venue: ATM Studio
- City: Warsaw, Poland

KSW 82: Hooi vs. Grzebyk was a mixed martial arts event held by Konfrontacja Sztuk Walki on May 13, 2023, at the ATM Studio in Warsaw, Poland.

=== Background ===
A welterweight bout between Brian Hooi and Andrzej Grzebyk was booked as the main event, while a light heavyweight bout between Rafał Kijańczuk and Bohdan Gdnidko served as the co-main event.

Bonus awards

The following fighters were awarded bonuses:

- Fight of the Night: Andrzej Grzebyk and Brian Hooi
- Submission of the Night: Bohdan Gdnidko
- Knockout of the Night: Wilson Varela

=== Fight card ===
KSW 82
Weight Class				Method	Round	Time	Notes
Welterweight 77 kg	(Poland) Andrzej Grzebyk	def.	(Netherlands) Brian Hooi	Decision (Unanimous)	3	5:00	
Bantamweight 61 kg	(Poland) Sebastian Przybysz	def.	(Czech Republic) Filip Macek	TKO (Punches)	3	4:51	
Light Heavyweight 93 kg	(Ukraine) Bohdan Gdnidko	def.	(Poland) Rafał Kijańczuk	Submission (Armbar)	1	1:39	
Lightweight 70 kg	(Georgia (country)) Raul Tutarauli	def.	(Belgium) Donovan Desmae	Decision (Unanimous)	3	5:00	
Strawweight 52 kg	(Poland) Anita Bekus	def.	(Bulgaria) Aleksandra Toncheva	Decision (Unanimous)	3	5:00	
Lightweight 70 kg	(France) Wilson Varela	def.	(Poland) Gracjan Szadziński	TKO (Knee and Punches)	1	4:28	
Catchweight 79 kg	(Poland) Wiktor Zalewski	def.	(Poland) Robert Maciejowski	Decision (Unanimous)	3	5:00	

== XTB KSW 83: Colosseum 2 ==
XTB KSW 83: Colosseum 2
- Promotion: Konfrontacja Sztuk Walki
- Date: June 3, 2023
- Venue: PGE Narodowy
- City: Warsaw, Poland

XTB KSW 83: Colosseum 2 was a mixed martial arts event held by Konfrontacja Sztuk Walki on June 3, 2023, at the PGE Narodowy in Warsaw, Poland.

=== Background ===
Three KWS title fights were scheduled for the event: a KSW Lightweight Championship bout between champion Marian Ziółkowski and interim champion Salahdine Parnasse; a KSW Middleweight championship bout between champion Paweł Pawlak and challenger Tomasz Romanowski; as well as a KSW Bantamweight Championship between champion Jakub Wikłacz and Werlleson Martins. However, Martins wasn't medically cleared after issues with the weight cut and the bout was scrapped. Additionally, Ziółkowski injured his knee in the locker room while warming up for the championship bout, and subsequently relinquished the title.

A heavyweight bout between Arkadiusz Wrzosek and former two-time world kickboxing champion Bogdan Stoica is expected to take place at the event. Stoica will make his MMA and promotional debut.

Bonus awards

The following fighters were awarded bonuses:

- Fight of the Night: Michał Materla vs. Radosław Paczuski
- Knockout of the Night:Mamed Khalidov and Krzysztof Głowacki

=== Fight card ===
KSW 83
Weight Class				Method	Round	Time	Notes
Middleweight 84 kg	(Poland) Mamed Khalidov	def.	(England) Scott Askham	KO (Flying Switch Kick and Punches)	3	1:03	
Heavyweight 120 kg	(Poland) Artur Szpilka	def.	(Poland) Mariusz Pudzianowski	TKO (Punches)	2	0:31	
Middleweight 84 kg	(Poland) Paweł Pawlak	def.	(Poland) Tomasz Romanowski	TKO (Elbows)	5	3:25	For the KSW Middleweight Championship
Heavyweight 120 kg	(Poland) Arkadiusz Wrzosek	def.	(Romania) Bogdan Stoica	Submission (Forearm Choke)	1	2:09	
Middleweight 84 kg	(Poland) Michał Materla	def.	(Poland) Radosław Paczuski	KO (Punches)	1	1:37	
Lightweight 70 kg	(Moldova) Valeriu Mircea	def.	(Poland) Roman Szymański	Decision (Split)	3	5:00	
Featherweight 66 kg	(Poland) Daniel Rutkowski	def.	(Poland) Adam Soldaev	Decision (Unanimous)	3	5:00	
Lightweight 70 kg	(Czech Republic) Leo Brichta	def.	(Poland) Maciej Kazieczko	Decision (Split)	3	5:00	
Heavyweight 120 kg	(Poland) Krzysztof Głowacki	def.	(Poland) Patryk Tołkaczewski	KO (Punch)	1	1:33	
Catchweight 74 kg	(Poland) Mariusz Joniak	def.	(Poland) Sebastian Romanowski	Decision (Majority)	3	5:00	

== KSW 84: De Fries vs. Bajor ==
KSW 84: De Fries vs. Bajor
- Promotion: Konfrontacja Sztuk Walki
- Date: July 15, 2023
- Venue: Gdynia Arena
- City: Gdynia, Poland

KSW 84: De Fries vs. Bajor was a mixed martial arts event held by Konfrontacja Sztuk Walki on July 15, 2023, at the Gdynia Arena in Gdynia, Poland.

=== Background ===
A KSW Heavyweight Championship bout between current champion Phil De Fries and Szymon Bajor was booked as the main event, while a bantamweight bout between former champion Sebastian Przybysz and newcomer Islam Djabrailov served as the co-main event.

Bonus awards

The following fighters were awarded bonuses:

- Submission of the Night: Bartosz Leśko and Damian Stasiak
- Knockout of the Night: Darko Stošić and Gustavo Oliveira

=== Fight card ===
KSW 84
Weight Class				Method	Round	Time	Notes
Heavyweight 120 kg	(England) Phil De Fries (c)	def.	(Poland) Szymon Bajor	Technical Submission (Rear-Naked Choke)	2	4:57	For the KSW Heavyweight Championship
Bantamweight 61 kg	(Poland) Sebastian Przybysz	def.	(Germany) Islam Djabrailov	Technical Submission (Guillotine Choke)	3	1:21	
Middleweight 84 kg	(Poland) Damian Janikowski	def.	(Poland) Cezary Kęsik	Decision (Unanimous)	3	5:00	
Heavyweight 120 kg	(Serbia) Darko Stošić	def.	(Slovakia) Štefan Vojčák	KO (Punches)	3	2:34	
Middleweight 84 kg	(Poland) Bartosz Leśko	def.	(Serbia) Nemanja Nikolić	Submission (Rear-Naked Choke)	1	4:40	
Weltereight 77 kg	(Republic of Ireland) (Nigeria) Henry Fadipe	def.	(Poland) Krystian Kaszubowski	Decision (Split)	3	5:00	
Featherweight 66 kg	(Poland) Damian Stasiak	def.	(Germany) Pascal Hintzen	Submission (Triangle Choke)	1	2:50	
Bantamweight 61 kg	(Brazil) Gustavo Oliveira	def.	(Brazil) Bruno dos Santos	TKO (Doctor Stoppage)	3	1:52	
Middleweight 84 kg	(Poland) Damian Mieczkowski	def.	(Poland) Borys Dzikowski	Decision (Unanimous)	3	5:00	
Bantamweight 61 kg	(Poland) Patryk Chrobak	vs.	(Poland) Miłosz Melchert	No Contest (Accidental Clash of Heads)	1	2:47	

== XTB KSW 85: Parnasse vs. Ruchała ==
XTB KSW 85: Parnasse vs. Ruchała
- Promotion: Konfrontacja Sztuk Walki
- Date: August 19, 2023
- Venue: Strzelecki Park Amphitheater
- City: Nowy Sącz, Poland

XTB KSW 85: Parnasse vs. Ruchała was a mixed martial arts event held by Konfrontacja Sztuk Walki on August 19, 2023, at the Strzelecki Park Amphitheater in Nowy Sącz, Poland.

=== Background ===
An unification KSW Featherweight Championship bout between current two-division champion Salahdine Parnasse and interim champion Robert Ruchała was booked as the event headliner, while a KSW Light Heavyweight Championship bout between current champion Ibragim Chuzhigaev and #3 ranked Bohdan Gdnidko served as the co-main event.

Bonus awards

The following fighters were awarded bonuses:

- Fight of the Night: Kamil Szkaradek and Patryk Surdyn
- Submission of the Night: Ibragim Chuzhigaev
- Knockout of the Night: Salahdine Parnasse

=== Fight card ===
KSW 85
Weight Class				Method	Round	Time	Notes
Featherweight 66 kg	(France) Salahdine Parnasse (c)	def.	(Poland) Robert Ruchała (ic)	KO (Soccer Kick to the Body)	2	4:14	For the unification KSW Featherweight Championship
Light Heavyweight 93 kg	(Turkey) Ibragim Chuzhigaev (c)	def.	(Ukraine) Bohdan Gdnidko	Submission (Arm-Triangle Choke)	2	4:14	For the KSW Light Heavyweight Championship
Featherweight 66 kg	(Poland) Patryk Kaczmarczyk	def.	(Moldova) Daniel Tărchilă	Decision (Unanimous)	3	5:00	
Bantamweight 61 kg	(Poland) Kamil Szkaradek	def.	(Poland) Patryk Surdyn	Decision (Unanimous)	3	5:00	
Catchweight 95 kg	(Brazil) Kleber Silva	def.	(Poland) Rafał Kijańczuk	KO (Punches and Knee)	1	4:39	
Welterweight 77 kg	(Poland) Marcin Krakowiak	def.	(Poland) Michał Pietrzak	Decision (Split)	3	5:00	
Women's Flyweight 57 kg	(Brazil) Yasmin Guimarães	def.	(Poland) Adrianna Kreft	Decision (Unanimous)	3	5:00	
Catchweight 72 kg	(France) Wilson Varela	def.	(Poland) Łukasz Rajewski	Decision (Unanimous)	3	5:00	Rajewski missed weight (73.9 kg)
Women's Flyweight 57 kg	(Lebanon) Sandra Succar	def.	(Poland) Wiktoria Czyżewska	TKO (Punches)	3	2:34	Succar missed weight (57.6 kg)

== KSW 86: Wikłacz vs. Przybysz 4 ==
KSW 86: Wikłacz vs. Przybysz 4
- Promotion: Konfrontacja Sztuk Walki
- Date: September 16, 2023
- Venue: Hala Orbita
- City: Wrocław, Poland

KSW 86: Wikłacz vs. Przybysz 4 was a mixed martial arts event held by Konfrontacja Sztuk Walki on September 16, 2023, at the Hala Orbita in Wrocław, Poland.

=== Background ===
A tetralogy bout for KSW Bantamweight Championship between current champion Jakub Wikłacz and former champion Sebastian Przybysz was booked as the event headliner. The pairing first met at ACB 63 on July 1, 2017, which ended in a unanimous decision in favor of Wikłacz. Their second meeting took place at KSW 53: Reborn on July 11, 2020, where Przybysz won by TKO in the third round. Their third meeting took place at KSW 77 on December 17, 2022, where Wikłacz captured the title by split decision.

Bonus awards

The following fighters were awarded bonuses:

- Fight of the Night: Michał Michalski and Dominik Humburger
- Submission of the Night: Viktor Pešta
- Knockout of the Night: Damian Piwowarczyk

=== Fight card ===
KSW 86
Weight Class				Method	Round	Time	Notes
Bantamweight 61 kg	(Poland) Jakub Wikłacz (c)	vs.	(Poland) Sebastian Przybysz	Technical Decision (Unanimous Draw)	4	4:15	For the KSW Bantamweight Championship
Middleweight 84 kg	(Poland) Michał Michalski	def.	(Czech Republic) Dominik Humburger	Decision (Unanimous)	3	5:00	
Featherweight 66 kg	(Germany) Lom-Ali Eskiev	def.	(Poland) Dawid Śmiełowski	TKO (Elbows and Punches)	1	4:21	
Catchweight 81 kg	(Poland) (Belgium) Artur Szczepaniak	def.	(Republic of Ireland) Henry Fadipe	KO (Punch)	2	4:00	
Welterweight 77 kg	(Poland) Wiktor Zalewski	def.	(Poland) Kacper Koziorzębski	TKO (Punches)	2	0:55	
Light Heavyweight 93 kg	(Poland) Damian Piwowarczyk	def.	(Poland) Łukasz Sudolski	KO (Punch)	1	3:38	
Heavyweight 120 kg	(Czech Republic) Viktor Pešta	def	(Poland) Filip Stawowy	Submission (Rear-Naked Choke)	1	2:12	
Bantamweight 61 kg	(Serbia) Miljan Zdravković	def.	(Poland) Mariusz Joniak	KO (Punches)	1	4:16	
Welterweight 77 kg	(Poland) Oskar Szczepaniak	def.	(Poland) Adrian Gralak	KO (Punch)	1	4:29	

== KSW 87: Stošić vs. Martínek ==
KSW 87: Stošić vs. Martínek
- Promotion: Konfrontacja Sztuk Walki
- Date: October 14, 2023
- Venue: Werk Arena
- City: Třinec, Czech Republic

KSW 87: Stošić vs. Martínek was a mixed martial arts event held by Konfrontacja Sztuk Walki on October 14, 2023, at the Werk Arena in Třinec, Czech Republic.

=== Background ===
A heavyweight bout between former title challenger Darko Stošić and former Heavyweight Oktagon MMA champion Michal Martínek was booked as the main event.

Bonus awards

The following fighters were awarded bonuses:

- Fight of the Night: Leo Brichta and Roman Szymański
- Submission of the Night: Oleksii Polischuck
- Knockout of the Night: Darko Stošić and Sahil Siraj

=== Fight card ===
KSW 87
Weight Class				Method	Round	Time	Notes
Heavyweight 120 kg	(Serbia) Darko Stošić	def.	(Czech Republic) Michal Martínek	KO (Punch)	1	2:04	
Lightweight 70 kg	(Czech Republic) Leo Brichta	def.	(Poland) Roman Szymański	TKO (Punches)	3	4:15	
Light Heavyweight 93 kg	(Poland) Rafał Haratyk	def.	(Croatia) Ivan Erslan	KO (Punches)	1	4:21	
Bantamweight 61 kg	(Ukraine) Oleksii Polischuck	def.	(Czech Republic) Filip Macek	Submission (Triangle Armbar)	1	4:06	
Light Heavyweight 93 kg	(Poland) Michał Dreczkowski	def.	(Czech Republic) Vojtech Garba	Decision (Unanimous)	3	5:00	
Catchweight 87 kg	(Poland) Adrian Dudek	def.	(Czech Republic) Lukáš Dvořák	Decision (Unanimous)	3	5:00	
Catchweight 72 kg	(Sweden) Sahil Siraj	def.	(Austria) Ahmed Abdulkadirov	TKO (Punches)	1	3:16	Abdulkadirov (160 lbs / 72.6 kg) missed weight.
Featherweight 66 kg	(Poland) Dawid Kareta	def.	(Czech Republic) Josef Štummer	KO (Knees)	1	4:10	
Bantamweight 61 kg	(Poland) Tobiasz Le	def.	(Republic of Ireland) Carl McNally	TKO (Punches)	3	2:52	

== XTB KSW 88: Rutkowski vs. Kaczmarczyk ==
XTB KSW 88: Rutkowski vs. Kaczmarczyk
- Promotion: Konfrontacja Sztuk Walki
- Date: November 11, 2023
- Venue: Radom Sports Center
- City: Radom, Poland

XTB KSW 88: Rutkowski vs. Kaczmarczyk was a mixed martial arts event held by Konfrontacja Sztuk Walki on November 11, 2023, at the Radom Sports Center in Radom, Poland.

=== Background ===
A featherweight bout between former title challenger Daniel Rutkowski and Patryk Kaczmarczyk was booked as the main event.

Bonus awards

The following fighters were awarded bonuses:

- Fight of the Night: Patryk Kaczmarczyk vs. Daniel Rutkowski
- Submission of the Night: Konrad Rusiński
- Knockout of the Night: Marcin Wójcik

=== Fight card ===
KSW 88
Weight Class				Method	Round	Time	Notes
Featherweight 66 kg	(Poland) Patryk Kaczmarczyk	def.	(Poland) Daniel Rutkowski	Decision (Unanimous)	3	5:00	
Middleweight 84 kg	(Poland) Piotr Kuberski	def.	(Poland) Bartosz Leśko	KO (Punches)	3	1:11	
Light Heavyweight 93 kg	(Poland) Marcin Wójcik	def.	(Brazil) Henrique da Silva	KO (Punch)	2	0:33	
Middleweight 84 kg	(Poland) Albert Odzimkowski	def.	(Brazil) Jorge Bueno	KO (Punch)	2	1:28	
Heavyweight 120 kg	(Slovakia) Štefan Vojčák	def.	(Poland) Kamil Gawryjołek	TKO (Punches)	1	1:06	
Featherweight 66 kg	(Moldova) Daniel Tărchilă	def.	(Ukraine) Vladyslav Falbiychuk	Submission (Rear-Naked Choke)	1	3:57	
Catchweight 72 kg	(France) Ramzan Jembiev	def.	(Poland) Fabian Łuczak	Submission (Rear-Naked Choke)	2	3:00	
Women's Strawweight 52 kg	(Brazil) Maria Silva	def	(Poland) Anita Bekus	Decision (Unanimous)	3	5:00	
Middleweight 84 kg	(Poland) Konrad Rusiński	def.	(Poland) Krystian Bielski	Submission (Rear-Naked Choke)	1	1:33	
Catchweight 80 kg	(Poland) Michał Gniady	def.	(Poland) Jacek Gać	TKO (Punches)	1	3:02	

== XTB KSW 89: Bartosiński vs. Parnasse ==
XTB KSW 89: Bartosiński vs. Parnasse
- Promotion: Konfrontacja Sztuk Walki
- Date: December 16, 2023
- Venue: Gliwice Arena
- City: Gliwice, Poland

XTB KSW 89: Bartosiński vs. Parnasse was a mixed martial arts event held by Konfrontacja Sztuk Walki on December 16, 2023, at the Gliwice Arena in Gliwice, Poland.

=== Background ===
A super fight for KSW Welterweight Championship between current undefeated champion Adrian Bartosiński and two-division (feather/Light weight classes) champion Salahdine Parnasse headlined the event.

If successful, Parnasse could become the first man to become champion of three divisions simultaneously in a major MMA organization.

Bonus awards

The following fighters were awarded bonuses:

- Fight of the Night: Damian Janikowski and Tomasz Romanowski
- Knockout of the Night: Wilson Varela

=== Fight card ===
KSW 89
Weight Class				Method	Round	Time	Notes
Welterweight 77 kg	(Poland) Adrian Bartosiński (c)	def.	(France) Salahdine Parnasse	Decision (Unanimous)	5	5:00	For the KSW Welterweight Championship
Middleweight 84 kg	(Poland) Paweł Pawlak (c)	def.	(Poland) Michał Materla	Decision (Unanimous)	5	5:00	For the KSW Middleweight Championship
Middleweight 84 kg	(Poland) Damian Janikowski	def.	(Poland) Tomasz Romanowski	Decision (Unanimous)	3	5:00	
Lightweight 70 kg	(Georgia (country)) Raul Tutarauli	def.	(Poland) Marcin Held	TKO (Punches)	2	3:49	
Welterweight 77 kg	(Poland) Andrzej Grzebyk	def.	(Latvia) Madars Fleminas	Decision (Unanimous)	3	5:00	
Heavyweight 120 kg	(Poland) Szymon Bajor	def.	(Czech Republic) Viktor Pešta	Decision (Split)	3	5:00	
Featherweight 66 kg	(Bosnia and Herzegovina) Ahmed Vila	def.	(Poland) Łukasz Charzewski	Decision (Unanimous)	3	5:00	
Lightweight 70 kg	(France) Wilson Varela	def.	(Poland) Sebastian Rajewski	KO (Kick to the body)	1	0:16	
Women's Flyweight 57 kg	(Poland) Emilia Czerwińska	def.	(Poland) Natalia Baczyńska-Krawiec	Decision (Unanimous)	3	5:00	
Featherweight 66 kg	(Poland) Michał Domin	def.	(Poland) Wojciech Kazieczko	Decision (Unanimous)	3	5:00	

== See also ==
- List of current KSW fighters
- 2023 in UFC
- 2023 in Bellator MMA
- 2023 in ONE Championship
- 2023 in Absolute Championship Akhmat
- 2023 in Rizin Fighting Federation
- 2023 in LUX Fight League
- 2023 in Brave Combat Federation
- 2023 in Road FC
