= 2022 in Konfrontacja Sztuk Walki =

Mixed martial arts events

Information
- First date: January 15, 2022
- Last date: December 17, 2022

Events
- Total events: 12

Fights
- Total fights: 107
- Title fights: 10

Chronology
2021 in KSW	2022 in Konfrontacja Sztuk Walki	2023 in KSW

The year 2022 was the 19th year in the history of the Konfrontacja Sztuk Walki, a mixed martial arts promotion based in Poland. 2022 will begin with KSW 66. For 2021, besides its own channels KSW announced official distribution partnerships with Viaplay and Fight Network, to broadcast the promotion's Pay-per-view events.

== Background ==
Martin Lewandowski announced that KSW has plans to expands even further into Europe and the organisation will hold 12 show in 2022.

== List of events ==
#	Event Title	Date	Arena	Location
1	KSW 66: Ziółkowski vs. Mańkowski	January 15, 2022	Netto Arena	Szczecin, Poland
2	KSW 67: De Fries vs. Stošić	February 26, 2022	Global EXPO	Warsaw, Poland
3	KSW 68: Parnasse vs. Rutkowski	March 19, 2022	Radom Sports Center	Radom, Poland
4	KSW 69: Przybysz vs. Martins	April 23, 2022	ATM studio	Warsaw, Poland
5	KSW 70: Pudzianowski vs. Materla	May 28, 2022	Atlas Arena	Łódź, Poland
6	KSW 71: Ziółkowski vs. Rajewski	June 18, 2022	Arena Toruń	Toruń, Poland
7	KSW 72: Romanowski vs. Grzebyk	July 23, 2022	Kadzielnia Amphitheater	Kielce, Poland
8	KSW 73: Wrzosek vs. Sarara	August 20, 2022	Arena COS Torwar	Warsaw, Poland
9	KSW 74: De Fries vs. Prasel	September 10, 2022	Arena Ostrów	Ostrów Wielkopolski, Poland
10	KSW 75: Stasiak vs. Ruchała	October 14, 2022	Strzelecki Park Amphitheater	Nowy Sącz, Poland
11	KSW 76: Parnasse vs. Rajewski	November 12, 2022	Sports and Entertainment Hall	Grodzisk Wielkopolski, Poland
12	KSW 77: Khalidov vs. Pudzianowski	December 17, 2022	Gliwice Arena	Gliwice, Poland

== KSW 66: Ziółkowski vs. Mańkowski ==
KSW 66: Ziółkowski vs. Mańkowski
- Promotion: Konfrontacja Sztuk Walki
- Date: January 15, 2022
- Venue: Netto Arena
- City: Szczecin, Poland

Event chronology
KSW 65	KSW 66: Ziółkowski vs. Mańkowski

KSW 66: Ziółkowski vs. Mańkowski was a mixed martial arts event held by Konfrontacja Sztuk Walki on January 15, 2022, at Netto Arena in Szczecin, Poland.

=== Background ===
The event featured two title fights. First, a KSW Lightweight Championship title bout between reigning champion Marian Ziółkowski and title challenger Borys Mańkowski was scheduled as the event headliner. The co-main event featured a light heavyweight bout for the KSW Light Heavyweight Championship between the reigning champion Tomasz Narkun and the challenger Ibragim Chuzhigaev.

Rafał Moks was expected to fight at the event. However, on December 17, ksw sports director Wojsław Rysiewski announced Moks' withdrawal from the bout due an injury.

Wojciech Janusz was originally supposed to compete in a light heavyweight bout against Przemysław Dzwonarek. However, Dzwonarek has to withdraw due to undisclosed reason. Damian Skarżyński stepped in at short notice to face Wojciech Janusz; the duel was a catchweight of 98 kg.

A welterweight bout between Tomasz Romanowski and Krystian Kaszubowski was planned for the event. However, Romanowski was forced to withdraw from the fight for medical reasons. Robert Maciejowski stepped in and fought Kaszubowski at middleweight.

Bonus awards

The following fighters were awarded bonuses:

- Fight of the Night: Ibragim Chuzhigaev vs. Tomasz Narkun
- Submission of the Night: Donovan Desmae
- Knockout of the Night: Gracjan Szadziński

=== Results ===
KSW 66
Weight Class				Method	Round	Time	Notes
Lightweight 70 kg	(Poland) Marian Ziółkowski (c)	def.	(Poland) Borys Mańkowski	Decision (Unanimous)	5	5:00	For the KSW Lightweight Championship
Light Heavyweight 93 kg	(Turkey) Ibragim Chuzhigaev	def.	(Poland) Tomasz Narkun (c)	Decision (Unanimous)	5	5:00	For the KSW Light Heavyweight Championship
Middleweight 84 kg	(Poland) Michał Materla	def.	(England) Jason Radcliffe	TKO (Punches)	1	4:07	
Middleweight 84 kg	(Poland) Krystian Kaszubowski	def.	(Poland) Robert Maciejowski	Decision (Unanimous)	3	5:00	
Lightweight 70 kg	(Poland) Sebastian Rajewski	def.	(Sweden) Niklas Bäckström	Decision (Unanimous)	3	5:00	
Catchweight 98 kg	(Poland) Wojciech Janusz	def.	(Poland) Damian Skarżyński	Submission (Rear-Naked Choke)	1	2:04	
Lightweight 70 kg	(Belgium) Donovan Desmae	def.	(Poland) Łukasz Rajewski	Submission (Triangle Armbar)	2	4:07	
Preliminary Card
Catchweight 73 kg	(Poland) Gracjan Szadziński	def.	(Italy) Francesco Moricca	KO (Punches)	2	1:58	
Welterweight 77 kg	(Poland) Kacper Koziorzębski	def.	(Poland) Hubert Szymajda	Decision (Unanimous)	3	5:00	
Bantamweight 61 kg	(Poland) Patryk Surdyn	def.	(Czech Republic) Dawid Martinik	Decision (Unanimous)	3	5:00	

== KSW 67: De Fries vs. Stošić ==
KSW 67: De Fries vs. Stošić
- Promotion: Konfrontacja Sztuk Walki
- Date: February 26, 2022
- Venue: Global EXPO
- City: Warsaw, Poland

KSW 67: De Fries vs. Stošić was a mixed martial arts event held by Konfrontacja Sztuk Walki on February 26, 2022, at the Global EXPO in Warsaw, Poland.

=== Background ===
A KSW Heavyweight Championship bout between reigning champion Phil De Fries and title challenger Darko Stošić was booked as the main event.

A featherweight bout between Krzysztof Klaczek and Dawid Śmiełowski was planned for the event. However, on February 8, Klaczek has to withdraw from the fight due to illness. Filip Pejić stepped in for Klaczek, the bout will now be contest at 68.5 kg limit.

A light heavyweight bout between Hasan Mezhiev and Ivan Erslan was scheduled for the event. However, on February 24, Mezhiev was removed from the contest due to testing positive for COVID-19. He was replaced by Caio Bitencourt. However, in turn, Bitencourt fell ill during his weight cut and has to withdraw from the fight, the bout was cancelled.

Three fighters who missed weight are: Andrzej Grzebyk, who missed weight by one pound (77.9 kg/172 lb) and was fined 30% of his purse, Filip Pejic, who missed weight by one pound (69 kg/152 lb), and was also fined 30% of his purse, and finally, Idris Amizhaev — who missed weight by a full seven pounds heavy (82.9 kg/183 lb) for a 176 lb catchweight, and was fined 50% of his purse.

Bonus awards

The following fighters were awarded bonuses:

- Fight of the Night: Dawid Śmiełowski vs. Filip Pejić
- Submission of the Night: Adrian Bartosiński
- Knockout of the Night: Adam Soldaev

=== Results ===
KSW 67
Weight Class				Method	Round	Time	Notes
Heavyweight 120 kg	(England) Phil De Fries (c)	def.	(Serbia) Darko Stošić	TKO (Punches)	5	3:40	For the KSW Heavyweight Championship
Welterweight 77 kg	(Poland) Adrian Bartosiński	def.	(Poland) Andrzej Grzebyk	Submission (Kneebar)	2	0:33	
Catchweight 80 kg	(Poland) Igor Michaliszyn	def.	(Russia) Idris Amizhaev	TKO (Elbows)	1	1:06	
Catchweight 68.5 kg	(Poland) Dawid Śmiełowski	def.	(Croatia) Filip Pejić	TKO (Punches)	3	4:52	
Featherweight 66 kg	(Poland) Adam Soldaev	def.	(Germany) Pascal Hintzen	KO (Punch)	1	3:19	
Preliminary Card
Bantamweight 61 kg	(Georgia (country)) Zuriko Jojua	def.	(Germany) Shamil Banukayev	Submission (Armbar)	3	1:57	
Middleweight 84 kg	(Poland) Borys Borkowski	def.	(Poland) Arkadiusz Kaszuba	TKO (Elbows)	1	3:55	
Catchweight 73 kg	(Luxembourg) Yann Liasse	def.	(Poland) Oskar Szczepaniak	Decision (Unanimous)	3	5:00	

== KSW 68: Parnasse vs. Rutkowski ==
KSW 68: Parnasse vs. Rutkowski
- Promotion: Konfrontacja Sztuk Walki
- Date: March 19, 2022
- Venue: Radom Sports Center
- City: Radom, Poland

KSW 68: Parnasse vs. Rutkowski was a mixed martial arts event held by Konfrontacja Sztuk Walki on March 19, 2022, at the Radom Sports Center in Radom, Poland.

=== Background ===
A KSW Featherweight Championship bout between champion Salahdine Parnasse and title challenger Daniel Rutkowski was scheduled as the event headliner.

Welterweight Shamil Musaev, was expected to compete at KSW 68. However, on February 28, Musaev was removed from the card Because of the 2022 Russian invasion of Ukraine.

Bonus awards

The following fighters were awarded bonuses:

- Fight of the Night: Damian Janikowski vs Tomasz Jakubiec
- Submission of the Night: Salahdine Parnasse
- Knockout of the Night: Damian Janikowski

=== Results ===
KSW 68
Weight Class				Method	Round	Time	Notes
Featherweight 66 kg	(France) Salahdine Parnasse (c)	def.	(Poland) Daniel Rutkowski	Submission (Rear-Naked Choke)	4	1:07	For the KSW Featherweight Championship
Catchweight 80 kg	(Poland) Tomasz Romanowski	def.	(Poland) Michał Pietrzak	Decision (Unanimous)	3	5:00	
Middleweight 84 kg	(Poland) Damian Janikowski	def.	(Poland) Tomasz Jakubiec	KO (Punch)	1	3:42	
Heavyweight 120 kg	(Brazil) Ricardo Prasel	def.	(Poland) Michał Kita	TKO (Punches)	2	2:00	
Featherweight 66 kg	(Poland) Patryk Kaczmarczyk	def.	(Poland) Michał Domin	TKO (Punches)	2	2:15	
Middleweight 84 kg	(Poland) Albert Odzimkowski	NC	(Republic of Ireland) Tommy Quinn	No Contest (Overturned)	1	2:45	
Light Heavyweight 93 kg	(Poland) Rafał Kijańczuk	def.	(France) Yann Kouadja	TKO (Knee and Punches)	1	2:03	
Preliminary Card
Featherweight 66 kg	(Poland) Piotr Kacprzak	def.	(Brazil) Jose Marcos Lima Santiago Jr.	Decision (Unanimous)	3	5:00	
Light Heavyweight 93 kg	(Poland) Adam Tomasik	def.	(Poland) Marcin Trzciński	Decision (Unanimous)	3	5:00	

== KSW 69: Przybysz vs. Martins ==
KSW 69: Przybysz vs. Martins
- Promotion: Konfrontacja Sztuk Walki
- Date: April 23, 2022
- Venue: ATM studio
- City: Warsaw, Poland

KSW 69: Przybysz vs. Martins was a mixed martial arts event held by Konfrontacja Sztuk Walki on April 23, 2022, at the ATM studio in Warsaw, Poland.

=== Background ===
Sebastian Przybysz was scheduled to make the second defense of his KSW Bantamweight Championship against Zuriko Jojua, but Jojua had to withdraw due to a rib injury. Werlleson Martins makes his debut on short notice against Przybysz, the title fight served as the main event.

A middleweight bout between Paweł Pawlak and Cezary Kęsik was scheduled as the co-main event.

Bonus awards

The following fighters were awarded bonuses:

- Fight of the Night: Sebastian Przybysz vs. Werlleson Martins
- Submission of the Night: Sebastian Przybysz
- Knockout of the Night: Wojciech Kazieczko

=== Results ===
KSW 69
Weight Class				Method	Round	Time	Notes
Bantamweight 61 kg	(Poland) Sebastian Przybysz (c)	def.	(Brazil) Werlleson Martins	Submission (Rear-Naked Choke)	5	2:07	For the KSW Bantamweight Championship
Middleweight 84 kg	(Poland) Paweł Pawlak	def.	(Poland) Cezary Kęsik	Decision (Split)	3	5:00	
Catchweight 68 kg	(Poland) Robert Ruchała	def.	(Italy) Michele Baiano	Decision (Unanimous)	3	5:00	
W.Flyweight 57 kg	(Croatia) Sara Luzar Smajić	def.	(Poland) Natalia Baczyńska	Decision (Split)	3	5:00	
Lightweight 70 kg	(Poland) Maciej Kazieczko	def.	(France) Wilson Varela	TKO (Punches)	2	1:29	
Welterweight 77 kg	(Poland) (Belgium) Artur Szczepaniak	def.	(Bulgaria) Jivko Stoimenov	Submission (Rear-Naked Choke)	1	4:28	
Preliminary Card
Bantamweight 61 kg	(Poland) Paweł Polityło	def.	(Poland) Patryk Chrobak	Decision (Unanimous)	3	5:00	
Featherweight 66 kg	(Poland) Wojciech Kazieczko	def.	(Czech Republic) Luboš Lesák	TKO (Punches)	1	1:45	

== KSW 70: Pudzianowski vs. Materla ==
KSW 70: Pudzianowski vs. Materla
- Promotion: Konfrontacja Sztuk Walki
- Date: May 28, 2022
- Venue: Atlas Arena
- City: Łódź, Poland

KSW 70: Pudzianowski vs. Materla was a mixed martial arts event held by Konfrontacja Sztuk Walki on May 28, 2022, at the Atlas Arena in Łódź, Poland.

=== Background ===
The main event featured a heavyweight superfight between the former World's Strongest Man Mariusz Pudzianowski and the former KSW Middleweight Champion Michał Materla.

The co-main event featured the return to KSW of Daniel Omielańczuk against the former Chelsea F.C. goalkeeper Ricardo Prasel.

The undefeated prospect Radoslaw Paczuski would welcome the former Glory Middleweight Champion Jason Wilnis to the KSW middleweight division.

Sofiia Bagishvili was expected to face Anita Bekus in a flyweight bout at the event. However, Bagishvili pulled out a week before the event due to a wrist injury and she was replaced by promotional newcomer Roberta Zocco.

Bonus awards

The following fighters were awarded bonuses:

- Submission of the Night: Francisco Barrio & Ricardo Prasel
- Knockout of the Night: Ivan Erslan & Mariusz Pudzianowski

=== Results ===
KSW 70
Weight Class				Method	Round	Time	Notes
Heavyweight 120 kg	(Poland) Mariusz Pudzianowski	def.	(Poland) Michał Materla	KO (Punch)	1	1:47	
Heavyweight 120 kg	(Brazil) Ricardo Prasel	def.	(Poland) Daniel Omielańczuk	Submission (Ankle Lock)	1	1:48	
Light Heavyweight 93 kg	(Croatia) Ivan Erslan	def.	(Poland) Rafał Kijańczuk	KO (Punches)	1	3:13	
Heavyweight 120 kg	(Poland) Marek Samociuk	def.	(Poland) Izu Ugonoh	TKO (Punches)	1	3:38	
Light Heavyweight 93 kg	(Poland) Bartosz Leśko	def.	(Poland) Damian Piwowarczyk	Decision (Unanimous)	3	5:00	
Middleweight 84 kg	(Poland) Radosław Paczuski	def.	(Netherlands) Jason Wilnis	TKO (Finger Injury)	3	1:46	
W.Strawweight 52 kg	(Poland) Anita Bekus	def.	(Italy) Roberta Zocco	Decision (Unanimous)	3	5:00	
Preliminary Card
Catchweight 85.5 kg	(Poland) Albert Odzimkowski	def.	(Republic of Ireland) Tommy Quinn	TKO (Arm Injury)	1	2:56	
Catchweight 74 kg	(Argentina) Francisco Barrio	def.	(Poland) Łukasz Rajewski	Submission (Rear-Naked Choke)	2	2:51	

== KSW 71: Ziółkowski vs. Rajewski ==
KSW 71: Ziółkowski vs. Rajewski
- Promotion: Konfrontacja Sztuk Walki
- Date: June 18, 2022
- Venue: Arena Toruń
- City: Toruń, Poland

KSW 71: Ziółkowski vs. Rajewski was a mixed martial arts event held by Konfrontacja Sztuk Walki on June 18, 2022, at the Arena Toruń in Toruń, Poland.

=== Background ===
A KSW Lightweight Championship bout between the champion Marian Ziółkowski and title challenger Sebastian Rajewski was scheduled as the event headliner.

In the co-main event the former K-1, Glory and ONE Championship heavyweight Errol Zimmerman makes his KSW debut against ksw vetrant Marcin Różalski. The special rules fight featured three rounds of five minutes with K-1 rules in MMA gloves.

Bonus awards

The following fighters were awarded bonuses:

- Fight of the Night: Donovan Desmae vs. Artur Sowiński
- Fight of the Night: Daniel Torres vs. Borys Mańkowski

=== Results ===
KSW 71
Weight Class				Method	Round	Time	Notes
Lightweight 70 kg	(Poland) Marian Ziółkowski (c)	def.	(Poland) Sebastian Rajewski	Decision (Unanimous)	5	5:00	For the KSW Lightweight Championship
Heavyweight 120 kg	(Netherlands) Errol Zimmerman	def.	(Poland) Marcin Różalski	TKO (4 Knockdowns)	2	1:26	Special Rules Fight
Lightweight 70 kg	(Brazil) Daniel Torres	def.	(Poland) Borys Mańkowski	Decision (Unanimous)	3	5:00	
Catchweight 105 kg	(Poland) Artur Szpilka	def.	(Ukraine) Serhiy Radchenko	TKO (Submission to Elbow)	2	2:52	
Lightweight 70 kg	(Poland) Roman Szymański	def.	(Moldova) Valeriu Mircea	TKO (Hand Injury)	1	5:00	
Bantamweight 61 kg	(Poland) Jakub Wikłacz	def.	(Brazil) Bruno Augusto dos Santos	Decision (Unanimous)	3	5:00	
Heavyweight 120 kg	(Czech Republic) Michal Martínek	def.	(Poland) Filip Stawowy	Decision (Unanimous)	3	5:00	
Preliminary Card
Lightweight 70 kg	(Belgium) Donovan Desmae	def.	(Poland) Artur Sowiński	Submission (Rear-Naked Choke)	2	2:42	
Light Heavyweight 93 kg	(Germany) Marc Doussis	def.	(Poland) Przemysław Dzwoniarek	Submission (Guillotine Choke)	2	2:59	

== KSW 72: Romanowski vs. Grzebyk ==
KSW 72: Romanowski vs. Grzebyk
- Promotion: Konfrontacja Sztuk Walki
- Date: July 23, 2022
- Venue: Kadzielnia Amphitheater
- City: Kielce, Poland

KSW 72: Romanowski vs. Grzebyk was a mixed martial arts event held by Konfrontacja Sztuk Walki on July 23, 2022, at the Kadzielnia Amphitheater in Kielce, Poland.

=== Background ===
Three fighters who missed weight are: Tomasz Romanowski, who missed weight by six pounds (80.5 kg/177 lb) and was fined 50% of his purse, Oumar Sy, who missed weight by five pounds (95.6 kg/211 lb), and was also fined 50% of his purse, and finally, Hubert Szymajda — who missed weight by a one pound (71.3 kg/157 lb), and was fined 30% of his purse.

Bonus awards

The following fighters were awarded bonuses:

- Fight of the Night: Brian Hooi vs. Michał Pietrzak
- Knockout of the Night: Tomasz Romanowski and Dawid Śmiełowski

=== Results ===
KSW 72
Weight Class				Method	Round	Time	Notes
Welterweight 77 kg	(Poland) Tomasz Romanowski	def.	(Poland) Andrzej Grzebyk	TKO (Punches)	1	3:53	Romanowski missed weight (80.5 kgs)
Featherweight 66 kg	(Poland) Dawid Śmiełowski	def.	(Poland) Patryk Kaczmarczyk	KO (Kick to the Body)	2	2:51	
Weltererweight 77 kg	(Netherlands) Brian Hooi	def.	(Poland) Michał Pietrzak	TKO (Elbows)	1	3:20	
W.Flyweight 57 kg	(Poland) Emilia Czerwińska	def.	(Croatia) Sara Luzar Smajić	Decision (Unanimous)	3	5:00	
Light Heavyweight 93 kg	(France) Oumar Sy	def.	(Poland) Bartłomiej Gładkowicz	Decision (Unanimous)	3	5:00	Sy missed weight (95.6 kgs)
Bantamweight 61 kg	(Poland) Patryk Surdyn	def.	(Portugal) Gustavo Oliveira	Decision (Unanimous)	3	5:00	
Preliminary Card
Lightweight 70 kg	(Luxembourg) Yann Liasse	def.	(Poland) Hubert Szymajda	Decision (Unanimous)	3	5:00	Szymajda missed weight (71.3 kgs)
Welterweight 77 kg	(Poland) Robert Maciejowski	def.	(Poland) Arkadiusz Kaszuba	Decision (Split)	3	5:00	

== KSW 73: Wrzosek vs. Sarara ==
KSW 73: Wrzosek vs. Sarara
- Promotion: Konfrontacja Sztuk Walki
- Date: August 20, 2022
- Venue: Arena COS Torwar
- City: Warsaw, Poland

73: Wrzosek vs. Sarara was a mixed martial arts event held by Konfrontacja Sztuk Walki on August 20, 2022, at the Arena COS Torwar in Warsaw, Poland.

=== Background ===
Bonus awards

The following fighters were awarded bonuses:

- Fight of the Night: Tomasz Sarara vs. Arkadiusz Wrzosek
- Submission of the Night: Carl McNally
- Knockout of the Night: Bogdan Gnidko

=== Results ===
KSW 73
Weight Class				Method	Round	Time	Notes
Heavyweight 120 kg	(Poland) Arkadiusz Wrzosek	def.	(Poland) Tomasz Sarara	TKO (Knees and Punches)	3	3:55	
Featherweight 66 kg	(Poland) Daniel Rutkowski	def.	(Brazil) Reginaldo Vieira	Decision (Unanimous)	3	5:00	
Middleweight 84 kg	(Poland) Radosław Paczuski	def.	(England) Jason Radcliffe	KO (Punch)	1	2:40	
W.Flyweight 57 kg	(Poland) Karolina Owczarz	def.	(Poland) Natalia Baczyńska	Decision (Unanimous)	3	5:00	
Catchweight 82 kg	(Poland) Krystian Bielski	def.	(Moldova) Ion Surdu	TKO (Punches)	2	1:48	
Catchweight 97 kg	(Ukraine) Bogdan Gnidko	def.	(Poland) Damian Piwowarczyk	KO (Punch)	1	0:05	
Catchweight 83 kg	(Czech Republic) Dominik Humburger	def.	(Poland) Borys Borkowski	TKO (Punches)	2	2:30	
Preliminary Card
Featherweight 66 kg	(Germany) Pascal Hintzen	def.	(Poland) Patryk Likus	Submission (Rear-Naked Choke)	2	2:07	
Bantamweight 61 kg	(Republic of Ireland) Carl McNally	def.	(Poland) Miłosz Melchert	Submission (Rear-Naked Choke)	1	4:19	

== KSW 74: De Fries vs. Prasel ==
KSW 74: De Fries vs. Prasel
- Promotion: Konfrontacja Sztuk Walki
- Date: September 10, 2022
- Venue: Arena Ostrów
- City: Ostrów Wielkopolski, Poland

KSW 74: De Fries vs. Prasel was a mixed martial arts event held by Konfrontacja Sztuk Walki on September 10, 2022, at the Arena Ostrów in Ostrów Wielkopolski, Poland.

=== Background ===
A KSW Heavyweight Championship bout between the champion Phil De Fries and title challenger Ricardo Prasel was scheduled as the main event.

Two fighters who missed weight are: Paweł Polityło, who missed weight by four pounds (63.5 kg/140 lb) and was fined 40% of his purse, and Anita Bekus, who missed weight by two pounds (53.5 kg/118 lb) and was fined 30% of her purse.

Bonus awards

The following fighters were awarded bonuses:

- Submission of the Night: Phil De Fries, Sofiia Bagishvili
- Knockout of the Night: Tomasz Romanowski, Borys Dzikowski, Darko Stošić

=== Results ===
KSW 74
Weight Class				Method	Round	Time	Notes
Heavyweight 120 kg	(England) Phil De Fries (c)	def.	(Brazil) Ricardo Prasel	Submission (Rear-Naked Choke)	1	4:11	For the KSW Heavyweight Championship
Middleweight 84 kg	(England) Tom Breese	def.	(Poland) Damian Janikowski	Submission (Guillotine Choke)	2	1:55	
Heavyweight 120 kg	(Serbia) Darko Stošić	def.	(Poland) Michał Kita	KO (Punches)	2	2:54	
Middleweight 84 kg	(Poland) Tomasz Romanowski	def.	(Poland) Cezary Kęsik	TKO (Punches)	1	3:54	
Bantamweight 61 kg	(Brazil) Werlleson Martins	def.	(Poland) Paweł Polityło	Decision (Unanimous)	3	5:00	Polityło missed weight (63.5 kgs)
Welterweight 77 kg	(Norway) Emil Weber Meek	def.	(Poland) Kacper Koziorzębski	TKO (Elbows)	2	2:01	
W.Strawweight 52 kg	(Georgia (country)) Sofiia Bagishvili	def.	(Poland) Anita Bekus	Submission (Straight Armlock)	2	1:47	Bekus missed weight (53.5 kgs)
Lightweight 70 kg	(Poland) Wojciech Kazieczko	def.	(Ukraine) Eduard Demenko	Decision (Unanimous)	3	5:00	
Middleweight 84 kg	(Poland) Borys Dzikowski	def.	(Poland) Arkadiusz Mruk	KO (Head Kick and Punches)	1	0:40	

== KSW 75: Stasiak vs. Ruchała ==
KSW 75: Stasiak vs. Ruchała
- Promotion: Konfrontacja Sztuk Walki
- Date: October 14, 2022
- Venue: Strzelecki Park Amphitheater
- City: Nowy Sącz, Poland

KSW 75: Stasiak vs. Ruchała was a mixed martial arts event held by Konfrontacja Sztuk Walki on October 14, 2022 at the Strzelecki Park Amphitheater in Nowy Sącz, Poland.

=== Background ===
The event was initially scheduled to be headlined by Ibragim Chuzhigaev and Ivan Erslan for the KSW Light Heavyweight Championship. However, the reigning champion could not get into the country in time due to travel regulations and the bout was postponed, making Ruchała vs. Stasiak the main event.

Bonus awards

The following fighters were awarded bonuses:

- Fight of the Night: Robert Ruchała vs. Damian Stasiak
- Knockout of the Night: Henrique da Silva and Mădălin Pîrvulescu

=== Results ===
KSW 75
Weight Class				Method	Round	Time	Notes
Featherweight 66 kg	(Poland) Robert Ruchała	def.	(Poland) Damian Stasiak	Decision (Split)	3	5:00	
Heavyweight 120 kg	(Poland) Daniel Omielańczuk	def.	(Czech Republic) Michal Martínek	Decision (Split)	3	5:00	
Light Heavyweight 93 kg	(Brazil) Henrique da Silva	def.	(Poland) Tomasz Narkun	KO (Front Kick)	2	0:28	
Catchweight 67 kg	(Poland) Adam Soldaev	def.	(Ukraine) Oleksii Polischuk	Decision (Unanimous)	3	5:00	
Light Heavyweight 93 kg	(Romania) Mădălin Pîrvulescu	def.	(Poland) Adam Tomasik	TKO (Punches)	1	1:35	
Catchweight 73 kg	(Luxembourg) Yann Liasse	-	(Poland) Adrian Gralak	No Contest (Accidental Eye Poke)	1	2:38	
Preliminary Card
Bantamweight 61 kg	(Poland) Kamil Szkaradek	def.	(Czech Republic) David Martinik	Decision (Unanimous)	3	5:00	
W.Flyweight 57 kg	(Poland) Adrianna Kreft	def.	(Czech Republic) Petra Částková	Decision (Unanimous)	3	5:00	

== KSW 76: Parnasse vs. Rajewski ==
KSW 76: Parnasse vs. Rajewski
- Promotion: Konfrontacja Sztuk Walki
- Date: November 12, 2022
- Venue: Sports and Entertainment Hall
- City: Grodzisk Mazowiecki, Poland

KSW 76: Parnasse vs. Rajewski was a mixed martial arts event held by Konfrontacja Sztuk Walki on November 12, 2022 at the sports and entertainment hall in Grodzisk Mazowiecki, Poland.

=== Background ===
Marian Ziółkowski was scheduled to make the fourth defense of his KSW Lightweight title against the KSW Featherweight champion Salahdine Parnasse, however Ziółkowski had to withdraw due to a knee injury. He was replaced by Sebastian Rajewski and the bout was for the interim KSW Lightweight title.

Bartosz Leśko was set to face Paweł Pawlak in a middleweight bout, however Leśko suffered a hand injury and have to withdraw from the fight. Tom Breese steep in to replaced Leśko against Pawlak.

A Heavyweight bout between Filip Bradaric and Marek Samociuk was scheduled for this event. However, a week before the event Bradaric pulled out of the bout due to injury and was replaced by Kamil Gawryjołek.

Bonus awards

The following fighters were awarded bonuses:

- Fight of the Night: Maciej Kazieczko vs. Francisco Albano Barrio
- Submission of the Night: Henry Fadipe
- Knockout of the Night: Artur Szczepaniak

=== Results ===
KSW 76
Weight Class				Method	Round	Time	Notes
Lightweight 70 kg	(France) Salahdine Parnasse	def.	(Poland) Sebastian Rajewski	Submission (Rear-Naked Choke)	4	2:20	For the Interim KSW Lightweight Championship
Welterweight 77 kg	(Poland) Adrian Bartosiński	def.	(Poland) Krystian Kaszubowski	TKO (Punches)	1	4:58	
Middleweight 84 kg	(Poland) Paweł Pawlak	def.	(England) Tom Breese	TKO (Punches)	1	3:54	
Welterweight 77 kg	(Belgium) (Poland) Artur Szczepaniak	def.	(Netherlands) Brian Hooi	KO (Head Kick and Punches)	1	0:43	
Lightweight 70 kg	(Poland) Maciej Kazieczko	def.	(Argentina) Francisco Barrio	KO (Punches)	3	3:20	
Bantamweight 61 kg	(Georgia (country)) Zuriko Jojua	def.	(Croatia) Antun Račić	Decision (Unanimous)	3	5:00	
Middleweight 84 kg	(Republic of Ireland) Henry Fadipe	def.	(Poland) Albert Odzimkowski	Submission (Peruvian Necktie)	2	0:39	
Preliminary Card
Lightweight 70 kg	(Moldova) Valeriu Mircea	def.	(Poland) Gracjan Szadziński	KO (Punch)	1	1:39	
Heavyweight 120 kg	(Poland) Kamil Gawryjołek	def.	(Poland) Marek Samociuk	TKO (Punches)	1	4:37	

== KSW 77: Khalidov vs. Pudzianowski ==
KSW 77: Khalidov vs. Pudzianowski
- Promotion: Konfrontacja Sztuk Walki
- Date: December 17, 2022
- Venue: Gliwice Arena
- City: Gliwice, Poland

KSW 77: Khalidov vs. Pudzianowski will be a mixed martial arts event held by Konfrontacja Sztuk Walki on December 17, 2022 at the Gliwice Arena in Gliwice, Poland.

=== Background ===
Bonus awards

The following fighters were awarded bonuses:

- Fight of the Night: Jakub Wikłacz vs. Sebastian Przybysz, Ibragim Chuzhigaev vs. Ivan Erslan
- Submission of the Night: Michał Domin, Shamad Erzanukaev
- Knockout of the Night: Patryk Kaczmarczyk, Bogdan Gnidko

=== Results ===
KSW 77
Weight Class				Method	Round	Time	Notes
Heavyweight 120 kg	(Poland) Mamed Khalidov	def.	(Poland) Mariusz Pudzianowski	TKO (submission to punches)	1	1:54	
Bantamweight 61 kg	(Poland) Jakub Wikłacz	def.	(Poland) Sebastian Przybysz (c)	Decision (split)	5	5:00	For the KSW Bantamweight Championship
Light Heavyweight 93 kg	(Turkey) Ibragim Chuzhigaev (c)	def.	(Croatia) Ivan Erslan	Decision (unanimous)	5	5:00	For the KSW Light Heavyweight Championship
Featherweight 66 kg	(Poland) Daniel Rutkowski	def.	(Germany) Lom-Ali Eskiev	Decision (split)	3	5:00	
Catchweight 80 kg	(Poland) Andrzej Grzebyk	def.	(Brazil) Oton Jasse	KO (punch to the body)	1	4:21	
Featherweight 66 kg	(Poland) Patryk Kaczmarczyk	def.	(Germany) Pascal Hintzen	KO (knees)	1	1:03	
Light Heavyweight 93 kg	(Ukraine) Bohdan Gnidko	def.	(Romania) Mădălin Pîrvulescu	KO (head kick and punches)	1	0:38	
Preliminary Card
Featherweight 66 kg	(Poland) Michał Domin	def.	(Poland) Patryk Likus	Technical Submission (triangle choke)	3	4:33	
Lightweight 70 kg	(Luxembourg) Yann Liasse	def.	(Poland) Adrian Gralak	Submission (rear-naked choke)	2	2:37	
Bantamweight 61 kg	(Poland) Shamad Erzanukaev	def.	(Republic of Ireland) Carl McNally	Submission (rear-naked choke)	2	2:48	
W.Bantamweight 61 kg	(Poland) Wiktoria Czyżewska	def.	(Ukraine) Aleksandra Karaseva	TKO (punches)	1	1:12	

== See also ==
- List of current KSW fighters
- 2022 in UFC
- 2022 in Bellator MMA
- 2022 in ONE Championship
- 2022 in Absolute Championship Akhmat
- 2022 in Rizin Fighting Federation
- 2022 in LUX Fight League
- 2022 in AMC Fight Nights
- 2022 in Brave Combat Federation
- 2022 in Road FC
- 2022 Professional Fighters League season
- 2022 in Eagle Fighting Championship
- 2022 in Legacy Fighting Alliance
