= Radomskie Centrum Sportu =

Indoor arena in Poland

Coordinates: 51.4091°N 21.1715°E

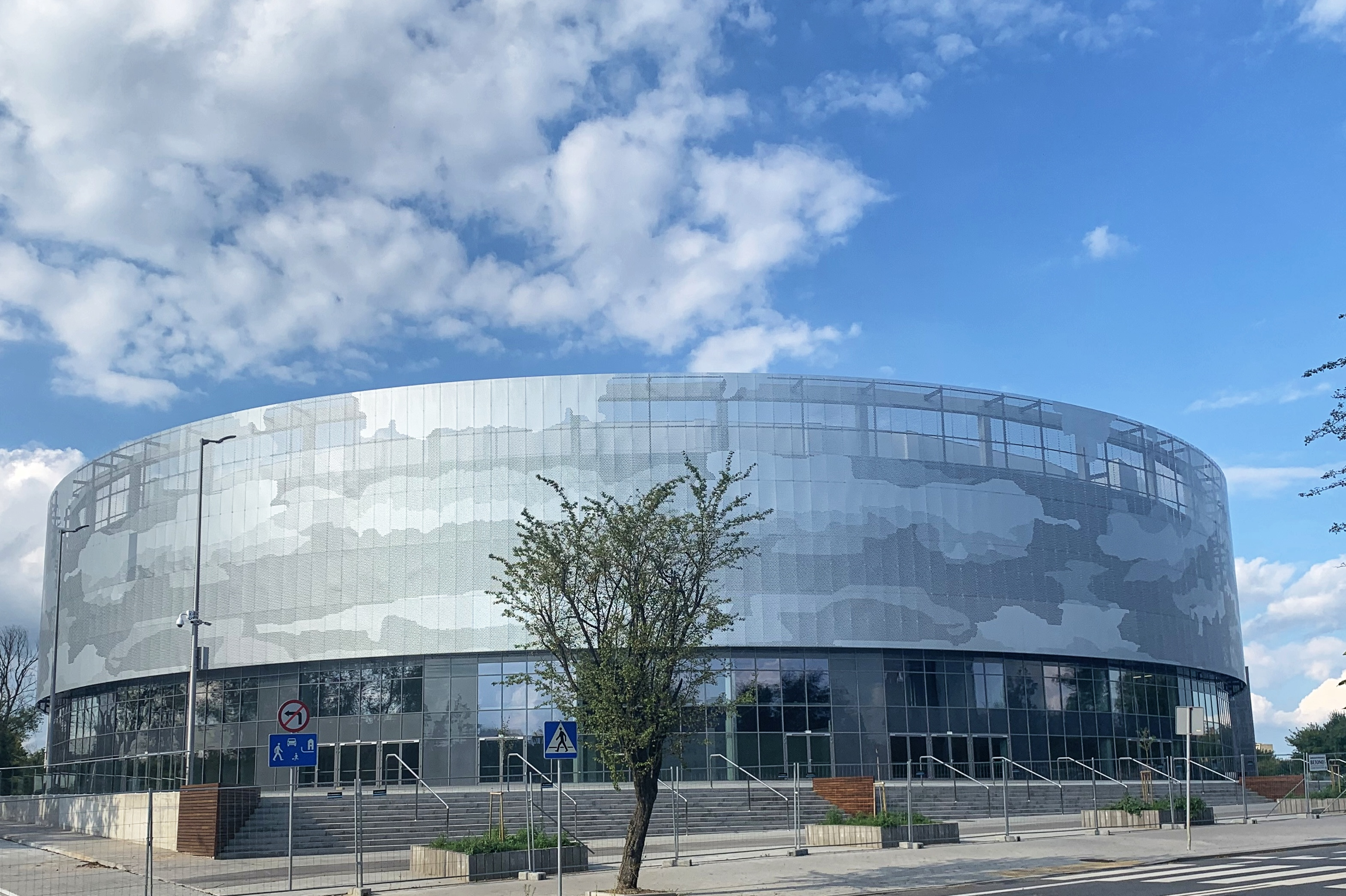
- Interactive map of Radomskie Centrum Sportu
- Full name: Radomskie Centrum Sportu - Hala Sportowo-Widowiskowa
- Location: ul. Andrzeja Struga 63, 26-610 Radom, Poland
- Capacity: 5,029

Construction
- Built: 2017–2021
- Opened: December 11, 2021

Tenants
- Czarni Radom (men's volleyball); Radomka Radom (women's volleyball); Elmas-KPS APR Radom (women's handball)

Radomskie Centrum Sportu, also known for the sponsorship reasons as Enea Radomskie Centrum Sportu or Enea RCS as its short commercial name, is an indoor arena in Radom, Poland.

The Radom Sports Center was commissioned in December 2021. The arena currently hosts volleyball teams Czarni Radom and Radomka Radom, and since 2026/27 season a handball team Elmas-KPS APR Radom.

== Notable events ==
=== Basketball ===
- 2024 Polish Basketball Supercup

=== Mixed martial arts ===
The arena has held four Konfrontacja Sztuk Walki events:

- KSW 68: Parnasse vs. Rutkowski (March 19, 2022)
- KSW 88: Rutkowski vs. Kaczmarczyk (November 11, 2023)
- KSW 102: Przybysz vs. Azevedo (January 25, 2025)
- KSW 114: Parnasse vs. Held (January 17, 2026)

The arena has also held two Babilon MMA events:

- Babilon MMA 29: Kacprzak vs. Zorczykowski (June 10, 2022)
- Babilon MMA 55: Łazarz vs. Kołecki 2 (November 21, 2025)

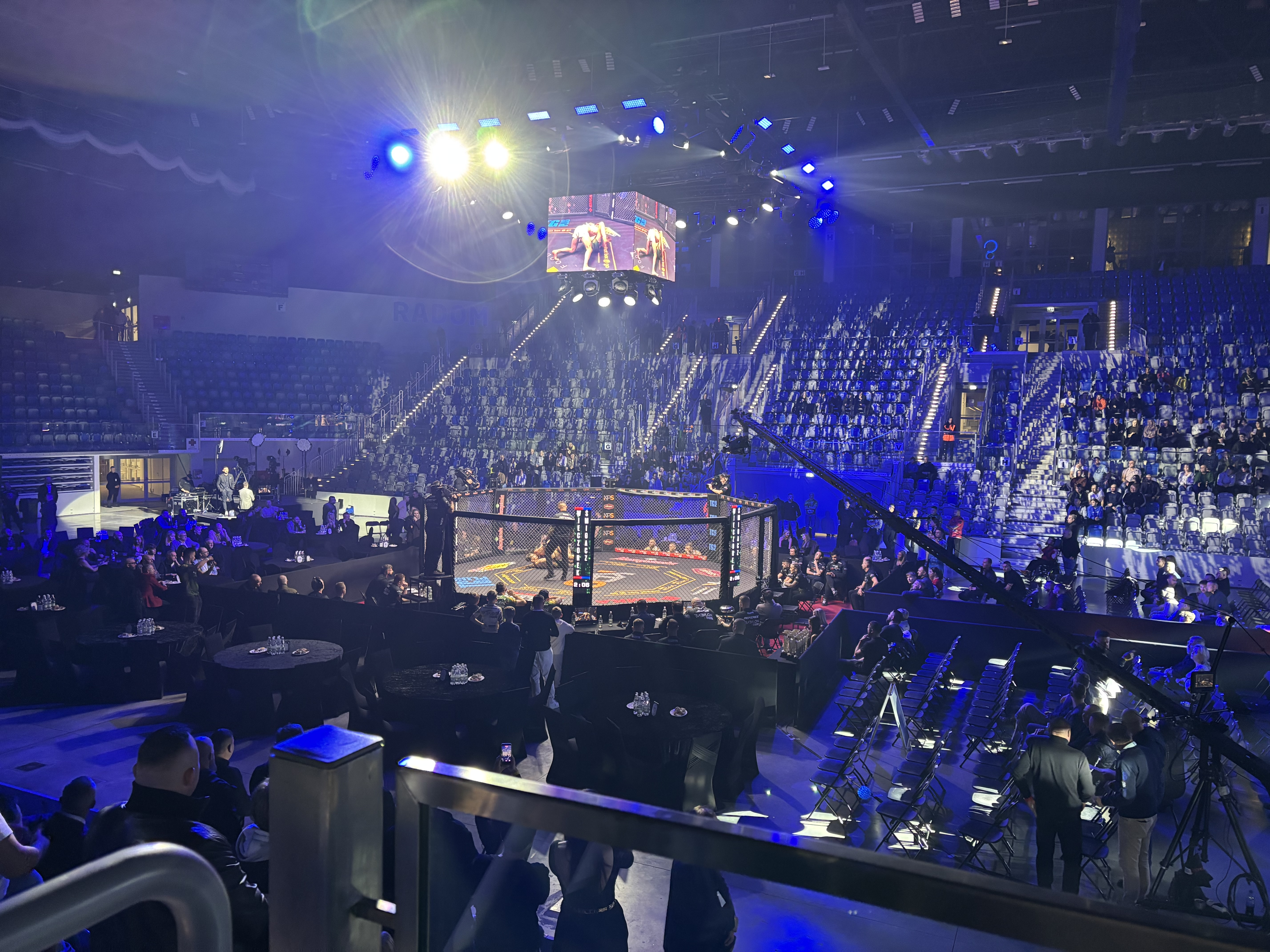
The arena in 2025 during Babilon MMA 55: Łazarz vs. Kołecki 2

== See also ==
- List of indoor arenas in Poland
