= List of current Konfrontacja Sztuk Walki fighters =

Konfrontacja Sztuk Walki (English: Martial Arts Confrontation) better known by its initials KSW, is widely considered to be the premiere mixed martial arts organization in Poland and one of the leading in Europe.

This list is an up-to-date roster of those fighters currently under contract with the KSW League. With fighters whose contract status cannot be determined, if will be included on this list if they have fought within the last two years for the promotion. Unlike the UFC, KSW does allow its fighters to compete in other promotions, so many fighters on this list may appear in MMA events outside of KSW. Each fight record has four categories: wins, losses, draws, and no-contests. All fight records in this article are displayed in that order, with fights resulting in a no-contest listed in parentheses.

== Notes ==
1. The tables are sortable and the calculation for Endeavor and MMA records (win–loss–draw (no contest)) are formulated as follows: Fight records calculation: (1) Plus one point of the total wins for fighters have not loss a fight; (2) Negative points of total loses for fighters have not won a fight; (3) Add number of wins to the winning percentage; (4) A draw counts as 0.5 (5) No contest does not factor as one of the variables of the calculation.
  - Plus one point of the total wins for fighters having not lost a fight: 5–0–0 = 6
  - Negative points of total losses for fighters having not won a fight: 0–3–0 = -3
  - Add number of wins to the winning percentage: 10–1–0 = 10.90 | 10 + (10/11)
  - A draw counts as 0.5: 8–4–1 = 8.65 | 8 + (8.5/13)
  - No contest does not factor as one of the variables of the calculation: 8–2–0 (1 NC) = 8.80 | 8 + (8/10)

== Fighters ==
=== Heavyweight (265 Ib, 120.2 kg) ===
| | Name | Nickname | MMA record | KSW record | Year of Last KSW fight |
|---|---|---|---|---|---|
| England | Phil De Fries (C) | F-11 | 28–6 (1) | 14–0 | 2025 |
| Poland | Marcin Wójcik | The Giant | 22–10 | 8–5 | 2025 |
| Poland | Arkadiusz Wrzosek | The Polish Hightower | 7–1 | 7–1 | 2026 |
| Poland | Marek Samociuk | | 13–5 | 5–3 | 2025 |
| Poland | Szymon Bajor | | 26–13 | 4–5 | 2025 |
| Czech Republic | Michal Martínek | Blackbeard | 12–7 | 3–4 | 2025 |
| Poland | Filip Stawowy | The Tank | 10–6 | 1–4 | 2025 |
| (Slovakia) | Štefan Vojčák | Mutant | 9–2 | 3–2 | 2025 |
| (Germany) | Ricardo Prasel | Alemão | 13–6 | 2–3 | 2025 |
| Poland | Kamil Gawryjołek | Mały | 5–2 | 2–2 | 2025 |
| Poland | Artur Szpilka | Szpila | 5–1 | 4–1 | 2025 |
| Brazil | Matheus Scheffel | Buffa | 18–13 | 1–3 | 2025 |
| Brazil | Augusto Sakai | | 17–7–1 | 1–2 | 2025 |
| Poland | Kacper Paczóski | | 4–0 | 1–0 | 2025 |

=== Light Heavyweight (205 Ib, 93 kg) ===
| | Name | Nickname | MMA record | KSW record | Year of Last KSW fight |
|---|---|---|---|---|---|
| Poland | Rafał Haratyk (C) | Polish Tank | 21–5–2 | 5–0 | 2025 |
| Poland | Damian Piwowarczyk | Piwo / Długi / Damsyn | 9–4 | 6–4 | 2025 |
| Poland | Bartosz Leśko | | 15–6–2 | 4–4 | 2025 |
| Poland | Rafał Kijańczuk | Kijana | 12–7 | 2–3 | 2023 |
| Turkey | Ibragim Chuzhigaev | The Million First | 19–5 | 3–0 | 2025 |
| Poland | Michał Dreczkowski | | 6–1 | 3–1 | 2025 |
| Poland | Dawid Kasperski | | 2–0 | 2–0 | 2024 |
| Poland | Sergiusz Zając | | 9–1 | 3–0 | 2025 |
| Poland | Bartosz Szewczyk | | 8–4–1 | 0–1 | 2025 |
| Canada Poland | Mariusz Książkiewicz | The Iron Pol | 11–3 | 0–1 | 2025 |
| Belgium | Cedric Lushima | Drik’o-Velli | 7–1 | 1–1 | 2025 |
| Poland | Kacper Sochacki | | 5–1 | 1–0 | 2026 |

=== Middleweight (185 Ib, 83.9 kg) ===
| | Name | Nickname | MMA record | KSW record | Year of Last KSW fight |
|---|---|---|---|---|---|
| Poland | Paweł Pawlak (C) | Plastinho | 25–4–1 | 7–0 | 2025 |
| Poland | Piotr Kuberski (IC) | Qbear | 16–1 | 4–0 | 2025 |
| Poland | Mamed Khalidov | Cannibal | 38–8–2 | 22–4–2 | 2024 |
| Poland | Damian Janikowski | | 10–9 | 9–9 | 2025 |
| Poland | Tomasz Romanowski | Tommy | 19–11 (1) | 7–4 | 2025 |
| Poland | Michał Michalski | Cukier | 14–5 | 8–3 | 2025 |
| Poland | Cezary Kęsik | Lublin's Tank / Polish Tank | 15–5 | 3–5 | 2025 |
| Poland | Albert Odzimkowski | Dzik / Złoty | 15–7 (1) | 3–4 (1) | 2024 |
| Poland | Radosław Paczuski | | 8–2 | 4–2 | 2024 |
| France Algeria | Laïd Zerhouni | Bulldozer | 15–10 | 4–2 | 2025 |
| Poland | Borys Dzikowski | | 4–2 | 3–2 | 2025 |
| Poland | Damian Mieczkowski | | 3–2 | 1–2 | 2025 |
| Poland | Wojciech Janusz | | 14–9 | 2–1 | 2025 |
| Croatia | Andi Vrtačić | | 6–2 | 2–0 | 2025 |
| Poland | Bartosz Kurek | | 5–0 | 3–0 | 2025 |
| Belgium | Alain Van De Merckt | Top Boy | 9–2 | 1–2 | 2025 |
| Poland | Mateusz Gola | Gruby | 6–7 | 0–1 | 2026 |
| Poland | Kacper Pakeltys | Sandro | 4–0 | 1–0 | 2026 |

=== Welterweight (170 Ib, 77.1 kg) ===
| | Name | Nickname | MMA record | KSW record | Year of Last KSW fight |
|---|---|---|---|---|---|
| Poland | Adrian Bartosiński (C) | Bartos | 18–1 | 11–1 | 2025 |
| Poland | Krystian Kaszubowski | Kris | 12–6 | 6–6 | 2025 |
| Poland | Marcin Krakowiak | Krakus | 13–5 | 5–4 | 2024 |
| Poland | Kacper Koziorzębski | Wiór | 11–6 | 5–4 | 2024 |
| Poland | Andrzej Grzebyk | Double Champ | 22–8 | 5–5 | 2025 |
| (Belgium) | Artur Szczepaniak | King/King Arthur | 12–3 | 5–2 | 2024 |
| Poland | Oskar Szczepaniak | | 7–2 | 4–2 | 2025 |
| (Republic of Ireland) | Henry Fadipe | Herculeez | 15–12–1 | 3–3 | 2025 |
| Poland | Igor Michaliszyn | | 12–3 | 4–1 | 2024 |
| Poland | Wiktor Zalewski | | 8–2 | 4–2 | 2025 |
| Poland | Adam Niedźwiedź | Niedziu | 9–4–1 | 2–1–1 | 2024 |
| Germany | Muslim Tulshaev | Urus | 14–4 | 4–1 | 2025 |
| Poland | Dawid Kuczmarski | Kuczmar | 8–0 | 3–0 | 2025 |
| Latvia | Madars Fleminas | Latvian Express | 14–7 | 2–3 | 2025 |
| Poland | Tymoteusz Łopaczyk | Honey Badger | 13–4 | 2–1 | 2025 |
| Poland | Mateusz Pawlik | | 7–2 | 2–0 | 2025 |
| Poland | Daniel Skibiński | Skiba | 22–10 | 1–1 | 2025 |
| Czech Republic | Steven Krt | | 6–4 | 1–2 | 2025 |
| Poland | Adrian Zieliński | | 24–14 | 0–2 | 2024 |
| Czech Republic | Viktor Červinský | | 4–2 | 0–2 | 2024 |
| France | Morgann Gbolou | | 4–3 | 0–1 | 2024 |
| France | Romain Debienne | | 11–7 | 0–2 | 2024 |
| France | Joël Kouadja | | 10–13 | 1–0 | 2025 |

=== Lightweight (155 Ib, 70.3 kg) ===
| | Name | Nickname | MMA record | KSW record | Year of Last KSW fight |
|---|---|---|---|---|---|
| Poland | Roman Szymański | Demolka | 17–9 | 8–6 | 2024 |
| Poland | Maciej Kazieczko | Kowadłoręki | 9–5 | 8–5 | 2025 |
| Poland | Marian Ziółkowski | Golden Boy | 25–11–1 (1) | 6–5 | 2025 |
| Moldova | Valeriu Mircea | The Solitary Wolf | 31–9–1 | 5–2 | 2025 |
| Poland | Bartłomiej Kopera | Małpa | 13–9 | 0–6 | 2025 |
| France | Ramzan Jembiev | Loup Noir | 6–2 | 3–1 | 2024 |
| (Poland) | Marcin Held | | 31–10 | 3–1 | 2025 |
| Poland | Szymon Karolczyk | | 8–3 | 3–1 | 2025 |
| France | Hugo Deux | Némésis | 6–1 | 3–1 | 2025 |
| France | Aymard Guih | Barakuda | 19–13–1 | 2–0 | 2024 |
| Brazil | Welisson Paiva | Mão de Pedra | 12–4–2 | 2–1 | 2025 |
| France | Amaury Wako-Zabo | Le Wakss | 5–0 | 3–0 | 2026 |
| Poland | Igor Włodarczyk | | 3–0 | 2–0 | 2025 |
| Poland | Kacper Fornalski | | 1–1 | 1–1 | 2025 |
| Poland | Krystian Blezień | | 9–6 | 1–2 | 2025 |
| France | El Hadji Ndiaye | Gaindeh | 6–3 | 1–1 | 2024 |
| Poland | Artur Krawczyk | | 5–5 | 0–2 | 2025 |
| Poland | Wojciech Kawa | Coffee | 9–4 | 1–1 | 2025 |
| Ukraine | Sasha Moisa | | 4–1 | 1–0 | 2025 |
| (Russia) | Adam Masaev | | 10–0 | 1–0 | 2025 |
| Poland | Mateusz Makarowski | Makaron | 14–7–1 | 2–0 | 2025 |

=== Featherweight (145 Ib, 65.8 kg) ===
| | Name | Nickname | MMA record | KSW record | Year of Last KSW fight |
|---|---|---|---|---|---|
| Poland | Patryk Kaczmarczyk (IC) | Prince of Radom | 13–3 | 7–3 | 2025 |
| Poland | Daniel Rutkowski | Rutek | 17–4 (1) | 5–2 | 2024 |
| Poland | Damian Stasiak | Webster | 14–10 | 3–4 | 2024 |
| Brazil | Werlleson Martins | Galinho | 19–8 | 2–4 | 2025 |
| Poland | Michał Domin | | 7–3 | 4–2 | 2024 |
| Poland | Adam Soldaev | Czhonkur | 10–3 | 5–2 | 2025 |
| Moldova | Daniel Tărchilă | | 8–3 | 3–2 | 2025 |
| Czech Republic | Leo Brichta | | 14–6 (1) | 4–2 | 2025 |
| Czech Republic | Josef Štummer | Air | 5–2 | 3–2 | 2025 |
| Poland | Piotr Kacprzak | | 12–6 | 3–2 | 2025 |
| Poland | Łukasz Charzewski | Harry | 14–3 (1) | 2–2 | 2025 |
| France | Alioune Nahaye | Le Jaguar | 16–4 | 2–0 | 2025 |
| Poland | Dawid Kareta | Kanar | 5–4 | 1–1 | 2024 |
| Poland | Kacper Formela | Polish Machida | 18–5 | 1–1 | 2024 |
| France | Nacim Belhouachi | | 4–4 | 1–1 | 2025 |
| (Brazil) | Julio Cesar Neves | Morceguinho | 36–3 | 0–2 | 2025 |
| France | Souheil Kaouchen | | 2–0 | 2–0 | 2025 |

=== Bantamweight (135 Ib, 61.2 kg) ===
| | Name | Nickname | MMA record | KSW record | Year of Last KSW fight |
|---|---|---|---|---|---|
| Poland | Sebastian Przybysz (C) | Sebić | 13–4–1 | 10–3–1 | 2025 |
| Poland | Patryk Surdyn | | 8–5 | 3–5 | 2025 |
| Ukraine | Oleksii Polischuck | | 15–6 | 4–3 | 2025 |
| Poland | Kamil Szkaradek | | 7–1 | 5–1 | 2025 |
| Poland | Mariusz Joniak | | 12–6 | 2–2 | 2024 |
| Poland | Tobiasz Le | | 6–2 | 3–1 | 2025 |
| France | Alfan Rocher-Labes | | 11–5 | 1–3 | 2025 |
| Brazil | Bruno Azevedo | Macaco | 21–5 | 1–1 | 2025 |
| Venezuela | Marcelo Morelli | El Diablo | 7–4 | 1–1 | 2025 |
| Switzerland | Kenji Bortoluzzi | | 11–6–1 | 0–1 | 2024 |
| (Poland) | Przemysław Górny | The Polish Wolf | 6–5 | 0–1 | 2025 |
| (Poland) | Sebastian Decowski | Joker | 6–0 | 1–0 | 2025 |
| (Ukraine) | Vitaliy Yakimenko | King | 10–2 | 1–0 | 2025 |
| (Brazil) | Rogério Bontorin | | 17–6 | 0–1 | 2025 |

=== Women's Flyweight (125 Ib, 56.7 kg) ===
| | Name | Nickname | MMA record | KSW record | Year of Last KSW fight |
|---|---|---|---|---|---|
| Poland | Wiktoria Czyżewska | Chicatoro | 5–1 | 4–1 | 2025 |
| Poland | Laura Grzyb | | 2–0 | 2–0 | 2025 |

=== Women's Strawweight (115 Ib, 52.2 kg) ===
| | Name | Nickname | MMA record | KSW record | Year of Last KSW fight |
|---|---|---|---|---|---|
| Poland | Ewelina Woźniak | The Mad Queen | 9–3 | 2–1 | 2025 |

| (C) | Indicates the current champion |
| (IC) | Indicates the current interim champion |

- Unless otherwise cited, all records are retrieved from tapology.com.

== See also ==
- 2025 in KSW
- List of current KSW Champions
- List of KSW events
- KSW Rankings
- List of current UFC fighters
- List of current ACA fighters
- List of current Brave CF fighters
- List of current Invicta FC fighters
- List of current Oktagon MMA fighters
- List of current ONE fighters
- List of current PFL fighters
- List of current Rizin FF fighters
- List of current Road FC fighters
