= Phil De Fries =

English mixed martial artist

- Born: 21 April 1986 (age 40); Cleethorpes, England, United Kingdom
- Other names: S-11
- Height: 6 ft 4 in (1.93 m)
- Weight: 264 lb (120 kg; 18 st 12 lb)
- Division: Heavyweight
- Reach: 79 in (201 cm)
- Fighting out of: Sunderland, England, United Kingdom
- Team: TFT MMA
- Rank: Purple belt in Brazilian Jiu-Jitsu
- Years active: 2009–present

Mixed martial arts record
- Total: 36
- Wins: 29
- By knockout: 8
- By submission: 16
- By decision: 5
- Losses: 6
- By knockout: 5
- By decision: 1
- No contests: 1

Other information
- Mixed martial arts record from Sherdog

Philip De Fries (born 21 April 1986) is a British mixed martial artist currently competing in the Heavyweight division of Konfrontacja Sztuk Walki, where he is the current KSW Heavyweight Champion. He holds the record for the most title defences and is the longest reigning KSW Champion in the organisation's history. A professional competitor since 2009, De Fries has formerly competed for the UFC, Bellator, and M-1 Global.

== Background ==
Born in Sunderland, De Fries is of Dutch origin through his paternal grandfather. He began training in Brazilian jiu-jitsu at the age of 14. He worked as a drugs counselor before and during his professional mixed martial arts career.

== Mixed martial arts career ==
=== Early career ===
Since the very beginning of his MMA career, De Fries has shown great submission skills, defeating the likes of Darren Towler and Stav Economou. He made his professional debut in 2009.

=== Ultimate Fighting Championship ===
After his win over Stav Economou, De Fries was scouted and signed a fight deal with the UFC.

De Fries was expected to make his debut against Oli Thompson at UFC 138. However, on 17 October 2011, it was revealed that Thompson had to pull out of the bout due to injury and was replaced by Rob Broughton. De Fries won the fight via unanimous decision.

In his second UFC fight, De Fries faced Stipe Miocic on 15 February 2012 at UFC on Fuel TV 1. He lost the fight via KO in the first round.

De Fries faced former strongman Oli Thompson at UFC on Fox 4. He won the fight via submission in the second round.

De Fries was expected to face Matt Mitrione on 29 December 2012 at UFC 155. However, Mitrione stepped up to fight Roy Nelson at The Ultimate Fighter: Team Carwin vs. Team Nelson Finale and was replaced by Todd Duffee. De Fries lost via first round TKO due to punches.

Mitrione vs. De Fries eventually took place on 6 April 2013 at UFC on Fuel TV 9. He lost the bout via knockout 19 seconds into the first round. Following the loss, De Fries was released from the promotion.

=== Post-UFC ===
Following his release from the UFC, De Fries returned to action on 31 December 2013 in Japan as he faced Strikeforce veteran Brett Rogers at Inoki Bom-Ba-Ye 2013. He won the fight via rear-naked choke in the first round.

He then faced Judo specialist Satoshi Ishii on the IGF 1 card which took place on 5 April 2014. De Fries lost this fight via unanimous decision.

=== Bellator MMA ===
De Fries made his Bellator MMA debut on 15 December 2017 at Bellator 191 against Pride FC vet James Thompson. He won the fight via submission in the first round.

=== KSW ===
On 8 February 2018 it was announced that De Fries had signed a four-fight contract with Polish MMA promotion Konfrontacja Sztuk Walki.

==== Heavyweight Championship reign ====
In the promotional debut De Fries faced Polish prospect Michał Andryszak for the vacant KSW Heavyweight Championship at KSW 43: Soldić vs. Du Plessis on 14 April 2018. De Fries won the fight via technical knockout in the first round and claimed the championship.

On 6 October 2018 De Fries made his first title defense against Karol Bedorf at KSW 45: The Return to Wembley, retaining his championship via keylock submission in the second round. He was awarded the Submission of the Night bonus award.

De Fries successfully defended his title against reigning KSW Light Heavyweight champion Tomasz Narkun at KSW 47 on 23 March 2019, winning the fight via unanimous decision.

De Fries was initially expected to make his next title defense against Damian Grabowski at KSW 50 on 14 September 2019. However, Grabowski was forced to withdraw from the bout due to an injury, and was replaced by Luis Henrique. De Fries won the fight by split decision.

In his 4th defense, De Fries faced Michał Kita on 19 December 2020 at KSW 57: De Fries vs. Kita. He won the fight via second-round TKO finish one minute into the second round.

De Fries rematched with Tomasz Narkun on 24 April 2021 at KSW 60: De Fries vs. Narkun 2. The pair previously met on 23 March 2019 in the main event at KSW 47: The X-Warriors, where De Fries defeated Narkun by unanimous decision and defended his KSW heavyweight title. He won the bout via ground and pound resulting in a TKO.

De Fries faced Darko Stošić at KSW 67 on 26 February 2022. He defended his title and won the bout via TKO after Stošić tapped due to combination of exhaustion and damage in the fifth round.

De Fries faced Ricardo Prasel on 10 September 2022 at KSW 74. He defeated Prasel at the end of the first round, choking him out via rear-naked choke. He was awarded his second Submission of the Night bonus award.

De Fries rematched Todd Duffee on 25 February 2023 at KSW 79. He defeated Duffee in the first round via ground and pound TKO.

De Fries faced Szymon Bajor on 15 July 2023 at KSW 84: De Fries vs. Bajor. He won the bout and defended the belt after putting Bajor unconscious with a rear-naked choke at the end of the second round.

De Fries faced Augusto Sakai at KSW 95, on 7 June 2024, winning by unanimous decision.

De Fries faced Darko Stošić in a rematch at KSW 100, on November 16, 2024. He won the bout via TKO in the first round, taking Stošić down several times before finishing him with ground strikes late in the round.

De Fries next faced former Glory Kickboxer Arkadiusz Wrzosek at KSW 107, on June 14, 2025. He won the bout via submission in the first round, taking Wrozek down and submitting him with a Keylock, a type of armlock submission.

De Fries faced Štefan Vojčák at KSW 111, on October 18, 2025. He won the bout via TKO in the third round, taking Vojčák down before stopping him with ground strikes.

De Fries then faced former KSW Light Heavyweight Title Challenger Marcin Wójcik, at KSW 117, on April 18, 2026. He won the bout via submission in the first round, taking Wójcik down before submitting him with a rear naked choke. This also won him the Submission of the Night award.

== Professional grappling career ==
De Fries faced Josh Barnett in a grappling match at XTB KSW Epic on February 24, 2024. Neither man submitted the other, and the match was ruled a draw.

== Personal life ==
De Fries has two daughters (born 2016 and 2018).

== Championships and Accomplishments ==
- Konfrontacja Sztuk Walki
  - KSW Heavyweight Championship (One time, current)
    - Fourteen successful title defenses
  - Submission of the Night (three times) vs. Karol Bedorf, Ricardo Prasel, and Marcin Wójcik
  - Most title defenses in KSW Heavyweight division history (14)
  - Most title defenses in KSW history (14)
  - Most wins in KSW championship bouts (15)
- Violent Money TV
  - VMTV UK MMA Male Fighter of the Year 2022

== Mixed martial arts record ==
Professional record breakdown
36 matches	29 wins	6 losses
By knockout	8	5
By submission	16	0
By decision	5	1
No contests	1	

Res.	Record	Opponent	Method	Event	Date	Round	Time	Location	Notes
Win	29–6 (1)	Marcin Wójcik	Submission (rear-naked choke)	KSW 117	April 18, 2026	1	4:08	Warsaw, Poland	Defended the KSW Heavyweight Championship. Submission of the Night.
Win	28–6 (1)	Štefan Vojčák	TKO (punches)	KSW 111	October 18, 2025	3	4:27	Třinec, Czech Republic	Defended the KSW Heavyweight Championship.
Win	27–6 (1)	Arkadiusz Wrzosek	Submission (keylock)	KSW 107	June 14, 2025	1	3:33	Gdańsk, Poland	Defended the KSW Heavyweight Championship.
Win	26–6 (1)	Darko Stošić	TKO (punches)	KSW 100	November 16, 2024	1	4:11	Gliwice, Poland	Defended the KSW Heavyweight Championship.
Win	25–6 (1)	Augusto Sakai	Decision (unanimous)	KSW 95	June 7, 2024	5	5:00	Olsztyn, Poland	Defended the KSW Heavyweight Championship.
Win	24–6 (1)	Szymon Bajor	Technical Submission (rear-naked choke)	KSW 84	15 July 2023	2	4:57	Gdynia, Poland	Defended the KSW Heavyweight Championship.
Win	23–6 (1)	Todd Duffee	TKO (punches)	KSW 79	25 February 2023	1	3:46	Liberec, Czech Republic	Defended the KSW Heavyweight Championship.
Win	22–6 (1)	Ricardo Prasel	Submission (bulldog choke)	KSW 74	10 September 2022	1	4:10	Ostrów Wielkopolski, Poland	Defended the KSW Heavyweight Championship. Submission of the Night.
Win	21–6 (1)	Darko Stošić	TKO (submission to punches)	KSW 67	26 February 2022	5	3:44	Warsaw, Poland	Defended the KSW Heavyweight Championship.
Win	20–6 (1)	Tomasz Narkun	TKO (punches)	KSW 60	24 April 2021	2	3:37	Łódź, Poland	Defended the KSW Heavyweight Championship.
Win	19–6 (1)	Michał Kita	TKO (punches)	KSW 57	19 December 2020	2	0:59	Łódź, Poland	Defended the KSW Heavyweight Championship.
Win	18–6 (1)	Luis Henrique	Decision (split)	KSW 50	14 September 2019	5	5:00	London, England	Defended the KSW Heavyweight Championship.
Win	17–6 (1)	Tomasz Narkun	Decision (unanimous)	KSW 47	23 March 2019	5	5:00	Łódź, Poland	Defended the KSW Heavyweight Championship.
Win	16–6 (1)	Karol Bedorf	Submission (keylock)	KSW 45	6 October 2018	2	4:26	London, England	Defended the KSW Heavyweight Championship. Submission of the Night.
Win	15–6 (1)	Michał Andryszak	TKO (punches)	KSW 43	14 April 2018	1	3:32	Wrocław, Poland	Won the vacant KSW Heavyweight Championship.
Win	14–6 (1)	James Thompson	Submission (guillotine choke)	Bellator 191	15 December 2017	1	1:33	Newcastle, England	
Win	13–6 (1)	Anton Vyazigin	Decision (majority)	M-1 Challenge 84	27 October 2017	3	5:00	Saint Petersburg, Russia	
Loss	12–6 (1)	Ivan Shtyrkov	TKO (elbows and punches)	RCC Boxing Promotions: Day of Victory 72	5 May 2017	1	1:51	Yekaterinburg, Russia	
Win	12–5 (1)	Thomas Denham	TKO (punches)	M4TC 22	26 November 2016	1	1:37	Houghton-le-Spring, England	
Loss	11–5 (1)	Thomas Denham	TKO (punches)	M4TC 16	28 February 2015	1	1:01	Houghton-le-Spring, England	
Win	11–4 (1)	Łukasz Parobiec	Submission (rear-naked choke)	M4TC 15	29 November 2014	1	2:03	Houghton-le-Spring, England	
Loss	10–4 (1)	Satoshi Ishii	Decision (unanimous)	Inoki Genome Fight 1	5 April 2014	2	5:00	Tokyo, Japan	
Win	10–3 (1)	Brett Rogers	Submission (rear-naked choke)	Inoki Bom-Ba-Ye 2013	31 December 2013	1	3:45	Tokyo, Japan	
Loss	9–3 (1)	Matt Mitrione	KO (punches)	UFC on Fuel TV: Mousasi vs. Latifi	6 April 2013	1	0:19	Stockholm, Sweden	
Loss	9–2 (1)	Todd Duffee	TKO (punches)	UFC 155	29 December 2012	1	2:04	Las Vegas, Nevada, United States	
Win	9–1 (1)	Oli Thompson	Submission (rear-naked choke)	UFC on Fox: Shogun vs. Vera	4 August 2012	2	4:16	Los Angeles, California, United States	
Loss	8–1 (1)	Stipe Miocic	KO (punches)	UFC on Fuel TV: Sanchez vs. Ellenberger	15 February 2012	1	0:43	Omaha, Nebraska, United States	
Win	8–0 (1)	Rob Broughton	Decision (unanimous)	UFC 138	5 November 2011	3	5:00	Birmingham, England	
Win	7–0 (1)	Stav Economou	Submission (rear-naked choke)	Ultimate Warrior Challenge 16	2 July 2011	2	3:56	Southend-on-Sea, England	
Win	6–0 (1)	Colin Robinson	Submission (armbar)	Supremacy Fight Challenge 2	29 May 2011	1	1:33	Gateshead, England	
Win	5–0 (1)	Andy Spiers	Submission (rear-naked choke)	Supremacy Fight Challenge 1	27 February 2011	1	3:14	Gateshead, England	
NC	4–0 (1)	Dave Wilson	NC (punches to the back of the head)	Tyneside Fighting Challenge 1	20 June 2010	1	N/A	Newcastle, England	
Win	4–0	Darren Towler	Submission (brabo choke)	Strike and Submit 14	30 May 2010	1	3:37	Gateshead, England	
Win	3–0	Grant Hocking	Submission (rear-naked choke)	Strike and Submit 13	28 February 2010	1	1:35	Gateshead, England	
Win	2–0	Jamie Sheldon	Submission (rear-naked choke)	Strike and Submit 12	4 October 2009	1	2:10	Gateshead, England	
Win	1–0	Darren Towler	Submission (rear-naked choke)	Strike and Submit 10	26 April 2009	1	4:48	Gateshead, England	Heavyweight debut.

== See also ==
- List of current KSW fighters
- List of male mixed martial artists
