= Josef Štummer =

Czech mixed martial artist (born 1996)

- Born: 28 December 1996 (age 29); Liberec, Czech Republic
- Other names: Air
- Height: 5 ft 10 in (1.78 m)
- Weight: 148 lb (67 kg; 10 st 8 lb)
- Division: Featherweight (2022–present)
- Reach: 68.1 in (173 cm)
- Stance: Orthodox
- Fighting out of: Liberec, Czech Republic
- Team: MMA Liberec
- Years active: 2022–present

Mixed martial arts record
- Total: 9
- Wins: 7
- By knockout: 1
- By submission: 2
- By decision: 4
- Losses: 2
- By knockout: 1
- By submission: 1

Other information
- Mixed martial arts record from Sherdog

Josef Štummer (born 28 December 1996) is a Czech professional mixed martial artist. He currently competes in the Featherweight division of Konfrontacja Sztuk Walki (KSW).

== Professional career ==
=== Early career ===
Štummer made his professional debut on July 23, 2022, against Bartosz Rewera. Štummer won the fight via a Unanimous Decision.

His next fight came on February 4, 2023, against Gergely Csibi. Štummer won the fight via a third-round submission.

=== Konfrontacja Sztuk Walki ===
Štummer made his debut under Konfrontacja Sztuk Walki (KSW) on April 22, 2023, against Jonatan Kujawa. Štummer won the fight via a Unanimous Decision.

His next fight came on October 14, 2023, against Dawid Kareta. Štummer lost the fight via a first-round knockout.

His next fight came on February 17, 2024, against Adrian Wieliczko. Štummer won the fight via a second-round submission. This fight earned him his first Submission of the Night bonus.

His next fight came on October 19, 2024, against Wojciech Kazieczko. Štummer lost the fight via a third-round submission.

His next fight came on February 21, 2025, against Nacim Belhouachi. Štummer won the fight via a first-round knockout. This fight earned him his first career Knockout of the Night bonus.

His next fight came on August 9, 2025, against Eduard Kexel. Štummer won the fight via a Unanimous Decision.

His next fight came on February 21, 2026, against Michał Domin. Before the bout began, he was deducted one point due to missing weight. Štummer won the fight via a Unanimous Decision.

== Championships and accomplishments ==
=== Mixed martial arts ===
- Konfrontacja Sztuk Walki
  - Submission of the Night (One time)
  - Knockout of the Night (One time)

== Mixed martial arts record ==
Professional record breakdown
10 matches	8 wins	2 losses
By knockout	1	1
By submission	2	1
By decision	5	0

Res.	Record	Opponent	Method	Event	Date	Round	Time	Location	Notes
Win	8–2	Łukasz Charzewski	Decision (split)	KSW 121	September 19, 2026	3	5:00	Liberec, Czech Republic	
Win	7–2	Michał Domin	Decision (unanimous)	KSW 115	February 21, 2026	3	5:00	Lubin, Poland	Štummer deducted one point before the fight due to missing weight (148 lb).
Win	6–2	Eduard Kexel	Decision (unanimous)	KSW 109	August 9, 2025	3	5:00	Warsaw, Poland	
Win	5–2	Nacim Belhouachi	KO (punch)	KSW 103	February 21, 2025	1	2:02	Liberec, Czech Republic	Knockout of the Night.
Loss	4–2	Wojciech Kazieczko	Submission (ninja choke)	KSW 99	October 19, 2024	3	4:09	Gliwice, Poland	
Win	4–1	Adrian Wieliczko	Submission (triangle choke)	KSW 91	February 17, 2024	2	4:20	Liberec, Czech Republic	Submission of the Night.
Loss	3–1	Dawid Kareta	KO (knees)	KSW 87	October 14, 2023	1	4:10	Třinec, Czech Republic	
Win	3–0	Jonatan Kujawa	Decision (unanimous)	KSW 81	April 22, 2023	3	5:00	Tomaszów Mazowiecki, Poland	
Win	2–0	Gergely Csibi	Submission (scarf hold)	Real Fight Arena 8	February 4, 2023	3	1:16	Budapest, Hungary	
Win	1–0	Bartosz Rewera	Decision (unanimous)	Real Fight Arena 3	July 23, 2022	3	5:00	Ostrava, Czech Republic	Featherweight debut.

== Submission grappling record ==
Professional Submission grappling record 1 Matche1, 1 Win (0 Submissions), 0 Losses (0 Submission), 0 Draws
Result	Rec.	Opponent	Method	Event	Date	Location
Win	1-0	(Czech Republic) Michael Pryjmačuk	Decision (points)	Tatamy 10 Beatdown	June 22, 2024	Brno, Czech Republic

== See also ==
- List of male mixed martial artists
- List of current Konfrontacja Sztuk Walki fighters
