= Vitalii Yakymenko =

Ukrainian mixed martial artist (born 1996)

- Born: August 30, 1996 (age 30); Kharkiv, Ukraine
- Native name: Віталій Якименко
- Height: 5 ft 5 in (1.65 m)
- Weight: 136 lb (62 kg; 9 st 10 lb)
- Division: Flyweight (2020–2021, 2023, 2024); Bantamweight (2021–present)
- Reach: 66.5 in (169 cm)
- Fighting out of: Kharkiv, Ukraine
- Team: Hunter MMA; Fight Club Gelsenkirchen
- Years active: 2020–present

Mixed martial arts record
- Total: 14
- Wins: 12
- By knockout: 4
- By submission: 5
- By decision: 3
- Losses: 2
- By knockout: 1
- By decision: 1

Other information
- Mixed martial arts record from Sherdog

Vitalii Yakymenko (Ukrainian: Віталій Якименко; born August 30, 1996) is a Ukrainian professional mixed martial artist. He is the current KSW Bantamweight Champion. Yakymenko has previously competed on Brave Combat Federation, and Fight Exclusive Night.

== Professional career ==
=== Early career ===
Yakymenko made his professional debut on August 23, 2020 against Sergey Litvinov. Yakimenko won the fight via a first-round submission.

=== Brave Combat Federation ===
After accumulating a career record of 4–1, Yakymenko made his debut under Bahraini-based federation Brave Combat Federation on April 23, 2023. He faced Mohammad Farhad. Yakimenko won the fight via Unanimous Decision.

=== Fight Exclusive Night ===
Yakymenko made his debut with Polish federation Fight Exclusive Night against Piotr Kamiński on August 25, 2023. Yakimenko won the fight via a second-round TKO.

=== Return to Brave Combat Federation ===
Yakymenko returned to Brave Combat Federation on December 5, 2023 against Maysara Mohamed. Yakimenko won the fight via a first-round submission.

=== Return to Fight Exclusive Night ===
Yakymenko returned to Fight Exclusive Night on February 17, 2024 against Ismaiel Haidari. Yakimenko won the fight via a second-round knockout.

His next fight came three months later on May 17 against Farid Alibabazade. The bout was originally supposed to be for the vacant FEN Flyweight championship, however Yakymenko missed weight which made him inelligible to win the championship. Yakymenko won the fight via a first-round submission.

His last fight with the federation came six months later on November 23 against Jan Ciepłowski. Yakymenko lost the fight via Split Decision.

=== Konfrontacja Sztuk Walki ===
On August 13, 2025, it was announced that Yakymenko has signed a contract with Konfrontacja Sztuk Walki He made his debut a month later on September 20 against former UFC fighter Rogério Bontorin. Yakymenko won the fight via a third-round TKO. This win earned him his first Knockout of the Night bonus.

==== KSW Bantamweight Champion ====
Yakymenko faced Sebastian Przybysz on February 21, 2026, for the KSW Bantamweight Championship. Yakymenko won the fight via a Split Decision, winning his first career championship.

== Championships and accomplishments ==
=== Mixed martial arts ===
- Konfrontacja Sztuk Walki
  - KSW Bantamweight Championship. (One time; current)
  - Knockout of the Night (One time)

== Mixed martial arts record ==
Professional record breakdown
14 matches	12 wins	2 losses
By knockout	4	1
By submission	5	0
By decision	3	1

Res.	Record	Opponent	Method	Event	Date	Round	Time	Location	Notes
Win	12–2	Marcelo Morelli	Submission (kneebar)	KSW 122	October 10, 2026	5	1:09	Rzeszów, Poland	Defended the KSW Bantamweight Championship. Fight of the Night.
Win	11–2	Sebastian Przybysz	Decision (split)	KSW 115	February 21, 2026	5	5:00	Lubin, Poland	Won the KSW Bantamweight Championship.
Win	10–2	Rogério Bontorin	TKO (punches)	KSW 110	September 20, 2025	3	4:30	Rzeszów, Poland	Knockout of the Night.
Loss	9–2	Jan Ciepłowski	Decision (split)	Fight Exclusive Night 57	November 23, 2024	3	5:00	Piotrków Trybunalski, Poland	Return to Bantamweight.
Win	9–1	Farid Alibabazade	Submission (rear-naked choke)	Fight Exclusive Night 54	May 17, 2024	1	3:52	Piła, Poland	For the vacant FEN Flyweight Championship. Yakymenko missed weight (128.5 lb) and was ineligible for the title.
Win	8–1	Ismaiel Haidari	TKO (punches)	Fight Exclusive Night 52	February 17, 2024	2	1:48	Ostrów Wielkopolski, Poland	Bantamweight bout.
Win	7–1	Maysara Mohamed	Submission (rear-naked choke)	Brave CF 77	December 5, 2023	1	2:10	Isa Town, Bahrain	Return to Flyweight.
Win	6–1	Piotr Kamiński	TKO (retirement)	Fight Exclusive Night 49	August 25, 2023	2	2:34	Mrągowo, Poland	
Win	5–1	Mohammad Farhad	Decision (unanimous)	Brave CF 70	April 23, 2023	3	5:00	Ljubljana, Slovenia	
Win	4–1	Albert Meliksetyan	TKO (punches)	Professional League Storm 2	December 18, 2021	1	2:50	Poltava, Ukraine	
Win	3–1	Albert Meliksetyan	Decision (unanimous)	World Warriors FC 20	September 25, 2021	3	5:00	Kyiv, Ukraine	Bantamweight debut.
Loss	2–1	Roman Akhremchik	KO (flying knee)	World Warriors FC 19	May 15, 2021	1	0:15	Kyiv, Ukraine	2021 WWFC Flyweight Grand Prix Quarterfinal.
Win	2–0	Ruslan Kolomiets	Submission (D'Arce choke)	Road to Kars FC 2	September 19, 2020	1	1:50	Kharkiv, Ukraine	
Win	1–0	Sergey Litvinov	Submission (guillotine choke)	Road to World Warriors FC: Kharkiv Open Cup Grand Final	August 23, 2020	1	4:07	Kharkiv, Ukraine	Flyweight debut.

== See also ==
- List of current mixed martial arts champions
- List of current Konfrontacja Sztuk Walki fighters
- List of male mixed martial artists
