= Marcin Held =

Polish mixed martial arts fighter

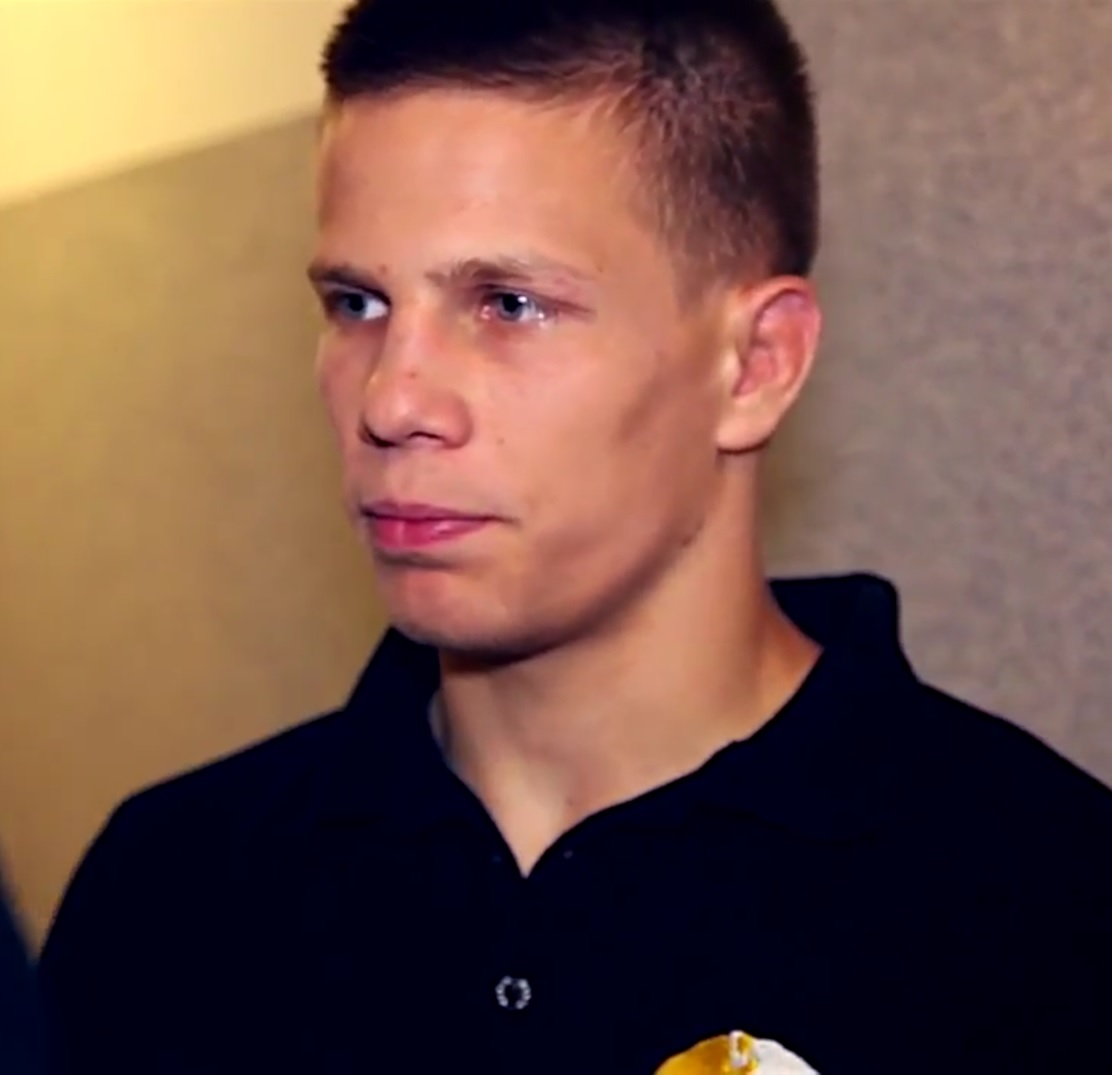
- Born: January 18, 1992 (age 34); Tychy, Poland
- Other names: The Polish Prodigy
- Height: 5 ft 9 in (1.75 m)
- Weight: 155 lb (70 kg; 11.1 st)
- Division: Lightweight
- Reach: 71 in (180 cm)
- Style: Submission wrestling, Brazilian Jiu-Jitsu
- Fighting out of: Tychy, Poland
- Team: Gracie Barra Bastion Tychy
- Rank: Black belt in Brazilian Jiu-Jitsu
- Years active: 2008–present

Mixed martial arts record
- Total: 43
- Wins: 32
- By knockout: 4
- By submission: 16
- By decision: 12
- Losses: 11
- By knockout: 3
- By submission: 1
- By decision: 7

Other information
- Mixed martial arts record from Sherdog

Marcin Held
Medal record

Representing Poland

Men's Submission grappling

FILA Grappling World Championships
Silver medal – second place	2010 Kraków	-70 kg (Gi)

FILA Grappling European Championships
Gold medal – first place	2011 Yuzhny	-75 kg (No-Gi)

ADCC Submission Wrestling European Championships
Bronze medal – third place	2010 Zagreb	-76.9 kg

Men's Submission wrestling

IBJJF Jiu-Jitsu European Championships
Gold medal – first place	2010 Lisbon	-70 kg (purple belt)

FIJJA World Professional Jiu-Jitsu Cup
Silver medal – second place	2012 Warsaw	Absolute (black/brown belt)

Men's Pankration

World Championships
Silver medal – second place	2010 Kraków	-75 kg

Marcin Held (born January 18, 1992) is a Polish mixed martial artist who competes in the Lightweight division of Konfrontacja Sztuk Walki (KSW), where he is the current KSW Lightweight Champion. He formerly competed in the Lightweight division of the Absolute Championship Berkut, Professional Fighters League, and Ultimate Fighting Championship. A professional MMA competitor since 2008, Held has competed frequently in his home country of Poland and is highly touted by the media, often being regarded as "the prodigy of Polish MMA". He fought in Bellator MMA from 2010 to 2016, challenging for the Bellator Lightweight Championship in 2015.

== Background ==
Held began training in submission grappling at the age of nine, with emphasis on submission wrestling controls and Sambo style leglock system. He also received a jiu-jitsu black belt at the age 21, becoming the youngest black belt in Poland. Held is well known for winning multiple submission grappling competitions in his home country. Since his MMA career has taken off, he still competes regularly in Submission Grappling, most notably for Quintet and Polaris. Though he fights at lightweight, he has expressed a desire to compete at featherweight, should the right fight become available.

== Mixed martial arts career ==
=== Early career ===
Held began his professional mixed martial arts career and compiled a 3–0 record before joining Shooto. His debut fight for the organisation was at Shooto Poland, where he headlined and defeated Rafal Lasota via TKO (leg injury). Just prior to the Shooto fight, Held was named as one of the top ten unsigned prospects to watch for 2009.

In December 2009, Held competed in an eight-man tournament, defeating all three opponents; the latter two by submission. Following this, Held defeated Przemyslaw Zbiciak via submission (rear naked choke) midway through the first round.

Held's first professional loss came at the hands of Lukasz Sajewski, a fellow highly rated prospect from Poland. Sajewski was able to neutralise the submission game of Held, before gaining top position and riding out a unanimous decision victory.

Held rebounded to defeat the former Cage Rage Lightweight Champion Jean Silva. Held attacked his opponent with a lot of leg locks, Jean didn't tap very good leg lock and after he stand up he fall down because of knee injury. Held won the fight via TKO.

Held was scheduled to participate in the inaugural event of a new Polish promotion - Infinite Fighting Federation - in October in Dąbrowa Górnicza, against German fighter Franco de Leonardis. However, due to an accident involving de Leonardis, he faced Bojan Kosednar. Held won the fight with a kneebar submission in the second round.

According to mmarocks, Held signed a contract to compete against Juha-Pekka Vainikainen in November at Iron Fist 3. However, for unknown reasons, Held was forced to pull out of the fight and was replaced by Anthony Durnell.

=== Bellator MMA ===
On October 14, Held signed with Bellator MMA to compete in their Season Four Lightweight Tournament. He faced wrestler Michael Chandler in the opening quarterfinal round at Bellator 36. He lost via arm-triangle choke submission in the first round.

Held faced Phillipe Nover at Bellator 59. He won the fight via split decision (29–28, 29–28, 29–28). Sherdog.com scored the bout 29–28 in favor of Nover.

Held faced Murad Machaev in the opening round of the Bellator Season 7 Lightweight Tournament Quarterfinal on October 19, 2012, at Bellator 77. He won the fight via unanimous decision. He faced Rich Clementi in the semifinals on November 16, 2012, at Bellator 81 and won via submission in the second round.

Held was expected to face Dave Jansen for the Season Seven Tournament Final at Bellator 84 but Held was not allowed in the Horseshoe casino, in Hammond, Indiana, where the event was being held since he was only 20 years old, and therefore the fight has been pushed to sometime during Bellator Fighting Championships: Season Eight.

The bout with Jansen was rescheduled for March 21, 2013, at Bellator 93. Held lost the fight via unanimous decision.

Held rebounded with a first-round KO win over Ryan Healy at Bellator 101.

Held next faced Rodrigo Cavalheiro in the Bellator Season 10 Lightweight Tournament quarterfinals at Bellator 113. He won the fight via submission in the first round. He faced Derek Anderson in the semifinals at Bellator 117 and won via submission in the second round. He faced Patricky Pitbull in the finals at Bellator 126 on September 26, 2014. Held dominated the fight and won via unanimous decision.

Held faced Alexander Sarnavskiy at Bellator 136 on April 10, 2015. He won the fight via verbal submission in the third round.

Held faced Will Brooks for the Bellator Lightweight Championship on November 6, 2015, at Bellator 145. Despite popping Brooks' knee in the opening round, Held lost the fight via unanimous decision.

Held had a rematch with Dave Jansen on May 20, 2016, at Bellator 155. He won the fight via unanimous decision. Despite getting the win, Bellator MMA announced they had released Held from his contract. Held, however, wrote a Facebook post citing that he terminated his own contract.

=== Ultimate Fighting Championship ===
On August 30, Held officially signed with the UFC.

Held made his promotional debut against UFC veteran Diego Sanchez on November 5, 2016, at The Ultimate Fighter Latin America 3 Finale. Despite having some success with his boxing and remaining active off his back looking for submissions, Held lost the bout by unanimous decision.

Held next faced Joe Lauzon on January 15, 2017, at UFC Fight Night 103. He lost the fight via a controversial split decision, with even his opponent Lauzon saying he felt he lost the bout post-fight. Likewise, 16 out of 17 media pundits scored the bout for Held; the lone holdout scored the fight a draw.

Held faced Damir Hadžović on May 28, 2017, at UFC Fight Night 109. After handily winning the first two rounds, he lost the fight via knockout in the opening seconds of the third round.

Held was expected to face Teemu Packalen on October 21, 2017, at UFC Fight Night 118. Teemu injured his knee and was replaced by Nasrat Haqparast. Held won the fight via unanimous decision to earn his first UFC win and fighting out his rookie contract.

=== Absolute Championship Berkut ===
Despite the UFC offering a new contract, Held decided to sign a contract with Absolute Championship Berkut and he faced Callan Potter in his debut at ACB 88. Held won the bout via submission in the first round.

=== Professional Fighters League ===
In March 2020, Held signed with Professional Fighters League.

Held made his PFL debut against Natan Schulte on April 23, 2021, at PFL 1. He won the bout via unanimous decision.

Held faced Olivier Aubin-Mercier at PFL 4 on June 10, 2021. He lost the bout via unanimous decision.

Held faced Natan Schulte on June 17, 2022, at PFL 4. He lost the bout via unanimous decision.

Held faced Myles Price on August 13, 2022, at PFL 8. He won the bout via guillotine choke in the second round.

=== Konfrontacja Sztuk Walki ===
On October 14, 2023 it was announced that Held signed with KSW and would make his debut against Raul Tutarauli on December 16, 2023 at KSW 89. Held lost the bout in the second round via TKO stoppage.

In his sophomore performance, Held faced Roman Szymański on June 7, 2024 at KSW 95, winning the bout via unanimous decision.

== Professional grappling career ==
Held competed in a superfight against Guram Kutateladze at ADXC 1 on October 20, 2023. He won the match by submission with an armbar.

Held then competed in the under 80 kg division of the Ocean BJJ Pro Championship on September 21, 2024. He submitted two opponents before losing in the semi-final to Fabyury Khrysthyan.

== Championships and accomplishments ==
=== Mixed martial arts ===
- Mixed Martial Arts Challengers
  - MMA Challengers 2 Lightweight Tournament Winner
- Bellator Fighting Championships
  - Bellator Season 10 Lightweight Tournament Winner
  - Bellator Season 7 Lightweight Tournament Runner-Up
  - Tied (with Michael Chandler and Adam Piccolotti) for most submission victories in Bellator Lightweight division (five)

=== Submission grappling ===
- ADCC Submission Wrestling World Championship
  - 2011 ADCC Submission Wrestling Polish Championships Gold Medalist
  - 2010 ADCC Submission Wrestling European Championships Bronze Medalist
- International Federation of Associated Wrestling Styles
  - 2011 FILA Grappling European Championships Senior No-Gi Gold Medalist
  - 2010 FILA Grappling World Championships Senior Gi Silver Medalist
- Polaris
  - 2018 Polaris 6 - Defeated Chris Fishgold by Armbar

=== Brazilian Jiu-Jitsu ===
- International Brazilian Jiu-Jitsu Federation
  - 2010 IBJJF European Open Jiu-Jitsu Championships Purple Belt Gold Medalist
- Federation International of Jiu-Jitsu Association
  - 2012 FIJJA World Professional Jiu-Jitsu Cup Warsaw Trials Absolute Brown/Black Belt Runner-up
  - 2012 FIJJA World Professional Jiu-Jitsu Cup Warsaw Trials Brown/Black Belt 3rd Place

=== Pankration ===
- International Brazilian Jiu-Jitsu Federation
  - 2010 FILA Pankration World Championships Senior Silver Medalist

== Mixed martial arts record ==
Professional record breakdown
43 matches	32 wins	11 losses
By knockout	4	3
By submission	16	1
By decision	12	7

Res.	Record	Opponent	Method	Event	Date	Round	Time	Location	Notes
Win	32–11	Valeriu Mircea	Decision (unanimous)	KSW 123	November 21, 2026	5	5:00	Szczecin, Poland	Won the vacant KSW Lightweight Championship.
Loss	31–11	Salahdine Parnasse	TKO (punches)	KSW 114	January 17, 2026	2	3:35	Radom, Poland	For the KSW Lightweight Championship.
Win	31–10	Marian Ziółkowski	Decision (unanimous)	KSW 112	November 15, 2025	3	5:00	Szczecin, Poland	
Win	30–10	Davy Gallon	Submission (guillotine choke)	KSW 101	December 20, 2024	1	2:24	Nanterre, France	Submission of the Night.
Win	29–10	Roman Szymański	Decision (unanimous)	KSW 95	June 7, 2024	3	5:00	Olsztyn, Poland	
Loss	28–10	Raul Tutarauli	TKO (punches)	KSW 89	December 16, 2023	2	3:49	Gliwice, Poland	
Win	28–9	Myles Price	Submission (guillotine choke)	PFL 9 (2022)	August 20, 2022	2	2:37	London, England	
Loss	27–9	Natan Schulte	Decision (unanimous)	PFL 4 (2022)	June 17, 2022	3	5:00	Atlanta, Georgia, United States	
Loss	27–8	Olivier Aubin-Mercier	Decision (unanimous)	PFL 4 (2021)	June 10, 2021	3	5:00	Atlantic City, New Jersey, United States	
Win	27–7	Natan Schulte	Decision (unanimous)	PFL 1 (2021)	April 23, 2021	3	5:00	Atlantic City, New Jersey, United States	
Win	26–7	Diego Brandão	Decision (unanimous)	ACA 96	June 8, 2019	3	5:00	Łódź, Poland	
Win	25–7	Musa Khamanaev	Submission (heel hook)	ACB 90	November 10, 2018	1	2:09	Moscow, Russia	
Win	24–7	Callan Potter	Submission (heel hook)	ACB 88	June 16, 2018	1	1:09	Brisbane, Australia	
Win	23–7	Nasrat Haqparast	Decision (unanimous)	UFC Fight Night: Cowboy vs. Till	October 21, 2017	3	5:00	Gdańsk, Poland	
Loss	22–7	Damir Hadžović	KO (knee)	UFC Fight Night: Gustafsson vs. Teixeira	May 28, 2017	3	0:07	Stockholm, Sweden	
Loss	22–6	Joe Lauzon	Decision (split)	UFC Fight Night: Rodríguez vs. Penn	January 15, 2017	3	5:00	Phoenix, Arizona, United States	
Loss	22–5	Diego Sanchez	Decision (unanimous)	The Ultimate Fighter Latin America 3 Finale: dos Anjos vs. Ferguson	November 5, 2016	3	5:00	Mexico City, Mexico	
Win	22–4	Dave Jansen	Decision (unanimous)	Bellator 155	May 20, 2016	3	5:00	Boise, Idaho, United States	
Loss	21–4	Will Brooks	Decision (unanimous)	Bellator 145	November 6, 2015	5	5:00	St. Louis, Missouri, United States	For the Bellator Lightweight World Championship.
Win	21–3	Alexander Sarnavskiy	Submission (kneebar)	Bellator 136	April 10, 2015	3	1:11	Irvine, California, United States	
Win	20–3	Patricky Freire	Decision (unanimous)	Bellator 126	September 26, 2014	3	5:00	Phoenix, Arizona, United States	Won the Bellator Season 10 Lightweight Tournament.
Win	19–3	Nate Jolly	Submission (armbar)	Bellator 120	May 17, 2014	1	4:20	Southaven, Mississippi, United States	
Win	18–3	Derek Anderson	Submission (triangle choke)	Bellator 117	April 18, 2014	2	3:07	Council Bluffs, Iowa, United States	Bellator Season 10 Lightweight Tournament Semifinal.
Win	17–3	Rodrigo Cavalheiro	Submission (toe hold)	Bellator 113	March 21, 2014	1	1:56	Mulvane, Kansas, United States	Bellator Season 10 Lightweight Tournament Quarterfinal.
Win	16–3	Ryan Healy	KO (punches)	Bellator 101	September 27, 2013	1	1:12	Portland, Oregon, United States	
Loss	15–3	Dave Jansen	Decision (unanimous)	Bellator 93	March 21, 2013	3	5:00	Lewiston, Maine, United States	Bellator Season 7 Lightweight Tournament Final.
Win	15–2	Rich Clementi	Submission (toe hold)	Bellator 81	November 16, 2012	2	3:04	Kingston, Rhode Island, United States	Bellator Season 7 Lightweight Tournament Semifinal.
Win	14–2	Murad Machaev	Decision (unanimous)	Bellator 77	October 19, 2012	3	5:00	Reading, Pennsylvania, United States	Bellator Season 7 Lightweight Tournament Quarterfinal.
Win	13–2	Derrick Kennington	Submission (heel hook)	Bellator 68	May 11, 2012	1	2:08	Atlantic City, New Jersey, United States	
Win	12–2	Phillipe Nover	Decision (split)	Bellator 59	November 26, 2011	3	5:00	Atlantic City, New Jersey, United States	
Win	11–2	Kaleo Kwan	Submission (inverted heel hook)	Australian FC 2	September 3, 2011	1	0:55	Melbourne, Australia	
Loss	10–2	Michael Chandler	Technical Submission (arm-triangle choke)	Bellator 36	March 12, 2011	1	3:56	Shreveport, Louisiana, United States	Bellator Season 4 Lightweight Tournament Quarterfinal.
Win	10–1	Bojan Kosednar	Submission (kneebar)	Infinite Fighting Federation: The Eternal Struggle	October 8, 2010	2	3:24	Dąbrowa Górnicza, Poland	
Win	9–1	Jean Silva	TKO (knee injury)	Pro Fight 5	June 18, 2010	2	2:30	Wrocław, Poland	
Loss	8–1	Łukasz Sajewski	Decision (unanimous)	Angels of Fire 7	May 29, 2010	2	5:00	Płock, Poland	
Win	8–0	Przemysław Zbiciak	Submission (rear-naked choke)	Ring XF 1	March 13, 2010	1	3:11	Zgierz, Poland	
Win	7–0	Borys Mańkowski	Submission (armbar)	MMA Challengers 2	December 6, 2009	1	2:10	Bytom, Poland	Won the MMA Challengers Lightweight Tournament.
Win	6–0	Mariusz Abramiak	Submission (rear-naked choke)	MMA Challengers 2	December 6, 2009	1	3:23	Bytom, Poland	MMA Challengers Lightweight Tournament Semifinal.
Win	5–0	Ireneusz Mila	Decision (unanimous)	MMA Challengers 2	December 6, 2009	2	4:00	Bytom, Poland	MMA Challengers Lightweight Tournament Quarterfinal.
Win	4–0	Rafał Lasota	TKO (leg injury)	Shooto Poland: Held vs. Lasota	November 21, 2009	3	N/A	Kielce, Poland	
Win	3–0	Mariusz Pioskowik	TKO (punches)	Bytomska: Gala MMA 2	May 23, 2009	2	2:49	Bytom, Poland	
Win	2–0	Artur Sowiński	Decision (majority)	MMA Challengers 1	May 3, 2009	2	5:00	Mysłowice, Poland	
Win	1–0	Mateusz Piórkowski	Submission (armbar)	Abak Moto	September 28, 2008	1	4:01	Muchowiec, Poland	Lightweight debut.

== Submission grappling record ==
Result	Marcin Najman	Method	Event	Date	Round	Time	Notes
Draw	(Lithuania) Marius Žaromskis	Draw	Quintet	April 11, 2018	1	10:00	
Win	(Lithuania) Teodoras Aukstuolis	Submission (kneebar)	Quintet	April 11, 2018	1		
Win	(Lithuania) Viktor Tomasevic	Submission (kneebar)	Quintet	April 11, 2018	1		

== See also ==
- List of current KSW fighters
- List of male mixed martial artists
