= Wiktoria Czyżewska =

Polish mixed martial artist (born 2004)

- Born: Wiktoria Czyżewska; 2 February 2004 (age 22); Końskie, Poland
- Other names: Chicatoro
- Height: 5 ft 5 in (1.65 m)
- Weight: 136 lb (62 kg; 9 st 10 lb)
- Division: Flyweight (2023–2025); Bantamweight (2022–2023, 2026–present)
- Reach: 65.7 in (167 cm)
- Fighting out of: Końskie, Poland
- Team: Dragon Starachowice (former); BRAWLER Fight Club Końskie; Cross Fight Radom
- Years active: 2022–present

Mixed martial arts record
- Total: 9
- Wins: 7
- By knockout: 5
- By submission: 0
- By decision: 2
- By disqualification: 0
- Losses: 2
- By knockout: 1
- By submission: 0
- By decision: 1
- No contests: 0

Other information
- Mixed martial arts record from Sherdog

Wiktoria Czyżewska (born 2 February 2004) is a Polish professional mixed martial artist. She currently competes in the Bantamweight division of Konfrontacja Sztuk Walki (KSW).

== Professional career ==
=== Early career ===
Czyżewska made her professional debut on October 28, 2022, against Wiktoria Domżalska. Czyżewska won the fight via a first-round TKO.

=== Konfrontacja Sztuk Walki ===
Czyżewska made her debut under Konfrontacja Sztuk Walki (KSW) on December 17, 2022, against Aleksandra Karaseva. Czyżewska won the fight via a first-round TKO.

Her next fight came on August 19, 2023, against Sandra Succar. Czyżewska lost the fight via a third-round TKO.

Her next fight came on February 17, 2024, against Petra Částková. Czyżewska won the fight via a first-round knockout. This performance earned her her first Knockout of the Night bonus.

Her next fight came on August 24, 2024, against Erianny Castaneda. Czyżewska won the fight via a first-round knockout. This performance earned her her second career Knockout of the Night bonus.

Her next fight came on January 25, 2025, against Adrianna Kreft. Czyżewska won the fight via a Unanimous Decision.

For her next fight, she was scheduled to face former Ultimate Fighting Championship (UFC) fighter Tamires Vidal on July 19, 2025. Vidal later withdrew from the bout a week before the event due to suffering a knee injury, and was replaced by compatriot Bianca Sattelmayer. Czyżewska won the fight via a Unanimous Decision. This performance earned her her first Fight of the Night bonus.

Her next fight came on January 17, 2026, against formerly scheduled opponent Tamires Vidal. Czyżewska won the fight via a first-round TKO. This performance earned her her third Knockout of the Night bonus.

Czyżewska faced Sara Luzar-Smajić on May 16, 2026, for the inaugural KSW Women's Bantamweight Championship. Czyżewska lost the fight via a Unanimous Decision, failing to win the championship. Despite the loss, this performance earned her her second career Fight of the Night bonus.

== Championships and accomplishments ==
=== Mixed martial arts ===
- Konfrontacja Sztuk Walki
  - Knockout of the Night (Three times)
  - Fight of the Night (Two times)

== Mixed martial arts record ==
Professional record breakdown
| 10 matches | 8 wins | 2 losses |
| By knockout | 5 | 1 |
| By submission | 1 | 0 |
| By decision | 2 | 1 |

| Res. | Record | Opponent | Method | Event | Date | Round | Time | Location | Notes |
|---|---|---|---|---|---|---|---|---|---|
| Loss | 7–2 | Sara Luzar-Smajić | Decision (unanimous) | KSW 118 | May 16, 2026 | 5 | 5:00 | Kalisz, Poland | For the inaugural KSW Women's Bantamweight Championship. Fight of the Night. |
| Win | 7–1 | Tamires Vidal | TKO (body kick and punches) | KSW 114 | January 17, 2026 | 1 | 4:10 | Radom, Poland | Return to Bantamweight. Knockout of the Night. |
| Win | 6–1 | Bianca Sattelmayer | Decision (unanimous) | KSW 108 | July 19, 2025 | 3 | 5:00 | Olsztyn, Poland | Fight of the Night. |
| Win | 5–1 | Adrianna Kreft | Decision (unanimous) | KSW 102 | January 25, 2025 | 3 | 5:00 | Radom, Poland | |
| Win | 4–1 | Erianny Castaneda | KO (head kick) | KSW 97 | August 24, 2024 | 1 | 2:09 | Tarnów, Poland | Knockout of the Night. |
| Win | 3–1 | Petra Častkova | KO (body kick) | KSW 91 | February 17, 2024 | 1 | 1:56 | Liberec, Czech Republic | Knockout of the Night. |
| Loss | 2–1 | Sandra Succar | TKO (punches) | KSW 85 | August 19, 2023 | 3 | 2:34 | Nowy Sącz, Poland | Flyweight debut; Succar missed weight (127.2 lb). |
| Win | 2–0 | Aleksandra Karaseva | TKO (punches) | KSW 77 | December 17, 2022 | 1 | 1:12 | Gliwice, Poland | Bantamweight debut. |
| Win | 1–0 | Wiktoria Domżalska | TKO (punches) | Thunderstrike Fight League 25 | October 28, 2022 | 1 | 0:21 | Włodawa, Poland | Catchweight (129 lb) bout. |

== See also ==
- List of female mixed martial artists
- List of current Konfrontacja Sztuk Walki fighters
