= 2026 in Konfrontacja Sztuk Walki =

Mixed martial arts events

Information
- First date: January 17, 2026

Events

Fights

Chronology
2025 in KSW	2026 in Konfrontacja Sztuk Walki	2027 in KSW

The year 2026 will be the 22nd year in the history of the Konfrontacja Sztuk Walki, a mixed martial arts promotion based in Poland.

== List of events ==
#	Event Title	Date	Venue	Location
1	XTB KSW 114: Parnasse vs. Held	Jan 17, 2026	Radomskie Centrum Sportu	Radom, Poland
2	XTB KSW 115: Przybysz vs. Yakymenko	Feb 21, 2026	RCS Lubin	Lubin, Poland
3	XTB KSW 116: Bartosiński vs. Fleminas	Mar 14, 2026	Arena Gorzów	Gorzów Wielkopolski, Poland
4	XTB KSW 117: Pawlak vs. Khalidov	Apr 18, 2026	Arena COS Torwar	Warsaw, Poland
5	XTB KSW 118: Kuberski vs. Michalski	May 16, 2026	Kalisz Arena	Kalisz, Poland
6	XTB KSW 119: Kaczmarczyk vs. Brichta	Jun 20, 2026	Radomskie Centrum Sportu	Radom, Poland
7	XTB KSW 120: Haratyk vs. Leśko 2	Jul 18, 2026	Polsat Plus Arena	Gdynia, Poland
8	XTB KSW 121: Vojčák vs. Wójcik	Sep 19, 2026	Home Credit Arena	Liberec, Czech Republic
9	XTB KSW 122: Yakymenko vs. Morelli	Oct 10, 2026	Hala Podpromie	Rzeszów, Poland
10	XTB KSW 123: Mircea vs. Held	Nov 21, 2026	Enea Arena	Szczecin, Poland
11	XTB KSW 124: Pawlak vs. Kuberski	Dec 19, 2026	Gliwice Arena	Gliwice, Poland

== Title fights ==
Title fights in 2026
Weight class				Method	Round	Time	Event	Notes
Lightweight	Salahdine Parnasse (c)	def.	Marcin Held	TKO (punches)	2	3:35	KSW 114	(Note: For the KSW Lightweight Championship.)
Bantamweight	Vitalii Yakymenko	def.	Sebastian Przybysz (c)	Decision (split) (49–46, 47–48, 49–46)	5	5:00	KSW 115	(Note: For the KSW Bantamweight Championship.)
Welterweight	Adrian Bartosiński (c)	def.	Madars Fleminas	Decision (split) (48–47, 45–50, 48–47)	5	5:00	KSW 116	(Note: For the KSW Welterweight Championship.)
Heavyweight	Phil De Fries (c)	def.	Marcin Wójcik	Submission (rear-naked choke)	1	4:08	KSW 117	(Note: For the KSW Heavyweight Championship.)
Middleweight	Paweł Pawlak (c)	def.	Mamed Khalidov	TKO (elbows)	4	4:59	KSW 117	(Note: For the KSW Middleweight Championship.)
Women's Bantamweight	Sara Luzar-Smajić	def.	Wiktoria Czyżewska	Decision (unanimous) (49–46, 49–46, 48–47)	5	5:00	KSW 118	(Note: For the inaugural KSW Women's Bantamweight Championship.)
Middleweight	Piotr Kuberski (ic)	def.	Michał Michalski	TKO (punches)	1	2:09	KSW 118	(Note: For the interim KSW Middleweight Championship.)
Featherweight	Patryk Kaczmarczyk (c)	def.	Leo Brichta	Submission (arm-triangle choke)	3	4:22	KSW 119	(Note: For the KSW Featherweight Championship.)
Light Heavyweight	Bartosz Leśko	def.	Rafał Haratyk (c)	Decision (unanimous) (48–47, 49–46, 48–47)	5	5:00	KSW 120	(Note: For the KSW Light Heavyweight Championship.)
Heavyweight	Štefan Vojčák	def.	Marcin Wójcik	TKO (head kick and punches)	4	2:36	KSW 121	(Note: For the interim KSW Heavyweight Championship.)
Bantamweight	Vitalii Yakymenko (c)	def.	Marcelo Morelli	Submission (kneebar)	5	1:09	KSW 122	(Note: For the KSW Bantamweight Championship.)
Welterweight	Adrian Bartosiński (c)	vs.	Tymoteusz Łopaczyk				KSW 123	(Note: For the KSW Welterweight Championship.)
Lightweight	Valeriu Mircea	vs.	Marcin Held				KSW 123	(Note: For the vacant KSW Lightweight Championship.)
Middleweight	Paweł Pawlak (c)	vs.	Piotr Kuberski (ic)				KSW 124	(Note: For the vacant KSW Middleweight Championship.)
Heavyweight	Štefan Vojčák (ic)	vs.	Artur Szpilka				KSW 124	(Note: For the interim KSW Heavyweight Championship.)

== XTB KSW 114: Parnasse vs. Held ==
XTB KSW 114: Parnasse vs. Held
- Promotion: Konfrontacja Sztuk Walki
- Date: January 17, 2026
- Venue: Radom Sports Center
- City: Radom, Poland

XTB KSW 114: Parnasse vs. Held was a mixed martial arts event held by Konfrontacja Sztuk Walki on January 17, 2026, at the Radom Sports Center in Radom, Poland.

=== Background ===
The event marked the promotion's fourth visit to Radom and first since KSW 102 in January 2025.

The main event featured a KSW Lightweight Championship bout between current champion (also a current two-time KSW Featherweight Champion) Salahdine Parnasse and Marcin Held. The bout was originally scheduled to headline at KSW 106 in May 2025, but Held withdrew from the event due to a rib injury.

Albert Odzimkowski was slated to make his promotional return on this event, but before his opponent was announced, he was forced to withdraw due to an injury.

A light heavyweight bout between former KSW Light Heavyweight Champion Ibragim Chuzhigaev and Sergiusz Zając was scheduled for this event. However, Zając withdrew from the bout due to health reasons and was replaced by Maciej Różański.

=== Bonus awards ===
The following fighters were awarded bonuses:

- Performance of the Night: Salahdine Parnasse
- Knockout of the Night: Arkadiusz Wrzosek, Wiktoria Czyżewska and Andi Vrtačić

=== Results ===
Main card (Canal+ / KSWTV)
Weight class				Method	Round	Time	Notes
Lightweight	Salahdine Parnasse (c)	def.	Marcin Held	TKO (punches)	2	3:35	(Note: For the KSW Lightweight Championship.)
Heavyweight	Arkadiusz Wrzosek	def.	Szymon Bajor	KO (knee)	2	0:40
Women's Bantamweight	Wiktoria Czyżewska	def.	Tamires Vidal	TKO (body kick and punches)	1	4:10
Catchweight (212 lb)	Ibragim Chuzhigaev	vs.	Maciej Różański	NC (accidental eye poke)	2	1:35	(Note: Accidental eye poke rendered Różański unable to continue.)
Featherweight	Piotr Kacprzak	def.	Wojciech Kazieczko	Decision (majority) (28–28, 29–28, 29–28)	3	5:00
Middleweight	Andi Vrtačić	def.	Mateusz Gola	KO (head kick)	2	2:39
Welterweight	Amaury Wako-Zabo	def.	Viktor Červinský	Decision (unanimous) (30–27, 30–27, 30–27)	3	5:00
Preliminary card (YouTube)
Middleweight	Konrad Rusiński	def.	Henry Fadipe	Decision (unanimous) (29–28, 30–26, 30–27)	3	5:00
Lightweight	Iras Khizriev	def.	Oleksandr Moisa	Decision (unanimous) (29–28, 29–28, 30–27)	3	5:00

== XTB KSW 115: Przybysz vs. Yakymenko ==
XTB KSW 115: Przybysz vs. Yakymenko
- Promotion: Konfrontacja Sztuk Walki
- Date: February 21, 2026
- Venue: RCS Lubin
- City: Lubin, Poland

XTB KSW 115: Przybysz vs. Yakymenko was a mixed martial arts event held by Konfrontacja Sztuk Walki on February 21, 2026, at the RCS Lubin in Lubin, Poland.

=== Background ===
The event marked the promotion's third visit to Lubin and first since KSW 98 in September 2024.

A KSW Bantamweight Championship bout between current two-time champion Sebastian Przybysz and Vitalii Yakymenko headlined the event.

Daniel Skibiński was originally scheduled to face Tymoteusz Łopaczyk in a welterweight bout at this event. However, Łopaczyk withdrew from the fight due to a rib injury and was replaced by undefeated prospect Dawid Kuczmarski.

Dawid Kasperski and Jordan Nandor were scheduled to meet in a light heavyweight bout. However, Kasperski had to withdraw from the bout due to a knee injury and was replaced by Kacper Sochacki.

In addition, a middleweight bout between Borys Dzikowski and Adrian Dudek was also scheduled for this event. However, Dudek withdrew due to an injury and was replaced by Kacper Pakeltys.

=== Bonus awards ===
The following fighters were awarded bonuses:

- Fight of the Night: Mariusz Joniak vs. Karol Durszlewicz
- Submission of the Night: Kristians Boguzs and Kacper Sochacki

=== Results ===
Main card (Canal+ / KSWTV)
Weight class				Method	Round	Time	Notes
Bantamweight	Vitalii Yakymenko	def.	Sebastian Przybysz (c)	Decision (split) (49–46, 47–48, 49–46)	5	5:00	(Note: For the KSW Bantamweight Championship.)
Welterweight	Kacper Koziorzębski	def.	Artur Szczepaniak	Decision (majority) (28–28, 29–27, 29–27)	3	5:00	(Note: Szczepaniak deducted one point in round 3 for repeated low blows.)
Featherweight	Łukasz Charzewski	def.	Alioune Nahaye	Decision (unanimous) (29–28, 29–28, 29–28)	3	5:00
Welterweight	Dawid Kuczmarski	def.	Daniel Skibiński	Decision (unanimous) (30–27, 30–27, 30–27)	3	5:00
Featherweight	Josef Štummer	def.	Michał Domin	Decision (unanimous) (29–27, 29–27, 29–27)	3	5:00	(Note: Štummer deducted one point before the fight due to missing weight (148 lb).)
Middleweight	Kacper Pakeltys	def.	Borys Dzikowski	Decision (unanimous) (29–28, 30–26, 30–27)	3	5:00
Bantamweight	Mariusz Joniak	def.	Karol Durszlewicz	Decision (unanimous) (29–27, 29–28, 30–26)	3	5:00
Preliminary card (YouTube)
Light Heavyweight	Kacper Sochacki	def.	Jordan Nandor	Submission (rear-naked choke)	1	4:10
Lightweight	Kristians Boguzs	def.	Kacper Fornalski	Submission (rear-naked choke)	2	2:27

== XTB KSW 116: Bartosiński vs. Fleminas ==
XTB KSW 116: Bartosiński vs. Fleminas
- Promotion: Konfrontacja Sztuk Walki
- Date: March 14, 2026
- Venue: Arena Gorzów
- City: Gorzów Wielkopolski, Poland

XTB KSW 116: Bartosiński vs. Fleminas was a mixed martial arts event held by Konfrontacja Sztuk Walki on March 14, 2026, at the Arena Gorzów in Gorzów Wielkopolski, Poland.

=== Background ===
The event marked the promotion's third visit to Gorzów Wielkopolski and first since KSW 104 in March 2025.

A KSW Heavyweight Championship bout between current champion Phil De Fries and opponent to-be-announced was initially scheduled to headline this event. However on February 5, it was announced that the fight has been moved to the April event instead.

A KSW Welterweight Championship bout between current champion Adrian Bartosiński and Madars Fleminas headlined the event.

=== Bonus awards ===
The following fighters were awarded bonuses:

- Fight of the Night: Damian Piwowarczyk vs. Sergiusz Zając
- Submission of the Night: Eva Dourthe
- Knockout of the Night: Damian Piwowarczyk

=== Results ===
Main card (Canal+ / KSWTV)
Weight class				Method	Round	Time	Notes
Welterweight	Adrian Bartosiński (c)	def.	Madars Fleminas	Decision (split) (48–47, 45–50, 48–47)	5	5:00	(Note: For the KSW Welterweight Championship.)
Light Heavyweight	Damian Piwowarczyk	def.	Sergiusz Zając	TKO (punches)	2	1:22
Middleweight	Bartosz Kurek	def.	Tomasz Romanowski	Decision (unanimous) (30–27, 30–27, 30–27)	3	5:00
Light Heavyweight	Bartosz Leśko	def.	Bartosz Szewczyk	Decision (unanimous) (30–26, 30–25, 30–26)	3	5:00
Women's Strawweight	Eva Dourthe	def.	Ewelina Woźniak	Submission (armbar)	2	4:18
Lightweight	Kacper Formela	def.	Krzysztof Mendlewski	Decision (unanimous) (30–27, 30–27, 30–27)	3	5:00
Lightweight	Oleksandr Moisa	def.	Wojciech Kawa	TKO (arm injury)	1	2:44
Preliminary card (YouTube)
Middleweight	Damian Mieczkowski	def.	Maksymilian Kowalski	TKO (punches)	3	1:58
Bantamweight	Andrzej Karkula	def.	Dominik Mazur	Submission (rear-naked choke)	1	4:31	(Note: Mazur was deducted one point before the fight due to him missing weight (139 lb).)

== XTB KSW 117: Pawlak vs. Khalidov ==
XTB KSW 117: Pawlak vs. Khalidov
- Promotion: Konfrontacja Sztuk Walki
- Date: April 18, 2026
- Venue: Arena COS Torwar
- City: Warsaw, Poland

XTB KSW 117: Pawlak vs. Khalidov was a mixed martial arts event held by Konfrontacja Sztuk Walki on April 18, 2026, at the Arena COS Torwar in Warsaw, Poland.

=== Background ===
The event was headlined by a KSW Middleweight Championship bout between current champion Paweł Pawlak and former two-time champion (also former KSW Light Heavyweight Champion) Mamed Khalidov.

A KSW Heavyweight Championship bout between current champion Phil De Fries and Marcin Wójcik served as the co-main event.

A heavyweight bout between Štefan Vojčák and Arkadiusz Wrzosek was scheduled at the event. However, Wrzosek withdrew from the fight due to a rib injury, so the bout was canceled.

=== Bonus awards ===
The following fighters were awarded bonuses:

- Fight of the Night: Tobiasz Le vs. Sebastian Decowski
- Submission of the Night: Phil De Fries
- Knockout of the Night: Luka Vrtačić

=== Results ===
Main card (Canal+ / KSWTV)
Weight class				Method	Round	Time	Notes
Middleweight	Paweł Pawlak (c)	def.	Mamed Khalidov	TKO (elbows)	4	4:59	(Note: For the KSW Middleweight Championship.)
Heavyweight	Phil De Fries (c)	def.	Marcin Wójcik	Submission (rear-naked choke)	1	4:08	(Note: For the KSW Heavyweight Championship.)
Featherweight	Daniel Rutkowski	def.	Oleksii Polishchuk	Decision (unanimous) (30–27, 30–27, 30–27)	3	5:00
Middleweight	Andi Vrtačić	def.	Albert Odzimkowski	TKO (punches and elbows)	1	4:54
Bantamweight	Marcello Morelli	def.	Werlleson Martins	Decision (unanimous) (30–27, 30–27, 30–26)	3	5:00
Lightweight	Hugo Deux	def.	Welisson Paiva	TKO (elbows)	2	4:59
Middleweight	Luka Vrtačić	def.	Jacek Gać	TKO (knee and punches)	1	0:45
Preliminary card (YouTube)
Bantamweight	Tobiasz Le	def.	Sebastian Decowski	Decision (unanimous) (30–27, 30–27, 30–26)	3	5:00
Featherweight	Nacim Belhouachi	def.	Jan Mašek	Decision (unanimous) (30–27, 30–27, 30–27)	3	5:00

== XTB KSW 118: Kuberski vs. Michalski ==
XTB KSW 118: Kuberski vs. Michalski
- Promotion: Konfrontacja Sztuk Walki
- Date: May 16, 2026
- Venue: Kalisz Arena
- City: Kalisz, Poland

XTB KSW 118: Kuberski vs. Michalski was a mixed martial arts event held by Konfrontacja Sztuk Walki on May 16, 2026, at the Kalisz Arena in Kalisz, Poland.

=== Background ===
The event marked the promotion's first visit to Kalisz, which was the third city to hold in Greater Poland Voivodeship.

An interim KSW Middleweight Championship bout between current interim champion Piotr Kuberski and Michał Michalski headlined the event.

An inaugural KSW Women's Bantamweight Championship bout between Wiktoria Czyżewska and Sara Luzar-Smajić took place at the event.

A welterweight bout between Artur Szczepaniak and undefeated prospect Adam Masaev was scheduled for this event. However, Szczepaniak withdrew from the bout due to a shoulder injury and was replaced by undefeated promotional newcomer Michał Hir. In turn, Masaev withdrew due to health issues and was replaced by Mateusz Wieczorek.

Oskar Szczepaniak, who is younger brother of Artur, withdrew from the event against Steven Krt due to a knee injury and was replaced by promotional newcomer Daniel Kolasiński.

=== Bonus awards ===
The following fighters were awarded bonuses:

- Fight of the Night: Sara Luzar-Smajić vs. Wiktoria Czyżewska
- Knockout of the Night: Valeriu Mircea and Piotr Kuberski

=== Results ===
Main card (Canal+ / KSWTV)
Weight class				Method	Round	Time	Notes
Middleweight	Piotr Kuberski (ic)	def.	Michał Michalski	TKO (punches)	1	2:09	(Note: For the interim KSW Middleweight Championship.)
Women's Bantamweight	Sara Luzar-Smajić	def.	Wiktoria Czyżewska	Decision (unanimous) (49–46, 49–46, 48–47)	5	5:00	(Note: For the inaugural KSW Women's Bantamweight Championship.)
Lightweight	Valeriu Mircea	def.	Roman Szymański	TKO (punches)	2	0:52
Lightweight	Marian Ziółkowski	def.	Aymard Guih	TKO (punches)	2	4:36	(Note: Guih missed weight (160 lb).)
Light Heavyweight	Aleksander Winiarski	def.	Dawid Kasperski	Decision (unanimous) (30–27, 30–27, 30–27)	3	5:00
Welterweight	Konrad Rusiński	def.	Tagir Machmudov	TKO (punches)	1	2:45
Light Heavyweight	Michał Dreczkowski	def.	Cedric Lushima	Decision (unanimous) (30–27, 30–27, 30–27)	3	5:00
Preliminary card (YouTube)
Welterweight	Steven Krt	def.	Daniel Kolasiński	TKO (punches and elbows)	2	2:40
Catchweight (179 lb)	Mateusz Wieczorek	def.	Michał Hir	Decision (unanimous) (30–27, 30–27, 30–27)	3	5:00

== XTB KSW 119: Kaczmarczyk vs. Brichta ==
XTB KSW 119: Kaczmarczyk vs. Brichta
- Promotion: Konfrontacja Sztuk Walki
- Date: June 20, 2026
- Venue: Radomskie Centrum Sportu
- City: Radom, Poland

XTB KSW 119: Kaczmarczyk vs. Brichta was a mixed martial arts event held by Konfrontacja Sztuk Walki on June 20, 2026, at the Radomskie Centrum Sportu in Radom, Poland.

=== Background ===
The event marked the promotion's fifth visit to Radom and first since KSW 114 in January 2026.

A KSW Featherweight Championship bout between current champion Patryk Kaczmarczyk and Leo Brichta headlined this event. The bout was originally scheduled to meet at KSW 108 in July 2025, but Kaczmarczyk withdrew due to a leg injury.

A lightweight bout between Piotr Kacprzak and undefeated prospect Igor Włodarczyk was scheduled for this event. However, Włodarczyk pulled out due to an injury and was replaced by promotional newcomer Slimen Hassaini.

A featherweight rematch between Adam Soldaev and Daniel Rutkowski was scheduled at this event. The pairing previously fought at KSW 83 in June 2023, which Rutkowski won by unanimous decision. However, Soldaev withdrew from the bout due to a rib injury and was replaced by Danu Tărchilă.

Jordan Nandor and Piotr Chudzik were scheduled to meet in a light heavyweight bout at this event, but Nandor withdrew due to injury and was replaced by Predrag Božović.

=== Bonus awards ===
The following fighters were awarded bonuses:

- Fight of the Night: Tymoteusz Łopaczyk vs. Andrzej Grzebyk
- Submission of the Night: Adam Masaev
- Knockout of the Night: Souheil Kaouchen

=== Results ===
Main card (Canal+ / KSWTV)
Weight class				Method	Round	Time	Notes
Featherweight	Patryk Kaczmarczyk (c)	def.	Leo Brichta	Submission (arm-triangle choke)	3	4:22	(Note: For the KSW Featherweight Championship.)
Heavyweight	Štefan Vojčák	def.	Arkadiusz Wrzosek	Submission (smother choke)	2	1:25
Catchweight (150 lb)	Daniel Rutkowski	def.	Daniel Tărchilă	Decision (unanimous) (29–28, 29–28, 30–27)	3	5:00
Catchweight (176 lb)	Tymoteusz Łopaczyk	def.	Andrzej Grzebyk	Submission (guillotine choke)	3	3:11
Middleweight	Damian Janikowski	def.	Wiktor Zalewski	Submission (scarf hold)	1	2:20
Welterweight	Adam Masaev	def.	Konrad Rusiński	Submission (armbar)	1	1:34
Featherweight	Souheil Kaouchen	def.	Kacper Wróbel	TKO (elbows and punches)	2	3:35
Heavyweight	Michal Martínek	def.	Marek Samociuk	Decision (unanimous) (29–28, 29–28, 30–27)	3	5:00
Preliminary card (YouTube)
Lightweight	Piotr Kacprzak	def.	Slimen Hassaini	Decision (unanimous) (29–27, 29–27, 29–27)	3	5:00	(Note: Kacprzak missed weight (159 lb).)
Light Heavyweight	Piotr Chudzik	def.	Predrag Božović	Submission (rear-naked choke)	2	1:59

== XTB KSW 120: Haratyk vs. Leśko 2 ==
XTB KSW 120: Haratyk vs. Leśko 2
- Promotion: Konfrontacja Sztuk Walki
- Date: July 18, 2026
- Venue: Polsat Plus Arena
- City: Gdynia, Poland

XTB KSW 120: Haratyk vs. Leśko 2 was a mixed martial arts event held by Konfrontacja Sztuk Walki on July 18, 2026, at the Polsat Plus Arena in Gdynia, Poland.

=== Background ===
The event marked the promotion's second visit to Gdynia and first since KSW 84 in July 2023. This was celebration of the city's 100th anniversary.

A KSW Light Heavyweight Championship rematch between current champion Rafał Haratyk and Bartosz Leśko headlined this event. The pairing previously met at KSW 111 in October 2025, which Haratyk defended the title by unanimous decision.

A featherweight bout between Oskar Stachura and Grzegorz Kowalski was scheduled at this event. However, Kowalski withdrew from his bout due to an injury and was replaced by Mateusz Balko.

A bantamweight bout between former two-time KSW Bantamweight Champion Sebastian Przybysz and Rogério Bontorin was scheduled at this event. However, Bontorin withdrew from the bout due to injury and was replaced by promotional newcomer Edgars Skrīvers.

Laïd Zerhouni and Bartosz Kurek were scheduled to compete at the event. However, the bout was cancelled in late minute after Zerhouni withdrew due to health issues.

=== Bonus awards ===
The following fighters were awarded bonuses:

- Fight of the Night: Bartosz Leśko vs. Rafał Haratyk
- Submission of the Night: Rayla Nascimento
- Knockout of the Night: Maciej Różański

=== Results ===
Main card (Canal+ / KSWTV)
Weight class				Method	Round	Time	Notes
Light Heavyweight	Bartosz Leśko	def.	Rafał Haratyk (c)	Decision (unanimous) (48–47, 49–46, 48–47)	5	5:00	(Note: For the KSW Light Heavyweight Championship.)
Heavyweight	Artur Szpilka	def.	Augusto Sakai	Decision (unanimous) (29–28, 29–28, 29–27)	3	5:00
Bantamweight	Sebastian Przybysz	def.	Edgars Skrīvers	Decision (unanimous) (30–27, 30–27, 30–27)	3	5:00
Welterweight	Adam Niedźwiedź	def.	Mateusz Pawlik	Decision (unanimous) (30–27, 30–27, 30–27)	3	5:00
Women's Flyweight	Rayla Nascimento	def.	Laura Grzyb	Submission (rear-naked choke)	2	4:42
Light Heavyweight	Maciej Różański	def.	Ibragim Chuzhigaev	TKO (punches)	2	3:59
Preliminary card (YouTube)
Bantamweight	Przemysław Górny	def.	Grzegorz Stabach	Decision (unanimous) (30–27, 30–27, 30–27)	3	5:00
Featherweight	Oskar Stachura	def.	Mateusz Balko	Decision (unanimous) (29–28, 29–28, 29–28)	3	5:00

== XTB KSW 121: Vojčák vs. Wójcik ==
XTB KSW 121: Vojčák vs. Wójcik
- Promotion: Konfrontacja Sztuk Walki
- Date: September 19, 2026
- Venue: Home Credit Arena
- City: Liberec, Czech Republic

XTB KSW 121: Vojčák vs. Wójcik was a mixed martial arts event held by Konfrontacja Sztuk Walki on September 19, 2026, at the Home Credit Arena in Liberec, Czech Republic.

=== Background ===
The event marked the promotion's fourth visit to Liberec and first since KSW 103 in February 2025.

A KSW Heavyweight Championship rematch between current champion Phil De Fries and Štefan Vojčák was scheduled to headline the event. The pairing previously fought at KSW 111 in October 2025, which De Fries defended his title by third round TKO. However, De Fries withdrew from the bout due to a cervical spine injury and was replaced by Marcin Wójcik for the interim title.

A welterweight bout between Tagir Machmudov and Djibril Nsenga was scheduled at the event, but Nsenga withdrew from the bout due to an injury and was replaced by Szymon Kasprzyński. In turn, the bout was removed from the event due to health issues with Machmudov.

=== Bonus awards ===
The following fighters were awarded bonuses.

- Fight of the Night: Małgorzata Popowicz vs. Hanka Gelnarová
- Knockout of the Night: Štefan Vojčák
- Submission of the Night: Michał Michalski

=== Results ===
Main card (Canal+ / KSWTV)
Weight class				Method	Round	Time	Notes
Heavyweight	Štefan Vojčák	def.	Marcin Wójcik	TKO (head kick and punches)	4	2:36	(Note: For the interim KSW Heavyweight Championship.)
Middleweight	Michał Michalski	def.	Radosław Paczuski	Submission (rear-naked choke)	1	4:15
Lightweight	Kacper Formela	def.	Leo Brichta	Decision (majority) (30–27, 29–28, 28–28)	3	5:00
Welterweight	Muslim Tulshaev	vs.	Kacper Koziorzębski	NC (accidental groin kick)	1	4:54	(Note: Accidental groin kick rendered Tulshaev unable to continue.)
Featherweight	Josef Štummer	def.	Łukasz Charzewski	Decision (split) (30–27, 28–29, 29–28)	3	5:00
Women’s Bantamweight	Małgorzata Popowicz	def.	Hanka Gelnarová	Submission (armbar)	3	1:50
Preliminary card (YouTube)
Middleweight	Borys Dzikowski	def.	Adrian Dudek	TKO (doctor stoppage)	2	5:00
Welterweight	Dominik Zadora	def.	Samuel Bílý	Decision (unanimous) (30–27, 30–27, 30–27)	3	5:00

== XTB KSW 122: Yakymenko vs. Morelli ==
XTB KSW 122: Yakymenko vs. Morelli
- Promotion: Konfrontacja Sztuk Walki
- Date: October 10, 2026
- Venue: Hala Podpromie
- City: Rzeszów, Poland

XTB KSW 122: Yakymenko vs. Morelli was a mixed martial arts event held by Konfrontacja Sztuk Walki on October 10, 2026, at Hala Podpromie in Rzeszów, Poland.

=== Background ===
The event marked the promotion's second visit to Rzeszów and first since KSW 110 in September 2025.

A KSW Welterweight Championship bout between current champion Adrian Bartosiński and undefeated prospect Adam Masaev was originally scheduled to headline the event. However, Masaev withdrew from the bout due to a hand injury and Bartosiński was then rebooked one month later at KSW 123.

A KSW Bantamweight Championship bout between current champion Vitalii Yakymenko and Marcelo Morelli was scheduled to take place at co-main event. After the original headliner was cancelled, the bout was promoted to new main event status.

A bantamweight bout between Andrzej Karkula and Sebastian Decowski was scheduled at this event, but Decowski withdrew due to an injury and was replaced by Kamil Korzeniowski.

A light heavyweight bout between Sergiusz Zając and Bartosz Szewczyk was scheduled at the event. However, Szewczyk withdrew from the bout due to an injury and was replaced by Salim El Ouassaidi.

At the weigh-ins, three fighters missed weight:

- Laïd Zerhouni weighed in at 188 pounds, two pounds over the middleweight limit.
- Adam Soldaev weighed in at 158 pounds, two pounds over the lightweight limit.
- Zając weighed in at 215 pounds, five pounds over the 210-pounds catchweight contest.

All bouts proceeded at catchweight. The fighters were fined a percentage of their individual purses which went to their opponents Andrzej Grzebyk (40 percent), Mateusz Makarowski (30 percent) and El Ouassaidi (50 percent) respectively, also received a one-point deduction at the start of the fight.

=== Bonus awards ===
The following fighters were awarded bonuses.

- Fight of the Night: Vitalii Yakymenko vs. Marcelo Morelli
- Knockout of the Night: Adam Soldaev
- Submission of the Night: Wilson Varela

=== Results ===
Main card (Canal+ / KSWTV)
Weight class				Method	Round	Time	Notes
Bantamweight	Vitalii Yakymenko (c)	def.	Marcelo Morelli	Submission (kneebar)	5	1:09	(Note: For the KSW Bantamweight Championship.)
Middleweight	Andrzej Grzebyk	def.	Laïd Zerhouni	Decision (majority) (29–27, 29–27, 28–28)	3	5:00	(Note: Zerhouni missed weight (188 lb).)
Lightweight	Adam Soldaev	def.	Mateusz Makarowski	KO (punches)	1	4:17	(Note: Soldaev missed weight (158 lb).)
Lightweight	Wilson Varela	def.	Marian Ziółkowski	Submission (armbar)	1	3:40
Lightweight	Igor Włodarczyk	def.	Welisson Paiva	Decision (unanimous) (30–25, 30–27, 30–26)	3	5:00
Heavyweight	Szymon Bajor	def.	Kacper Paczóski	Decision (unanimous) (30–27, 29–28, 29–28)	3	5:00
Bantamweight	Andrzej Karkula	def.	Kamil Korzeniowski	Decision (unanimous) (30–27, 30–27, 30–27)	3	5:00
Preliminary card (YouTube)
Lightweight	Kristians Boguzs	def.	Kacper Cholewa	TKO (punches)	3	1:36
Catchweight (210 lb)	Sergiusz Zając	def.	Salim El Ouassaidi	KO (elbows and punches)	1	1:09	(Note: Zając missed weight (215 lb).)

== XTB KSW 123: Mircea vs. Held ==
XTB KSW 123: Mircea vs. Held
- Promotion: Konfrontacja Sztuk Walki
- Date: November 21, 2026
- Venue: Enea Arena
- City: Szczecin, Poland

XTB KSW 123: Mircea vs. Held was a mixed martial arts event that was held by Konfrontacja Sztuk Walki on November 21, 2026, at Enea Arena in Szczecin, Poland.

=== Background ===
The event marked the promotion's fifth visit to Szczecin and first since KSW 112 in November 2025.

A KSW Welterweight Championship bout between the reigning champion Adrian Bartosiński and Tymoteusz Łopaczyk was scheduled to headline the event. However, Bartosiński withdrew from the event due to an injury, so the bout was removed from the event.

A KSW Lightweight Championship bout for the vacant title between former interim champion Valeriu Mircea and Marcin Held was scheduled to serve as the co-main event. After the original headliner was cancelled, the bout served as the event's official headliner.

A welterweight bout between Oskar Szczepaniak and Steven Krt was scheduled at the event, but Krt pulled out due to an injury and was replaced by Michał Hir in a 174 pounds catchweight bout. In turn, Hir pulled out for unknown reasons and was replaced by Arbi Dzhambulatov.

In addition, a middleweight bout between Tomasz Romanowski and Igor Michaliszyn was removed from the event for unknown reasons.

At the weigh-ins, Kamil Szkaradek weighed in at 138 pounds, two pounds over the bantamweight limit. The bout proceeded at catchweight. Szkaradek was deducted one-point at the start of the fight and was fined 30 percent of his purse, which went to Rogério Bontorin.

=== Results ===
Main card (Canal+ / KSWTV)
Weight class				Method	Round	Time	Notes
Lightweight	Marcin Held	def.	Valeriu Mircea	Decision (unanimous) (49–46, 48–47, 48–47)	5	5:00	(Note: For the vacant KSW Lightweight Championship.)
Welterweight	Marian Ziółkowski	def.	Roman Szymański	TKO (flying knee and punches)	1	3:31
Welterweight	Madars Fleminas	def.	Mateusz Pawlik	Decision (unanimous) (29–28, 29–28, 30–27)	3	5:00
Bantamweight	Kamil Szkaradek	def.	Rogério Bontorin	Submission (kneebar)	1	2:33	(Note: Szkaradek missed weight (138 lb), and was deducted one point in round 1 due to missing the weight.)
Lightweight	Oleksandr Moisa	def.	Wojciech Kawa	TKO (punches)	2	2:55
Catchweight (176 lb)	Oskar Szczepaniak	def.	Arbi Dzhambulatov	Technical Submission (arm-triangle choke)	1	3:07
Featherweight	Dominik Dymiński	def.	Przemysław Górny	Submission (ankle lock)	1	2:01
Preliminary card (YouTube)
Lightweight	Maciej Kazieczko	def.	Bohdan Danylko	Decision (unanimous) (30–27, 30–27, 30–26)	3	5:00
Middleweight	Alain Van De Merckt	def.	Szymon Herrmann	Technical Submission (arm-triangle choke)	2	3:17

== XTB KSW 124: Pawlak vs. Kuberski ==
XTB KSW 124: Pawlak vs. Kuberski
- Promotion: Konfrontacja Sztuk Walki
- Date: December 19, 2026
- Venue: Gliwice Arena
- City: Gliwice, Poland

XTB KSW 124: Pawlak vs. Kuberski is an upcoming mixed martial arts event will held by Konfrontacja Sztuk Walki on December 19, 2026, at Gliwice Arena in Gliwice, Poland.

=== Background ===
The event will mark the promotion's 10th visit to Gliwice and first since KSW 105 in April 2025.

A KSW Middleweight Championship title unification bout between the reigning champion Paweł Pawlak and current interim champion Piotr Kuberski is scheduled to headline the event.

A KSW Featherweight Championship bout between current champion Patryk Kaczmarczyk and Josef Štummer is scheduled to serve as the co-main event.

An interim KSW Heavyweight Championship bout between current interim champion Štefan Vojčák and Artur Szpilka is scheduled to complete the triad of title fights.

=== Fight card ===
Main card (Canal+ / KSWTV)
Weight class				Method	Round	Time	Notes
Middleweight	Paweł Pawlak (c)	vs.	Piotr Kuberski (ic)				(Note: For the KSW Middleweight Championship.)
Featherweight	Patryk Kaczmarczyk (c)	vs.	Josef Štummer				(Note: For the KSW Featherweight Championship.)
Heavyweight	Štefan Vojčák (ic)	vs.	Artur Szpilka				(Note: For the interim KSW Heavyweight Championship.)
Middleweight	Rafał Haratyk	vs.	Andi Vrtačić
Lightweight	Adam Soldaev	vs.	Hugo Deux
Featherweight	Souheil Kaouchen	vs.	Oleksii Polishchuk
Welterweight	Dawid Kuczmarski	vs.	Adam Niedźwiedź
Light Heavyweight	Kacper Sochacki	vs.	Aleksander Winiarski
Bantamweight	Cyprian Wieczorek	vs.	Karol Durszlewicz

== See also ==
- 2026 in UFC
- 2026 in ONE Championship
- 2026 in Professional Fighters League
- 2026 in Cage Warriors
- 2026 in Absolute Championship Akhmat
- 2026 in Oktagon MMA
- 2026 in Legacy Fighting Alliance
- 2026 in Rizin Fighting Federation
- 2026 in LUX Fight League
- 2026 in Brave Combat Federation
- 2026 in UAE Warriors
