= Arkadiusz Wrzosek =

Polish kickboxer (born 1992)

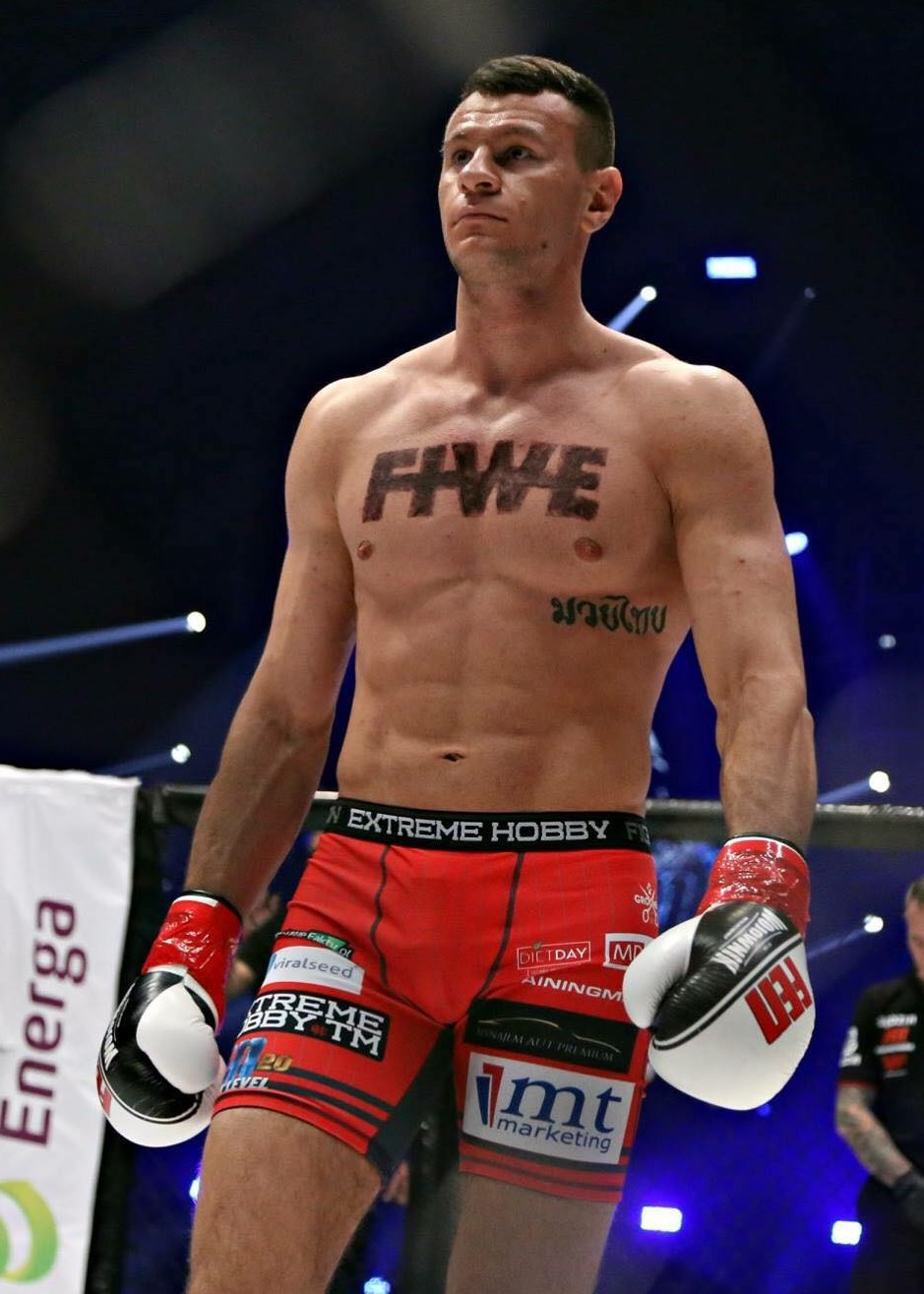
- Wrzosek in October 2017
- Born: June 3, 1992 (age 34); Pruszków, Poland
- Other names: The Polish Hightower
- Height: 2.01 m (6 ft 7 in)
- Weight: 107 kg (236 lb; 16.8 st)
- Division: Heavyweight; Cruiserweight
- Style: Kickboxing
- Fighting out of: Warsaw, Poland
- Team: Hemmers Gym Holland
- Trainer: Nick Hemmers
- Years active: 2011–present

Kickboxing record
- Total: 20
- Wins: 14
- By knockout: 9
- Losses: 5
- No contests: 1

Mixed martial arts record
- Total: 9
- Wins: 7
- By knockout: 5
- By submission: 1
- By decision: 1
- Losses: 2
- By submission: 2

Other information
- Mixed martial arts record from Sherdog
- Last updated on: July 2, 2026

Arkadiusz Wrzosek (born 3 June 1992) is a Polish kickboxer and mixed martial artist. He is currently competing for Konfrontacja Sztuk Walki (KSW), having previously competed in Glory as a Kickboxer. He is currently ranked #2 in the KSW Heavyweight rankings.

== Kickboxing career ==
Wrozek started martial arts training at the age of 19, at the Copacabana club in Warsaw, under the supervision of Igor Kołacin. He fought his first amateur fights in the Sanda formula, in which he won the cup and the Polish championship. In amateur formulas he fought over 40 fights, many times winning national and international competitions. In 2014-2017, a member of the national team. In 2015, he was a contender for the WKU world champion belt. He has been contracted with the FEN organization since 2015, and the heavyweight champion of this organization since 2017. In 2018, he signed a contract with the Fonfara Promotions group for his debut in professional boxing. In November 2018, he joined Glory, the largest organization kick-boxing in the world.

On March 16, 2019, he fought the last match for FEN. During the FEN 24 gala he defended the championship belt technically knocking out Patrick Schmid with low kicks.

At Glory 71, he replaced Demoreo Dennis's would-be opponent. In the second round he won by technical knockout, stopping the opponent with strong low kicks.

In the next duel, he faced the fight of the evening of the Glory 78 gala with a Dutchman of Moroccan origin, Badr Hari. Despite counting three times, in the second round he sensationally knocked out Hari with a high kick. The victory earned him the award for the best knockout of the year 2021.

On March 19, 2022, at Glory 80, there was a rematch between Wrzosek and Hari. The fight, planned for three rounds, did not last because of riots in the stands in which policemen and fans were injured. The gala was discontinued and the duel was deemed not to have taken place. Wrzosek was leading by 19:18 on all the judges' scorecards. The fans of Legia and ADO Den Haag supporting the Pole were quickly blamed for the brawl. According to the Wrzoska camp, the riots were provoked by the Moroccans who threw bottles and chairs at them. The fight was declared a No Contest.

== Mixed martial arts career ==
On June 15, 2022, the Polish Mixed Martial Arts promotion Konfrontacja Sztuk Walki informed fans via social media about the contracting of Arkadiusz Wrzosek. Three days later, during the KSW 71 gala, the match between Tomasz Sarara and Arkadiusz Wrzosek was announced as the main event of the KSW 73 gala, which took place on August 20, 2022 in Warsaw. Wrzosek made a successful debut in the MMA formula, beating Sarara via TKO in the third round.

Wrzosek faced Tomáš Možný at KSW 79 on February 25, 2023. He won the bout via unanimous decision.

Wrzosek faced former two-time world kickboxing champion and MMA debutant Bogdan Stoica at XTB KSW 83: Colosseum 2 on June 3, 2023. He won the bout via forearm choke in the first round.

Wrzosek faced his toughest test to date, facing FNC Champion Ivan Vitasović on January 20, 2024 at KSW 90: Wrzosek vs. Vitasović, winning the bout via TKO stoppage in the first round.

Wrzosek faced former WBC heavyweight title challenger Artur Szpilka on May 11, 2024 at XTB KSW 94: Bartosiński vs. Michaliszyn. He won the bout by knockout in the first round.

Wrzosek next faced Matheus Scheffel at KSW 100, on November 16, 2024. He won the bout via TKO in the opening round, dropping Scheffel with punches in under 30 seconds, where the fight was promptly stopped.

Wrozek challenged reigning KSW Heavyweight Champion Phillip De Fries, at KSW 107, on June 14, 2025. He lost the bout via submission in the first round, being taken down and forced to submit by De Fries after De Fries trapped Wrozek's arm in a Keylock.

Wrozek bounced back from this loss by taking on former KSW Heavyweight Title Challenger Szymon Bajor, at KSW 114, on January 17, 2026. He won the bout via TKO in the second round, where an attempted head kick instead felt short, causing Wrozek to instead knee Bajor in the head, where upon he dropped to the canvas, and the bout was stopped.

Wrozek was announced for a bout with another former KSW Heavyweight Title Challenger, Štefan Vojčák, at KSW 117, on April 18, 2026, but was forced to withdraw following a rib injury.

Wrozek instead faced Vojčák at KSW 119, on June 19, 2026. He lost the bout via submission in the second round, where he was taken down and submitted via a "Mother's Milk Choke", also known as a Mounted Chest Compression.

== Championships and accomplishments ==
=== Kickboxing ===
==== Professional ====
- 2017 Fight Exclusive Night Heavyweight (+95 kg/209 lb) Championship (one time)
  - Two successful title defenses
- 2018 ISKA international Heavyweight (+95 kg/209 lb) Championship (one time)
- 2021 Glory Knockout of the Year

==== Amateur ====
- 2013 Polish Sanda Cup 1st place (-90 kg/198 lb)
- 2014 Polish Sanda Champion (-100 kg/220 lb)
- 2014 Polish Muay Thai IFMA Runner-up (-91 kg/200 lb)
- 2014 European Muay Thai IFMA Champion (-91 kg/200 lb)
- 2015 Polish Muay Thai IFMA Champion (+91 kg/200 lb)
- 2016 K-1 Global World Champion (+91 kg/200 lb)
- 2017 Polish Kickboxing Cup 1st place (+91 kg/200 lb)

== Mixed martial arts record ==
Professional record breakdown
9 matches	7 wins	2 losses
By knockout	5	0
By submission	1	2
By decision	1	0

Res.	Record	Opponent	Method	Event	Date	Round	Time	Location	Notes
Loss	7–2	Štefan Vojčák	Submission (smother choke)	KSW 119	June 19, 2026	2	1:25	Radom, Poland	
Win	7–1	Szymon Bajor	KO (knee)	KSW 114	January 17, 2026	2	0:40	Radom, Poland	Knockout of the Night.
Loss	6–1	Phil De Fries	Submission (keylock)	KSW 107	June 14, 2025	1	3:33	Gdańsk, Poland	For the KSW Heavyweight Championship.
Win	6–0	Matheus Scheffel	TKO (punches)	KSW 100	November 16, 2024	1	0:24	Gliwice, Poland	
Win	5–0	Artur Szpilka	KO (punches)	KSW 94	May 11, 2024	1	0:14	Gdańsk, Poland	
Win	4–0	Ivan Vitasović	TKO (punches)	KSW 90	January 20, 2024	1	0:55	Warsaw, Poland	
Win	3–0	Bogdan Stoica	Submission (forearm choke)	KSW 83	June 3, 2023	1	2:09	Warsaw, Poland	
Win	2–0	Tomáš Možný	Decision (unanimous)	KSW 79	February 25, 2023	3	5:00	Liberec, Czech Republic	Fight of the Night.
Win	1–0	Tomasz Sarara	TKO (punches)	KSW 73	August 20, 2022	3	3:55	Warsaw, Poland	Heavyweight debut. Fight of the Night.

== Kickboxing record ==
Kickboxing record (Incomplete)
14 Wins (9 (T)KO's, 4 decisions), 5 Losses, 0 Draw, 1 No Contest
Date	Result	Opponent	Event	Location	Method	Round	Time
2022-03-19	NC	(Morocco) Badr Hari	Glory 80	Hasselt, Belgium	No Contest	2	3:00
The fight was cancelled after two rounds due to safety concerns over a riot in the audience. The bout was determined a No Contest.
2021-09-04	Win	(Morocco) Badr Hari	Glory 78: Rotterdam	Rotterdam, Netherlands	KO (Head Kick)	2	1:30
2019-11-22	Win	(United States) Demoreo Dennis	Glory 71: Chicago	Chicago, USA	TKO (Leg Kicks)	2	2:59
2019-03-16	Win	(Switzerland) Patrick Schmid	FEN 24: All or Nothing	Warsaw, Poland	TKO (Leg Kicks)	5	0:23
Retains the FEN Heavyweight Championship.
2018-12-08	Loss	(Romania) Benjamin Adegbuyi	Glory 62: Rotterdam Semi Final	Rotterdam, Netherlands	Decision (Unanimous)	3	3:00
2018-10-27	Win	(Russia) Vladimir Toktasynov	Granda PRO 7	Warsaw, Poland	TKO	1	1:05
Wins the ISKA international Heavyweight Championship.
2018-04-28	Win	(Moldova) Pawel Voronin	Granda PRO 6	Warsaw, Poland	TKO	1	1:10
Originally ruled a No Contest, overturned to a TKO win for Wrzosek when staff appealed the decision.
2018-03-10	Win	(Poland) Artur Bizewski	FEN 20: Next Level	Warsaw, Poland	Decision	5	3:00
Retains the FEN Heavyweight Championship.
2017-11-03	Loss	(Netherlands) Colin George	VIP Fight Night	Dubai, UAE	KO	3	2:47
2017-10-14	Win	(Germany) Nikolai Falin	FEN 19: Battle for Wroclaw	Warsaw, Poland	KO	1	1:49
Wins the FEN Heavyweight Championship.
2017-06-09	Win	(Germany) Kai Durak	Granda PRO 4	Warsaw, Poland	TKO	2	2:41
2017-04-08	Win	(Slovakia) Tomáš Klimacek	GSW Radomsko	Radomsko, Poland	KO	1	2:13
2017-03-11	Win	(Poland) Artur Bizewski	FEN 16: Warsaw Reloaded	Warsaw, Poland	Decision (unanimous)	3	3:00
2016-11-01	Win	(Belarus) Alexey Buchinsky	PLMMA 70: Championships	Warsaw, Poland	KO (kicks)	1	1:47
2016-08-13	Win	(Poland) Kryspin Kalski	FEN 13: Summer Edition	Gdynia, Poland	Decision (split)	4	3:00
2016-03-19	Loss	(Germany) Nikolai Falin	FEN 11: Warsaw Time	Warsaw, Poland	Decision (split)	4	3:00
2015-10-16	Loss	(Slovakia) Tomáš Možný	Boxing Night 11	Warsaw, Poland	Decision (unanimous)	5	3:00
Fight for the WKU World Champion belt.
2015-06-28	Loss	(Poland) Artur Bizewski	WBT	Gdynia, Poland	Decision (unanimous)	3	3:00
Legend: Win Loss Draw/No contest Notes

Amateur Muay Thai record
Date	Result	Opponent	Event	Location	Method	Round	Time
2014-09-	Win	(France) Florent Kaouachi	2014 IFMA European Championships, Tournament Final	Poland	TKO (Injury)	2	2:00
Wins 2014 IFMA European Championships -91kg Gold Medal.
2014-09-	Win	(Germany) Jakob Styben	2014 IFMA European Championships, Tournament Semifinal	Poland	Decision	3	3:00
Legend: Win Loss Draw/No contest Notes

== Professional boxing record ==
1 fight	1 win	0 losses
By decision	1	0

No.	Result	Record	Opponent	Type	Round, time	Date	Location	Notes
1	Win	1–0	(Democratic Republic of the Congo) Arnod Kasongo	UD	4 (4), 3:00	16 June 2018	Arena COS Torwar, Warsaw, Poland	

== See also ==
- List of male kickboxers
