= Rogério Bontorin =

Brazilian mixed martial artist

- Born: 25 April 1992 (age 34); Adrianópolis, Paraná, Brazil
- Height: 5 ft 5 in (1.65 m)
- Weight: 125 lb (57 kg; 8 st 13 lb)
- Division: Bantamweight; Flyweight
- Reach: 67 in (170 cm)
- Team: Gile Ribeiro Team; Team Noguchi
- Rank: Black belt in Brazilian Jiu-Jitsu
- Years active: 2013–present

Mixed martial arts record
- Total: 26
- Wins: 17
- By knockout: 3
- By submission: 11
- By decision: 3
- Losses: 7
- By knockout: 3
- By submission: 2
- By decision: 2
- No contests: 2

Other information
- Mixed martial arts record from Sherdog

Rogério Bontorin (born 25 April 1992) is a Brazilian mixed martial artist who competes in the Flyweight division of Rizin Fighting Federation. A professional since 2013, he most notably fought in the Ultimate Fighting Championship (UFC). He was the formal 57 kg Brazilian Jiu-jitsu Northeast Brazil champion.

== Background ==
Bontorin, a resident of Colombo, Paraná, Brazil in a family farm where he works. He started his MMA career at the age of 18.

== Mixed martial arts career ==
=== Early career ===
Bontorin made his professional debut in 2013 and fought primarily in his native country Brazil as well as Japanese promotion Pancrase.

Bontorin faced Takeshi Kasugai at Pancrase 283 on 18 December 2016. He missed the contracted weight and went on to win the fight via first-round submission. However, the win was overturned to no contest due to the weight miss.

He amassed a record of 13–1 (1) prior to participate in Dana White's Contender Series.

=== Dana White Contender Series ===
Bontorin appeared in Dana White's Contender Series Brazil 1 web-series program. He faced Gustavo Gabriel Silva on 10 August 2018 and won the fight via a submission in round two. With the win, Bontorin was offered a UFC contract.

=== Ultimate Fighting Championship ===
Bontorin made his promotional debut on 2 February 2019 at UFC Fight Night: Assunção vs. Moraes 2, facing Magomed Bibulatov. At the weigh-ins, Bibulatov weighed in at 127 pounds, 1 pound over the flyweight non-title fight limit of 126 and he was fined 20 percent of his purse, which went to Bontorin. He won the fight via unanimous decision.

His next fight came on 10 August 2019 at UFC Fight Night: Shevchenko vs. Carmouche 2 against Raulian Paiva. He won the fight via technical knockout by cutting the eyebrow of Paiva in round one.

On 15 February 2020 Bontorin faced Ray Borg at UFC Fight Night: Anderson vs. Błachowicz 2. At the weigh-ins, Borg failed to make weight, coming in at 128 pounds, two pounds over the flyweight non-title limit of 126 pounds. He was fined 30% of his fight purse, which went to Bontorin and the bout proceeded at a catchweight. He lost the fight via unanimous decision.

Bontorin was scheduled to face Manel Kape on 15 August 2020 at UFC 252. However, Bontorin pulled out of the fight on 22 July due to an ankle injury. Promotion officials tried to find a replacement for Kape but he was eventually removed from the card.

Bontorin faced Kai Kara-France on 6 March 2021 at UFC 259. He lost the fight via knockout in round one.

Bontorin faced Matt Schnell, replacing Alex Perez, on 15 May 2021 at UFC 262. At the weigh ins, Bontorin weighed in at 137 pounds, 1 pound over the bantamweight non-title fight limit. The bout proceeded at catchweight and Bontorin was fined 20% of his individual purse, which went to Schnell. He won the fight via unanimous decision.

In June 2021, Bontorin was flagged by USADA for a potential doping violation. Bontorin tested positive for hydrochlorothiazide, a banned diuretic, in an out-of-competition sample in May 2021. Bontorin, tested positive for hydrochlorothiazide (HCTZ) as the result of a urine sample collected out-of-competition on 1 May 2021. Following notification of his positive test, Bontorin provided open containers of two dietary supplements he obtained from a Brazilian compounding pharmacy that he was using prior to his positive test for analysis by a WADA-accredited laboratory. Although no prohibited substances were listed on the supplement product labels, the analysis revealed the presence of HCTZ in the products. Bontorin was given a three month suspension that began on 1 May 2021. The result was overturned to a no contest.

Bontorin faced Brandon Royval on 15 January 2022 at UFC on ESPN 32. He lost the fight via split decision.

Bontorin was scheduled to face Manel Kape on June 11, 2022, at UFC 275. However, the bout was scrapped the day before the event due to Bontorin suffering kidney issues related to cutting weight.

On June 23, 2022, it was announced that Bontorin was released from his contract and no longer on the UFC roster. Bontorin is planning on moving up to Bantamweight.

=== Rizin FF ===
In his first bout post UFC, Bontorin faced Yuki Motoya on December 31, 2022 at Rizin 40. He lost by KO due to a flying knee in the second round.

Bontorin faced Yutaro Muramoto at Rizin Landmark 6 on October 1, 2023, winning the bout by unanimous decision.

== Submission grappling career ==
Bontorin faced Muhammad Mokaev in the main event of ADXC 6 on October 25, 2024. He won the match by split decision.

Bontorin faced Askar Askarov at ADXC 10 on May 31, 2025. He lost the match by decision.

== Mixed martial arts record ==
Professional record breakdown
| 26 matches | 17 wins | 7 losses |
| By knockout | 3 | 3 |
| By submission | 11 | 2 |
| By decision | 3 | 2 |
| No contests | 2 | |

| Res. | Record | Opponent | Method | Event | Date | Round | Time | Location | Notes |
|---|---|---|---|---|---|---|---|---|---|
| Loss | 17–7 (2) | Kamil Szkaradek | Submission (kneebar) | KSW 123 | November 21, 2026 | 1 | 2:33 | Szczecin, Poland | Catchweight (138 lb) bout; Szkaradek missed weight. |
| Loss | 17–6 (2) | Vitalii Yakymenko | TKO (punches) | KSW 110 | September 20, 2025 | 3 | 4:30 | Rzeszów, Poland | |
| Win | 17–5 (2) | Yutaro Muramoto | Decision (unanimous) | Rizin Landmark 6 | 1 October 2023 | 3 | 5:00 | Nagoya, Japan | Flyweight bout. |
| Loss | 16–5 (2) | Yuki Motoya | KO (knee) | Rizin 40 | 31 December 2022 | 2 | 2:56 | Saitama, Japan | Return to Bantamweight. |
| Loss | 16–4 (2) | Brandon Royval | Decision (split) | UFC on ESPN: Kattar vs. Chikadze | 15 January 2022 | 3 | 5:00 | Las Vegas, Nevada, United States | |
| NC | 16–3 (2) | Matt Schnell | NC (overturned) | UFC 262 | 15 May 2021 | 3 | 5:00 | Houston, Texas, United States | Bantamweight bout; Bontorin missed weight (137 lb). Originally a unanimous decision win for Bontorin; overturned after he tested positive for hydrochlorothiazide. |
| Loss | 16–3 (1) | Kai Kara-France | KO (punches) | UFC 259 | 6 March 2021 | 1 | 4:55 | Las Vegas, Nevada, United States | |
| Loss | 16–2 (1) | Ray Borg | Decision (unanimous) | UFC Fight Night: Anderson vs. Błachowicz 2 | 15 February 2020 | 3 | 5:00 | Rio Rancho, New Mexico, United States | Catchweight (128 lb) bout; Borg missed weight. |
| Win | 16–1 (1) | Raulian Paiva | TKO (doctor stoppage) | UFC Fight Night: Shevchenko vs. Carmouche 2 | 10 August 2019 | 1 | 2:56 | Montevideo, Uruguay | |
| Win | 15–1 (1) | Magomed Bibulatov | Decision (split) | UFC Fight Night: Assunção vs. Moraes 2 | 2 February 2019 | 3 | 5:00 | Fortaleza, Brazil | |
| Win | 14–1 (1) | Gustavo Gabriel Silva | Submission (rear-naked choke) | Dana White's Contender Series Brazil 1 | 10 August 2018 | 2 | 2:46 | Las Vegas, Nevada, United States | Return to Flyweight. |
| Win | 13–1 (1) | Paulo César Cardoso | TKO (elbows) | Imortal FC 8 | 7 April 2018 | 3 | 2:46 | São José dos Pinhais, Brazil | |
| Loss | 12–1 (1) | Michinori Tanaka | Submission (rear-naked choke) | Grandslam MMA 6 | 29 October 2017 | 3 | 2:27 | Colombo, Brazil | |
| Win | 12–0 (1) | Rildeci Lima Dias | TKO (punches) | Katana Fight: Gold Edition | 5 August 2017 | 1 | 0:48 | São José dos Pinhais, Brazil | |
| Win | 11–0 (1) | Jon Olivar | Submission (rear-naked choke) | Brave CF 3 | 18 March 2017 | 1 | 3:00 | Curitiba, Brazil | Return to Bantamweight. |
| NC | 10–0 (1) | Takeshi Kasugai | NC (missed weight) | Pancrase 283 | 18 December 2016 | 1 | 2:19 | Tokyo, Japan | |
| Win | 10–0 | Cristiano Souza | Submission (armbar) | Imortal FC 5 | 23 July 2016 | 1 | 2:05 | São José dos Pinhais, Brazil | Won the Imortal FC Flyweight Tournament. |
| Win | 9–0 | Ivonei Pridonik | Submission (armbar) | Imortal FC 5 | 23 July 2016 | 2 | 1:06 | São José dos Pinhais, Brazil | Imortal FC Flyweight Tournament Semifinal. |
| Win | 8–0 | Israel Silva Lima | Submission (heel hook) | XFC International 11 | 19 September 2015 | 1 | 1:20 | São Paulo, Brazil | Flyweight debut. |
| Win | 7–0 | Carlisson Diego Oliveira dos Santos | Submission (rear-naked choke) | Curitiba Fight Pro 3 | 7 March 2015 | 2 | 4:06 | Curitiba, Brazil | |
| Win | 6–0 | Genilson Lacerda | Submission (rear-naked choke) | Striker's House Cup 38 | 28 June 2014 | 1 | 1:27 | Curitiba, Brazil | |
| Win | 5–0 | Jeferson Guilherme Pereira | Submission (rear-naked choke) | Power Fight Extreme 11 | 17 May 2014 | 1 | 3:51 | Curitiba, Brazil | |
| Win | 4–0 | Carlos do Amaral | Submission (rear-naked choke) | Curitiba Fight Pro 1 | 22 February 2014 | 1 | N/A | Curitiba, Brazil | |
| Win | 3–0 | Jonathan Inácio | Decision (unanimous) | Gladiator Combat Fight 3 | 18 August 2013 | 3 | 5:00 | Curitiba, Brazil | |
| Win | 2–0 | Cleverson Luiz Candido | Submission (rear-naked choke) | Xtreme Fisiomaq Combat 1 | 8 June 2013 | 2 | 1:12 | Araucária, Brazil | |
| Win | 1–0 | Genilson Lacerda | Submission (rear-naked choke) | Gladiator Combat Fight 1 | 6 April 2013 | 1 | 4:30 | Curitiba, Brazil | Bantamweight debut. |

== See also ==
- List of current Rizin FF fighters
- List of male mixed martial artists
