= Štefan Vojčák =

Slovak mixed martial artist (born 1990)

- Born: April 2, 1990 (age 36); Bratislava, Slovakia
- Other names: Mutant
- Height: 6 ft 5 in (1.96 m)
- Weight: 260 lb (118 kg; 18 st 8 lb)
- Division: Heavyweight (2021–present)
- Reach: 79 in (201 cm)
- Style: Brazilian jiu-jitsu
- Stance: Orthodox
- Fighting out of: Bratislava, Slovakia
- Team: Octagon Fighting Academy
- Rank: Purple belt in Brazilian jiu-jitsu
- Years active: 2021–present

Mixed martial arts record
- Total: 13
- Wins: 11
- By knockout: 6
- By submission: 4
- By decision: 1
- Losses: 2
- By knockout: 2

Other information
- Mixed martial arts record from Sherdog

Štefan Vojčák is a Slovak professional mixed martial artist. He currently competes in the Heavyweight division for Konfrontacja Sztuk Walki (KSW). A professional mixed martial artist since 2021, He is the current interim KSW Heavyweight Champion.

== Professional career ==
=== Early career ===
Vojčák made his professional debut on September 11, 2021, for the promotion Oktagon MMA. He faced Ukraine's Evgeniy Golub. Vojčák would win via TKO thirty seconds into the first round. As of 2025, this was his only fight under the promotion.

His next fight came half a year later against Hungary's László Kiss. Vojčák would win via TKO in the first round.

He would return four months later in a bout against Serbia's Stefan Stanković. Vojčák would win via submission thirty seconds into the first round.

He would return a month later against Austria's Dritan Barjamaj. Vojčák would win via a first round submission.

His next fight would come three months later, where he took on Romania's Ion Grigore. Vojčák would win via his third first round submission in a row.

=== UAE Warriors ===
His next fight would come three months later under the promotion UAE Warriors. He would face France's Sofiane Boukichou, whom he would beat via Unanimous Decision.

=== Konfrontacja Sztuk Walki ===
He would return five months later, when he faced his toughest challenge yet in Darko Stošić. Vojčák would lose the fight via a third-round knockout, thus suffering his first career defeat.

He would return four months later in a bout against Kamil Gawryjołek. Vojčák would win via a first-round TKO.

After a half-year hiatus, Vojčák would return in a bout against Brazil's Ricardo Prasel. Vojčák would win via a second-round KO.

Five months later, he would return in a bout against Czech Republic's Michal Martínek. Vojčák would win via a second-round TKO.

Following a year-long hiatus, Vojčák faced Phil De Fries on October 18, 2025 for Phil's KSW Heavyweight Championship. Vojčák lost the fight via a third-round TKO.

His next fight came on June 23, 2026, against Arkadiusz Wrzosek. Vojčák won the fight via a second-round submission.

== Mixed martial arts record ==
Professional record breakdown
| 13 matches | 11 wins | 2 losses |
| By knockout | 6 | 2 |
| By submission | 4 | 0 |
| By decision | 1 | 0 |

| Res. | Record | Opponent | Method | Event | Date | Round | Time | Location | Notes |
|---|---|---|---|---|---|---|---|---|---|
| Win | 11–2 | Marcin Wójcik | TKO (head kick and punches) | KSW 121 | September 19, 2026 | 4 | 2:36 | Liberec, Czech Republic | Won the interim KSW Heavyweight Championship. Knockout of the Night. |
| Win | 10–2 | Arkadiusz Wrzosek | Submission (smother choke) | KSW 119 | June 19, 2026 | 2 | 1:25 | Radom, Poland | |
| Loss | 9–2 | Phil De Fries | TKO (punches) | KSW 111 | October 18, 2025 | 3 | 4:27 | Třinec, Czech Republic | For the KSW Heavyweight Championship. |
| Win | 9–1 | Michal Martínek | TKO (punches) | KSW 99 | October 19, 2024 | 2 | 2:53 | Gliwice, Poland | |
| Win | 8–1 | Ricardo Prasel | KO (punch) | KSW 94 | May 11, 2024 | 2 | 0:47 | Gdańsk, Poland | |
| Win | 7–1 | Kamil Gawryjołek | TKO (punches) | KSW 88 | November 11, 2023 | 1 | 1:06 | Radom, Poland | |
| Loss | 6–1 | Darko Stošić | KO (punches) | KSW 84 | July 15, 2023 | 3 | 2:34 | Gdynia, Poland | |
| Win | 6–0 | Sofiane Boukichou | Decision (unanimous) | UAE Warriors 36 | February 25, 2023 | 3 | 5:00 | Abu Dhabi, United Arab Emirates | |
| Win | 5–0 | Ion Grigore | Submission (chest smother) | RFA 6 | November 12, 2022 | 1 | 3:52 | Prievidza, Slovakia | |
| Win | 4–0 | Dritan Barjamaj | Submission (keylock) | German MMA Championship 28 | August 6, 2022 | 1 | N/A | Rozvadov, Czech Republic | |
| Win | 3–0 | Stefan Stanković | Submission (rear-naked choke) | Serbian Battle Championship 42 | July 16, 2022 | 1 | 0:27 | Bački Petrovac, Serbia | |
| Win | 2–0 | László Kiss | TKO (punches) | RFA: Warm-Up | March 12, 2022 | 1 | 1:33 | Bratislava, Slovakia | |
| Win | 1–0 | Evgeniy Golub | TKO (punches) | Oktagon 27 | September 11, 2021 | 1 | 0:29 | Nové Mesto, Slovakia | |
