= Artur Szpilka =

Polish boxer (born 1989)

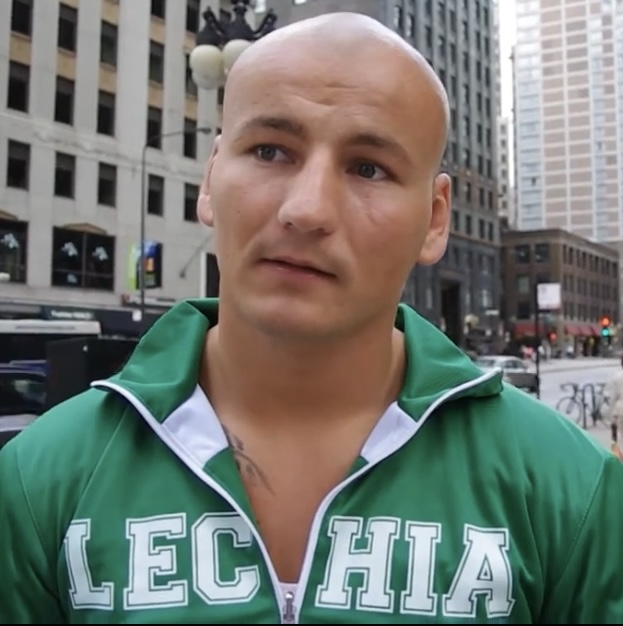
- Szpilka in 2013
- Born: 12 April 1989 (age 37); Wieliczka, Poland
- Nickname: Szpila ("The Pin")
- Height: 6 ft 4 in (193 cm)
- Weight: 224 lb (102 kg; 16 st 0 lb)
- Division: Cruiserweight (Boxing); Bridgerweight (Boxing); Heavyweight (Boxing); Heavyweight (MMA) (2022–present)
- Reach: 76 in (193 cm)
- Style: Boxing
- Years active: 2008–2021 (boxing); 2022–present (MMA)

Professional boxing record
- Total: 29
- Wins: 24
- By knockout: 16
- Losses: 5
- By knockout: 5

Mixed martial arts record
- Total: 7
- Wins: 6
- By knockout: 4
- By submission: 1
- By decision: 1
- Losses: 1
- By knockout: 1

Other information
- Boxing record from BoxRec
- Mixed martial arts record from Sherdog

Artur Szpilka ([ˈartur ˈʂpilka]; born 12 April 1989) is a Polish mixed martial artist and former professional boxer who competed from 2008 to 2021. He challenged once for the WBC heavyweight title in 2016. He holds a notable win over former two-weight world champion Tomasz Adamek.

== Early life ==
Szpilka was born in Wieliczka, Poland in 1989. He has said he was a football hooligan before a local boxing coach suggested he should take up boxing instead. As an amateur, Szpilka won the Polish national heavyweight title and reached the quarterfinals of the Junior world championships before turning professional in 2008. In October 2009, when he was 20 years old, he was arrested for being involved in a brawl between rival football fans and spent 18 months in prison.

== Professional career ==
=== Early career ===
On 30 June 2012, Szpilka fought Jameel McCline in Łódź, Poland, which he won by unanimous decision (UD). Szpilka's win over McCline and his perfect 12–0 record secured him a fight with Mike Mollo in 2013; he overcame two knockdowns to beat Mollo by a sixth-round knockout. An attempt at revenge by Mollo saw Szpilka winning again by knockout, this time in the fifth, though Szpilka once again had to overcome a knockdown.

=== Szpilka vs. Jennings ===
On 25 January 2014, Szpilka suffered his first defeat against Bryant Jennings. Jennings initially was to face Mariusz Wach, however Wach pulled out of the fight, and Szpilka stepped in after calling out Jennings on Twitter. The fight took place in Madison Square Garden in New York City, New York. Szpilka lost the fight by referee stoppage in the final round.

=== Szpilka vs. Adamek ===
Later that year, on 8 November 2014, Szpilka scored his most significant win with a ten-round UD over former light-heavyweight and cruiserweight world champion Tomasz Adamek.

=== WBC heavyweight title challenge ===
==== Szpilka vs. Wilder ====
On 16 January 2016, he fought for the WBC heavyweight title against defending champion Deontay Wilder. Szpilka proved an awkward opponent for Wilder with his elusive style, making the champion miss on many occasions. Unfortunately for Szpilka, while advancing closer to Wilder in round nine, he was caught by a hard right hook on the chin which knocked him out cold. He remained on the canvas for several minutes and needed to be stretchered out of the ring.

=== Return to the ring ===
==== Szpilka vs. Kownacki ====
About a year and a half after the Wilder fight, Szpilka made his comeback in New York against compatriot Adam Kownacki. Kownacki was in control for most of the fight, dropping Szpilka and subsequently getting a TKO victory in the fourth round. His next fight was against American Dominick Guinn, whom he defeated by unanimous decision.

==== Szpilka vs. Wach ====
After that, Szpilka had another all-Polish main event, this time against former heavyweight world title challenger Mariusz Wach. Szpilka was visibly smaller and was hit flush several times, and at times the fight seemed like it was going to be stopped. However, in the end he succeeded in edging out Wach by a tiny margin and won by split decision.

==== Szpilka vs. Chisora ====
On 20 July 2019, Szpilka fought former world title challenger Derek Chisora. In what was expected to be an action-packed and entertaining fight, Chisora managed to make easy work out of the Pole and knocked him out in the second round. On March 7, 2020, Szpilka moved down to Cruiserweight and won his first fight against Serhiy Radchenko by way of majority decision.

==== Szpilka vs. Rozanski ====
Spilka returned to Heavyweight to face Lukasz Rozanski, on May 30, 2021, for the newly created and vacant WBC Bridgerweight Title. He lost the bout via KO in the first round. Despite dropping Rozanski moments into the round, Szpilka himself would be knocked down three times by Rozanski, with the third and final knockdown rendering him unable to continue. Szpilka has not fought in professional Boxing since this loss, instead transitioning to Mixed Martial Arts, where he currently holds a 5-1 record.

== Mixed martial arts career ==
In 2022, it was announced that Szpilka would make his mixed martial arts debut against his former opponent in boxing, Serhiy Radchenko at KSW 71: Ziółkowski vs. Rajewski on 18 June 2022. He won the bout via second-round technical knockout.

In his sophomore bout in the sport, Szpilka faced Denis Załęcki at High League 4 on 17 September 2022. He won the bout via first round technical knockout after Załęcki suffered a knee injury.

Szpilka was then scheduled to face Arkadiusz Wrzosek at XTB KSW 78: Materla vs. Grove 2 on 21 January 2023. However, the bout was scrapped as Szpilka withdrew from the bout citing a back injury.

Szpilka faced former World's Strongest Man Mariusz Pudzianowski at XTB KSW 83: Colosseum 2 on 3 June 2023. He won the bout via technical knockout in the second round.

Szpilka next faced former Glory Kickboxer Arkadiusz Wrzosek at XTB KSW 94: Bartosiński vs Michaliszyn on 11 May 2024. He lost the bout via knockout in the first round.

Splika rebounded from this loss by facing former K-1 and current Glory Kickboxer, Errol Zimmerman, at XTB KSW 105: Bartosiński vs. Grzebyk, on April 26, 2025. He won the bout via submission in the first round, where after both he and Zimmerman rocked one another with punches, Szpilka took Zimmerman down and forced him to submit via an arm-triangle choke.

Spzilka next faced former Oktagon MMA Heavyweight champion Michal Martínek, at KSW 113, on December 20, 2025. Spzilka won the bout via TKO in the second round, dropping Martinek with a jab-cross combination, before finishing him with ground strikes. This bout lead to Szpilka being officially ranked in the KSW Heavyweight Division.

Szpilka then faced UFC veteran Augusto Sakai in his next fight, at KSW 120, on July 18, 2026. He won the bout via unanimous decision, dropping Sakai with a hard combination in the process.

== Professional boxing record ==
29 fights	24 wins	5 losses
By knockout	16	5
By decision	8	0

No.	Result	Record	Opponent	Type	Round, time	Date	Location	Notes
29	Loss	24–5	Lukasz Rozanski	KO	1 (10), 2:25	30 May 2021	Podpromie Hall, Rzeszów, Poland	For vacant WBC International bridgerweight title
28	Win	24–4	Serhiy Radchenko	MD	10	7 Mar 2020	Hala Sportowa im. Olimpijczykow, Łomża, Poland	
27	Win	23–4	Fabio Tuiach	KO	1 (10), 1:27	26 Oct 2019	Hala Sportowa Zeromskiego 9, Sosnowiec, Poland	
26	Loss	22–4	Derek Chisora	KO	2 (10), 1:01	20 Jul 2019	The O2 Arena, London, England	
25	Win	22–3	Mariusz Wach	SD	10	10 Nov 2018	Arena Gliwice, Gliwice, Poland	
24	Win	21–3	Dominick Guinn	UD	10	25 May 2018	National Stadium, Warsaw, Poland	
23	Loss	20–3	Adam Kownacki	TKO	4 (10), 1:37	15 Jul 2017	Nassau Veterans Memorial Coliseum, Uniondale, New York, US	
22	Loss	20–2	Deontay Wilder	KO	9 (12), 2:24	16 Jan 2016	Barclays Center, New York City, New York, US	For WBC heavyweight title
21	Win	20–1	Yasmany Consuegra	RTD	2 (8), 3:00	14 Aug 2015	Prudential Center, Newark, New Jersey, US	
20	Win	19–1	Manuel Quezada	RTD	3 (8), 3:00	12 Jun 2015	UIC Pavilion, Chicago, Illinois, US	
19	Win	18–1	Ty Cobb	TKO	2 (8), 1:46	24 Apr 2015	UIC Pavilion, Chicago, Illinois, US	
18	Win	17–1	Tomasz Adamek	UD	10	8 Nov 2014	Tauron Arena, Kraków, Poland	Won vacant IBF International and Republic of Poland International heavyweight titles
17	Loss	16–1	Bryant Jennings	TKO	10 (10), 2:20	25 Jan 2014	The Theater at Madison Square Garden, New York City, New York, US	
16	Win	16–0	Mike Mollo	TKO	5 (10), 1:41	16 Aug 2013	US Cellular Field, Chicago, Illinois, US	
15	Win	15–0	Brian Minto	UD	10	15 Jun 2013	Łuczniczka, Bydgoszcz, Poland	Won vacant WBC interim Baltic heavyweight title
14	Win	14–0	Taras Bidenko	RTD	1 (10), 3:00	20 Apr 2013	Hala Podpromie, Rzeszów, Poland	
13	Win	13–0	Mike Mollo	KO	6 (8), 2:45	1 Feb 2013	UIC Pavilion, Chicago, Illinois, US	
12	Win	12–0	Jameel McCline	UD	10	30 Jun 2012	Atlas Arena, Łódź, Poland	
11	Win	11–0	Gonzalo Basile	KO	4 (10), 1:43	2 Jun 2012	Łuczniczka, Bydgoszcz, Poland	Won vacant WBC Baltic Silver and WBC Youth Silver heavyweight titles
10	Win	10–0	Terrance Marbra	TKO	1 (6), 2:46	24 Mar 2012	Resorts Casino Hotel, Atlantic City, New Jersey, US	
9	Win	9–0	David Saulsberry	KO	2 (6), 1:09	5 Nov 2011	Mohegan Sun Arena, Montville, Connecticut, US	
8	Win	8–0	Owen Beck	RTD	4 (6), 3:00	15 Oct 2011	Spodek, Katowice, Poland	
7	Win	7–0	David Williams	KO	1 (4), 1:53	29 Jul 2011	Mohegan Sun Arena, Montville, Connecticut, US	
6	Win	6–0	Ramiz Hadziaganovic	KO	1 (4), 0:33	25 Jun 2011	Podpromie Hall, Rzeszów, Poland	
5	Win	5–0	Jeremy May	KO	1 (4), 1:20	31 Jul 2009	Hard Rock Live, Hollywood, Florida, US	
4	Win	4–0	Zoltan Kallai	PTS	4	16 May 2009	GranTeatro, Rome, Italy	
3	Win	3–0	Viktor Szalai	TKO	1 (4), 1:46	28 Feb 2009	Lublin, Poland	
2	Win	2–0	Mihaly Nemet	TKO	2 (4), 0:53	29 Nov 2008	Spodek, Katowice, Poland	
1	Win	1–0	Senol Cente	UD	4	18 Oct 2008	MOSiR Hall, Zabrze, Poland	

== Mixed martial arts record ==
Professional record breakdown
7 matches	6 wins	1 loss
By knockout	4	1
By submission	1	0
By decision	1	0

Res.	Record	Opponent	Method	Event	Date	Round	Time	Location	Notes
Win	6–1	Augusto Sakai	Decision (unanimous)	KSW 120	July 18, 2026	3	5:00	Gdynia, Poland	
Win	5–1	Michal Martínek	TKO (punches)	KSW 113	December 20, 2025	2	2:07	Łódź, Poland	
Win	4–1	Errol Zimmerman	Submission (arm-triangle choke)	KSW 105	April 26, 2025	1	1:49	Gliwice, Poland	
Loss	3–1	Arkadiusz Wrzosek	KO (punches)	KSW 94	May 11, 2024	1	0:14	Gdańsk, Poland	
Win	3–0	Mariusz Pudzianowski	TKO (punches)	KSW 83	June 3, 2023	2	0:31	Warsaw, Poland	Heavyweight debut.
Win	2–0	Denis Załęcki	TKO (knee injury)	High League 4	September 17, 2022	1	0:41	Gliwice, Poland	Openweight bout.
Win	1–0	Serhiy Radchenko	TKO (submission to elbow)	KSW 71	June 18, 2022	2	2:52	Toruń, Poland	Catchweight (231 lb) bout.

== Pay-per-view bouts ==
Date	Fight	Pay-per-view buys	Network	Source(s)
8 November 2014	Tomasz Adamek vs. Artur Szpilka	100,000	Cyfrowy Polsat PPV	
	Total sales	100,000		

== Filmography ==
Year	Title	Role	Notes
2018	Pitbull: Last Dog	Boxer 1	

Sporting positions
Regional boxing titles
New title	WBC Baltic Silver heavyweight champion 2 June 2012 – September 2012; Vacated	Vacant Title next held by Vyacheslav Glazkov
New title	WBC Silver Youth heavyweight champion 2 June 2012 – January 2014; Vacated	Vacant Title next held by Ergun Mersin
New title	WBC Baltic heavyweight champion Interim title 15 June 2013 – January 2014; Vacated	Vacant
Vacant Title last held by Kubrat Pulev	IBF International heavyweight champion 8 November 2014 – December 2015; Vacated	Vacant Title next held by Robert Helenius
Vacant Title last held by Andrzej Wawrzyk	Poland International heavyweight champion 8 November 2014 – February 2016; Vacated	Vacant Title next held by Mike Mollo
