= 2021 in Konfrontacja Sztuk Walki =

Mixed martial arts events

Information
- First date: January 30, 2021
- Last date: December 18, 2021

Events
- Total events: 8

Fights
- Total fights: 72
- Title fights: 8

Chronology
2020 in KSW	2021 in Konfrontacja Sztuk Walki	2022 in KSW

The year 2021 was the 18th year in the history of the Konfrontacja Sztuk Walki, a mixed martial arts promotion based in Poland. 2021 will begin with KSW 58.

== Background ==
Martin Lewandowski announced that KSW has plans studio events for the first 6 months of 2021 due to the COVID-19 pandemic. KSW has plans for a reality TV show. He also announced the plans for a European expansion in 2021.

== List of events ==
#	Event title	Date	Arena	Location
1	KSW 58: Parnasse vs. Torres	January 30, 2021	Wytwórnia Club	Łódź, Poland
2	KSW 59: Fight Code	March 20, 2021	Wytwórnia Club	Łódź, Poland
3	KSW 60: De Fries vs. Narkun 2	April 24, 2021	Wytwórnia Club	Łódź, Poland
4	KSW 61: To Fight or Not To Fight	June 5, 2021	Ergo Arena	Gdańsk, Poland
5	KSW 62: Kołecki vs. Szostak	July 17, 2021	ATM Studio	Warsaw, Poland
6	KSW 63: Crime of The Century	September 11, 2021	ATM Studio	Warsaw, Poland
7	KSW 64: Przybysz vs. Santos	October 23, 2021	Atlas Arena	Łódź, Poland
8	KSW 65: Khalidov vs. Soldić	December 18, 2021	Gliwice Arena	Gliwice, Poland

== KSW 58: Parnasse vs. Torres ==
KSW 58: Parnasse vs. Torres
- Promotion: Konfrontacja Sztuk Walki
- Date: January 30, 2021
- Venue: Wytwórnia Club
- City: Łódź, Poland

Event chronology
KSW 57: De Fries vs. Kita	KSW 58: Parnasse vs. Torres

'KSW 58: Parnasse vs. Torres' was a mixed martial arts event held by Konfrontacja Sztuk Walki January 30, 2021 at the Wytwórnia Club in Łódź, Poland.

=== Background ===
KSW 58 was headlined by a title fight between the KSW Featherweight champion Salahdine Parnasse and the challenger Daniel Torres. In the co-main event, a light heavyweight fight between the Olympic gold medalist Szymon Kolecki and the veteran Martin Zawada.

The card also featured a welterweight bout between Michał Michalski and Mirko cro cop protege Aleksandar Rakas. As well, the former Titan FC Welterweight Champion Uroš Jurišić made his KSW debut against Shamil Musaev who moved up welterweight for this fight.

Former Glory and UFC fighter Guto Inocente made his debut against the former KSW Heavyweight title challenger Michał Andryszak.

Francisco Albano Barrio has face Bartłomiej Kopera in a lightweight bout.

Paweł Polityło has fought Dawid Martynik in the sole bantamweight bout of the card.

The undefeated featherweight prospect Robert Ruchała made his sophomore appearance against the promotional newcomer Danijel Bažant.

Bonus awards

The following fighters were awarded bonuses:

- Fight of the Night: Shamil Musaev vs. Uroš Jurišić
- Knockout of the Night: Daniel Torres
- Submission of the Night: Robert Ruchała

=== Results ===
KSW 58
Weight Class				Method	Round	Time	Notes
Featherweight 66 kg	(Brazil) Daniel Torres	def.	(France) Salahdine Parnasse (c)	KO (Punch)	1	1:47	For the KSW Featherweight Championship
Light Heavyweight 93 kg	(Poland) Szymon Kołecki	def.	(Germany) Martin Zawada	Decision (Unanimous)	3	5:00	
Welterweight 77 kg	(Poland) Michał Michalski	def.	(Croatia) Aleksandar Rakas	TKO (Elbows)	1	4:35	
Welterweight 77 kg	(Russia) Shamil Musaev	def.	(Slovenia) Uroš Jurišić	Decision (Unanimous)	3	5:00	
Heavyweight 120 kg	(Poland) Michał Andryszak	def.	(Brazil) Guto Inocente	Submission (Arm-Triangle Choke)	2	4:07	
Bantamweight 61 kg	(Poland) Paweł Polityło	def.	(Czech Republic) Dawid Martynik	Decision (Unanimous)	3	5:00	
Featherweight 66 kg	(Poland) Robert Ruchała	def.	(Croatia) Danijel Bažant	Submission (Armbar)	3	3:37	
Lightweight 70 kg	(Argentina) Francisco Barrio	def.	(Poland) Bartłomiej Kopera	Decision (Unanimous)	3	5:00	

== KSW 59: Fight Code ==
KSW 59: Fight Code
- Promotion: Konfrontacja Sztuk Walki
- Date: March 20, 2021
- Venue: Wytwórnia Club
- City: Łódź, Poland

'KSW 59: Fight Code' was a mixed martial arts event held by Konfrontacja Sztuk Walki March 20, 2021 at the Wytwórnia Club in Łódź, Poland.

=== Background ===
In the main event of the evening the former World's Strongest Man Mariusz Pudzianowski was set to return after a fifteen month layoff against the undefeated Senegalese heavyweight Serigne Ousmane. However, on the day of the fight, Ousmane Dia suffered an acute appendicitis attack and had to be hospitalized. Stepping in on just a few hours notice was Serbia's Nikola Milanovic.

The event co-headliner featured a rematch, Antun Račić made the second defense of his the KSW Bantamweight title against Sebastian Przybysz. Račić won the first bout at KSW 46 via unanimous decision.

Former FFC Heavyweight champion Darko Stošić returned to heavyweight after an unsuccessful stint in UFC light heavyweight division. In his first fight in KSW the Serbian faced the polish Michał Włodarek.

A middleweight fight between the Olympic medalist Damian Janikowski and the Bellator veteran Jason Radcliffe was part of the event.

Michal Pietrzak faced the 26 year-old prospect Krystian Kaszubowski in a welterweight bout, as well as welterweight bout between Lionel Padilla and the undefeated Adrian Bartosiński,

The Rajewski brothers will be back on the same card. The six-fight KSW veteran Łukasz Rajewski is scheduled to fight the undefeated lightweight Mateusz Legierski, in what will be his sophomore appearance with the organization. Legierski later withdrew from the bout for undisclosed reasons, and was replaced by Konrad Dyrschka. Sebastian Rajewski joins brother on the card as he will fight Savo Lazić in the event opener.

The Opening bout featured a featherweight bout between the debuting Cyprian Wieczorek and Patryk Likus.

Bonus awards

The following fighters were awarded bonuses:

- Fight of the Night: Sebastian Przybysz vs. Antun Račić
- Knockout of the Night: Darko Stošić

=== Results ===
KSW 59
Weight Class				Method	Round	Time	Notes
Openweight	(Poland) Mariusz Pudzianowski	def.	(Serbia) Nikola Milanović	TKO (Punches)	1	1:10	
Bantamweight 61 kg	(Poland) Sebastian Przybysz	def.	(Croatia) Antun Račić (c)	Decision (Unanimous)	5	5:00	For the KSW Bantamweight Championship
Middleweight 84 kg	(Poland) Damian Janikowski	def.	(England) Jason Radcliffe	TKO (Punches)	2	4:41	
Welterweight 77 kg	(Poland) Michał Pietrzak	def.	(Poland) Krystian Kaszubowski	Decision (Split)	3	5:00	
Heavyweight 120 kg	(Serbia) Darko Stošić	def.	(Poland) Michał Włodarek	KO (Punches)	2	4:39	
Lightweight 70 kg	(Poland) Łukasz Rajewski	def.	(Germany) Konrad Dyrschka	Decision (Unanimous)	3	5:00	
Welterweight 77 kg	(Poland) Adrian Bartosiński	def.	(Spain) Lionel Padilla	TKO (Punches)	3	4:05	
Lightweight 70 kg	(Poland) Sebastian Rajewski	def.	(Montenegro) Savo Lazić	Decision (Unanimous)	3	5:00	
Featherweight 66 kg	(Poland) Patryk Likus	def.	(Poland) Cyprian Wieczorek	Decision (Unanimous)	3	5:00	

== KSW 60: De Fries vs. Narkun 2 ==
KSW 60: De Fries vs. Narkun 2
- Promotion: Konfrontacja Sztuk Walki
- Date: April 24, 2021
- Venue: Wytwórnia Club
- City: Łódź, Poland

'KSW 60: De Fries vs. Narkun 2' was a mixed martial arts event held by Konfrontacja Sztuk Walki April 24, 2021 at the Wytwórnia Club in Łódź, Poland.

=== Background ===
The event was headlined by a rematch between Phil De Fries and Tomasz Narkun. The pair previously met on March 23, 2019 in the main event at KSW 47: The X-Warriors, where De Fries defeated Narkun by unanimous decision and defended his KSW heavyweight title.

In the co-main event, the reigning KSW Lightweight champion Marian Ziółkowski was scheduled to make his first title defense against Maciej Kazieczko.

The former boxer Izu Ugonoh was scheduled to make his sophomore MMA appearance against the undefeated heavyweight prospect Thomas Narmo, but Narmo was forced off the card on March 6 with a rib injury. The undefeated German Uğur Özkaplan was set to serve as Narmo's replacement. In turn, Özkaplan was replaced by Marek Samociuk.

Tomasz Jakubiec was scheduled to fight Aleksandar Ilić at middleweight, with both fighters coming off of losses.

Vojto Barborík was scheduled to make his promotional debut against Krzysztof Klaczek.

Ion Surdu and Kacper Koziorzębski were scheduled to fight in an 80 kg catchweight bout.

The opening bout featured a bantamweight fight between Patryk Surdyn and Jakub Wikłacz.

Bonus awards

The following fighters were awarded bonuses:

- Fight of the Night: Patryk Kaczmarczyk vs. Michał Sobiech
- Knockout of the Night: Ion Surdu
- Submission of the Night: Vojto Barborík

=== Results ===
KSW 60
Weight Class				Method	Round	Time	Notes
Heavyweight 120 kg	(England) Phil De Fries (c)	def.	(Poland) Tomasz Narkun	TKO (Punches)	2	3:37	For the KSW Heavyweight Championship
Lightweight 70 kg	(Poland) Marian Ziółkowski (c)	def.	(Poland) Maciej Kazieczko	Submission (Rear-Naked Choke)	2	4:24	For the KSW Lightweight Championship
Heavyweight 120 kg	(Poland) Marek Samociuk	def.	(Poland) Izu Ugonoh	TKO (Punches)	2	0:27	
Featherweight 66 kg	(Poland) Patryk Kaczmarczyk	def.	(Poland) Michał Sobiech	Decision (Unanimous)	3	5:00	
Middleweight 84 kg	(Serbia) Aleksandar Ilić	def.	(Poland) Adrian Dudek	TKO (Head Kick and Punches)	1	3:44	
Featherweight 66 kg	(Slovakia) Vojto Barborík	def.	(Poland) Krzysztof Klaczek	Submission (Rear-Naked Choke)	2	2:30	
W.Strawweight 52 kg	(Poland) Karolina Wójcik	def.	(Poland) Aleksandra Rola	Decision (Unanimous)	3	5:00	
Catchweight 80 kg	(Moldova) Ion Surdu	def.	(Poland) Kacper Koziorzębski	KO (Head Kick)	1	2:19	
Bantamweight 61 kg	(Poland) Jakub Wikłacz	def.	(Poland) Patryk Surdyn	Decision (Unanimous)	3	5:00	

== KSW 61: To Fight or Not To Fight ==
KSW 61: To Fight or Not To Fight
- Promotion: Konfrontacja Sztuk Walki
- Date: June 5, 2021
- Venue: Ergo Arena
- City: Gdańsk, Poland

'KSW 61: To Fight or Not To Fight' was a mixed martial arts event held by Konfrontacja Sztuk Walki June 5, 2021 at the Ergo Arena in Gdańsk, Poland. The event was planned to be held at the Gdańsk Shakespeare Theatre. However, the event was moved to the Ergo Arena in Gdansk. On May 10 it was announced fans will be able to attend the event, KSW 61 will operate at a 50% capacity due to government guidelines.

=== Background ===
The main event featured a heavyweight bout between the former World's Strongest Man Mariusz Pudzianowski and KSW 1 tournament winner Łukasz Jurkowski.

Tomasz Romanowski was scheduled to fight Patrik Kincl in a welterweight bout.

A featherweight bout between Filip Pejić and the former KSW Featherweight champion Salahdine Parnasse was scheduled for the event.

Two former KSW Light-heavyweight title challengers, Przemysław Mysiala and Ivan Erslan, were scheduled to face each other.

Roman Szymański was scheduled to fight Donovan Desmae in a lightweight bout. Adam Niedźwiedź and Jakub Kamieniarz were likewise scheduled to face each other in a lightweight bout.

A heavyweight bout between the former KSW title contender Michal Kita and the UFC veteran Jay Silva was scheduled for the event. Jay Silva later withdrew from the bout, for undisclosed reasons, and was replaced by Darko Stošić.

Karolina Owczarz was scheduled to fight Monika Kucinic at strawweight in the sole WMMA bout of the event.

Bonus awards

The following fighters were awarded bonuses:

- Fight of the Night: Roman Szymański vs. Donovan Desmae
- Knockout of the Night: Darko Stošić
- Submission of the Night: Salahdine Parnasse

=== Results ===
KSW 61
Weight Class				Method	Round	Time	Notes
Heavyweight 120 kg	(Poland) Mariusz Pudzianowski	def.	(Poland) Łukasz Jurkowski	TKO (Punches)	3	1:32	
Featherweight 66 kg	(France) Salahdine Parnasse	def.	(Croatia) Filip Pejić	Submission (Rear-Naked Choke)	2	4:14	
Heavyweight 120 kg	(Serbia) Darko Stošić	def.	(Poland) Michał Kita	TKO (Punches)	1	4:05	
Welterweight 77 kg	(Czech Republic) Patrik Kincl	def.	(Poland) Tomasz Romanowski	TKO (Punches)	2	3:36	
Lightweight 70 kg	(Poland) Roman Szymański	def.	(Belgium) Donovan Desmae	Decision (Unanimous)	3	5:00	
W.Strawweight 52 kg	(Poland) Karolina Owczarz	def.	(Slovenia) Monika Kucinic	Decision (Unanimous)	3	5:00	
Light Heavyweight 93 kg	(Croatia) Ivan Erslan	def.	(Poland) Przemysław Mysiala	TKO (Punches)	1	4:02	
Featherweight 66 kg	(Poland) Damian Stasiak	def.	(Ukraine) Andrey Lezhnev	Submission (Triangle Choke)	1	2:41	
Lightweight 70 kg	(Poland) Adam Niedźwiedź	def.	(Poland) Jakub Kamieniarz	Submission (Arm-Triangle Choke)	2	4:34	

== KSW 62: Kołecki vs. Szostak ==
KSW 62: Kołecki vs. Szostak
- Promotion: Konfrontacja Sztuk Walki
- Date: July 17, 2021
- Venue: ATM studio
- City: Warsaw, Poland

KSW 62: Kołecki vs. Szostak was a mixed martial arts event held by Konfrontacja Sztuk Walki on July 17, 2021 at the ATM studio in Warsaw, Poland.

=== Background ===
The event was headlined by a light heavyweight bout between Szymon Kołecki and Akop Szostak.

Michał Michalski was scheduled to face the undefeated Adrian Bartosiński in a welterweight bout.

Former kickboxer Tomasz Sarara made his mixed martial arts debut against Vladimir Toktasynov. The two of them fought in 2012, under kickboxing rules, with Toktasynov winning by decision.

A lightweight bout between Sebastian Rajewski and the former KSW featherweight champion Artur Sowiński was announced for the event.

One-time bantamweight title challenger Bruno Augusto dos Santos was scheduled to fight Paweł Polityka.

A bantamweight bout between David Martinik and Lemmy Krušič was announced for the event.

Bonus awards

The following fighters were awarded bonuses:

- Fight of the Night: Sebastian Rajewski vs. Artur Sowiński
- Knockout of the Night: Andrzej Grzebyk
- Submission of the Night: Lom-Ali Eskijew

=== Results ===
KSW 62
Weight Class				Method	Round	Time	Notes
Light Heavyweight 93 kg	(Poland) Szymon Kołecki	def.	(Poland) Akop Szostak	KO (Punch)	1	0:47	
Welterweight 77 kg	(Poland) Andrzej Grzebyk	def.	(Lithuania) Marius Žaromskis	KO (Punches)	1	2:11	
Welterweight 77 kg	(Poland) Adrian Bartosiński	def.	(Poland) Michał Michalski	TKO (Punches)	1	1:53	
Heavyweight 93 kg	(Poland) Tomasz Sarara	def.	(Croatia) Filip Bradaric	TKO (Retirement)	3	1:51	
Lightweight 70 kg	(Poland) Sebastian Rajewski	def.	(Poland) Artur Sowiński	Decision (Split)	3	5:00	
Bantamweight 61 kg	(Brazil) Bruno Augusto dos Santos	def.	(Poland) Paweł Polityło	Decision (Unanimous)	3	5:00	
Featherweight 66 kg	(Germany) Lom-Ali Eskijew	def.	(Colombia) Gilber Ordoñez Huila	Submission (Arm-Triangle Choke)	1	4:25	
Middleweight 84 kg	(Poland) Marcin Krakowiak	def.	(Poland) Borys Borkowski	TKO (Slam)	1	1:02	
Bantamweight 61 kg	(Czech Republic) David Martinik	def.	(Slovenia) Lemmy Krušič	TKO (Punches)	1	2:45	

== KSW 63: Crime of The Century ==
KSW 63: Crime of The Century
- Promotion: Konfrontacja Sztuk Walki
- Date: September 4, 2021
- Venue: ATM studio
- City: Warsaw, Poland

KSW 63: Crime of The Century was a mixed martial arts event held by Konfrontacja Sztuk Walki on September 4, 2021 at the ATM studio in Warsaw, Poland.

=== Background ===
The event will feature a title fight between the reigning KSW Welterweight champion Roberto Soldić and the challenger Patrik Kincl as the event headliner.

The co-main event will feature Greco-Roman Olympic bronze medalist wrestler Damian Janikowski and the former UFC fighter Paweł Pawlak who makes his KSW debut.

The heavyweight contender Darko Stošić will fight against Michał Andryszak at the event.

Also, a two Croatian bout is scheduled for the event. First, the former KSW Bantamweight champion Antun Račić is scheduled to face Jakub Wikłacz in a bantamweight bout and in an 80 kg catchweight bout between Aleksandar Rakas will face Tomasz Romanowski.

Two women's flyweight bouts were scheduled for the event. First, Emilia Czerwińska would face Weronika Esze, while Sara Luzar Smajić would face Aitana Alvarez.

The bout between Armen Stepanyan and Michał Domin will serve as the opening fight.

Bonus awards

The following fighters were awarded bonuses:

- Fight of the Night: Paweł Pawlak vs. Damian Janikowski
- Submission of the Night: Jakub Wikłacz
- Knockout of the Night: Tomasz Romanowski

=== Results ===
KSW 63
Weight Class				Method	Round	Time	Notes
Welterweight 77 kg	(Croatia) Roberto Soldić (c)	def.	(Czech Republic) Patrik Kincl	TKO (Punches)	3	2:55	For the KSW Welterweight Championship
Middleweight 84 kg	(Poland) Paweł Pawlak	def.	(Poland) Damian Janikowski	Decision (Unanimous)	3	5:00	
Heavyweight 120 kg	(Serbia) Darko Stošić	def.	(Poland) Michał Andryszak	Decision (Split)	3	5:00	
Bantamweight 61 kg	(Poland) Jakub Wikłacz	def.	(Croatia) Antun Račić	Submission (Rear-Naked Choke)	1	1:57	
Catchweight 80 kg	(Poland) Tomasz Romanowski	def.	(Croatia) Aleksandar Rakas	KO (Punches)	1	1:59	
W.Flyweight 57 kg	(Poland) Emilia Czerwińska	def.	(Poland) Weronika Eszer	TKO (Punches)	2	3:50	
Light Heavyweight 93 kg	(Poland) Damian Piwowarczyk	def.	(Poland) Marcin Trzciński	Submission (Rear-Naked Choke)	2	2:06	
W.Flyweight 57 kg	(Croatia) Sara Luzar Smajić	def.	(Spain) Aitana Alvarez	Decision (Unanimous)	3	5:00	
Featherweight 65 kg	(Poland) Michał Domin	def.	(Poland) Szymon Karolczyk	Decision (Unanimous)	3	5:00	

== KSW 64: Przybysz vs. Santos ==
KSW 64: Przybysz vs. Santos
- Promotion: Konfrontacja Sztuk Walki
- Date: October 23, 2021
- Venue: Atlas Arena
- City: Łódź, Poland

KSW 64: Przybysz vs. Santos was a mixed martial arts event held by Konfrontacja Sztuk Walki on October 23, 2021 at the Atlas Arena in Łódź, Poland.

=== Background ===
A bantamweight title fight between the reigning champion Sebastian Przybysz and challenger Bruno Augusto dos Santos was announced as the main event.

A heavyweight bout between Serigne Ousmane Dia and five-time World's Strongest Man titlist Mariusz Pudzianowski was scheduled as the co-main event. The two were originally set to fight at KSW 59, before Dia withdrew.

KSW veteran Filip Pejić was scheduled to face promotional newcomer Daniel Rutkowski in a featherweight bout.

A featherweight bout between Robert Ruchała and Patryk Kaczmarczyk was announced for the event. The two of them fought as amateurs, at Thunderstrike Fight League 15 on October 20, 2018, with Kaczmarczyk winning by unanimous decision.

A welterweight bout between Michał Pietrzak and Shamil Musaev was scheduled for the event.

Two middleweight bouts were announced for the event: Cezary Kęsik was scheduled to face Marcin Krakowiak, while Albert Odzimkowski was scheduled to face Jason Radcliffe.

A women's flyweight bout between Karolina Owczarz and Sylwia Juśkiewicz was scheduled for the event.

Bonus awards

The following fighters were awarded bonuses:

- Fight of the Night: Cezary Kęsik vs. Marcin Krakowiak
- Submission of the Night: Sebastian Przybysz
- Knockout of the Night: Daniel Rutkowski

=== Results ===
KSW 64
Weight Class				Method	Round	Time	Notes
Bantamweight 61 kg	(Poland) Sebastian Przybysz (c)	def.	(Brazil) Bruno Augusto dos Santos	Submission (Inverted Triangle Choke)	3	4:20	For the KSW Bantamweight Championship
Openweight	(Poland) Mariusz Pudzianowski	def.	(Senegal) Serigne Ousmane Dia	KO (Punch)	1	0:18	
Featherweight 66 kg	(Poland) Daniel Rutkowski	def.	(Croatia) Filip Pejić	KO (High Kick)	1	1:22	
Featherweight 66 kg	(Poland) Robert Ruchała	def.	(Poland) Patryk Kaczmarczyk	Decision (Unanimous)	3	5:00	
Welterweight 77 kg	(Poland) Michał Pietrzak	-	(Russia) Shamil Musaev	Draw (Majority)	3	5:00	
W.Flyweight 57 kg	(Poland) Sylwia Juśkiewicz	def.	(Poland) Karolina Owczarz	Decision (Unanimous)	3	5:00	
Middleweight 84 kg	(Poland) Cezary Kęsik	def.	(Poland) Marcin Krakowiak	TKO (Punches)	3	0:17	
Middleweight 84 kg	(England) Jason Radcliffe	def.	(Poland) Albert Odzimkowski	TKO (Punches)	1	3:44	
Light Heavyweight 93 kg	(France) Oumar Sy	def.	(Poland) Adam Tomasik	TKO (Punches)	1	1:22	

== KSW 65: Khalidov vs. Soldić ==
KSW 65: Khalidov vs. Soldić
- Promotion: Konfrontacja Sztuk Walki
- Date: December 18, 2021
- Venue: Gliwice Arena
- City: Gliwice, Poland

Event chronology
KSW 65: Khalidov vs. Soldić	KSW 66

KSW 65: Khalidov vs. Soldić was a mixed martial arts event held by Konfrontacja Sztuk Walki on December 18, 2021 at Gliwice Arena in Gliwice, Poland.

=== Background ===
The event featured two title fights, first a KSW Middleweight Championship bout between the reigning champion Mamed Khalidov and the KSW Welterweight Champion Roberto Soldić as the event headliner. Secondly, a rematch for the KSW Featherweight Championship between the champion Daniel Torres and the former Champion Salahdine Parnasse as the event co-headliner. Daniel Torres came in at 146 pounds, a pound over championship weight and was stripped of the title, only Parnasse was able to win the belt.

On December 5, it was announced that Ion Surdu had suffered an injury in training and was pulling out of his bout with Adam Niedźwiedź. Surdu was replaced by Miroslav Brož against Niedźwiedź.

A featherweight bout between Patryk Likus and Luke Santarelli was expected to take place at this event. On December 10, Santarelli withdrew due to an injury and was replaced by Alexander Lööf. However, in turn, Lööf has to withdraw on December 16, he was replaced by Hassan Shaaban who steps in on just a few days notice to make his KSW debut against Likus. Hassan Shaaban in turn missed weight and was replaced by Piotr Olszynka.

Bonus awards

The following fighters were awarded bonuses:

- Fight of the Night: Lom Ali Eskiev vs. Damian Stasiak
- Submission of the Night: Damian Piwowarczyk
- Knockout of the Night: Patryk Likus, Roberto Soldić

=== Results ===
KSW 65
Weight Class				Method	Round	Time	Notes
Middleweight 84 kg	(Croatia) Roberto Soldić	def.	(Poland) Mamed Khalidov (c)	KO (Punches)	2	3:40	For the KSW Middleweight Championship
Featherweight 66 kg	(France) Salahdine Parnasse	def.	(Brazil) Daniel Torres	Decision (Unanimous)	5	5:00	For the vacant KSW Featherweight Championship
Featherweight 66 kg	(Germany) Lom-Ali Eskijew	def.	(Poland) Damian Stasiak	Decision (Unanimous)	3	5:00	
Lightweight 70 kg	(Poland) Roman Szymański	def.	(Poland) Mateusz Legierski	TKO (Punches)	2	4:47	
Heavyweight 120 kg	(Poland) Michał Kita	def.	(Poland) Marek Samociuk	TKO (Punches)	1	3:22	
Catchweight 79.5 kg	(Poland) Adam Niedźwiedź	-	(Czech Republic) Miroslav Brož	Draw (Majority)	3	5:00	
Light Heavyweight 93 kg	(Poland) Damian Piwowarczyk	def.	(Germany) Marc Doussis	Submission (Triangle Armbar)	2	2:22	
W.Strawweight 52 kg	(Poland) Anita Bekus	def.	(Czech Republic) Magdaléna Šormová	Decision (Unanimous)	3	5:00	
Catchweight 68 kg	(Poland) Patryk Likus	def.	(Poland) Piotr Olszynka	KO (Spinning Back Elbow)	2	4:59	
Bantamweight 61 kg	(Poland) Shamad Erzanukaev	def.	(Poland) Bartosz Rewera	Decision (Unanimous)	3	5:00	

== See also ==
- List of current KSW fighters
- 2021 in UFC
- 2021 in Bellator MMA
- 2021 in ONE Championship
- 2021 in Absolute Championship Akhmat
- 2021 in Rizin Fighting Federation
- 2021 in Legacy Fighting Alliance
- 2021 in RXF
