= Scott Askham =

English mixed martial arts fighter

- Born: 20 May 1988 (age 38); West Yorkshire, England
- Nationality: English
- Height: 6 ft 3 in (1.91 m)
- Weight: 186 lb (84 kg; 13.3 st)
- Division: Middleweight
- Reach: 75 in (190 cm)
- Stance: Southpaw
- Fighting out of: Doncaster, England
- Team: American Top Team (2017–present)
- Rank: Black belt in Brazilian Jiu-Jitsu under Victor Estima
- Years active: 2010–present

Mixed martial arts record
- Total: 27
- Wins: 20
- By knockout: 12
- By submission: 2
- By decision: 6
- Losses: 7
- By knockout: 2
- By decision: 5

Other information
- Mixed martial arts record from Sherdog
- Last updated on: 3 July 2015

Scott Askham (born 20 May 1988) is an English mixed martial artist currently competing in the Middleweight division of Oktagon MMA. A professional since 2010, he has also competed for the UFC, Konfrontacja Sztuk Walki (KSW), Absolute Championship Berkut, BAMMA, and Cage Warriors.

== Background ==
Born and raised in West Yorkshire, Askham began training in mixed martial arts as a teenager and took part in several amateur fights before turning professional in 2010. During this time, he also worked with a maintenance company installing street lighting.

== Mixed martial arts career ==
=== Early career ===
Prior to his professional career, Askham held an amateur MMA record of 3–0. He made his professional debut competing as a middleweight for various regional promotions across Great Britain, including stints in Cage Warriors and BAMMA. He was able to compile an undefeated record of 12–0 along the way, finishing a large portion of his fights in the first round.

After his TKO stoppage of Max Nunes in June 2014, Askham signed with the UFC.

=== Ultimate Fighting Championship ===
Askham made his promotional debut on 4 October 2014 as he faced Magnus Cedenblad at UFC Fight Night 53. Despite dropping Cedenblad with a front kick in round two, Askham was controlled through the rest of the fight, and was defeated via unanimous decision.

Askham next faced Antonio dos Santos Jr. on 20 June 2015 at UFC Fight Night 69. Askham won the fight via KO in the first round.

Askham faced Krzysztof Jotko on 24 October 2015 at UFC Fight Night 76. He lost the fight by split decision.

Askham faced Chris Dempsey on 27 February 2016 at UFC Fight Night 84. He won the fight via knockout in the first round. He was also awarded a Performance of the Night bonus.

Askham was briefly scheduled to face Anthony Smith on 8 July 2016 at The Ultimate Fighter 23 Finale. However, Askham pulled out of the bout on 28 April and was replaced by Cezar Ferreira.

Following a quick recovery, Askham was rescheduled to face promotional newcomer Jack Hermansson on 3 September 2016 at UFC Fight Night 93. He lost the fight by unanimous decision.

Askham faced Brad Scott on 18 March 2017 at UFC Fight Night 107. He lost the fight by split decision and was subsequently released from the promotion.

=== Konfrontacja Sztuk Walki ===
Askham fought fellow British UFC veteran Luke Barnatt on 23 September 2017 in the main event at ACB 70. He won the fight by split decision.

On 10 December 2017 Askham revealed a three-fight contract with KSW. As the first fight of his contract and promotional debut, Askham faced former KSW Middleweight Champion Michał Materla at KSW 42: Khalidov vs. Narkun on 3 March 2018. Askham won the fight via technical knockout stemming from a body kick. He also won the Knockout of the Night bonus.

As the second fight and the semifinal of KSW Middleweight tournament, Askham faced Marcin Wójcik at KSW 45: The Return to Wembley on 6 October 2018. Askham won the fight via body kick and punches, winning his second Knockout of the Night bonus in the organization.

In the final fight of his contract Askham fought in the KSW Middleweight Tournament Final, winning a rematch against Michał Materla via flying knee knockout and becoming the KSW Middleweight Champion.

Askham faced Mamed Khalidov in a catchweight bout at KSW 52 on 7 December 2019. He won the bout via unanimous decision.

Askham was scheduled to defend his KSW Middleweight Championship in a rematch against Mamed Khalidov at KSW 55: Askham vs. Khalidov 2 on 10 October 2020. He lost the fight via first-minute knockout.

Askham faced Mamed Khalidov in trilogy at XTB KSW 83: Colosseum 2 on 3 June 2023. He lost the bout in the third round after Khalidov hit him with flying switch kick and finished him with punches.

=== Oktagon MMA ===
Askham made his Oktagon MMA debut on 4 November 2023 against Marc Doussis at Oktagon 48, defeating him via unanimous decision.

On September 21, 2024 he made his return at Oktagon 61 to face former UFC competitor Makhmud Muradov. He lost the fight by unanimous decision.

== Championships and accomplishments ==
=== Mixed martial arts ===
- Ultimate Fighting Championship
  - Performance of the Night (One time) vs. Chris Dempsey
- Absolute Championship Berkut
  - Fight of the Night (One time) vs. Luke Barnatt
- Konfrontacja Sztuk Walki
  - KSW Middleweight Championship (One time)
  - 2019 KSW Middleweight tournament winner.
  - Fight of the Night (One time) vs. Michał Materla
  - Knockout of the Night (Two times) vs. Michał Materla, Marcin Wójcik
- BAMMA
  - BAMMA Middleweight Championship (One time)
  - One successful title defense
- Ultimate Cage FC
  - UCFC Middleweight Championship (One time)

== Mixed martial arts record ==
Professional record breakdown
27 matches	20 wins	7 losses
By knockout	12	2
By submission	2	0
By decision	6	5

Res.	Record	Opponent	Method	Event	Date	Round	Time	Location	Notes
Loss	20–7	Makhmud Muradov	Decision (unanimous)	Oktagon 61	September 21, 2024	3	5:00	Brno, Czech Republic	Return to Middleweight.
Win	20–6	Marc Doussis	Decision (unanimous)	Oktagon 48	November 4, 2023	3	5:00	Manchester, England	Light Heavyweight debut.
Loss	19–6	Mamed Khalidov	KO (flying switch kick and punches)	KSW 83: Colosseum 2	June 3, 2023	3	1:03	Warsaw, Poland	
Loss	19–5	Mamed Khalidov	KO (flying switch kick)	KSW 55: Askham vs. Khalidov 2	October 10, 2020	1	0:36	Łódź, Poland	Lost the KSW Middleweight Championship.
Win	19–4	Mamed Khalidov	Decision (unanimous)	KSW 52: Race	December 7, 2019	3	5:00	Gliwice, Poland	Catchweight (187 lb) bout.
Win	18–4	Michał Materla	KO (flying knee)	KSW 49: Soldić vs. Kaszubowski	May 18, 2019	3	1:23	Gdańsk, Poland	Won the KSW Middleweight Tournament and the vacant KSW Middleweight Championship. Fight of the Night.
Win	17–4	Marcin Wójcik	KO (kick to the body and punches)	KSW 45: The Return to Wembley	October 6, 2018	1	1:37	London, England	KSW Middleweight Tournament Semifinal. Knockout of the Night.
Win	16–4	Michał Materla	TKO (kick to the body)	KSW 42: Khalidov vs. Narkun	March 3, 2018	1	1:09	Łódź, Poland	Knockout of the Night.
Win	15–4	Luke Barnatt	Decision (split)	ACB 70: The Battle of Britain	September 23, 2017	3	5:00	Sheffield, England	Fight of the Night.
Loss	14–4	Brad Scott	Decision (split)	UFC Fight Night: Manuwa vs. Anderson	March 18, 2017	3	5:00	London, England	
Loss	14–3	Jack Hermansson	Decision (unanimous)	UFC Fight Night: Arlovski vs. Barnett	September 3, 2016	3	5:00	Hamburg, Germany	
Win	14–2	Chris Dempsey	TKO (punch and head kick)	UFC Fight Night: Silva vs. Bisping	February 27, 2016	1	4:45	London, England	Performance of the Night.
Loss	13–2	Krzysztof Jotko	Decision (split)	UFC Fight Night: Holohan vs. Smolka	October 24, 2015	3	5:00	Dublin, Ireland	
Win	13–1	Antônio dos Santos Jr.	KO (knees)	UFC Fight Night: Jędrzejczyk vs. Penne	June 20, 2015	1	2:52	Berlin, Germany	
Loss	12–1	Magnus Cedenblad	Decision (unanimous)	UFC Fight Night: Nelson vs. Story	October 4, 2014	3	5:00	Stockholm, Sweden	
Win	12–0	Max Nunes	TKO (punches)	BAMMA Fight Night: Southampton	June 7, 2014	3	1:50	Southampton, England	Defended the BAMMA World Middleweight Championship.
Win	11–0	Jorge Luis Bezerra	Decision (unanimous)	BAMMA 13	September 14, 2013	3	5:00	Birmingham, England	Won the vacant BAMMA World Middleweight Championship.
Win	10–0	Jack Marshman	Decision (unanimous)	Ultimate Cage FC 5	July 27, 2013	3	5:00	Doncaster, England	Won the UCFC Middleweight Championship.
Win	9–0	Henry McLeman	Submission (rear-naked choke)	BAMMA 12	9 March 2013	3	4:13	Newcastle, England	
Win	8–0	Denniston Sutherland	Decision (unanimous)	Cage Warriors 50	December 8, 2012	3	5:00	Glasgow, Scotland	
Win	7–0	Dai Cook	KO (head kick and punches)	Caged Steel FC 3	October 6, 2012	1	0:35	Doncaster, England	
Win	6–0	Mark Jones	TKO (punches)	Ultimate Cage FC 4	August 18, 2012	1	0:35	Batley, England	
Win	5–0	Aurelijus Kerpe	Submission (rear-naked choke)	Caged Steel FC 2	May 19, 2012	1	2:04	Doncaster, England	
Win	4–0	Matt Earnshaw	TKO (punches)	Caged Steel FC 1	December 3, 2011	1	N/A	Doncaster, England	
Win	3–0	Arunas Klimavicius	TKO (punches)	Olympian MMA Championship 11	September 3, 2011	1	0:24	Liverpool, England	
Win	2–0	Shaun Lomas	KO (head kick)	Fight Pro UK 3	March 11, 2011	1	0:04	Barnsley, England	
Win	1–0	Rolandas Cizauskas	TKO (punches)	British Cage FC: Barnsley	October 1, 2010	1	N/A	Barnsley, England	Middleweight debut.

== Amateur mixed martial arts record ==
Amateur record breakdown		
6 matches	6 wins	0 losses
By knockout	1	0
By submission	1	0
By decision	4	0

Res.	Record	Opponent	Method	Event	Date	Round	Time	Location	Notes
Win	6–0	Dan Abbott	Decision (unanimous)	Fight-Stars 4	27 June 2010	2	5:00	Wrexham, Wales	
Win	5–0	Avi Jack	Decision (split)	Fight-Pro UK: Barnsley Fight Night 2	20 February 2010	3	5:00	Barnsley, England	
Win	4–0	Sam Boult	Decision (majority)	Fight-Pro UK: Barnsley Fight Night 1	16 October 2009	3	5:00	Barnsley, England	
Win	3–0	Qasim Shafiq	Decision (unanimous)	Phoenix Fight Promotions: D-Day	7 March 2009	3	5:00	Rotherham, England	
Win	2–0	Dan Edwards	TKO (body kick)	Ultimate Force: Nemesis	1 November 2008	1	2:48	Doncaster, England	
Win	1–0	Johnny Stuart	Submission (arm-triange choke)	Phoenix Fight Promotions: Elimination	27 September 2008	1	4:15	Rotherham, England	

== See also ==
- List of male mixed martial artists
