= Damian Stasiak =

Polish mixed martial arts fighter

- Born: February 20, 1990 (age 36); Zgierz, Poland
- Other names: Webster
- Nationality: Polish
- Height: 5 ft 5 in (1.65 m)
- Weight: 135 lb (61 kg; 9.6 st)
- Division: Bantamweight; Featherweight
- Reach: 70 in (178 cm)
- Fighting out of: Łódź, Poland
- Team: United Gym
- Rank: Black belt in karate Brown belt in Brazilian Jiu-Jitsu
- Years active: 2011–present

Mixed martial arts record
- Total: 25
- Wins: 15
- By knockout: 1
- By submission: 11
- By decision: 3
- Losses: 10
- By knockout: 2
- By decision: 8

Other information
- Mixed martial arts record from Sherdog

Damian Stasiak (born February 20, 1990) is a Polish former mixed martial artist recently competing in the Featherweight division of the Konfrontacja Sztuk Walki (KSW). A professional competitor since 2011, he formerly competed for the Ultimate Fighting Championship (UFC), M-1 Global, BAMMA, and Absolute Championship Berkut. He was ranked #7 in the KSW Featherweight rankings at the day of his retirement bout.

== Background ==
Stasiak began training in karate at the age of six, later earning his black belt (International Traditional Karate Federation), and won multiple World Championships in individual Kumite. Stasiak is also accomplished in Brazilian jiu-jitsu, holding the rank of brown belt.

== Mixed martial arts career ==
=== Early career ===
Stasiak made his professional debut in November 2011 where he competed primarily in regional promotions across the Eastern Europe, including stints in M-1 Global and BAMMA, where he compiled a record of 8—2 before signing with the UFC in the spring of 2015.

=== Ultimate Fighting Championship ===
He made his debut against Yaotzin Meza at UFC Fight Night 64 on April 11, 2014. He lost the back and forth fight by unanimous decision.

Stasiak was briefly linked to a fight with Erik Pérez on November 21, 2015, at The Ultimate Fighter Latin America 2 Finale. However, Stasiak was removed from the bout for undisclosed reasons in mid-October and was replaced by Taylor Lapilus.

Stasiak next faced Filip Pejić on April 10, 2016, at UFC Fight Night 86. He won the fight via submission in the first round.

Stasiak faced Davey Grant on October 8, 2016, at UFC 204. He won the fight via submission in the third round.

Stasiak faced Pedro Munhoz on May 28, 2017, at UFC Fight Night 109. He lost the fight by unanimous decision.

Stasiak faced Brian Kelleher on October 21, 2017, at UFC Fight Night 118. He lost the fight via technical knockout in the third round. This fight earned him the Fight of the Night award.

Stasiak met promotional newcomer Liu Pingyuan on July 22, 2018, at UFC Fight Night 134. He lost the fight via unanimous decision.

Stasiak was released by the UFC in September 2018.

=== KSW ===
After one victory in the regional circuit, Stasiak signed with KSW and faced Antun Račić for the inaugural KSW Bantamweight Championship at KSW 51 on November 9, 2019. Stasiak lost the grappling-heavy contest via unanimous decision.

Stasiak made his sophomore appearance in the organization against Patryk Surdyn at KSW 55 on October 10, 2020. He won the fight via second-round submission.

Stasiak returned to featherweight and faced Andrey Lezhnev on June 5, 2021, at KSW 61. He submitted Lezhnev in the first round via triangle choke.

Stasiak faced Lom-Ali Eskijew on December 18, 2021, at KSW 65: Khalidov vs. Soldić. He lost the bout via unanimous decision.

Stasiak faced Robert Ruchała on October 14, 2022, at KSW 75: Ruchała vs. Stasiak. He lost the close bout via split decision.

Stasiak faced Pascal Hintzen on July 15, 2023, at KSW 84: De Fries vs. Bajor. He won the bout via triangle choke in the first round.

Stasiak faced Adam Soldaev on January 20, 2024 at KSW 90: Wrzosek vs. Vitasović, getting knocked out in the second round.

Stasiak faced Michał Domin in his retirement fight on June 14, 2025 at KSW 107: De Fries vs Wrzosek. He won the fight via unanimous decision. After the fight he announced his retirement.

== Championships and accomplishments ==
- Ultimate Fighting Championship
  - Fight of the Night (One time) vs. Brian Kelleher

== Mixed martial arts record ==
Professional record breakdown
25 matches	15 wins	10 losses
By knockout	1	2
By submission	11	0
By decision	3	8

Res.	Record	Opponent	Method	Event	Date	Round	Time	Location	Notes
Win	15–10	Michał Domin	Decision (unanimous)	KSW 107	June 14, 2025	3	5:00	Gdańsk, Poland	Retirement Fight.
Loss	14–10	Adam Soldaev	KO (punch)	KSW 90	January 20, 2024	2	1:08	Warsaw, Poland	
Win	14–9	Pascal Hintzen	Submission (triangle choke)	KSW 84	July 15, 2023	1	2:50	Gdynia, Poland	Submission of the Night.
Loss	13–9	Robert Ruchała	Decision (split)	KSW 75	October 14, 2022	3	5:00	Nowy Sącz, Poland	Fight of the Night.
Loss	13–8	Lom-Ali Eskiev	Decision (unanimous)	KSW 65	December 18, 2021	3	5:00	Gliwice, Poland	Fight of the Night.
Win	13–7	Andrey Lezhnev	Submission (triangle choke)	KSW 61	June 5, 2021	1	2:41	Gdańsk, Poland	Return to Featherweight.
Win	12–7	Patryk Surdyn	Technical Submission (arm-triangle choke)	KSW 55	October 10, 2020	2	4:17	Łódź, Poland	Submission of the Night.
Loss	11–7	Antun Račić	Decision (unanimous)	KSW 51	November 9, 2019	5	5:00	Zagreb, Croatia	For the inaugural KSW Bantamweight Championship.
Win	11–6	Nikolay Kondratuk	Technical Submission (arm-triangle choke)	Rocky Warriors Cartel 2	April 13, 2019	1	1:52	Golina, Poland	Featherweight bout.
Loss	10–6	Liu Pingyuan	Decision (unanimous)	UFC Fight Night: Shogun vs. Smith	July 22, 2018	3	5:00	Hamburg, Germany	
Loss	10–5	Brian Kelleher	TKO (punches)	UFC Fight Night: Cowboy vs. Till	October 21, 2017	3	3:39	Gdańsk, Poland	Fight of the Night.
Loss	10–4	Pedro Munhoz	Decision (unanimous)	UFC Fight Night: Gustafsson vs. Teixeira	May 28, 2017	3	5:00	Stockholm, Sweden	
Win	10–3	Davey Grant	Submission (armbar)	UFC 204	October 8, 2016	3	3:56	Manchester, England	
Win	9–3	Filip Pejić	Submission (rear-naked choke)	UFC Fight Night: Rothwell vs. dos Santos	April 10, 2016	1	2:16	Zagreb, Croatia	Bantamweight debut.
Loss	8–3	Yaotzin Meza	Decision (unanimous)	UFC Fight Night: Gonzaga vs. Cro Cop 2	April 11, 2015	3	5:00	Kraków, Poland	
Win	8–2	Mike Grundy	Submission (triangle choke)	BAMMA 19	March 28, 2015	2	4:18	Blackpool, England	
Win	7–2	Kamil Selwa	Submission (rear-naked choke)	ACB 13	January 31, 2015	1	3:42	Płock, Poland	
Win	6–2	Łukasz Grochowski	Decision (unanimous)	Extreme Fight Cage 1	January 25, 2014	3	5:00	Ełk, Poland	Won the 3F Featherweight Tournament.
Win	5–2	Konrad Sokulski	Submission (rear-naked choke)	Extreme Fight Cage 1	January 25, 2014	2	2:31	Ełk, Poland	3F Featherweight Tournament Semifinal.
Win	4–2	Tomasz Boduszek	Submission (rear-naked choke)	Extreme Fight Cage 1	January 25, 2014	1	1:32	Ełk, Poland	Return to Featherweight. 3F Featherweight Tournament Quarterfinal.
Loss	3–2	Dmitry Silnyagin	Decision (unanimous)	Rod Fighting: Overtime Cup 2013	April 27, 2013	3	5:00	Moscow, Russia	Lightweight debut.
Loss	3–1	Magomed Magomedov	Decision (unanimous)	M-1 Challenge 37	February 27, 2013	3	5:00	Orenburg, Russia	
Win	3–0	Krzysztof Klaczek	Decision (unanimous)	PMMAF: Finals	November 5, 2011	2	5:00	Chorzów, Poland	
Win	2–0	Pawel Chwalinski	Submission (rear-naked choke)	PMMAF: Finals	November 5, 2011	1	4:15	Chorzów, Poland	
Win	1–0	Marcin Moskiewski	KO (punch)	PMMAF: Finals	November 5, 2011	2	2:52	Chorzów, Poland	Featherweight debut.

== See also ==
- List of current KSW fighters
- List of male mixed martial artists
