= Roberto Soldić =

Croatian boxer and mixed martial artist

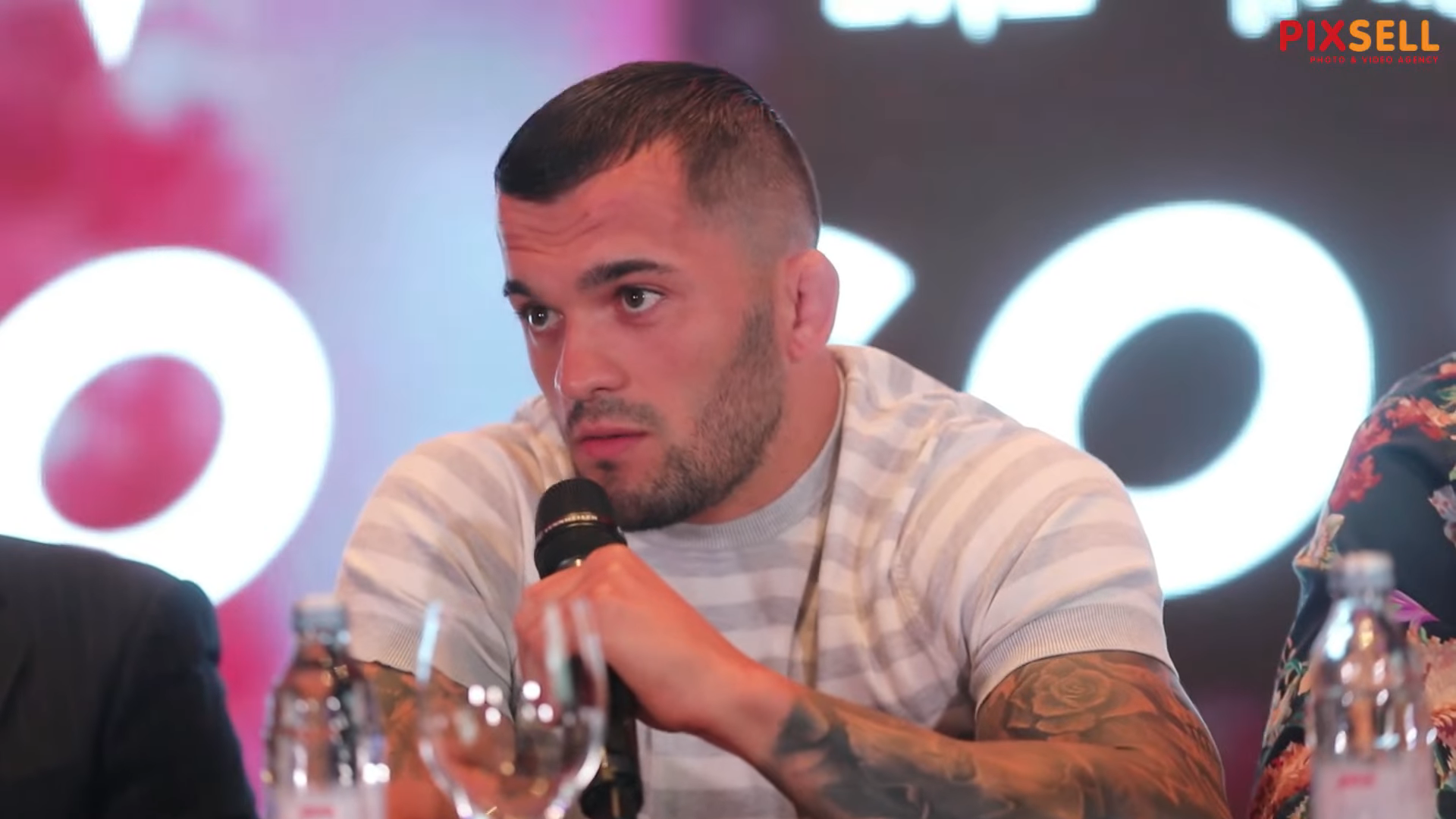
- Born: Roberto Soldić; 25 January 1995 (age 31); Vitez, Bosnia and Herzegovina
- Other names: Robocop
- Nationality: Croatian
- Height: 5 ft 10 in (1.78 m)
- Weight: 185 lb (84 kg; 13.2 st)
- Division: Welterweight (MMA); Middleweight (MMA); Light Heavyweight (Boxing)
- Reach: 73.5 in (187 cm)
- Fighting out of: Düsseldorf, Germany
- Team: UFD Gym Düsseldorf
- Years active: 2014–present

Professional boxing record
- Total: 4
- Wins: 4
- By knockout: 4
- Losses: 0

Mixed martial arts record
- Total: 27
- Wins: 22
- By knockout: 18
- By submission: 1
- By decision: 3
- Losses: 4
- By knockout: 2
- By decision: 2
- No contests: 1

Other information
- Mixed martial arts record from Sherdog

Roberto Soldić (Croatian pronunciation: [roberto soldiɕ]; born 25 January 1995) is a Croatian mixed martial artist and professional boxer who is currently competing in the Welterweight division of the Ultimate Fighting Championship (UFC). He formerly competed in KSW, where he was the promotion’s two time Welterweight and one time Middleweight champion, holding both the belts until his signing to ONE. He also competed in FFC, where he was the Welterweight Champion, and in Superior FC, where he was also their Welterweight champion.

Soldić is a member of University of Fighting Gym Düsseldorf from Düsseldorf, Germany, where he trains under the tutelage of the gym's owner and manager Ivan Dijaković.

== Background ==
Soldić was born to Croat parents in Vitez, Bosnia and Herzegovina. While at school, Soldić played soccer before joining a local judo gym in Vitez. Soldić soon realized that he preferred martial arts and he decided to dedicate himself to judo and followed by mixed martial arts (MMA). Given that there were no adequate conditions for training in his hometown of Vitez, Soldić improvised and trained at various gyms in Bosnia and Herzegovina and Croatia. In 2015, Soldić met his current coach and manager Ivan Dijaković. That same year, Soldić moved to Düsseldorf, Germany, and started training at UFD Gym Düsseldorf, where he was able to completely dedicate himself to the sport. In the following two years and Soldić started to be considered as one of the biggest European MMA prospects.

== Mixed martial arts career ==
=== Early career ===
Soldić made his MMA debut 19 September 2014 at AFC 3: Arti Fighting Championship 3 in Ljubuški, Bosnia and Herzegovina in the lightweight division against Ante Alilović. He won via TKO in the second round (2:50). In the same year, he scored another win when he defeated Mladen Ponjević via submission (guillotine choke) in the first round (00:35) at a MMA event in Metković, Croatia.

=== Serbian Battle Championship ===
Roberto Soldić scored his first major win and attracted local media attention at Serbian Battle Championship: SBC 5 in May 2015 in Odžaci, Serbia, where he fought Vladimir Prodanović. He defeated Prodanović via TKO in the second round (1:30). About a year later, Soldić became SBC lightweight champion. He won the title at SBC 8 that took place 5 March 2016 in Sombor, Serbia, when he defeated experienced Montenegrin fighter Vaso Bakočević via TKO in the third round.

In his third SBC match at SBC 14 that took place 8 July 2017 in Bačka Palanka, Serbia, Soldić defeated Slobodan Vukić from Bosnia and Herzegovina via KO in the first round (1:04) in a non-title bout.

Soldić suffered his first professional setback at MFC 3: Montenegro Fighting Championship 3, that took place in Budva, Montenegro, 27 July 2015. He lost to Marko Radaković via unanimous decision. After two rounds, judges decided in favor of Radaković which caused upset in regional MMA circles and media which claimed that Soldić scored more points. His coaches also revealed to the media that the organizers made last-minute changes to the rules, since the match was initially set for three rounds. Roberto Soldić won his second MMA title at SMMAC: Swiss MMA Championship 4 that took place 1 October 2016 in Basel, Switzerland. In a welterweight title bout that also served as the main event, Soldić defeated Pascal Kloser via TKO in the first round (1:34). This bout was the beginning of his winning streak and the hype of being the biggest fighting sports prospect from Southeast Europe.

=== Final Fight Championship ===
Immediately after winning the SMMAC belt, Soldić was offered a fight at FFC: Final Fight Championship for the vacated welterweight title that was previously held by Laszlo Senyei. Soldić made his FFC debut in October 2015 at FFC 20 in Zagreb, Croatia, against Saša Drobac, winning via unanimous decision.

Soldić competed for the Final Fight Championship title against Ivica Trušček at FFC 27 – Night of Champions, which took place 17 December 2016 in Zagreb, Croatia. Soldić won by stoppage, and became the FFC welterweight champion.

=== Superior FC ===
Roberto Soldić made his Superior FC debut in a welterweight title bout at Superior FC 16 that took place 11 March 2017 in Darmstadt, Germany, Soldić defeated Poland's Rafael Lewon via TKO in the third round (1:56). It was fourth title Soldić won in less than a year. At Superior FC 18, Soldić defended his title for the first time when he defeated Dez Parker via TKO in the first round (3:29).

=== Cage Warriors ===
On 14 October 2017, Roberto Soldić made his Cage Warriors Fighting Championship debut at CWFC 87 when he fought Lewis Long. Despite his dominant wins and four belts, Soldić was considered an underdog again. However, Soldić defeated his opponent in the first round. Soldić stunned Long with a brutal high kick and then he finished him with ground-and-pound.

=== KSW ===
In December 2017, two months after his win in the match against Lewis Long, Roberto Soldić stepped into the cage for the fifth time in one year in Polish MMA promotion Konfrontacja Sztuk Walki (KSW). By stepping up on ten days’ notice and accepting a welterweight title bout, Soldić decided to take the biggest test in his professional career. His opponent was experienced champion Borys Mankowski. Mankowski's original opponent Dricus du Plessis was forced to withdraw from the match quoting an injury. Soldić defeated Manakowski in the KSW 41 main event. After three rounds, Mankowski and his team decided to give up due to sustained damage. This performance brought Soldić media attention in Poland and across Europe. With this win, Soldić won his fifth belt. Besides his original team in the corner, Sodić was also advised by Hector Lombard. Soldić then called out du Plessis.

Soldić faced Dricus du Plessis in his first defence of the KSW Welterweight Championship at KSW 43: Soldić vs. Du Plessis on 14 April. Du Plessis dethroned Soldic via TKO, after dropping him with a left hook. The two would later rematch at KSW 45: De Fries vs. Bedorf, with Soldić defeating du Plessis via third-round knockout.

Soldić moved up to middleweight to face former KSW Middleweight champ, Michał Materla, on 14 November 2020 at KSW 56: Poland vs. Croatia. Roberto won the fight via first-round TKO.

Soldić defended the KSW Welterweight Championship against challenger Patrik Kincl on 4 September 2021 at KSW 63: Crime of The Century. He won the bout via technical knock out in the third round.

Soldić fought for the KSW Middleweight Championship against champion Mamed Khalidov on 18 December 2021, at KSW 65: Khalidov vs. Soldić. He won the bout and the title via knockout after landing a left hook in the second round.

=== ONE Championship ===
On 1 August 2022, Soldić announced that he signed with ONE Championship.

Soldić made his promotional debut against Murad Ramazanov on 3 December 2022, at ONE on Prime Video 5. During the middle of round one, Ramazanov accidentally connected with a knee to the groin of Soldić, who could not continue. The fight was declared a no contest.

Soldić faced Zebaztian Kadestam on 5 May 2023, at ONE Fight Night 10. Soldić was hit with a counter elbow before losing the fight via TKO in the second round.

Soldić faced Saygid Guseyn Arslanaliev on 20 February 2025, at ONE 171. He won the fight via knockout in round one and this win earned the $50,000 Performance of the Night bonus.

On 7 August 2026, Soldić announced that he was officially a free agent after his contract expired with ONE.

=== Ultimate Fighting Championship ===
On 4 September 2026, it was reported that Soldić signed with the Ultimate Fighting Championship. He faced Khaos Williams on 3 October 2026 at UFC 332. He won the fight by unanimous decision.

Soldić was scheduled to face Daniel Rodriguez on 30 January 2027 at UFC 336. However, for unspecified reasons, the bout was moved to UFC Fight Night 296 which is scheduled to take place on 16 January 2027.

== Boxing career ==
Soldić has pursued a career in professional boxing. He made his professional boxing debut on 2 April 2016 an event in Düsseldorf, Germany, in the light heavyweight division. He defeated Goran Ristić via KO in the first round.

On 17 September 2016, Soldić scored his second boxing win in Göppingen, Germany, where he defeated Milan Rus.

Soldić had his third professional boxing match on 11 February 2017 at an event in Düsseldorf, Germany. He scored a win over Nemanja Kragulja. He scored his fourth win in the boxing ring on 16 November 2017 also in Düsseldorf, Germany, against Slaviša Simeunović via TKO.

== Championships and accomplishments ==
- Konfrontacja Sztuk Walki
  - KSW Welterweight Championship (Two times)
    - Two successful title defenses
  - KSW Middleweight Championship (One time)
  - Fight of the Night (one time) vs. Dricus du Plessis (KSW 45)
  - Knockout of the Night (three times) vs. Vinicius Bohrer (KSW 46), Krystian Kaszubowski (KSW 49), Mamed Khalidov (KSW 65)
- Superior Fighting Championship
  - Superior FC Welterweight Championship (One time)
  - One successful title defense
- Final Fight Championship
  - FFC Welterweight Championship (One time)
- Swiss MMA Championship
  - SMMAC Welterweight Championship (One time)

== Mixed martial arts record ==
Professional record breakdown
27 matches	22 wins	4 losses
By knockout	18	2
By submission	1	0
By decision	3	2
No contests	1	

Res.	Record	Opponent	Method	Event	Date	Round	Time	Location	Notes
Win	22–4 (1)	Khaos Williams	Decision (unanimous)	UFC 332	3 October 2026	3	5:00	Salt Lake City, Utah, United States	Return to Welterweight.
Win	21–4 (1)	Saygid Guseyn Arslanaliev	KO (punch)	ONE 171	20 February 2025	1	1:55	Lusail, Qatar	Performance of the Night.
Loss	20–4 (1)	Zebaztian Kadestam	TKO (punches)	ONE Fight Night 10	5 May 2023	2	0:45	Broomfield, Colorado, United States	
NC	20–3 (1)	Murad Ramazanov	NC (accidental knee to groin)	ONE on Prime Video 5	3 December 2022	1	2:01	Pasay, Philippines	Accidental knee to groin rendered Soldić unable to continue.
Win	20–3	Mamed Khalidov	KO (punch)	KSW 65	18 December 2021	2	3:40	Gliwice, Poland	Won the KSW Middleweight Championship. Knockout of the Night.
Win	19–3	Patrik Kincl	TKO (punches)	KSW 63	4 September 2021	3	2:55	Warsaw, Poland	Defended the KSW Welterweight Championship.
Win	18–3	Michał Materla	TKO (punches)	KSW 56	14 November 2020	1	4:40	Łódź, Poland	Middleweight debut.
Win	17–3	Michał Pietrzak	Decision (unanimous)	KSW 50	14 September 2019	3	5:00	London, England	Catchweight (176 lb) bout.
Win	16–3	Krystian Kaszubowski	KO (punch)	KSW 49	18 May 2019	1	1:25	Gdańsk, Poland	Defended the KSW Welterweight Championship. Knockout of the Night.
Win	15–3	Vinicius Bohrer	KO (punch)	KSW 46	1 December 2018	1	4:34	Gliwice, Poland	Catchweight (176 lb) bout. Knockout of the Night.
Win	14–3	Dricus du Plessis	KO (punches)	KSW 45	6 October 2018	3	2:33	London, England	Won the KSW Welterweight Championship. Fight of the Night.
Loss	13–3	Dricus du Plessis	TKO (punches)	KSW 43	14 April 2018	2	1:38	Wrocław, Poland	Lost the KSW Welterweight Championship.
Win	13–2	Borys Mańkowski	TKO (corner stoppage)	KSW 41	17 December 2017	3	5:00	Katowice, Poland	Won the KSW Welterweight Championship.
Win	12–2	Lewis Long	KO (head kick)	Cage Warriors 87	14 October 2017	1	0:40	Newport, Wales	
Win	11–2	Dez Parker	TKO (punches)	Superior FC 18	16 September 2017	1	3:29	Ludwigshafen, Germany	Defended the Superior FC Welterweight Championship.
Win	10–2	Slobodan Vukić	KO (punch)	Serbian Battle Championship 14	8 July 2017	1	1:04	Bačka Palanka, Serbia	
Win	9–2	Rafal Lewon	TKO (punches)	Superior FC 16	11 March 2017	3	1:56	Darmstadt, Germany	Won the Superior FC Welterweight Championship.
Win	8–2	Ivica Trušček	TKO (punches)	Final Fight Championship 27	17 December 2016	1	1:47	Zagreb, Croatia	Won the vacant FFC Welterweight Championship.
Win	7–2	Pascal Kloser	TKO (punches)	Swiss MMA Championship 4	1 October 2016	1	1:34	Basel, Switzerland	Won the SMMAC Welterweight Championship.
Loss	6–2	Yaroslav Amosov	Decision (split)	Tech-Krep FC: Prime Selection 8	18 June 2016	3	5:00	Krasnodar, Russia	For the vacant Tech-Krep FC Welterweight Championship.
Win	6–1	Vaso Bakočević	TKO (punches)	Serbian Battle Championship 8	5 May 2016	3	1:51	Sombor, Serbia	Catchweight (176 lb) bout.
Win	5–1	Saša Drobac	Decision (unanimous)	Final Fight Championship 20	23 October 2015	3	5:00	Zagreb, Croatia	
Loss	4–1	Marko Radaković	Decision (unanimous)	Montenegro FC 3	27 July 2015	2	5:00	Budva, Montenegro	
Win	4–0	Vladimir Prodanović	TKO (punches)	Serbian Battle Championship 5	9 May 2015	2	1:30	Odžaci, Serbia	
Win	3–0	Savo Lazić	KO (body kick)	Arti FC 4	15 March 2015	1	2:05	Ljubuški, Bosnia and Herzegovina	
Win	2–0	Mladen Ponjević	Submission (guillotine choke)	Thunderman: Fight Night Metkovic 1	21 December 2014	1	0:35	Metković, Croatia	
Win	1–0	Ante Alilović	TKO (punches)	Arti FC 3	19 October 2014	2	2:50	Ljubuški, Bosnia and Herzegovina	Welterweight debut.

== Professional boxing record ==
4 fights	4 wins	0 losses
By knockout	4	0

No.	Result	Record	Opponent	Type	Round, time	Date	Location	Notes
4	Win	4–0	(Bosnia and Herzegovina) Slaviša Simeunović	TKO	2 (6), 0:31	18 Nov 2017	Burg-Waechter Castello, Düsseldorf, North Rhine-Westphalia, Germany	
3	Win	3–0	(Bosnia and Herzegovina) Nemanja Kragulj	KO	1 (4), 1:45	11 Feb 2017	UFD Gym, Düsseldorf, North Rhine-Westphalia, Germany	
2	Win	2–0	(Czech Republic) Milan Ruso	KO	1 (4), 2:58	17 Sep 2016	Göppingen, Baden-Württemberg, Germany	
1	Win	1–0	(Bosnia and Herzegovina) Goran Ristić	KO	1 (4), 1:48	2 Apr 2016	UFD Gym, Düsseldorf, North Rhine-Westphalia, Germany	

== Exhibition boxing record ==
1 fight	1 win	0 losses
By knockout	1	0

No.	Result	Record	Opponent	Type	Round, time	Date	Location	Notes
1	Win	1–0	(Poland) Tomasz Adamek	KO	2 (8), 1:32	6 Sep 2025	Arena Gliwice, Gliwice, Poland	

== See also ==
- List of male mixed martial artists
- Double champions in MMA
