= Michał Andryszak =

Polish mixed martial artist (born 1992)

- Born: Michał Andryszak; April 12, 1992 (age 34); Bydgoszcz, Poland
- Other names: Longer
- Height: 6 ft 5 in (1.96 m)
- Weight: 246 lb (112 kg; 17 st 8 lb)
- Division: Heavyweight (2010–present)
- Reach: 79.5 in (202 cm)
- Fighting out of: Poznań, Poland
- Team: Ankos MMA Poznań
- Years active: 2010–present

Mixed martial arts record
- Total: 44
- Wins: 31
- By knockout: 21
- By submission: 8
- By decision: 1
- By disqualification: 1
- Losses: 12
- By knockout: 7
- By submission: 4
- By decision: 1
- No contests: 1

Other information
- Mixed martial arts record from Sherdog

Michał Andryszak (born April 12, 1992) is a Polish professional mixed martial artist. He currently competes in the Heavyweight division. He is a former FEN and Fight UK Heavyweight Champion. He has previously competed on KSW, ACB, Babilon MMA, Cage Warriors, and Fight Nights Global.

== Professional career ==
=== Early career ===
Andryszak made his professional debut on December 4, 2010, against Bogusław Zawirowski. Andryszak lost the fight via a first-round submission.

=== Fight UK Heavyweight champion ===
After accumulating a career record of 4–1 (1), he faced James Hurrell on November 17, 2012, for the vacant Fight UK Heavyweight Championship. Andryszak won the fight via a first-round submission, winning his first career championship.

=== Fighters Arena ===
Andryszak made his debut under Fighters Arena on November 24, 2012, against Jacek Czajczyński. Andryszak lost the fight via a third-round submission.

After a one-off fight on the regionals, he returned to Fighters Arena on January 26, 2013, against Andrzej Kosecki. Andryszak won the fight via a first-round submission.

His next fight came on March 2, 2013, against Dariusz Zimoląg. Andryszak won the fight via a second-round TKO.

After a loss on the regionals, he returned to Fighters Arena on May 24, 2013, against Michał Pukin. Andryszak won the fight via a first-round TKO.

=== Cage Warriors ===
Andryszak made his debut under Cage Warriors on August 24, 2013, against future Ultimate Fighting Championship (UFC) fighter Ion Cuțelaba. Andryszak won the fight via a first-round disqualification after repeated shots to the back of the head.

=== First Konfrontacja Sztuk Walki Stint ===
Andryszak made his debut under Konfrontacja Sztuk Walki (KSW) on March 22, 2014, against Paweł Słowiński. Andryszak won the fight via a first-round knockout.

After a loss on Fight Nights Global, he returned to KSW on October 4, 2014, against Michał Włodarek. Andryszak lost the fight via TKO nearly half a minute into the fight.

=== Absolute Championship Berkut ===
Andryszak made his debut under Absolute Championship Berkut on February 28, 2015, against Lew Polley in the first round of the ACB Heavyweight Grand Prix 2015. Andryszak won the fight via a first-round TKO.

His next fight came on May 30, 2015, against Zaurbek Bashaev in the semifinals of the tournament. Andryszak won the fight via a first-round TKO.

His next fight came on October 24, 2015, against Salimgerey Rasulov in the final of the tournament. Andryszak lost the fight via a first-round knockout.

Following a one-off win back in Poland, he returned to ACB on February 6, 2016, against Björn Schmiedeberg. Andryszak won the fight via a first-round TKO.

His next fight came on July 15, 2016, against Tim Hague. Andryszak won the fight via a first-round TKO.

His final fight under the federation came on January 21, 2017, against Denis Smoldarev. Andryszak won the fight via a first-round knockout.

=== Second Konfrontacja Sztuk Walki Stint ===
Andryszak returned to Konfrontacja Sztuk Walki (KSW) on May 27, 2017, against Michał Kita, nearly three years since his last fight under the federation. Andryszak won the fight via a first-round submission. This performance earned Andryszak his first Submission of the Night bonus.

His next fight came on December 23, 2017, against Fernando Rodrigues Jr. Andryszak won the fight via a knockout twenty-six seconds into the bout. This performance earned him his first Knockout of the Night bonus.

In his next fight, he faced Phil De Fries on April 14, 2018, for the vacant KSW Heavyweight Championship. Andryszak lost the fight via a first-round TKO.

His next fight came on May 18, 2019, against Luis Henrique. Andryszak lost the fight via a second-round submission.

=== Rocky Warriors Cartel ===
Andryszak made his one and only appearance under Rocky Warriors Cartel on July 31, 2020, against Ion Grigore. Andryszak won the fight via a knockout nine seconds into the fight, being his quickest knockout of his career to date.

=== Third Konfrontacja Sztuk Walki Stint ===
Andryszak made his return to Konfrontacja Sztuk Walki (KSW) on August 29, 2020, in a rematch against Michał Kita. Andryszak lost the fight via a first-round knockout.

His next fight came on January 30, 2021, against Guto Inocente. Andryszak won the fight via a second-round submission.

His final fight under the federation came on September 4, 2021, against Darko Stošić. Andryszak lost the fight via a Split Decision.

=== Fight Exclusive Night ===
Andryszak made his debut under Fight Exclusive Night on January 22, 2022, against Evgeniy Golub. Andryszak won the fight via a first-round TKO.

=== Envio Fight Night ===
Andryszak made his one and only appearance under Envio Fight Night on September 24, 2022, against Jacek Kujtkowski. Andryszak won the fight via a first-round submission.

=== Return to Fight Exclusive Night ===
==== FEN Heavyweight Champion ====
Andryszak returned to Fight Exclusive Night on October 15, 2022, against Eder de Souza for the vacant FEN Heavyweight Championship. Andryszak won the fight via a first-round TKO, winning his second career championship.

=== Failed Professional Fighters League Stint ===
Andryszak was scheduled to make his Professional Fighters League (PFL) debut on April 7, 2023, at PFL 2 (2023) against Denis Goltsov. The fight was later scrapped after Goltsov was rebooked to face Cezar Ferreira at PFL 3 (2023). His new rival was scheduled to be Patrick Brady. Andryszak later withdrew from the fight a day before the event after the Nevada Athletic Commission did not allow him to compete due to failing an eye exam, and was subsequently released from the federation.

=== First Fight Nation Championship Stint ===
Andryszak made his debut under Croatian federation Fight Nation Championship on September 2, 2023, against Ivan Vitasović for his FNC Heavyweight Championship. Andryszak lost the fight via a third-round TKO.

=== Hybrid MMA ===
Andryszak made his debut under Hybrid MMA on April 20, 2024, against Dirlei Broenstrup. Andyrszak won the fight via a second-round TKO.

=== Babilon MMA ===
Andryszak made his debut under Babilon MMA on October 12, 2024, against Marcin Sianos. Andryszak won the fight via a Unanimous Decision.

=== Second Fight Nation Championship Stint ===
Andryszak returned to Fight Nation Championship on February 15, 2025, against Martin Batur. Andryszak won the fight via a first-round TKO after Batur suffered a leg injury.

His next fight came on September 6, 2025, against Said Sowma. Andryszak lost the fight via a third-round TKO.

=== Gala Sportów Walki ===
Andryszak made his debut under Gala Sportów Walki on October 24, 2025, against Wesley Martins. Andryszak won the fight via a first-round TKO.

=== King's Arena ===
Andryszak made his debut under King's Arena on February 7, 2026, against former Ultimate Fighting Championship (UFC) fighter, Ednaldo Oliveira. Andryszak won the fight via a first-round TKO.

=== Third Fight Nation Championship Stint ===
Andryszak returned to Fight Nation Championship on April 11, 2026, against Valdrin Istrefi. Andryszak won the fight via a first-round TKO.

== Championships and accomplishments ==
=== Mixed martial arts ===
- Fight Exclusive Night
  - FEN Heavyweight Champion (One time; former)
- Fight UK
  - Fight UK Heavyweight Champion (One time; former)
- Konfrontacja Sztuk Walki
  - Knockout of the Night (One time)
  - Submission of the Night (One time)

== Mixed martial arts record ==
Professional record breakdown
44 matches	31 wins	12 losses
By knockout	21	7
By submission	8	4
By decision	1	1
By disqualification	1	0
No contests	1	

Res.	Record	Opponent	Method	Event	Date	Round	Time	Location	Notes
Win	31–12 (1)	Valdrin Istrefi	TKO (punches)	Fight Nation Championship 29	April 11, 2026	1	2:35	Ljubljana, Slovenia	
Win	30–12 (1)	Ednaldo Oliveira	TKO (elbows)	King's Arena 2	February 7, 2026	1	3:46	Olsztyn, Poland	
Win	29–12 (1)	Wesley Martins	TKO (elbows and punches)	Gala Sportów Walki 15	October 24, 2025	1	1:27	Międzychód, Poland	
Loss	28–12 (1)	Said Sowma	TKO (punches)	Fight Nation Championship 24	September 6, 2025	3	1:41	Zagreb, Croatia	
Win	28–11 (1)	Martin Batur	TKO (leg injury)	Fight Nation Championship 21	February 15, 2025	1	0:37	Zadar, Croatia	
Win	27–11 (1)	Marcin Sianos	Decision (unanimous)	Babilon MMA 48	October 12, 2024	3	5:00	Sosnowiec, Poland	
Win	26–11 (1)	Dirlei Broenstrup	TKO (body kick and punches)	Hybrid MMA 4	April 20, 2024	2	1:04	Zielona Góra, Poland	
Loss	25–11 (1)	Ivan Vitasović	TKO (punches)	Fight Nation Championship 12	September 2, 2023	3	3:36	Pula, Croatia	For the FNC Heavyweight Championship.
Win	25–10 (1)	Eder de Souza	TKO (punches)	Fight Exclusive Night 42	October 15, 2022	1	0:35	Wrocław, Poland	Won the vacant FEN Heavyweight Championship
Win	24–10 (1)	Jacek Kujtkowski	Submission (forearm choke)	Envio Fight Night '22	September 24, 2022	1	1:19	Bydgoszcz, Poland	
Win	23–10 (1)	Evgeniy Golub	TKO (head kick and elbows)	Fight Exclusive Night 38	January 22, 2022	1	0:54	Ostrów Wielkopolski, Poland	
Loss	22–10 (1)	Darko Stošić	Decision (split)	KSW 63	September 4, 2021	3	5:00	Warsaw, Poland	
Win	22–9 (1)	Guto Inocente	Submission (arm triangle choke)	KSW 58	January 30, 2021	2	4:07	Łódź, Poland	
Loss	21–9 (1)	Michał Kita	KO (punch)	KSW 54	August 29, 2020	1	2:59	Warsaw, Poland	
Win	21–8 (1)	Ion Grigore	KO (head kick)	Rocky Warriors Cartel 5	July 31, 2020	1	0:09	Mrągowo, Poland	
Loss	20–8 (1)	Luis Henrique	Technical Submission (guillotine choke)	KSW 49	May 18, 2019	2	4:52	Gdańsk, Poland	
Loss	20–7 (1)	Phil De Fries	TKO (punches)	KSW 43	April 14, 2018	1	3:32	Wrocław, Poland	For the vacant KSW Heavyweight Championship.
Win	20–6 (1)	Fernando Rodrigues Jr	KO (punches)	KSW 41	December 23, 2017	1	0:26	Katowice, Poland	Knockout of the Night.
Win	19–6 (1)	Michał Kita	Submission (anaconda choke)	KSW 39	May 27, 2017	1	1:14	Warsaw, Poland	Submission of the Night.
Win	18–6 (1)	Denis Smoldarev	KO (knee)	ACB 52	January 21, 2017	1	3:18	Vienna, Austria	
Win	17–6 (1)	Tim Hague	TKO (head kick and punches)	ACB 41	July 15, 2016	1	0:33	Sochi, Russia	
Win	16–6 (1)	Björn Schmiedeberg	TKO (punches)	ACB 29	February 6, 2016	1	1:38	Warsaw, Poland	
Win	15–6 (1)	Andrzej Kulik	TKO (head kick and punches)	Swarzędz Heavyweight Fight Night	November 14, 2015	1	0:17	Swarzędz, Poland	
Loss	14–6 (1)	Salimgerey Rasulov	TKO (punches)	ACB 24	October 24, 2015	1	0:25	Moscow, Russia	ACB Heavyweight Grand Prix 2015 Final.
Win	14–5 (1)	Zaurbek Bashaev	TKO (head kick and punches)	ACB 19	May 30, 2015	1	0:26	Kaliningrad, Russia	ACB Heavyweight Grand Prix 2015 Semifinal.
Win	13–5 (1)	Lew Polley	TKO (punches)	ACB 14	February 28, 2015	1	3:15	Grozny, Russia	ACB Heavyweight Grand Prix 2015 Quarterfinal.
Loss	12–5 (1)	Michal Włodarek	TKO (punches)	KSW 28	October 4, 2014	1	0:27	Szczecin, Poland	
Loss	12–4 (1)	Konstantin Erokhin	TKO (punches)	Fight Nights Global 26	July 11, 2014	1	0:32	Moscow, Russia	
Win	12–3 (1)	Paweł Słowiński	KO (punch)	KSW 26	March 22, 2014	1	1:06	Warsaw, Poland	
Win	11–3 (1)	Baga Agaev	TKO (punches)	MMA Fighters Club	November 9, 2013	1	1:02	Inowrocław, Poland	
Win	10–3 (1)	Ion Cuțelaba	DQ (punches to back of head)	Cage Warriors 58	August 24, 2013	1	4:07	Grozny, Russia	
Win	9–3 (1)	Michał Pukin	TKO (punches)	Fighters Arena 8	May 24, 2013	1	1:23	Bełchatów, Poland	
Loss	8–3 (1)	Ņikita Petrovs	Submission (triangle choke)	Wenglorz Fight Cup 4	March 23, 2013	1	N/A	Olsztyn, Poland	
Win	8–2 (1)	Dariusz Zimoląg	TKO (punches)	Fighters Arena 6	March 2, 2013	2	2:27	Częstochowa, Poland	
Win	7–2 (1)	Andrzej Kosecki	Submission (anaconda choke)	Fighters Arena 5	January 26, 2013	1	0:57	Kraśnik, Poland	
Win	6–2 (1)	Radosław Kostrubiec	TKO (punches)	PLMMA 11	January 13, 2013	1	2:18	Zamość, Poland	
Loss	5–2 (1)	Jacek Czajczyński	Submission (guillotine choke)	Fighters Arena 4	November 24, 2012	3	3:20	Włocławek, Poland	
Win	5–1 (1)	James Hurrell	Submission (rear-naked choke)	Fight UK 8	November 17, 2012	1	2:16	Leicester, England	Won the vacant Fight UK Heavyweight Championship.
Win	4–1 (1)	Robert Maruszak	KO (head kick)	PLMMA 6	October 7, 2012	1	2:34	Brodnica, Poland	
Win	3–1 (1)	Bartosz Rozycki	Submission (arm triangle choke)	Xcage 4	May 19, 2012	1	4:01	Toruń, Poland	
NC	2–1 (1)	Marcin Zontek	NC (result overturned by federation)	Olimp Extreme Fight: Polska vs Węgry	February 24, 2012	1	0:39	Rzeszów, Poland	Carpathian Primus Belt Heavyweight Tournament quarterfinal.
Win	2–1	Marcin Zontek	Submission (anaconda choke)	Xcage 3	December 3, 2011	1	1:00	Toruń, Poland	
Win	1–1	Sandino Walczyk	TKO (punches)	STC: Bydgoszcz vs Toruń	October 1, 2011	1	1:09	Toruń, Poland	
Loss	0–1	Bogusław Zawirowski	Submission (guillotine choke)	PAMMA: Northern Poland Championships	December 4, 2010	1	4:58	Olsztyn, Poland	Heavyweight debut.

== See also ==
- List of male mixed martial artists
