= Darko Stošić =

Serbian Mixed Martial Artist

- Born: February 9, 1992 (age 34); Laćarak, Serbia, Yugoslavia
- Other names: "The Hammer"
- Nationality: Serbian
- Height: 6 ft 0 in (1.83 m)
- Weight: 243 lb (110 kg; 17.4 st)
- Division: Heavyweight (currently); Light Heavyweight (formerly)
- Reach: 76 in (193 cm)
- Style: Judo
- Fighting out of: Belgrade, Serbia
- Team: MMA Red Star
- Years active: 2012–present

Mixed martial arts record
- Total: 32
- Wins: 24
- By knockout: 17
- By submission: 1
- By decision: 6
- Losses: 8
- By knockout: 4
- By decision: 4

Other information
- Mixed martial arts record from Sherdog

Darko Stošić (Serbian: Дарко Стошић; born February 9, 1992) is a Serbian mixed martial artist currently fighting for Konfrontacja Sztuk Walki (KSW) in the heavyweight division. He is the former Final Fight Championship (FFC) heavyweight champion and he also competed in the Ultimate Fighting Championship (UFC). He is currently ranked #5 in the KSW heavyweight rankings.

Stosic is the reigning FNC Heavyweight Champion. He won the title in September 2026 and is currently ranked 37th in the FightMatrix heavyweight rankings.

== Background ==
Stošić was born in Laćarak, Serbia in 1992. He attended Triva Vitasović Lebarnik Primary School where he started his judo lessons in LSK Judo Club in Laćarak. He won many judo championships in Serbia and the Balkan region before he went to compete in kickboxing. He transitioned to MMA at the age of 18, training at the Car Dušan Silni gym along with Gagi Tešanović and Rođa Radosavljević, after Tesla Fighting Championship was formed, in hope to fight under the promotion.

== Judo career ==
Stošić started training in judo at the age of seven until 2012 under Miša Jovetić. He was the judo national champion 10 times and twice Balkan champion which he was awarded the best athlete in MMA Red Star.

== Mixed martial arts career ==
=== Early career ===
Stošić started his professional MMA career in 2012 and fought under various promotions namely Tesla Fighting Championship, Adrenalin Freefight Challenge and Final Fight Championship where he was the heavyweight champion. He amassed the record of 12–1 prior to being signed by UFC in December 2017.

=== Ultimate Fighting Championship ===
Stošić made his UFC promotion debut on July 22, 2018, at UFC Fight Night: Shogun vs. Smith against Jeremy Kimball. He won the fight via technical knockout.

Stošić was scheduled to face Magomed Ankalaev on February 23, 2019, at UFC on ESPN+ 3. However, Stošić pulled out of the fight on January 23, 2019, citing injury. Ankalaev instead faced promotional newcomer Klidson Abreu.

His second UFC fight came on June 1, 2019, against Devin Clark at UFC Fight Night: Gustafsson vs. Smith. He lost the fight via unanimous decision.

Stošić faced Kennedy Nzechukwu on August 3, 2019, at UFC on ESPN: Covington vs. Lawler. He lost the fight via unanimous decision.

Stošić faced Jamahal Hill on January 25, 2020, at UFC Fight Night 166. He lost the fight via unanimous decision.

Stošić was released by the UFC on February 11, 2020.

=== KSW ===
It was announced in April 2020, that Darko was signing a 4-fight deal with KSW. For his organizational debut, Stošić is scheduled to fight the five-fight KSW veteran Michał Włodarek at KSW 58. The fight was later postponed for KSW 59: Fight Code. He won the bout via KO in the second round.

Stošić, as a replacement for Jay Silva, faced Michał Kita on June 5, 2021, at KSW 61. He controlled most of the bout and finished Kita in the first round via ground and pound.

Stošić faced Michał Andryszak on September 4, 2021, at KSW 63: Crime of The Century. He won the bout via split decision.

Stošić fought for the KSW Heavyweight Championship against reigning champion Phil De Fries at KSW 67 on February 26, 2022. He lost the bout via TKO after tapping due to combination of exhaustion and damage in the fifth round.

Stošić faced Michał Kita in a rematch at KSW 74: De Fries vs. Prasel on September 10, 2022. He won the bout in the second round, knocking Kita out.

Stošić faced Shamil Gaziev on February 18, 2023, at BRAVE CF 69, losing the bout via TKO stoppage in the first round.

Stošić faced Štefan Vojčák on July 15, 2023, at KSW 84: De Fries vs. Bajor, winning the bout after knocking Vojcak out in the third round.

Stošić headlined KSW 87 against Michal Martínek on October 15, 2023, winning the bout after knocking out Martínek in the first round.

Stošić faced Matheus Scheffel at XTB KSW Epic: Chalidow vs Adamek on February 24, 2024, winning the bout via ground and pound TKO in the first round.

On June 1, 2024, Stošić faced Miran Fabjan in the main event of FNC 17, defeating him via TKO stoppage despite being hurt earlier in the round.

==== Other promotions ====
Stošić faced former NFL player and fellow UFC alum Greg Hardy at FNC 31 on May 30, 2026 in a catchweight bout after Hardy missed weight by 25 pounds. He won the fight by knockout in the third round.

== Championships and accomplishments ==
=== Judo ===
- 2008 Serbian U17 under 90 kg Champion
- 2008 Balkan U17 under 90 kg Champion
- 2010 Serbian U20 under 100 kg Champion
- 2010 Serbian U23 under 100 kg Champion
- 2011 Serbian U20 under 100 kg Champion
- 2011 Balkan U20 under 100 kg Champion

=== Mixed martial arts ===
- Final Fight Championship
  - FFC Heavyweight Championship (One time)
    - Two successful title defenses
    - Fight Nation Championship

== Mixed martial arts record ==
Professional record breakdown
32 matches	24 wins	8 losses
By knockout	17	4
By submission	1	0
By decision	6	4

Res.	Record	Opponent	Method	Event	Date	Round	Time	Location	Notes
Win	24–8	Hatef Moeil	Decision (unanimous)	FNC 33	September 12, 2026	5	5:00	Zagreb, Croatia	Won the FNC Heavyweight Championship.
Win	23–8	Greg Hardy	KO (punches)	FNC 31	May 30, 2026	3	2:42	Belgrade, Serbia	Catchweight (292.3 lb) bout; Hardy missed weight.
Win	22–8	Oli Thompson	TKO (knee and punches)	FNC 27	February 7, 2026	2	1:48	Munich, Germany	
Loss	21–8	Ivan Vitasović	Decision (unanimous)	FNC 24	September 6, 2025	5	5:00	Zagreb, Croatia	For the FNC Heavyweight Championship.
Loss	21–7	Phil De Fries	TKO (punches)	KSW 100	November 16, 2024	1	4:11	Gliwice, Poland	For the KSW Heavyweight Championship.
Win	21–6	Miran Fabjan	TKO (punches)	FNC 17	June 1, 2024	1	0:45	Belgrade, Serbia	
Win	20–6	Matheus Scheffel	TKO (punches)	KSW Epic: Khalidov vs. Adamek	February 24, 2024	1	1:14	Gliwice, Poland	Pride Rules.
Win	19–6	Michal Martínek	KO (punches)	KSW 87	October 15, 2023	1	2:04	Třinec, Czech Republic	Knockout of the Night.
Win	18–6	Štefan Vojčák	KO (punches)	KSW 84	July 15, 2023	3	2:34	Gdynia, Poland	Knockout of the Night.
Loss	17–6	Shamil Gaziev	TKO (punches)	Brave CF 69	February 18, 2023	1	2:54	Belgrade, Serbia	
Win	17–5	Michał Kita	KO (punches)	KSW 74	September 10, 2022	2	2:54	Ostrów Wielkopolski, Poland	Knockout of the Night.
Loss	16–5	Phil De Fries	TKO (submission to punches)	KSW 67	February 26, 2022	5	3:44	Warsaw, Poland	For the KSW Heavyweight Championship.
Win	16–4	Michał Andryszak	Decision (split)	KSW 63	September 4, 2021	3	5:00	Warsaw, Poland	
Win	15–4	Michał Kita	TKO (punches)	KSW 61	June 5, 2021	1	4:05	Gdańsk, Poland	Knockout of the Night.
Win	14–4	Michał Włodarek	KO (punches)	KSW 59	March 20, 2021	2	4:39	Łódź, Poland	Return to Heavyweight. Knockout of the Night
Loss	13–4	Jamahal Hill	Decision (unanimous)	UFC Fight Night: Blaydes vs. dos Santos	January 25, 2020	3	5:00	Raleigh, North Carolina, United States	
Loss	13–3	Kennedy Nzechukwu	Decision (unanimous)	UFC on ESPN: Covington vs. Lawler	August 3, 2019	3	5:00	Newark, New Jersey, United States	Stošić was deducted two points, one in round two and one in round three, both due to repeated groin strikes.
Loss	13–2	Devin Clark	Decision (unanimous)	UFC Fight Night: Gustafsson vs. Smith	June 1, 2019	3	5:00	Stockholm, Sweden	
Win	13–1	Jeremy Kimball	TKO (elbows and punches)	UFC Fight Night: Shogun vs. Smith	July 22, 2018	1	3:13	Hamburg, Germany	Return to light heavyweight.
Win	12–1	Tomasz Czerwiński	TKO (punches)	Collision Fighting League 1	September 30, 2017	1	N/A	Belgrade, Serbia	
Win	11–1	Emil Zahariev	TKO (leg kicks)	Final Fight Championship 28	March 11, 2017	1	2:07	Athens, Greece	Defended the FFC Heavyweight Championship.
Win	10–1	Dion Staring	Decision (unanimous)	Final Fight Championship 27	December 17, 2016	3	5:00	Zagreb, Croatia	Defended the FFC Heavyweight Championship.
Win	9–1	Dion Staring	Decision (majority)	Final Fight Championship 26	August 4, 2016	3	5:00	Linz, Austria	Won the FFC Heavyweight Championship.
Win	8–1	Manny Murillo	TKO (punches)	Final Fight Championship 25	June 11, 2016	1	0:56	Springfield, Massachusetts, United States	
Win	7–1	Ivan Vitasović	Submission (americana)	Final Fight Championship 21	June 11, 2016	1	2:59	Rijeka, Croatia	
Win	6–1	Hatef Moeil	TKO (punches)	Final Fight Championship 19	September 18, 2015	2	1:17	Linz, Austria	
Win	5–1	Dionysis Papadopoulos	TKO (punches)	Final Fight Championship 7	March 13, 2015	1	0:59	Sarajevo, Bosnia and Herzegovina	Return to heavyweight.
Loss	4–1	Jiří Procházka	TKO (punches)	GCF Challenge: Cage Fight 5	August 4, 2014	1	1:09	Brno, Czech Republic	Light heavyweight debut.
Win	4–0	Rizvan Kuniev	Decision (unanimous)	Tesla FC 4	June 14, 2014	3	5:00	Pomoravlje, Serbia	
Win	3–0	Saša Lazić	TKO (punches)	Master Challenge 2	January 12, 2014	1	2:19	Pomoravlje, Serbia	
Win	2–0	Rok Kokotec	TKO (punches)	Adrenalin Freefight Challenge 6	May 18, 2013	1	0:30	Trbovlje, Slovenia	
Win	1–0	Željko Sarić	Decision (unanimous)	Tesla Fighting Championship 3	June 23, 2012	3	5:00	Belgrade, Serbia	Heavyweight debut.

== See also ==
- List of current KSW fighters
- List of male mixed martial artists
