= 2020 in Konfrontacja Sztuk Walki =

Mixed martial arts events

Information
- First date: July 11, 2020
- Last date: December 19, 2020

Events
- Total events: 6

Fights
- Total fights: 47
- Title fights: 6

Chronology
2019 in KSW	2020 in Konfrontacja Sztuk Walki	2021 in KSW

The year 2020 was the 17th year in the history of the Konfrontacja Sztuk Walki, a mixed martial arts promotion based in Poland. 2020 will begin with KSW 53.

== Background ==
Martin Lewandowski announced that KSW has plans for European expansion and will intend to do a new series of smaller events in 2020. KSW has plans for a reality TV show.

== List of events ==
#	Event title	Date	Arena	Location
1	KSW 53: Reborn	July 11, 2020	Undisclosed Studio	Warsaw, Poland
2	KSW 54: Gamrot vs. Ziółkowski	August 29, 2020	Global EXPO	Warsaw, Poland
3	KSW 55: Askham vs. Khalidov 2	October 10, 2020	Wytwórnia Club	Łódź, Poland
4	Genesis: Różalski vs. Barnett	October 23, 2020	Wytwórnia Club	Łódź, Poland
5	KSW 56: Materla vs. Soldić	November 14, 2020	Wytwórnia Club	Łódź, Poland
6	KSW 57: De Fries vs. Kita	December 19, 2020	Wytwórnia Club	Łódź, Poland

== Only One ==
The series was officially announced by KSW and POLSAT TV at a press conference on December 7, 2019. The trainers for the series, which will feature 10 welterweight fighters, will be Marcin Wrzosek and Łukasz Zaborowski. The 10 fighters will be competing for a contract with KSW. The weekly series will culminate in a live finale on POLSAT TV. It debuted on POLSAT TV on March 6, 2020.

=== Participants ===
- (Poland) Paweł Kiełek
- (Poland) Piotr Walawski
- (Poland) Mariusz Radziszewski
- (Poland) Marcin Krakowiak
- (Poland) Bartłomiej Gładkowicz
- (Poland) Kamil Dołgowski
- (Poland) Adrian Bartosiński
- (Poland) Tomasz Romanowski
- (Poland) Michał Sobiech
- (Poland) Karol Wesling

==== KSW Tylko Jeden Tournament bracket ====
Quarterfinals
(Poland) Paweł Kiełek	1r.
(Poland) Marcin Krakowiak	SUB
(Poland) Mariusz Radziszewski	2r.
(Poland) Tomasz Romanowski	UD
(Poland) Kamil Dołgowski	1r.
(Poland) Adrian Bartosiński	TKO
(Poland) Piotr Walawski	UD
(Poland) Paweł Kiełek^{1}	2r.

Semifinals
(Poland) Marcin Krakowiak	3r.
(Poland) Tomasz Romanowski	UD
(Poland) Adrian Bartosiński	TKO
(Poland) Piotr Walawski	3r.

Final
(Poland) Tomasz Romanowski	UD
(Poland) Marcin Krakowiak^{1}	3r.

^{1}Bartłomiej Gładkowicz missed weight and was expelled from the show, he was subsequently replaced by Paweł Kiełek who get a second chance in the show.

^{2}Adrian Bartosiński was injured and couldn't participate in the final, and was subsequently replaced by Marcin Krakowiak.

== KSW 53: Reborn ==
KSW 53: Reborn
- Promotion: Konfrontacja Sztuk Walki
- Date: July 11, 2020
- Venue: Undisclosed Studio
- City: Warsaw, Poland

'KSW 53: Reborn' was a mixed martial arts event held by Konfrontacja Sztuk Walki on July 11, 2020 in Warsaw, Poland.

The event was initially planned to be held on March 21, 2020 at the Atlas Arena in Łódź, Poland. However, the event was cancelled on March 11, 2020, due to the COVID-19 pandemic.

=== Background ===
Norman Parke missed weight ahead of his trilogy bout with Mateusz Gamrot for the undisputed KSW Lightweight Title. Both parties have agreed to complete their trilogy, however, the bout was a five-round catchweight non-title bout.

Roman Szymański was scheduled to face Mateusz Legierski, but Legierski was forced off the card on June 25 with an injury. Filip Pejić served as Legierski's replacement, taking the short notice fight against Szymański.

Bonus awards

The following fighters were awarded bonuses:

- Fight of the Night: Roman Szymański vs. Filip Pejić
- Knockout of the Night: Michał Pietrzak
- Knockout of the Night: Sebastian Przybysz

=== Results ===
KSW 53
Weight Class				Method	Round	Time	Notes
Catchweight 71.8 kg	(Poland) Mateusz Gamrot	def.	(Northern Ireland) Norman Parke	TKO (Doctor Stoppage)	3	3:02	
Lightweight 70 kg	(Poland) Borys Mańkowski	def.	(Poland) Marcin Wrzosek	Decision (Unanimous)	3	5:00	
Middleweight 84 kg	(Poland) Tomasz Drwal	def.	(Poland) Łukasz Bieńkowski	TKO (Punches)	2	2:34	
Welterweight 77 kg	(Poland) Andrzej Grzebyk	def.	(Poland) Tomasz Jakubiec	TKO (Punches)	2	0:15	
Lightweight 70 kg	(Poland) Roman Szymański	def.	(Croatia) Filip Pejić	TKO (Punches)	3	4:37	
Lightweight 70 kg	(Poland) Artur Sowiński	def.	(Poland) Gracjan Szadziński	TKO (Punches)	1	2:04	
Catchweight 80 kg	(Poland) Michał Pietrzak	def.	(Poland) Kamil Szymuszowski	KO (Punches)	1	0:56	
Bantamweight 61 kg	(Poland) Sebastian Przybysz	def.	(Poland) Jakub Wikłacz	TKO (Punches to the Body)	3	1:18	

== KSW 54: Gamrot vs. Ziółkowski ==
KSW 54: Gamrot vs. Ziółkowski
- Promotion: Konfrontacja Sztuk Walki
- Date: August 29, 2020
- Venue: Global EXPO
- City: Warsaw, Poland

'KSW 54: Gamrot vs. Ziółkowski' was a mixed martial arts event held by Konfrontacja Sztuk Walki on August 29, 2020 in Warsaw, Poland.

=== Background ===
Shamil Musaev was scheduled to challenge Mateusz Gamrot in the KSW 54 main event, but Musaev has to withdraw from the bout due to a knee injury sustained in training. Marian Ziółkowski was pulled from a planned bout with Maciej Kazieczko and faced Gamrot for the KSW Lightweight Championship in the KSW 54 main event. Kazieczko instead faced Karlo Caput who stepped in on short notice for this encounter.

Łukasz Rajewski missed weight by two pounds ahead of his scheduled lightweight bout with Bartłomiej Kopera. Both parties have agreed to compete a catchweight bout, Rajewski has been fined 30 percent of his purse.

Bonus awards

The following fighters were awarded bonuses:

- Fight of the Night: Łukasz Rajewski vs. Bartłomiej Kopera
- Knockout of the Night: Michał Kita
- Performance of the Night: Sebastian Rajewski

=== Results ===
KSW 54
Weight Class				Method	Round	Time	Notes
Lightweight 70 kg	(Poland) Mateusz Gamrot (c)	def.	(Poland) Marian Ziółkowski	Decision (Unanimous)	5	5:00	For the KSW Lightweight Championship
Heavyweight 120 kg	(Poland) Izu Ugonoh	def.	(Portugal) Quentin Domingos	TKO (Leg Injury)	1	2:22	
Heavyweight 120 kg	(Poland) Michał Kita	def.	(Poland) Michał Andryszak	KO (Punch)	1	2:59	
Lightweight 70 kg	(Poland) Maciej Kazieczko	def.	(Croatia) Karlo Caput	TKO (Punches)	3	4:29	
Bantamweight 61 kg	(Poland) Paweł Polityło	def.	(Romania) Bogdan Barbu	Decision (Unanimous)	3	5:00	
Lightweight 70 kg	(Poland) Łukasz Rajewski	def.	(Poland) Bartłomiej Kopera	Decision (Split)	3	5:00	
Welterweight 77 kg	(Poland) Kacper Koziorzębski	def.	(Poland) Adam Niedźwiedź	TKO (Leg Injury)	2	2:27	
Lightweight 70 kg	(Poland) Sebastian Rajewski	def.	(Armenia) Armen Stepanyan	Decision (Unanimous)	3	5:00	

== KSW 55: Askham vs. Khalidov 2 ==
KSW 55: Askham vs. Khalidov 2
- Promotion: Konfrontacja Sztuk Walki
- Date: October 10, 2020
- Venue: Wytwórnia Club
- City: Łódź, Poland

'KSW 55: Askham vs. Khalidov 2' was a mixed martial arts event held by Konfrontacja Sztuk Walki on October 10, 2020 at the Wytwórnia Club in Łódź, Poland.

=== Background ===
A KSW Middleweight Championship rematch between current champion Scott Askham and former champion Mamed Khalidov served as the event's headliner. The pairing met previously at KSW 52: Race on December 7, 2019 in a catchweight non-title bout, Askham had dominated Khalidov during three round to capture the unanimous decision win.

Bonus awards

The following fighters were awarded bonuses:

- Fight of the Night: Michał Materla vs. Aleksandar Ilić
- Knockout of the Night: Mamed Khalidov
- Submission of the Night: Damian Stasiak

=== Results ===
KSW 55
Weight Class				Method	Round	Time	Notes
Middleweight 84 kg	(Poland) Mamed Khalidov	def.	(England) Scott Askham (c)	KO (Head Kick)	1	0:32	For the KSW Middleweight Championship
Middleweight 84 kg	(Poland) Michał Materla	def.	(Serbia) Aleksandar Ilić	TKO (Elbows)	2	1:32	
Light Heavyweight 93 kg	(Poland) Damian Janikowski	def.	(Sweden) Andreas Gustafsson	Decision (Split)	3	5:00	
Welterweight 77 kg	(Poland) Tomasz Romanowski	def.	(Moldova) Ion Surdu	Decision (Unanimous)	3	5:00	
Bantamweight 61 kg	(Poland) Damian Stasiak	def.	(Poland) Patryk Surdyn	Submission (Arm-Triangle Choke)	2	4:17	
Catchweight 95 kg	(Poland) Przemysław Mysiala	def.	(Croatia) Stipe Bekavac	TKO (Punches)	2	4:06	
Welterweight 77 kg	(Poland) Krystian Kaszubowski	def.	(Poland) Jakub Kamieniarz	Decision (Unanimous)	3	5:00	
W.Strawweight 52 kg	(Poland) Karolina Wójcik	def.	(Poland) Sylwia Juśkiewicz	Decision (Unanimous)	3	5:00	

== Genesis: Różalski vs. Barnett ==
Genesis: Różalski vs. Barnett
- Promotion: Konfrontacja Sztuk Walki
- Date: October 23, 2020
- City: Poland

'Genesis: Różalski vs. Barnett' was a bare-knuckle fighting event held by Konfrontacja Sztuk Walki on October 23, 2020.

=== Background ===
KSW has launched a new bare knuckle fighting event serie called Genesis.

Former UFC heavyweight Josh Barnett returned to the ring when he took on the former KSW heavyweight champion Marcin Rozalski in a bare-knuckle boxing match in the first main event under the Genesis banner.

=== Results ===
Genesis
Weight Class				Method	Round	Time	Notes
Heavyweight 120 kg	(United States) Josh Barnett	def.	(Poland) Marcin Różalski	TKO (Doctor Stoppage)	2	3:00	
Catchweight 65 kg	(Poland) Michał Królik	def.	(Poland) Bartosz Batra	Decision (Unanimous)	3	3:00	
Catchweight 80 kg	(Montenegro) Vaso Bakocević	def.	(Poland) Dariusz Rutkiewicz	TKO (Punches)	2	0:57	
Catchweight 73 kg	(Poland) Gracjan Szadziński	def.	(Czech Republic) Jan Siroky	KO (Punch to the body)	2	1:52	
W.Featherweight 57 kg	(Poland) Aleksandra Rola	def.	(Poland) Monika Porażyńska	Decision (Unanimous)	3	3:00	
Heavyweight 120 kg	(Poland) Rafał Kijańczuk	def.	(Poland) Marcin Wasilewski	Decision (Split)	3	3:00	
Catchweight 72 kg	(Poland) Damian Szmigielski	def.	(Belarus) Denis Makowski	Decision (Split)	3	3:00	

== KSW 56: Materla vs. Soldić ==
KSW 56: Materla vs. Soldić
- Promotion: Konfrontacja Sztuk Walki
- Date: November 14, 2020
- Venue: Wytwórnia Club
- City: Łódź, Poland

KSW 56: Materla vs. Soldić was a mixed martial arts event held by Konfrontacja Sztuk Walki on November 14, 2020 at the Wytwórnia Club in Łódź, Poland.

=== Background ===
In the event headliner, the reigning KSW welterweight champion Roberto Soldić moved up to 185 pounds to challenge the former KSW middleweight champion Michał Materla.

The co-main event of the evening featured a title bout between the reigning KSW light heavyweight champion Tomasz Narkun and the undefeated Croatian Ivan Erslan.

Sebastian Rajewski was scheduled to face Michał Sobiech, but Sobiech was forced off the card on November 4 due to a hand injury. Filip Pejić served as Sobiech replacement, takes short notice fight against Rajewski.

Bonus awards

The following fighters were awarded bonuses:

- Fight of the Night: Daniel Torres vs. Max Coga
- Knockout of the Night: Filip Pejić
- Submission of the Night: Robert Ruchała

=== Results ===
KSW 56
Weight Class				Method	Round	Time	Notes
Middleweight 84 kg	(Croatia) Roberto Soldić	def.	(Poland) Michał Materla	TKO (Punches)	1	4:40	
Light Heavyweight 93 kg	(Poland) Tomasz Narkun (c)	def.	(Croatia) Ivan Erslan	Submission (Rear-Naked Choke)	2	0:51	For the KSW Light Heavyweight Championship
W.Flyweight 57 kg	(Poland) Justyna Haba	def.	(Poland) Karolina Owczarz	Decision (Unanimous)	3	5:00	
Welterweight 77 kg	(Lithuania) Marius Zaromskis	def.	(Poland) Andrzej Grzebyk	TKO (Leg Injury)	1	4:58	
Catchweight 73 kg	(Poland) Mateusz Legierski	def.	(Argentina) Francisco Barrio	Decision (Majority)	3	5:00	
Catchweight 68 kg	(Croatia) Filip Pejić	def.	(Poland) Sebastian Rajewski	KO (Punches)	1	0:09	
Featherweight 66 kg	(Brazil) Daniel Torres	def.	(Germany) Max Coga	Decision (Split)	3	5:00	
Featherweight 66 kg	(Poland) Robert Ruchała	def.	(Poland) Michał Domin	Submission (Armbar)	1	4:59	

== KSW 57: De Fries vs. Kita ==
KSW 57: De Fries vs. Kita
- Promotion: Konfrontacja Sztuk Walki
- Date: December 19, 2020
- Venue: Wytwórnia Club
- City: Łódź, Poland

'KSW 57: De Fries vs. Kita' was a mixed martial arts event held by Konfrontacja Sztuk Walki on December 19, 2020 at the Wytwórnia Club in Łódź, Poland.

=== Background ===
The event featured three title fights. In the headliner, Phil De Fries has put his KSW heavyweight crown on the line against Michał Kita. Marian Ziółkowski and Roman Szymański has battled for the vacant KSW lightweight belt and KSW bantamweight champion, Antun Račić, has met Bruno dos Santos in the first defense of his KSW bantamweight title.

Bonus awards

The following fighters were awarded bonuses:

- Fight of the Night: Marcin Krakowiak vs. Kacper Koziorzębski
- Knockout of the Night: Marian Ziółkowski
- Submission of the Night: Abusupiyan Magomedov

=== Results ===
KSW 57
Weight Class				Method	Round	Time	Notes
Heavyweight 120 kg	(England) Phil De Fries (c)	def.	(Poland) Michał Kita	TKO (Punches)	2	0:59	For the KSW Heavyweight Championship
Lightweight 70 kg	(Poland) Marian Ziółkowski	def.	(Poland) Roman Szymański	KO (Kick to the Body)	4	4:00	For the Vacant KSW Lightweight Championship
Lightweight 70 kg	(Poland) Borys Mańkowski	def.	(Poland) Artur Sowiński	Decision (Unanimous)	3	5:00	
Bantamweight 61 kg	(Croatia) Antun Račić (c)	def.	(Brazil) Bruno dos Santos	Decision (Unanimous)	5	5:00	For the KSW Bantamweight Championship
Middleweight 84 kg	(Germany) Abusupiyan Magomedov	def.	(Poland) Cezary Kęsik	Submission (Guillotine Choke)	2	1:52	
Middleweight 84 kg	(Czech Republic) Patrik Kincl	def.	(Poland) Tomasz Drwal	KO (Punch)	1	4:22	
Catchweight 80 kg	(Poland) Marcin Krakowiak	def.	(Poland) Kacper Koziorzębski	Submission (Guillotine Choke)	3	4:06	
Welterweight 77 kg	(Germany) Christian Eckerlin	def.	(Poland) Albert Odzimkowski	Decision (Split)	3	5:00	

== See also ==
- 2020 in UFC
- 2020 in Bellator MMA
- 2020 in ONE Championship
- 2020 in Absolute Championship Akhmat
- 2020 in Rizin Fighting Federation
- 2020 in Legacy Fighting Alliance
- 2020 in RXF
