= Jakub Wikłacz =

Polish mixed martial artist (born 1996)

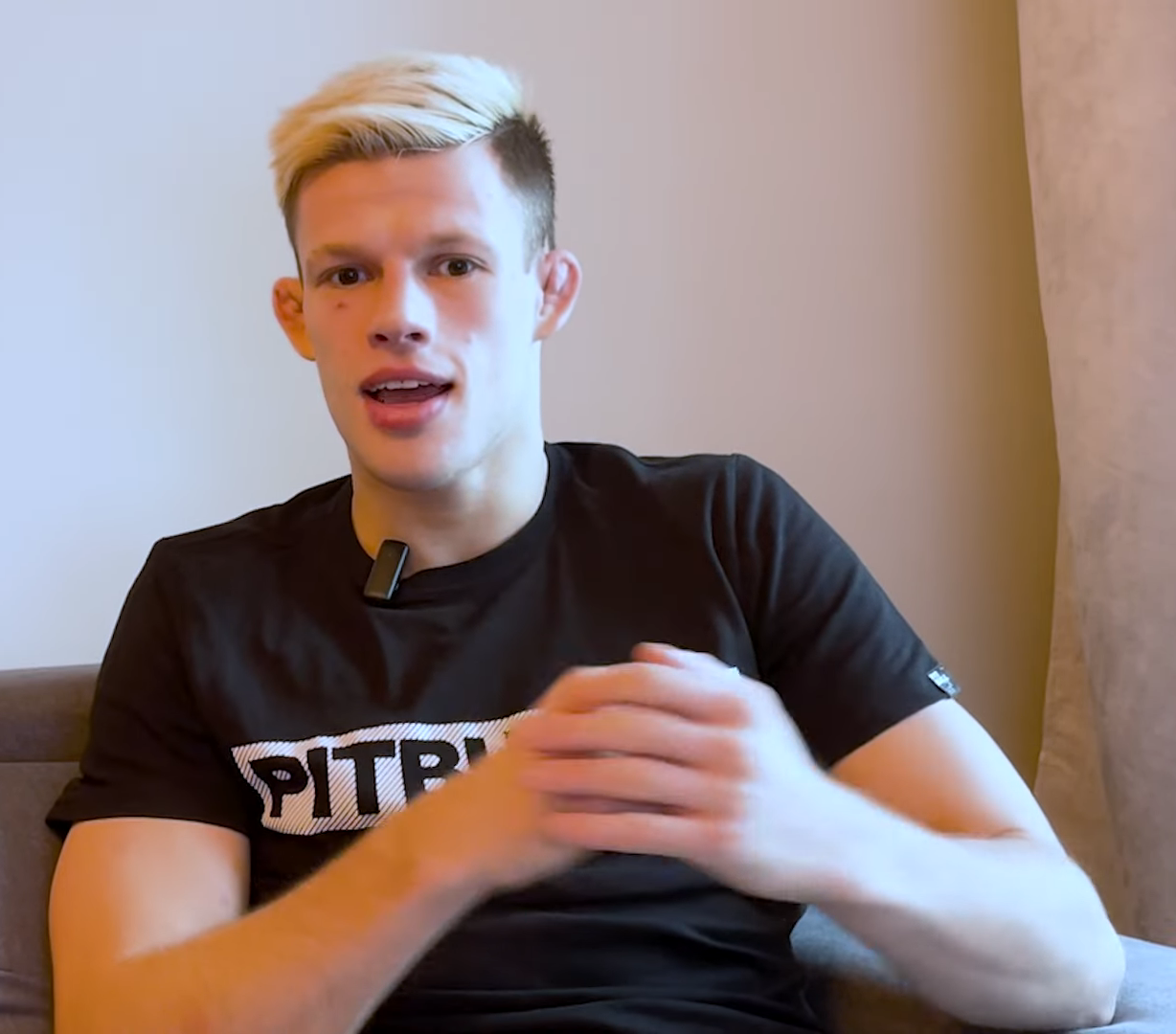
- Wikłacz in 2024
- Born: Jakub Wikłacz; September 10, 1996 (age 30); Olsztyn, Warmian–Masurian Voivodeship, Poland
- Nickname: Masa
- Nationality: Polish
- Height: 5 ft 10 in (178 cm)
- Weight: 135.5 lb (61 kg; 9 st 10 lb)
- Division: Bantamweight (2015-present); Flyweight (2014-2015)
- Reach: 72 in (183 cm)
- Fighting out of: Poznań, Greater Poland, Poland; Coconut Creek, Florida, U.S.
- Team: Arrachion Olsztyn (2014-2022); Czerwony Smok Poznań (2022-present); American Top Team (2023-present)
- Teacher: Robert Drysdale
- Trainer: Bartosz Jezierski
- Rank: 1st degree black belt in Brazilian jiu-jitsu under Robert Drysdale
- Years active: 2014-present

Mixed martial arts record
- Total: 23
- Wins: 18
- By submission: 11
- By decision: 7
- Losses: 3
- By knockout: 2
- By submission: 1
- Draws: 2

Other information
- Occupation: Mixed martial artist and grappler
- Mixed martial arts record from Sherdog

Jakub Wikłacz (Polish pronunciation: [/ˈja.kup ˈvi.kwat͡ʂ/]; born September 10, 1996), is a Polish mixed martial artist and Brazilian jiu-jitsu practitioner. A professional mixed martial artist since 2014, he currently competes in the Bantamweight division of the Ultimate Fighting Championship (UFC). He formerly competed in the Bantamweight division of Konfrontacja Sztuk Walki (KSW), where he was the former and longest-reigning KSW Bantamweight Champion.

== Early life ==
Jakub Wikłacz was born on September 10, 1996, in Olsztyn, Warmian–Masurian Voivodeship, Republic of Poland. In his youth, Wikłacz trained in judo at the age of 7 and had started training MMA around the age of 13, attending the Arrachion Olsztyn gym in the aforementioned city of Olsztyn, and had his first amateur competitions in 2011. Jakub, in his teenage years, was an registered culinary student, but eventually dropped out to train in combat sports full-time.

== Amateur career ==
Wikłacz had started competing in amateur mixed martial arts in 2011, with him placing second in the national championships in Teresin. In the next year, Wikłacz placed second and third in multiple regional championships. In 2013, he placed first at the Polish Northern championships, and in 2014, he placed first at the Central Poland Cup, and the Polish National championships in Żyrardów. He ended his career when he debuted in professional MMA in the same year.

== Mixed martial arts career ==
=== Early career ===
Wikłacz debuted in professional mixed martial arts at the age of 17. He balanced a record of 10 wins, 2 losses, and one draw, competing in multiple regional promotions, and Absolute Championship Berkut (ACB).

=== KSW career ===
Jakub debuted in Konfrontacja Sztuk Walki (KSW) at KSW 53, where he faced Sebastian Przybysz in a rematch, on July 11, 2020. He lost the fight via TKO in the third round, due to punches in the body.

In his next fight, Wikłacz faced Patryk Surdyn at KSW 65, on April 24, 2021. He won the fight by unanimous decision.

Wikłacz faced the former KSW Bantamweight and FFC Featherweight Champion, Antun Račić, at KSW 63, on September 4, 2021. He won the fight via submission in the first round, due to a guillotine choke. After the pay-per-view concluded, Jakub was awarded his first Submission of the Night honor.

Jakub fought Bruno Augusto dos Santos at KSW 71, on June 18, 2022. He won the fight by unanimous decision.

==== KSW Bantamweight Champion ====
In his next fight, Wikłacz fought Sebastian Przybysz, in a rematch, for the KSW Bantamweight Championship. They fought at KSW 77, on December 17, 2022. He won the fight by split decision, winning the Bantamweight title in the process. After the event concluded, he, along with Sebastian, were awarded their first Fight of the Night award.

Jakub was originally scheduled to defend his title against Zuriko Jojua at KSW 83, on June 3, 2023. However, Zuriko pulled out of the fight due to a knee ligament injury. In a short notice announcement, Jakub was scheduled to face Werlleson Martins at the same date, but Werlleson weighed in 5 kg over the bantamweight title limit, and was hospitalized over his weight cut, shutting off the fight. Wikłacz was then offered a non-title bout at 70 kg, but declined the offer and the overall fight was scrapped, being replaced by another bout on the card.

Wikłacz was scheduled to face former Bantamweight champion, Sebastian Przybysz, in a third rematch, for the KSW Bantamweight Championship, at KSW 86, on September 16, 2023. The bout ended in a technical draw, after an illegal kick to the head of Sebastian, who was grounded, rendered him unable to continue the fight. Jakub retained the title in the process.

In his next title defense, Jakub Wikłacz was scheduled to face Zuriko Jojua the second time, at KSW 92, on March 16, 2024. He won the fight by unanimous decision, and the bout was given his second Fight of the Night honor.

He fought against Sebastian Przybysz, in a rematch, for the KSW Bantamweight Championship, at KSW 95, on June 7, 2024. He won the fight by submission in the second round, due to a guillotine choke. After the event concluded, the bout was given both the Fight of the Night, and the Submission of the Night awards.

==== Release from KSW and signing with the UFC ====
On December 16, 2024, Konfrontacja Sztuk Walki announced the departure of Jakub Wikłacz from their roster, signifying a mutual termination of their contract, in order for Jakub to sign to the UFC, and the Bantamweight title that he held was vacated in the process. Months later, on June 19, 2025, it was reported and officially announced that both Wikłacz and the former two-time interim KSW Featherweight Champion, Robert Ruchała, had signed with the UFC.

=== UFC career ===
Wikłacz debuted at UFC 320, on October 4, 2025. He faced the former undisputed and interim Bellator Bantamweight World Champion, Patchy Mix, winning the bout by split decision.

Wikłacz fought against the former LFA Bantamweight Champion, Muin Gafurov, at UFC Fight Night: Bautista vs. Oliveira, on February 7, 2026. After a dramatic and close fight, Wikłacz won via submission at the last second of the third round, due to a guillotine choke. After the event ended, Wikłacz was given his first Performance of the Night bonus in the promotion.

Jakub Wikłacz was originally scheduled to face Marcus McGhee at UFC Fight Night: Muhammad vs. Bonfim, on June 5, 2026. However, it was reported that Jakub pulled out of the fight due to a serious arm injury.

== Personal life and relationships ==
Wikłacz is close friends with the former UFC Women's Strawweight Champion, Joanna Jędrzejczyk, where he was a main sparring partner of hers at Arrachion Olsztyn, even being mentioned in her octagon interview after she defeated Jessica Penne, that the 18-year old Jakub was going to be a world champion. Joanna was a major contributor to the contract negotiations of Jakub and Robert Ruchała with the UFC. She is a current coach of Jakub and is a part of his corner.

== Grappling career ==
=== 2017 ===
Jakub officially started competing in grappling under his training in Judo when he was a child. Wikłacz made his official debut in Brazilian jiu-jitsu competitions in 2017, where he placed second in the under 70 kg adult purple belt division at the 13th Polish BJJ Championships, in the gi category.

=== 2018 ===
A year later, Wikłacz attended the 14th edition of the Polish BJJ Championships in Gniezno, placing second in the -76 kg adult purple belt category. In the same year of 2018, Wikłacz was scheduled to participate in the 5th edition of the Octopus BJJ Cup in Łódź, where he placed first in the adult -76 kg purple belt division.

=== 2019 ===
Jakub made his No-Gi debut at the 15th Polish ADCC Cup in Warsaw, where he won the gold medal at the -70 kg advanced category.

=== 2020 ===
Wikłacz returned to the Polish BJJ Championships in 2020, competing in their adult -76 kg brown belt division, where he placed first in the gi category.

=== 2021 ===
Jakub returned to No-Gi competition, competing in the 11th Polish No-Gi Jiu-Jitsu Cup in Luboń, where he placed first at the -73.5 kg brown belt category. Later in the year, he competed at the 16th edition of the aforementioned Polish ADCC Cup in Warsaw, where he won bronze at the -76.9 kg pro division.

=== 2023 ===
On June 25, 2023, Jakub was promoted to 1st degree black belt under the Brazilian and American jiu-jitsu practitioner and former mixed martial artist, Robert Drysdale, in the Zenith BJJ Camp.

=== 2024 ===
Wikłacz made his black belt debut in gi competition at the 20th edition of the Polish BJJ Championships, placing third in the -70 kg black belt division.

=== 2026 ===
Upon an last-minute invitation, Jakub was scheduled to compete at the 28th edition of the ADCC Submission Fighting World Championship, as he competed in their -66 kg pro division, ranked as the #16th seed. In the round of 16, Jakub faced Diego "Pato" Oliveira. He lost the bout by submission in the 7th minute.

== Championships and accomplishments ==
=== Mixed martial arts ===
==== Professional ====
- Konfrontacja Sztuk Walki
  - KSW Bantamweight Championship (One time)
    - Three successful title retainments (Two consecutive title defenses)
  - Fight of the Night (Three times) vs. Sebastian Przybysz (2022 & 2024), and Zuriko Jojua
  - Submission of the Night (Two times) vs. Antun Račić and Sebastian Przybysz
- Ultimate Fighting Championship
  - Performance of the Night (One time) vs. Muin Gafurov

==== Amateur ====
2012

- (silver) Polish Amateur MMA Championships (-56 kg)

2014

- (gold) Polish Amateur MMA Championships (-61 kg) (full contact)

=== Grappling ===
==== Gi Brazilian jiu-jitsu ====
2017

- (silver) Polish BJJ Championships (-70 kg; Purple)

2018

- (silver) Polish BJJ Championships (-76 kg; Purple)
  (gold) Octopus BJJ Cup (-76 kg; Purple)

2020

- (gold) Polish BJJ Championships (-76 kg; Brown)

2024

- (bronze) Polish BJJ Championships (-70 kg; Black)

==== No-Gi Brazilian jiu-jitsu ====
2019

- (gold) Polish ADCC Cup (-70 kg; Advanced)

2021

- (gold) Polish No-Gi Jiu-Jitsu Cup (-73.5 kg; Brown)
  (bronze) Polish ADCC Cup (-76.9 kg; Pro)

== Mixed martial arts record ==
Professional record breakdown
23 matches	18 wins	3 losses
By knockout	0	2
By submission	11	1
By decision	7	0
Draws	2	

Res.	Record	Opponent	Method	Event	Date	Round	Time	Location	Notes
Win	18–3–2	Muin Gafurov	Submission (guillotine choke)	UFC Fight Night: Bautista vs. Oliveira	February 7, 2026	3	4:59	Las Vegas, Nevada, United States	Catchweight (141 lb) bout; Gafurov missed weight. Performance of the Night.
Win	17–3–2	Patchy Mix	Decision (split)	UFC 320	October 4, 2025	3	5:00	Las Vegas, Nevada, United States	
Win	16–3–2	Sebastian Przybysz	Technical Submission (guillotine choke)	KSW 95	June 7, 2024	2	3:15	Olsztyn, Poland	Defended the KSW Bantamweight Championship. Submission of the Night. Fight of the Night. Later vacated the title on Dec 16, 2024.
Win	15–3–2	Zuriko Jojua	Decision (unanimous)	KSW 92	March 16, 2024	5	5:00	Gorzów Wielkopolski, Poland	Defended the KSW Bantamweight Championship. Fight of the Night.
Draw	14–3–2	Sebastian Przybysz	Technical Decision (unanimous draw)	KSW 86	September 16, 2023	4	4:15	Wrocław, Poland	Retained the KSW Bantamweight Championship. An accidental illegal soccer kick rendered Przybysz unable to continue.
Win	14–3–1	Sebastian Przybysz	Decision (split)	KSW 77	December 17, 2022	5	5:00	Gliwice, Poland	Won the KSW Bantamweight Championship. Fight of the Night.
Win	13–3–1	Bruno dos Santos	Decision (unanimous)	KSW 71	June 19, 2022	3	5:00	Toruń, Poland	
Win	12–3–1	Antun Račić	Submission (guillotine choke)	KSW 63	September 4, 2021	1	1:57	Warsaw, Poland	Submission of the Night.
Win	11–3–1	Patryk Surdyn	Decision (unanimous)	KSW 60	April 24, 2021	3	5:00	Łódź, Poland	
Loss	10–3–1	Sebastian Przybysz	TKO (punches to the body)	KSW 53	July 11, 2020	3	1:18	Warsaw, Poland	
Win	10–2–1	Nikolay Kondratyuk	Submission (rear-naked choke)	Eagles FC: Next Level	February 15, 2020	1	2:28	Ciorescu, Moldova	
Win	9–2–1	Gheorghe Lupu	Submission (triangle choke)	Eagles FC: Elimination	October 26, 2019	2	2:34	Chișinău, Moldova	
Win	8–2–1	Simone D'Anna	Submission (triangle choke)	Celtic Gladiator 20	April 28, 2018	1	1:40	Olsztyn, Poland	
Win	7–2–1	Piotr Wróblewski	Submission (guillotine choke)	Spartan Fight 9	December 2, 2017	2	0:38	Chorzów, Poland	
Win	6–2–1	Błażej Majdan	Submission (rear-naked choke)	Spartan Fight 8	September 23, 2017	1	2:03	Kraków, Poland	
Win	5–2–1	Sebastian Przybysz	Decision (unanimous)	ACB 63	July 1, 2027	3	5:00	Gdańsk, Poland	
Loss	4–2–1	Dukvaha Astamirov	TKO (punches)	ACB 53	February 18, 2017	2	4:58	Olsztyn, Poland	
Loss	4–1–1	Dawid Gralka	Submission (heel hook)	Spartan Fight 6	December 17, 2016	1	0:58	Plock, Poland	
Win	4–0–1	Azamat Mustafaev	Submission (guillotine choke)	Spartan Fight 5	October 8, 2016	1	1:37	Kraków, Poland	Catchweight (139 lb) bout.
Draw	3–0–1	Marcin Bilman	Draw (majority)	Makowski FC 8	September 12, 2015	3	5:00	Zielona Góra, Poland	Bantamweight debut.
Win	3–0	Adrian Biniecki	Submission (rear-naked choke)	PLMMA 54	April 24, 2015	1	4:45	Włocławek, Poland	
Win	2–0	Igor Wojtas	Decision (split)	Gladiator Arena 7	November 14, 2014	3	5:00	Pyrzyce, Poland	
Win	1–0	Nickolas Kosmel	Submission (armbar)	Fighters Arena 9	June 8, 2014	1	0:58	Józefów, Poland	Flyweight debut.

== See also ==
- List of current UFC fighters
- List of male mixed martial artists
