= 2019 in Konfrontacja Sztuk Walki =

Mixed martial arts events

Information
- First date: March 23, 2019
- Last date: December 7, 2019

Events
- Total events: 6

Fights
- Total fights: 53
- Title fights: 9

Chronology
2018 in KSW	2019 in Konfrontacja Sztuk Walki	2020 in KSW

The year 2019 was the 16th year in the history of the Konfrontacja Sztuk Walki, a mixed martial arts promotion based in Poland. 2019 began with KSW 47.

== List of events ==
#	Event Title	Date	Arena	Location
1	KSW 47: The X-Warriors	March 23, 2019	Atlas Arena	Łódź, Poland
2	KSW 48: Szymański vs. Parnasse	April 27, 2019	Globus Hall	Lublin, Poland
3	KSW 49: Soldić vs. Kaszubowski	May 18, 2019	Ergo Arena	Gdańsk, Poland
4	KSW 50: London	September 14, 2019	Wembley Arena	London, England
5	KSW 51: Zagreb	November 9, 2019	Arena Zagreb	Zagreb, Croatia
6	KSW 52: Race	December 7, 2019	Gliwice Arena	Gliwice, Poland

== Title fights ==
Title fights in 2019
#	Weight Class				Method	Round	Time	Event	Notes
1	Heavyweight 120 kg	(England) Phil De Fries (c)	def.	(Poland) Tomasz Narkun	Decision (Unanimous)	5	5:00	KSW 47	For the KSW Heavyweight Championship
2	Featherweight 66 kg	(France) Salahdine Parnasse	def.	(Poland) Roman Szymański	TKO (Punches)	2	3:39	KSW 48	For the Interim KSW Featherweight Championship
3	Welterweight 77 kg	(Croatia) Roberto Soldić (c)	def.	(Poland) Krystian Kaszubowski	KO (Punch)	1	1:25	KSW 49	For the KSW Welterweight Championship
4	Middleweight 84 kg	(England) Scott Askham	def.	(Poland) Michał Materla	KO (Knees)	3	1:23	KSW 49	For the Vacant KSW Middleweight Championship
5	Heavyweight 120 kg	(England) Phil De Fries (c)	def.	(Brazil) Luis Henrique	Decision (Split)	5	5:00	KSW 50	For the KSW Heavyweight Championship
6	Light Heavyweight 93 kg	(Poland) Tomasz Narkun (c)	def.	(Poland) Przemyslaw Mysiala	Submission (Guillotine Choke)	1	0:47	KSW 50	For the KSW Light Heavyweight Championship
7	Lightweight 70 kg	(Northern Ireland) Norman Parke	def.	(Poland) Marcin Wrzosek	Decision (Split)	5	5:00	KSW 50	For the Interim KSW Lightweight Championship
8	Bantamweight 61 kg	(Croatia) Antun Račić	def.	(Poland) Damian Stasiak	Decision (Unanimous)	5	5:00	KSW 51	For the inaugural KSW Bantamweight Championship
9	Featherweight 66 kg	(France) Salahdine Parnasse	def.	(Slovakia) Ivan Buchinger	Decision (Unanimous)	5	5:00	KSW 52	For the Interim KSW Featherweight Championship

== KSW Middleweight Championship Tournament bracket ==
Semi-Finals; KSW 45
(Poland) Michał Materla	TKO
(Poland) Damian Janikowski	1r.
(England) Scott Askham	KO
(Poland) Marcin Wójcik	1r.

Final; KSW 49
(Poland) Michał Materla	3r.
(England) Scott Askham	KO

== KSW 47: The X-Warriors ==
KSW 47: The X-Warriors
- Promotion: Konfrontacja Sztuk Walki
- Date: March 23, 2019
- Venue: Atlas Arena
- City: Łódź, Poland

Event chronology
KSW 46	KSW 47: The X-Warriors

'KSW 47: The X-Warriors' was a mixed martial arts event held by Konfrontacja Sztuk Walki on March 23, 2019 at the Atlas Arena in Łódź, Poland.

=== Background ===
The event was headlined by a KSW Heavyweight Championship bout between the champion Phil De Fries and KSW Light Heavyweight Champion Tomasz Narkun.

A heavyweight superfight between the five-time World's Strongest Man Mariusz Pudzianowski and Olympic weightlifting gold medalist Szymon Kolecki took place as the co-main event.

Dricus du Plessis was scheduled to fight against fellow former welterweight champion Borys Mankowski at KSW 47. However, du Plessis was forced off the card due to a weight issue. Norman Parke has stepped in on short notice for du Plessis to fight former welterweight champion.

Bonus awards

The following fighters were awarded bonuses:

- Fight of the Night: Borys Mańkowski vs. Norman Parke
- Knockout of the Night: Aleksandar Ilić
- Performance of the Night: Aleksandar Ilić

=== Results ===
KSW 47
Weight Class				Method	Round	Time	Notes
Heavyweight 120 kg	(England) Phil De Fries (c)	def.	(Poland) Tomasz Narkun	Decision (Unanimous)	5	5:00	For the KSW Heavyweight Championship
Heavyweight 120 kg	(Poland) Szymon Kołecki	def.	(Poland) Mariusz Pudzianowski	TKO (Injury)	1	4:20	
Welterweight 77 kg	(Northern Ireland) Norman Parke	def.	(Poland) Borys Mańkowski	Decision (Unanimous)	3	5:00	
Heavyweight 120 kg	(Japan) Satoshi Ishii	def.	(Brazil) Fernando Rodrigues Jr.	Decision (Split)	3	5:00	
Middleweight 84 kg	(Serbia) Aleksandar Ilić	def.	(Poland) Damian Janikowski	KO (Head Kick)	3	0:23	
Featherweight 66 kg	(Poland) Marcin Wrzosek	def.	(Poland) Krzysztof Klaczek	Decision (Unanimous)	3	5:00	
Flyweight 57 kg	(Poland) Karolina Owczarz	def.	(Poland) Marta Chojnoska	Decision (Split)	3	5:00	
Lightweight 70 kg	(Poland) Maciej Kazieczko	def.	(Poland) Bartłomiej Kopera	Decision (Majority)	3	5:00	
Bantamweight 61 kg	(Poland) Paweł Polityło	def.	(Poland) Dawid Gralka	TKO (Punches)	2	3:52	

== KSW 48: Szymański vs. Parnasse ==
KSW 48: Parnasse vs. Szymański
- Promotion: Konfrontacja Sztuk Walki
- Date: April 27, 2019
- Venue: Globus Hall
- City: Lublin, Poland

'KSW 48: Parnasse vs. Szymański' will be a mixed martial arts event held by Konfrontacja Sztuk Walki on April 27, 2019 at the Globus Hall in Lublin, Poland.

=== Background ===
Bonus awards

The following fighters were awarded bonuses:

- Fight of the Night: Michał Michalski vs. Savo Lazić
- Knockout of the Night: Filip Pejić

=== Results ===
KSW 48
Weight Class				Method	Round	Time	Notes
Featherweight 66 kg	(France) Salahdine Parnasse	def.	(Poland) Roman Szymański	TKO (Punches)	2	3:39	For the Interim KSW Featherweight Championship
Light Heavyweight 93 kg	(Poland) Łukasz Jurkowski	def.	(Croatia) Stjepan Bekavac	TKO (Injury)	1	1:06	
Lightweight 70 kg	(Poland) Marian Ziółkowski	def.	(Poland) Gracjan Szadziński	Decision (Unanimous)	3	5:00	
Featherweight 66 kg	(Croatia) Filip Pejić	def.	(Poland) Filip Wolański	KO (Head Kick and Punches)	2	1:55	
Welterweight 77 kg	(Poland) Michał Michalski	def.	(Montenegro) Savo Lazić	KO (Punches)	2	2:23	
Middleweight 84 kg	(Poland) Cezary Kęsik	def.	(Poland) Jakub Kamieniarz	TKO (Elbows)	1	3:04	
Lightweight 70 kg	(Russia) Shamil Musaev	def.	(Poland) Hubert Szymajda	TKO (Punches)	1	3:52	
Bantamweight 61 kg	(Poland) Sebastian Przybysz	def.	(Romania) Bogdan Barbu	TKO (Punches)	1	4:00	

== KSW 49: Soldić vs. Kaszubowski ==
KSW 49: Soldić vs. Kaszubowski
- Promotion: Konfrontacja Sztuk Walki
- Date: May 18, 2019
- Venue: Ergo Arena
- City: Gdańsk/Sopot, Poland

'KSW 49: Soldić vs. Kaszubowski' was a mixed martial arts event held by Konfrontacja Sztuk Walki on May 18, 2019 at the Ergo Arena in Gdańsk/Sopot, Poland.

Bonus awards

The following fighters were awarded bonuses:

- Fight of the Night: Scott Askham vs. Michał Materla
- Knockout of the Night: Roberto Soldić
- Performance of the Night: Martin Zawada

=== Results ===
KSW 49
Weight Class				Method	Round	Time	Notes
Welterweight 77 kg	(Croatia) Roberto Soldić (c)	def.	(Poland) Krystian Kaszubowski	KO (Punch)	1	1:25	For the KSW Welterweight Championship
Middleweight 84 kg	(England) Scott Askham	def.	(Poland) Michał Materla	KO (Knees)	3	1:23	For the Vacant KSW Middleweight Championship
Heavyweight 120 kg	(Poland) Damian Grabowski	def.	(Poland) Karol Bedorf	TKO (Punches)	2	3:56	
Welterweight 77 kg	(Northern Ireland) Norman Parke	def.	(Poland) Artur Sowiński	Decision (Unanimous)	3	5:00	
Heavyweight 120 kg	(Bosnia and Herzegovina) Erko Jun	def.	(Poland) Akop Szostak	TKO (Punches)	1	0:37	
Light Heavyweight 93 kg	(Germany) Martin Zawada	def.	(Brazil) Thiago Silva	Decision (Unanimous)	3	5:00	
Bantamweight 61 kg	(Croatia) Antun Račić	def.	(Poland) Paweł Polityło	Decision (Split)	3	5:00	
Heavyweight 120 kg	(Brazil) Luis Henrique	def.	(Poland) Michał Andryszak	Technical Submission (Guillotine Choke)	2	4:51	
Lightweight 70 kg	(Poland) Leszek Krakowski	def.	(France) Michael Dubois	Decision (Majority)	3	5:00	

== KSW 50: London ==
KSW 50: London
- Promotion: Konfrontacja Sztuk Walki
- Date: September 14, 2019
- Venue: Wembley Arena
- City: London, England

'KSW 50: London' was a mixed martial arts event held by Konfrontacja Sztuk Walki on September 14, 2019 at the Wembley Arena in London, England.

=== Background ===
Marian Ziolkowski has been forced to withdraw from his scheduled interim KSW Lightweight Championship bout against Norman Parke due to knee injury. Parke instead faced the former KSW Featherweight Championshion Marcin Wrzosek, who stepped in on two weeks’ notice for this encounter.

Phil De Fries was expected to defend his Heavyweight Championship against Damian Grabowski in the main event of the evening. However, Grabowski was forced off the card due to a hand injury. Luis Henrique has stepped in for the injured Grabowski to fight De Fries for the heavyweight title.

Patrik Kincl has been forced to withdraw from his scheduled KSW Welterweight Championship bout against Roberto Soldić due to a torn ligament in his arm. Soldić instead faced Michal Pietrzak, who stepped in on four days’ notice for this encounter. Instead of a welterweight title fight, the fight was 80 kg catchweight bout.

Bonus awards

The following fighters were awarded bonuses:

- Fight of the Night: Norman Parke vs. Marcin Wrzosek
- Knockout of the Night: Aleksandra Rola
- Submission of the Night: Tomasz Narkun

=== Results ===
KSW 50
Weight Class				Method	Round	Time	Notes
Heavyweight 120 kg	(England) Phil De Fries (c)	def.	(Brazil) Luis Henrique	Decision (Split)	5	5:00	For the KSW Heavyweight Championship
Light Heavyweight 93 kg	(Poland) Tomasz Narkun (c)	def.	(Poland) Przemyslaw Mysiala	Submission (Guillotine Choke)	1	4:07	For the KSW Light Heavyweight Championship
Catchweight 80 kg	(Croatia) Roberto Soldić	def.	(Poland) Michal Pietrzak	Decision (Unanimous)	3	5:00	
Lightweight 70 kg	(Northern Ireland) Norman Parke	def.	(Poland) Marcin Wrzosek	Decision (Split)	5	5:00	For the Interim KSW Lightweight Championship
Middleweight 84 kg	(Poland) Damian Janikowski	def.	(England) Tony Giles	TKO (Submission to punches)	1	1:24	
Middleweight 84 kg	(England) Jason Radcliffe	def.	(Poland) Antoni Chmielewski	Decision (Unanimous)	3	5:00	
Middleweight 84 kg	(South Africa) Dricus du Plessis	def.	(Brazil) Joilton Santos	TKO (Punches)	2	3:01	
Strawweight 52 kg	(Poland) Aleksandra Rola	def.	(Republic of Ireland) Catherine Costigan	TKO (Elbows)	2	0:50	

== KSW 51: Croatia ==
KSW 51: Croatia
- Promotion: Konfrontacja Sztuk Walki
- Date: November 9, 2019
- Venue: Arena Zagreb
- City: Zagreb, Croatia

'KSW 51: Croatia' was a mixed martial arts event held by Konfrontacja Sztuk Walki on November 9, 2019 at the Arena Zagreb in Zagreb, Croatia.

=== Background ===
Krzysztof Klaczek had to withdraw from his match with Filip Pejić due to injuries sustained during training. Daniel Torres replaces Klaczek, he takes his place against Pejić.

Denis Stojnić has been forced to withdraw from his scheduled bout against Ante Delija due to an injury. Delija instead faced Oli Thompson, who stepped in on two days’ notice for this encounter.

Aleksandar Rakas was scheduled to face Krystian Kaszubowski on the main card, but Rakas had to withdraw from the fight when he suffered a foot injury due to a slip a day before the fight while walking his dog. Ivica Truscek stepped in on a day notice to face Kaszubowski.

Bonus awards

The following fighters were awarded bonuses:

- Fight of the Night: Sebastian Przybysz vs. Lemmy Krušič
- Knockout of the Night: Ivan Erslan
- Submission of the Night: Borys Mańkowski

=== Results ===
KSW 51
Weight Class				Method	Round	Time	Notes
Heavyweight 120 kg	(Poland) Mariusz Pudzianowski	def.	(Bosnia and Herzegovina) Erko Jun	TKO (Punches)	2	1:43	
Catchweight 73 kg	(Poland) Borys Mańkowski	def.	(Montenegro) Vaso Bakočević	Submission (Anaconda Choke)	1	3:36	
Bantamweight 61 kg	(Croatia) Antun Račić	def.	(Poland) Damian Stasiak	Decision (Unanimous)	5	5:00	For the inaugural KSW Bantamweight Championship
Featherweight 66 kg	(Brazil) Daniel Torres	def.	(Croatia) Filip Pejić	Decision (Unanimous)	3	5:00	
Heavyweight 120 kg	(Croatia) Ante Delija	def.	(England) Oli Thompson	TKO (Punches)	2	1:58	
Middleweight 84 kg	(Poland) Cezary Kęsik	def.	(Serbia) Aleksandar Ilić	Submission (Rear-Naked Choke)	2	4:26	
Light Heavyweight 93 kg	(Croatia) Ivan Erslan	def.	(Spain) Darwin Rodriguez	TKO (Punches)	1	1:29	
Lightweight 70 kg	(Poland) Roman Szymański	def.	(Montenegro) Miloš Janičić	Decision (Unanimous)	3	5:00	
Welterweight 77 kg	(Poland) Krystian Kaszubowski	def.	(Croatia) Ivica Trušček	Decision (Split)	3	5:00	
Bantamweight 61 kg	(Poland) Sebastian Przybysz	def.	(Slovenia) Lemmy Krušič	Decision (Unanimous)	3	5:00	

== KSW 52: Race ==
KSW 52: Race
- Promotion: Konfrontacja Sztuk Walki
- Date: December 7, 2019
- Venue: Gliwice Arena
- City: Gliwice, Poland

Event chronology
KSW 52: Race	KSW 53: Reborn

'KSW 52: Race' was mixed martial arts event held by Konfrontacja Sztuk Walki on December 7, 2019 at the Gliwice Arena in Gliwice, Poland.

=== Background ===
Bonus awards

The following fighters were awarded bonuses:

- Fight of the Night: Michał Michalski vs. Albert Odzimkowski
- Knockout of the Night: Maciej Kazieczko
- Submission of the Night: Karolina Owczarz
- Performance of the Night: Salahdine Parnasse

=== Results ===
KSW 52: Race
Weight Class				Method	Round	Time	Notes
Catchweight 85 kg	(England) Scott Askham	def.	(Poland) Mamed Khalidov	Decision (Unanimous)	3	5:00	
Catchweight 91,5 kg	(Poland) Szymon Kołecki	def.	(Poland) Damian Janikowski	TKO (Punches)	2	3:02	
Featherweight 66 kg	(France) Salahdine Parnasse (ic)	def.	(Slovakia) Ivan Buchinger	Decision (Unanimous)	5	5:00	For the KSW Interim Featherweight Championship
Lightweight 70 kg	(Russia) Shamil Musaev	def.	(Poland) Grzegorz Szulakowski	TKO (Spinning Backfist)	1	1:17	
Flyweight 57 kg	(Poland) Karolina Owczarz	def.	(Poland) Aleksandra Rola	Submission (Triangle Choke)	2	4:35	
Lightweight 70 kg	(Poland) Artur Sowiński	def.	(Brazil) Vinicius Bohrer	TKO (Head Kick and Punches)	1	0:51	
Welterweight 77 kg	(Poland) Michał Michalski	def.	(Poland) Albert Odzimkowski	TKO (Punches)	1	4:23	
Lightweight 70 kg	(Poland) Maciej Kazieczko	def.	(France) Michael Dubois	KO (Punches)	1	0:24	
Heavyweight 120 kg	(Poland) Michał Włodarek	def.	(Croatia) Srđan Marović	KO (Punches)	1	0:33	

== See also ==
- 2019 in UFC
- 2019 in Bellator MMA
- 2019 in ONE Championship
- 2019 in M-1 Global
- 2019 in Absolute Championship Akhmat
- 2019 in RXF
