= Damian Piwowarczyk =

Polish mixed martial artist (born 1997)

- Born: Damian Piwowarczyk; 14 September 1997 (age 29); Białogard, Poland
- Other names: Damsyn
- Height: 6 ft 6 in (1.98 m)
- Weight: 205 lb (93 kg; 14 st 9 lb)
- Division: Light Heavyweight (2019–present)
- Reach: 78.7 in (200 cm)
- Fighting out of: Warsaw, Poland
- Team: Uniq Fight Club; Nemesis Pro Team
- Years active: 2019–present

Mixed martial arts record
- Total: 16
- Wins: 12
- By knockout: 7
- By submission: 4
- By decision: 1
- By disqualification: 0
- Losses: 4
- By knockout: 1
- By submission: 1
- By decision: 2
- No contests: 0

Other information
- Mixed martial arts record from Sherdog

Damian Piwowarczyk (born 14 September 1997) is a Polish professional mixed martial artist. He currently competes in the Light Heavyweight division of the Ultimate Fighting Championship (UFC). He has previously competed on Babilon MMA.

== Professional career ==
=== Early career ===
Piwowarczyk made his professional debut on November 23, 2019, against Seweryn Kucharski. Piwowarczyk won the fight via a Unanimous Decision.

After a year and a half long hiatus, Piwowarczyk returned to fighting, making his debut under Babilon MMA on April 30, 2021, against Sławomir Bryla. Piwowarczyk won the fight via a first-round submission.

His next fight came on June 19, 2021, against Roman Kononov in his hometown of Białogard under the federation DWM Fight Night. Piwowarczyk won the fight via a second-round TKO. Following the win, he was awarded a Konfrontacja Sztuk Walki (KSW) contract, which was given to him by then KSW Bantamweight Champion, Sebastian Przybysz.

=== Konfrontacja Sztuk Walki ===
Piwowarczyk made his debut under Konfrontacja Sztuk Walki (KSW) on September 4, 2021, against Marcin Trzciński. Piwowarczyk won the fight via a second-round submission.

His next fight came on December 18, 2021, against Marc Doussis. Piwowarczyk won the fight via a second-round submission. This performance earned him his first career Submission of the Night bonus.

His next fight came on May 28, 2022, against Bartosz Leśko. Piwowarczyk lost the fight via a Unanimous Decision.

His next fight came on August 20, 2022, against Bogdan Gnidko. Piwowarczyk lost the fight via a knockout five seconds into the fight, which set the record for quickest knockout in federation history.

His next fight came on March 17, 2023, against Bartłomiej Gładkowicz. Piwowarczyk won the fight via a first-round TKO.

His next fight came on September 16, 2023, against Łukasz Sudolski. Piwowarczyk won the fight via a first-round knockout. This performance earned him his first career Knockout of the Night bonus.

On February 24, 2024, Piwowarczyk competed in a four-man tournament for the vacant KSW Light Heavyweight Championship. In the first round, he faced Kleber Raimundo Silva. Piwowarczyk won the fight via a first-round knockout, advancing to the final round. This pefromance earned him his second career Knockout of the Night bonus. Later that evening, he faced Rafał Haratyk in the co-main event. Piwowarczyk lost the fight via a split decision, ending the tournament as the runner-up.

His next fight came on September 14, 2024, against Marcin Wójcik. Piwowarczyk lost the fight via a first-round submission.

His next fight came on February 21, 2025, against promotional newcomer Bartosz Szewczyk. Piwowarczyk won the fight via a first-round TKO.

His next fight came on June 14, 2025, against Cedric Lushima. Piwowarczyk won the fight via a first-round submission. This performance earned him his second career Submission of the Night bonus.

His next fight came on March 14, 2026, against Sergiusz Zając. Piwowarczyk won the fight via a second-round TKO. This performance earned him his third Knockout of the Night and first Fight of the Night bonus.

=== Dana White's Contender Series ===
He faced Emilio Quissua on the tenth season of Dana White's Contender Series on September 22, 2026, winning via a first-round TKO and securing a contract with the Ultimate Fighting Championship (UFC).

== Championships and accomplishments ==
=== Mixed martial arts ===
- Konfrontacja Sztuk Walki
  - Knockout of the Night (Three times)
  - Submission of the Night (Two times)
  - Fight of the Night (One time)

== Mixed martial arts record ==
Professional record breakdown
16 matches	12 wins	4 losses
By knockout	7	1
By submission	4	1
By decision	1	2

Res.	Record	Opponent	Method	Event	Date	Round	Time	Location	Notes
Win	12–4	Emilio Quissua	TKO (punches)	Dana White's Contender Series 93	September 22, 2026	1	4:55	Las Vegas, Nevada, United States	
Win	11–4	Sergiusz Zając	TKO (punches)	KSW 116	March 14, 2026	2	1:22	Gorzów Wielkopolski, Poland	Knockout of the Night. Fight of the Night.
Win	10–4	Cedric Lushima	Submission (guillotine choke)	KSW 107	June 14, 2025	1	2:05	Gdańsk, Poland	Submission of the Night.
Win	9–4	Bartosz Szewczyk	TKO (punches)	KSW 103	February 21, 2025	1	3:10	Liberec, Czech Republic	
Loss	8–4	Marcin Wójcik	Submission (rear-naked choke)	KSW 98	September 14, 2024	1	2:46	Lubin, Poland	
Loss	8–3	Rafał Haratyk	Decision (split)	KSW Epic: Khalidov vs. Adamek	February 24, 2024	3	5:00	Gliwice, Poland	KSW Light Heavyweight Tournament Final. For the vacant KSW Light Heavyweight Championship.
Win	8–2	Kleber Raimundo Silva	KO (punch to the body)	KSW Epic: Khalidov vs. Adamek	February 24, 2024	1	2:34	Gliwice, Poland	KSW Light Heavyweight Tournament Semifinal. Knockout of the Night.
Win	7–2	Łukasz Sudolski	KO (punch)	KSW 86	September 16, 2023	1	3:38	Wrocław, Poland	Knockout of the Night.
Win	6–2	Bartłomiej Gładkowicz	TKO (elbows and punches)	KSW 80	March 17, 2023	1	2:39	Lubin, Poland	
Loss	5–2	Bogdan Gnidko	KO (punch)	KSW 73	August 20, 2022	1	0:05	Warsaw, Poland	Catchweight (214 lb) bout.
Loss	5–1	Bartosz Leśko	Decision (unanimous)	KSW 70	May 28, 2022	3	5:00	Łódź, Poland	
Win	5–0	Marc Doussis	Submission (triangle armbar)	KSW 65	December 18, 2021	2	2:22	Gliwice, Poland	Submission of the Night.
Win	4–0	Marcin Trzciński	Submission (rear-naked choke)	KSW 63	September 4, 2021	2	2:06	Warsaw, Poland	
Win	3–0	Roman Kononov	TKO (punches)	Runda X: DWM Fight Night	June 19, 2021	2	1:30	Białogard, Poland	
Win	2–0	Sławomir Bryla	Submission (guillotine choke)	Babilon MMA 21	April 30, 2021	1	0:57	Warsaw, Poland	
Win	1–0	Seweryn Kucharski	Decision (unanimous)	Runda 9	November 23, 2019	3	5:00	Białogard, Poland	Light Heavyweight debut.

== See also ==
- List of current UFC fighters
- List of Dana White's Contender Series alumni
- List of male mixed martial artists
