= 2024 in Konfrontacja Sztuk Walki =

Mixed martial arts events

Information
- First date: January 20, 2024
- Last date: December 20, 2024

Events
- Total events: 13

Fights
- Total fights: 111
- Title fights: 13

Chronology
2023 in KSW	2024 in Konfrontacja Sztuk Walki	2025 in KSW

The year 2024 was the 20th anniversary of the Konfrontacja Sztuk Walki, a mixed martial arts promotion based in Poland.

== List of events ==
#	Event Title	Date	Arena	Location
1	XTB KSW 90: Wrzosek vs. Vitasović	January 20, 2024	Arena COS Torwar	Warsaw, Poland
2	KSW 91: Brichta vs. Mircea	February 17, 2024	Home Credit Arena	Liberec, Czech Republic
3	XTB KSW Epic: Khalidov vs. Adamek	February 24, 2024	Gliwice Arena	Gliwice, Poland
4	XTB KSW 92: Wikłacz vs. Jojua	March 16, 2024	Arena Gorzów	Gorzów Wielkopolski, Poland
5	XTB KSW 93: Parnasse vs. Mircea	April 6, 2024	Adidas Arena	Paris, France
6	XTB KSW 94: Bartosiński vs. Michaliszyn	May 11, 2024	Ergo Arena	Gdańsk, Poland
7	XTB KSW 95: Wikłacz vs. Przybysz 5	June 7, 2024	Hala Urania	Olsztyn, Poland
8	XTB KSW 96: Pawlak vs. Janikowski 2	July 20, 2024	Atlas Arena	Łódź, Poland
9	KSW 97: Bajor vs. Scheffel	August 24, 2024	Arena Jaskółka Tarnów	Tarnów, Poland
10	XTB KSW 98: Paczuski vs. Zerhouni	September 14, 2024	Hala RCS Sport	Lubin, Poland
11	KSW 99: Vojčák vs. Martínek	October 19, 2024	Gliwice Arena	Gliwice, Poland
12	XTB KSW 100: Khalidov vs. Bartosiński	November 16, 2024	Gliwice Arena	Gliwice, Poland
13	XTB KSW 101: Le Classique	December 20, 2024	Paris La Défense Arena	Nanterre, France

== KSW Light Heavyweight Tournament ==
=== Background ===
On January 16, 2024, KSW announced a light heavyweight tournament to select the category's next champion. Participants of the tournament included Rafał Haratyk, Damian Piwowarczyk, Kleber Raimundo Silva and Marcin Wójcik.

Semifinal
(Poland) Rafał Haratyk	TKO
(Poland) Marcin Wójcik	1
(Brazil) Kleber Raimundo Silva	1
(Poland) Damian Piwowarczyk	KO

Final
(Poland) Rafał Haratyk	SD
(Poland) Damian Piwowarczyk	3

== XTB KSW 90: Wrzosek vs. Vitasović ==
XTB KSW 90: Wrzosek vs. Vitasović
- Promotion: Konfrontacja Sztuk Walki
- Date: January 20, 2024
- Venue: Arena COS Torwar
- City: Warsaw, Poland

XTB KSW 90: Wrzosek vs. Vitasović was a mixed martial arts event held by Konfrontacja Sztuk Walki on January 20, 2024, in Warsaw, Poland.

=== Background ===
A heavyweight bout between Arkadiusz Wrzosek and current FNC Heavyweight champion Ivan Vitasović headlined the event.

Bonus awards

The following fighters were awarded bonuses:

- Submission of the Night: Ewelina Woźniak and Isai Ramos
- Knockout of the Night: Laïd Zerhouni and Adam Soldaev

=== Fight card ===
KSW 90
Weight Class				Method	Round	Time	Notes
Heavyweight 120 kg	(Poland) Arkadiusz Wrzosek	def.	(Croatia) Ivan Vitasović	TKO (Punches)	1	0:55	
Middleweight 84 kg	(France) Laïd Zerhouni	def.	(Poland) Bartosz Fabiński	KO (Punches)	1	0:12	
Featherweight 66 kg	(Poland) Adam Soldaev	def.	(Poland) Damian Stasiak	KO (Punch)	2	1:08	
Catchweight 73 kg	(Venezuela) Isai Ramos	def.	(France) Ramzan Jembiev	Submission (Armbar)	1	0:47	
Bantamweight 61 kg	(Ukraine) Oleksii Polischuck	def.	(Brazil) Werlleson Martins	KO (Punches)	2	0:50	
Women's Strawweight 52 kg	(Poland) Ewelina Woźniak	def.	(Bulgaria) Aleksandra Toncheva	Submission (Reverse Triangle Choke)	2	1:56	
Bantamweight 61 kg	(Germany) Islam Djabrailov	def.	(France) Alfan Rocher-Labes	Decision (Unanimous)	3	5:00	
Heavyweight 120 kg	(Poland) Marek Samociuk	def.	(Latvia) Oļegs Jemeļjanovs	TKO (Punches)	2	3:14	
Lightweight 70 kg	(France) Hugo Deux	def.	(Netherlands) Gino van Steenis	Decision (Unanimous)	3	5:00	
Lightweight 70 kg	(Poland) Szymon Karolczyk	def.	(Poland) Artur Krawczyk	Submission (Arm-Triangle Choke)	2	4:54	

== KSW 91: Brichta vs. Mircea ==
KSW 91: Brichta vs. Mircea
- Promotion: Konfrontacja Sztuk Walki
- Date: February 17, 2024
- Venue: Home Credit Arena
- City: Liberec, Czech Republic

KSW 91: Brichta vs. Mircea was a mixed martial arts event held by Konfrontacja Sztuk Walki on February 17, 2024, at the Home Credit Arena in Liberec, Czech Republic.

=== Background ===
The event was the KSW's third visit to the Czech Republic, and the second to the city of Liberec.

In December 2023, KSW announced that number 2 contender Valeriu Mircea and number 3 contender and Czech MMA star Leo Brichta will fight for the interim KSW Lightweight Championship in the main event.

During the gala, local fighters Dominik Humburger and Josef Štummer returned to the cage.

Bonus awards

The following fighters were awarded bonuses:

- Fight of the Night: Valeriu Mircea vs. Leo Brichta
- Submission of the Night: Josef Štummer
- Knockout of the Night: Wiktoria Czyżewska

=== Fight card ===
KSW 91
Weight Class				Method	Round	Time	Notes
Lightweight 70 kg	(Moldova) Valeriu Mircea	def.	(Czech Republic) Leo Brichta	Submission (Rear-Naked Choke)	4	2:40	For the interim KSW Lightweight Championship
Middleweight 84 kg	(Czech Republic) Dominik Humburger	def.	(Poland) Adrian Dudek	KO (Punches)	2	2:28	
Welterweight 77 kg	(Czech Republic) Matúš Juráček	def.	(Republic of Ireland) Henry Fadipe	KO (Punches)	1	4:00	
Welterweight 77 kg	(Poland) Kacper Koziorzębski	def.	(Czech Republic) Viktor Červinsky	Decision (Unanimous)	3	5:00	
Catchweight 68 kg	(Poland) Łukasz Charzewski	def.	(Poland) Michał Sobiech	Decision (Unanimous)	3	5:00	
Light Heavyweight 93 kg	(Poland) Dawid Kasperski	def.	(Czech Republic) Vasil Ducar	Decision (Unanimous)	3	5:00	
Featherweight 66 kg	(Czech Republic) Josef Štummer	def.	(Poland) Adrian Wieliczko	Submission (Triangle Choke)	2	4:20	
Bantamweight 61 kg	(Poland) Mariusz Joniak	def.	(Czech Republic) Tobiasz Le	TKO (Punches)	1	1:05	
Women's Flyweight 56 kg	(Poland) Wiktoria Czyżewska	def.	(Czech Republic) Petra Častkova	KO (Kick to the Body)	1	1:56	

== XTB KSW Epic: Khalidov vs. Adamek ==
XTB KSW Epic: Khalidov vs. Adamek
- Promotion: Konfrontacja Sztuk Walki
- Date: February 24, 2024
- Venue: Gliwice Arena
- City: Gliwice, Poland

XTB KSW Epic: Khalidov vs. Adamek was a mixed martial arts event held by Konfrontacja Sztuk Walki on February 24, 2024, at the Gliwice Arena in Gliwice, Poland.

=== Background ===
To celebrate the twentieth anniversary of the KSW brand, the XTB KSW Epic gala was announced.

On January 16, 2024, KSW announced tournament in Light heavyweight category that will select next champion in that category as Ibragim Chuzhigaev vacated belt in December. Participants of the tournament are Rafał Haratyk, Damian Piwowarczyk, Kleber Raimundo Silva and Marcin Wójcik.

Bonus awards

The following fighters were awarded bonuses:

- Fight of the Night: Muslim Tulshaev vs. Konrad Rusiński
- Knockout of the Night: Ivan Erslan and Damian Piwowarczyk

=== Fight card ===
KSW Epic
Weight Class				Method	Round	Time	Notes
Catchweight 99 kg	(Poland) Tomasz Adamek	def.	(Poland) Mamed Khalidov	TKO (Hand Injury)	3	3:00	Boxing fight
Light Heavyweight 93 kg	(Poland) Rafał Haratyk	def.	(Poland) Damian Piwowarczyk	Decision (Split)	3	5:00	KSW Light Heavyweight Tournament Final. For the vacant KSW Light Heavyweight Championship.
Heavyweight 120 kg	(England) Phil De Fries	vs.	(United States) Josh Barnett	Draw	1	10:00	Submission Fighting
Featherweight 66 kg	(Czech Republic) Václav Sivák	def.	(Poland) Michal Krolik	Decision (Unanimous)	3	3:00	Muay Thai with MMA gloves
Heavyweight 120 kg	(Serbia) Darko Stošić	def.	(Brazil) Matheus Scheffel	TKO (Punches)	1	1:12	Pride rules
Light Heavyweight 93 kg	(Poland) Rafał Haratyk	def.	(Poland) Marcin Wójcik	TKO (Punches)	1	4:05	KSW Light Heavyweight Tournament Semifinal.
Light Heavyweight 93 kg	(Poland) Damian Piwowarczyk	def.	(Brazil) Kleber Raimundo Silva	KO (Punch to the Body)	1	2:34	KSW Light Heavyweight Tournament Semifinal.
Light Heavyweight 93 kg	(Croatia) Ivan Erslan	def.	(Ukraine) Bohdan Gnidko	KO (Punch)	1	0:54	
Catchweight 82 kg	(Germany) Muslim Tulshaev	def.	(Poland) Konrad Rusiński	TKO (Soccer Kicks)	3	0:32	No Holds Barred
Lightweight 70 kg	(Poland) Piotr Kacprzak	def.	(Poland) Adam Brysz	TKO (Punches)	1	1:16	MMA in Kimono

== XTB KSW 92: Wikłacz vs. Jojua ==
XTB KSW 92
- Promotion: Konfrontacja Sztuk Walki
- Date: March 16, 2024
- Venue: Arena Gorzów
- City: (Poland) Gorzów Wielkopolski

XTB KSW 92: Wikłacz vs. Jojua was a mixed martial arts event held by Konfrontacja Sztuk Walki on March 16, 2024 at the Arena Gorzów in Gorzów Wielkopolski. Poland.

=== Background ===
A KSW Bantamweight Championship bout between reigning champion Jakub Wikłacz and #2 contender Zuriko Jojua headlined the event.

Bonus awards

The following fighters were awarded bonuses:

- Fight of the Night: Jakub Wikłacz vs. Zuriko Jojua
- Knockout of the Night: Wiktor Zalewski and Miljan Zdravković

=== Fight card ===
KSW 92
Weight Class				Method	Round	Time	Notes
Bantamweight 61 kg	(Poland) Jakub Wikłacz	def.	(Georgia (country)) Zuriko Jojua	Decision (Unanimous)	5	5:00	For the KSW Bantamweight Championship
Middleweight 84 kg	(Poland) Piotr Kuberski	def.	(Poland) Michał Materla	TKO (Punches)	1	4:55	
Featherweight 66 kg	(Poland) Daniel Rutkowski	def.	(Brazil) Julio Cesar Neves	Decision (Unanimous)	3	5:00	
Bantamweight 61 kg	(Serbia) Miljan Zdravković	def.	(Poland) Kamil Szkaradek	KO (Punches)	2	1:33	
Welterweight 77 kg	(Poland) Maciej Jewtuszko	def.	(Lithuania) Marius Žaromskis	Decision (Unanimous)	3	5:00	Retirement Fight
Welterweight 77 kg	(Poland) Wiktor Zalewski	def.	(Poland) Adrian Zielinski	TKO (Knees and Punches)	1	0:32	
Middleweight 84 kg	(Poland) Wojciech Janusz	def.	(Poland) Tomasz Jakubiec	Decision (Split)	3	5:00	
Welterweight 77 kg	(Poland) Oskar Szczepaniak	def.	(Poland) Michał Gniady	KO (Punches)	1	1:00	
Middleweight 84 kg	(Czech Republic) David Hošek	def.	(Poland) Damian Mieczkowski	TKO (Arm Injury)	1	0:44	

== XTB KSW 93: Parnasse vs. Mircea ==
XTB KSW 93: Parnasse vs. Mircea
- Promotion: Konfrontacja Sztuk Walki
- Date: April 6, 2024
- Venue: Adidas Arena
- City: Paris, France

XTB KSW 93: Parnasse vs. Mircea was a mixed martial arts event held by Konfrontacja Sztuk Walki on April 6, 2024, at the Adidas Arena in Paris, France.

=== Background ===
This event will mark the organization's debut in France.

An unification KSW Lightweight Championship bout between reigning two-division champion Salahdine Parnasse and interim champion Valeriu Mircea headlined the event.

A lightweight bout between Ramzan Jembiev and the promotional newcomer El Hadji Ndiaye was scheduled to take place at the event. However, Jembiev withdrew due to shoulder injury and was replaced in short notice by Nicolae Bivol.

Bonus awards

The following fighters were awarded bonuses:

- Submission of the Night:Laïd Zerhouni
- Knockout of the Night: Michal Martínek, Madars Fleminas and Salahdine Parnasse

=== Fight card ===
KSW 93
Weight Class				Method	Round	Time	Notes
Lightweight 70 kg	(France) Salahdine Parnasse (c)	def.	(Moldova) Valeriu Mircea (ic)	KO (Head Kick and Punches)	1	4:00	For the KSW Lightweight Championship
Lightweight 70 kg	(France) Wilson Varela	def.	(Poland) Marian Ziółkowski	TKO (Shoulder Injury)	2	2:31	
Welterweight 77 kg	(Latvia) Madars Fleminas	def.	(Poland) Artur Szczepaniak	KO (Elbow)	2	1:07	
Heavyweight 120 kg	(Czech Republic) Michal Martinek	def.	(France) Prince Aounallah	KO (Punch)	2	2:02	
Middleweight 84 kg	(France) Laïd Zerhouni	def.	(France) Boubacar Niakaté	Submission (Rear-Naked Choke)	1	3:42	
Catchweight 73 kg	(France) Aymard Guih	def.	(Argentina) Francisco Albano Barrio	Decision (Split)	3	5:00	
Bantamweight 61 kg	(France) Alfan Rocher-Labes	def.	(Switzerland) Kenji Bortoluzzi	Decision (Unanimous)	3	5:00	
Catchweight 72 kg	(France) El Hadji Ndiaye	def.	(Moldova) Nicolae Bivol	Decision (Split)	3	5:00	
Women's Flyweight 56 kg	(France) Flore Hani	def.	(Lebanon) Sandra Succar	Decision (Unanimous)	3	5:00	

== XTB KSW 94: Bartosiński vs. Michaliszyn ==
XTB KSW 94: Bartosiński vs. Michaliszyn
- Promotion: Konfrontacja Sztuk Walki
- Date: May 11, 2024
- Venue: Ergo Arena
- City: (Poland) Gdańsk

XTB KSW 94: Bartosiński vs. Michaliszyn was a mixed martial arts event held by Konfrontacja Sztuk Walki on May 11, 2024 at the Ergo Arena in Gdańsk, Poland.

=== Background ===
A rematch for the KSW Welterweight Championship between reigning champion Adrian Bartosiński and #1 contender Andrzej Grzebyk was expected to headline the event. The pairing previously fought at KSW 67 in February 2022, where Bartosiński won via submission in the second round. However, Grzebyk withdrew due to injury and was replaced by #3 contender Igor Michaliszyn.

Bonus awards

The following fighters were awarded bonuses:

- Fight of the Night: Daniel Tărchilă vs. Dawid Kareta
- Submission of the Night: Adrian Bartosiński
- Knockout of the Night: Robert Ruchała

=== Fight card ===
KSW 94
Weight Class				Method	Round	Time	Notes
Welterweight 77 kg	(Poland) Adrian Bartosiński (c)	def.	(Poland) Igor Michaliszyn	Submission (Kneebar)	3	4:50	For the KSW Welterweight Championship.
Heavyweight 120 kg	(Poland) Arkadiusz Wrzosek	def.	(Poland) Artur Szpilka	KO (Punches)	1	0:14	
Featherweight 66 kg	(Poland) Robert Ruchała	def.	(Poland) Patryk Kaczmarczyk	KO (Front Kick to the Body)	1	0:59	For the interim KSW Featherweight Championship
Featherweight 66 kg	(Poland) Kacper Formela	def.	(Bosnia and Herzegovina) Ahmed Vila	Decision (Unanimous)	3	5:00	
Heavyweight 120 kg	(Slovakia) Štefan Vojčák	def.	(Brazil) Ricardo Prasel	KO (Punch)	2	0:47	
Featherweight 66 kg	(Moldova) Daniel Tărchilă	def.	(Poland) Dawid Kareta	Decision (Unanimous)	3	5:00	
Heavyweight 120 kg	(Croatia) Ivan Vitasović	def.	(Poland) Filip Stawowy	Decision (Unanimous)	3	5:00	
Women's Flyweight 56 kg	(Portugal) Mafalda Carmona	def.	(Poland) Adrianna Kreft	Decision (Split)	3	5:00	
Heavyweight 120 kg	(Poland) Michał Turyński	def.	(Poland) Patryk Tołkaczewski	Submission (Forearm Choke)	1	4:43	
Middleweight 84 kg	(Poland) Michał Michalski	def.	(Poland) Bartosz Leśko	TKO (Punches)	1	1:46	

== XTB KSW 95: Wikłacz vs. Przybysz 5 ==
XTB KSW 95: Wikłacz vs. Przybysz 5
- Promotion: Konfrontacja Sztuk Walki
- Date: June 7, 2024
- Venue: Hala Urania
- City: Olsztyn, Poland

XTB KSW 95: Wikłacz vs. Przybysz 5 was a mixed martial arts event held by Konfrontacja Sztuk Walki on June 7, 2024 at the Hala Urania in Olsztyn, Poland.

=== Background ===
Bonus awards

The following fighters were awarded bonuses:

- Fight of the Night: Jakub Wikłacz vs. Sebastian Przybysz
- Submission of the Night: Dawid Kuczmarski and Jakub Wikłacz

=== Fight card ===
KSW 95
Weight Class				Method	Round	Time	Notes
Bantamweight 61 kg	(Poland) Jakub Wikłacz (c)	def.	(Poland) Sebastian Przybysz	Technical Submission (Guillotine Choke)	2	3:15	For the KSW Bantamweight Championship.
Heavyweight 120 kg	(England) Phil De Fries (c)	def.	(Brazil) Augusto Sakai	Decision (Unanimous)	5	5:00	For the KSW Heavyweight Championship.
Lightweight 70 kg	(Poland) Marcin Held	def.	(Poland) Roman Szymański	Decision (Unanimous)	3	5:00	
Welterweight 77 kg	(Poland) Tymoteusz Łopaczyk	def.	(Netherlands) Brian Hooi	Decision (Unanimous)	3	5:00	Łopaczyk missed weight (79.1 kg).
Welterweight 77 kg	(Poland) Oskar Szczepaniak	def.	(Poland) Adrian Zieliński	Decision (Unanimous)	3	5:00	
Bantamweight 61 kg	(Poland) Patryk Surdyn	def.	(Poland) Shamad Erzanukaev	Decision (Unanimous)	3	5:00	
Middleweight 84 kg	(Poland) Borys Dzikowski	def.	(Poland) Krystian Bielski	Decision (Split)	3	5:00	
Light Heavyweight 93 kg	(Poland) Michał Dreczkowski	def.	(Serbia) Stevan Jarić	TKO (Punches and Elbows)	1	3:29	
Welterweight 77 kg	(Poland) Dawid Kuczmarski	vs.	(France) Morgan Gbolou	Submission (Guillotine Choke)	1	1:11	

== XTB KSW 96: Pawlak vs. Janikowski 2 ==
XTB KSW 96: Pawlak vs. Janikowski 2
- Promotion: Konfrontacja Sztuk Walki
- Date: July 20, 2024
- Venue: Łódź Sport Arena
- City: Łódź, Poland

XTB KSW 96: Pawlak vs. Janikowski 2 was a mixed martial arts event held by Konfrontacja Sztuk Walki on 20 July 2024 at the Łódź Sport Arena in Łódź, Poland.

=== Background ===
Bonus awards

The following fighters were awarded bonuses:

- Fight of the Night: Welisson Paiva vs. Maciej Kazieczko
- Knockout of the Night: Adam Brysz and Marek Samociuk

=== Fight card ===
KSW 96
Weight Class				Method	Round	Time	Notes
Middleweight 84 kg	(Poland) Paweł Pawlak (c)	def.	(Poland) Damian Janikowski	Decision (Unanimous)	5	5:00	For the KSW Middleweight Championship.
Women's Strawweight 52 kg	(Brazil) Maria Silva	def.	(Poland) Ewelina Woźniak	Decision (Split)	3	5:00	
Middleweight 84 kg	(Poland) Radosław Paczuski	def.	(Poland) Kacper Karski	TKO (Leg Kick)	3	2:16	
Welterweight 77 kg	(Poland) Adam Brysz	def.	(France) Hugo Deux	KO (Spinning Back Elbow)	2	4:11	
Lightweight 70 kg	(Brazil) Welisson Paiva	def.	(Poland) Maciej Kazieczko	TKO (Punches and Knee)	3	3:43	Paiva missed weight (72 kg).
Lightweight 70 kg	(Poland) Dawid Śmiełowski	def.	(Poland) Bartłomiej Kopera	Decision (Unanimous)	3	5:00	
Heavyweight 120 kg	(Poland) Marek Samociuk	def.	(Poland) Denis Górniak	TKO (Punches)	1	2:09	
Featherweight 66 kg	(Poland) Michał Domin	def.	(Venezuela) Isai Ramos	TKO (Punches)	2	1:49	Ramos missed weight (67.2 kg).

== KSW 97: Bajor vs. Scheffel ==
KSW 97: Bajor vs. Scheffel
- Promotion: Konfrontacja Sztuk Walki
- Date: August 24, 2024
- Venue: Arena Jaskółka Tarnów
- City: Tarnów, Poland

KSW 97: Bajor vs. Scheffel was a mixed martial arts event held by Konfrontacja Sztuk Walki on August 24, 2024 at the Arena Jaskółka Tarnów in Tarnów, Poland.

=== Background ===
Bonus awards

The following fighters were awarded bonuses:

- Performance of the Night: Muslim Tulshaev
- Submission of the Night: Bruno Azevedo
- Knockout of the Night: Wiktoria Czyżewska

=== Fight card ===
KSW 97
Weight Class				Method	Round	Time	Notes
Heavyweight 120 kg	(Brazil) Matheus Scheffel	def.	(Poland) Szymon Bajor	Decision (Unanimous)	3	5:00	
Bantamweight 61 kg	(Brazil) Bruno Azevedo	def.	(Ukraine) Oleksii Polischuck	Submission (Arm Triangle Choke)	2	2:07	
Middleweight 84 kg	(Poland) Igor Michaliszyn	def.	(Brazil) Oton Jasse	Decision (Unanimous)	3	5:00	
Welterweight 77 kg	(Germany) Muslim Tulshaev	def.	(Poland) Marcin Krakowiak	TKO (Doctor Stoppage)	2	2:14	
Women's Flyweight 56 kg	(Poland) Wiktoria Czyżewska	def.	(Venezuela) Erianny Castaneda	KO (Head Kick)	1	2:09	
Middleweight 84 kg	(Poland) Albert Odzimkowski	def.	(Czech Republic) David Hošek	TKO (Punches)	1	4:12	
Light Heavyweight 93 kg	(Poland) Sergiusz Zając	def.	(Brazil) Kleber Raimundo Silva	TKO (Elbows)	1	1:36	Zając missed weight (95.4 kg).
Welterweight 77 kg	(Poland) Michał Guzik	def.	(Poland) Konrad Rusiński	Decision (Split)	3	5:00	
Lightweight 70 kg	(Poland) Krystian Blezień	def.	(France) Alvin Lowenski	Decision (Split)	3	5:00	

== XTB KSW 98: Paczuski vs. Zerhouni ==
XTB KSW 98: Paczuski vs. Zerhouni
- Promotion: Konfrontacja Sztuk Walki
- Date: September 14, 2024
- Venue: Hala RCS Sport
- City: Lubin, Poland

XTB KSW 98: Paczuski vs. Zerhouni was a mixed martial arts event held by Konfrontacja Sztuk Walki on September 14, 2024 at the Hala RCS Sport in Lubin, Poland.

=== Background ===
Bonus awards

The following fighters were awarded bonuses:

- Fight of the Night:Laïd Zerhouni vs. Radosław Paczuski
- Submission of the Night: Islam Djabrailov
- Performance of the Night: Bartosz Leśko

=== Fight card ===
KSW 98
Weight Class				Method	Round	Time	Notes
Middleweight 84 kg	(Poland) Radosław Paczuski	def.	(France) Laïd Zerhouni	TKO (Punches)	1	1:01	
Light Heavyweight 93 kg	(Poland) Marcin Wójcik	def.	(Poland) Damian Piwowarczyk	Submission (Rear-Naked Choke)	1	2:46	
Light Heavyweight 93 kg	(Poland) Bartosz Leśko	def.	(Czech Republic) Dominik Humburger	Decision (Unanimous)	3	5:00	
Light Heavyweight 93 kg	(Poland) Dawid Kasperski	def.	(Poland) Krzysztof Głowacki	Decision (Unanimous)	3	5:00	
Welterweight 77 kg	(Poland) Artur Szczepaniak	def.	(Poland) Krystian Kaszubowski	Submission (Brabo Choke)	1	1:40	
Bantamweight 61 kg	(Georgia (country)) Zuriko Jojua	def.	(Brazil) Werlleson Martins	Decision (Unanimous)	3	5:00	
Catchweight 80 kg	(Poland) Daniel Skibiński	def.	(Italy) Leonardo Damiani	Decision (Split)	3	5:00	
Bantamweight 61 kg	(Germany) Islam Djabrailov	def.	(Poland) Mariusz Joniak	Submission (Kneebar)	2	1:22	
Catchweight 80 kg	(Czech Republic) Steven Krt	def.	(Poland) Borys Borkowski	TKO (Punches)	2	2:50	
Lightweight 70 kg	(Poland) Kacper Fornalski	def.	(Poland) Aleksander Budziłek	Submission (Rear-Naked Choke)	1	4:09	

== KSW 99: Vojčák vs. Martínek ==
KSW 99: Vojčák vs. Martínek
- Promotion: Konfrontacja Sztuk Walki
- Date: October 19, 2024
- Venue: Gliwice Arena
- City: Gliwice, Poland

KSW 99: Vojčák vs. Martínek was a mixed martial arts event held by Konfrontacja Sztuk Walki on October 19, 2024 at the Gliwice Arena in Gliwice, Poland.

=== Background ===
Bonus awards

The following fighters were awarded bonuses:

- Fight of the Night: Viktor Červinský vs. Adam Niedźwiedź
- Submission of the Night: Wojciech Kazieczko
- Knockout of the Night: Stefan Vojčák

=== Fight card ===
KSW 99
Weight Class				Method	Round	Time	Notes
Heavyweight 120 kg	(Slovakia) Štefan Vojčák	def.	(Czech Republic) Michal Martinek	TKO (punches)	2	2:53	
Welterweight 77 kg	(Poland) Kacper Koziorzębski	def.	(Czech Republic) Matuš Juraček	Decision (split)	3	5:00	
Middleweight 84 kg	(Poland) Maciej Różański	def.	(Czech Republic) Vojtech Garba	Decision (unanimous)	3	5:00	
Catchweight 80 kg	(Poland) Adam Niedźwiedź	def.	(Czech Republic) Viktor Červinský	Submission (guillotine choke)	1	3:40	
Featherweight 66 kg	(Poland) Wojciech Kazieczko	def.	(Czech Republic) Josef Štummer	Submission (ninja choke)	3	4:09	
Light Heavyweight 93 kg	(Poland) Bartosz Kurek	def.	(Czech Republic) Vasil Ducár	Decision (unanimous)	3	5:00	
Women's Bantamweight 61 kg	(Czech Republic) Hanka Gelnarová	def.	(Poland) Dominika Steczkowska	Decision (split)	3	5:00	
Catchweight 68.5 kg	(Poland) Michał Sobiech	def.	(Poland) Karol Kutyła	Decision (unanimous)	3	5:00	
Bantamweight 61 kg	(Poland) Tobiasz Le	def.	(Czech Republic) Matěj Val	TKO (elbows and punches)	1	4:59	

== XTB KSW 100: Khalidov vs. Bartosiński ==
XTB KSW 100: Khalidov vs. Bartosiński
- Promotion: Konfrontacja Sztuk Walki
- Date: November 16, 2024
- Venue: Gliwice Arena
- City: Gliwice, Poland

XTB KSW 100: Khalidov vs. Bartosiński will be a mixed martial arts event held by Konfrontacja Sztuk Walki on November 16, 2024 at the Gliwice Arena in Gliwice, Poland.

=== Background ===
Bonus awards

The following fighters were awarded bonuses:

- Fight of the Night: Piotr Kuberski vs. Damian Janikowski
- Performance of the Night: Mamed Khalidov
- Knockout of the Night: Andrzej Grzebyk

=== Fight card ===
XTB KSW 100
Weight Class				Method	Round	Time	Notes
Middleweight 84 kg	(Poland) Mamed Khalidov	def.	(Poland) Adrian Bartosiński	Submission (Armbar)	2	2:48	
Heavyweight 120 kg	(England) Phil De Fries (c)	def.	(Serbia) Darko Stošić	TKO (punches)	1	4:11	For the KSW Heavyweight Championship.
Light Heavyweight 93 kg	(Poland) Rafał Haratyk (c)	def.	(Poland) Marcin Wójcik	KO (punch)	2	3:22	For the KSW Light Heavyweight Championship.
Heavyweight 120 kg	(Poland) Arkadiusz Wrzosek	def.	(Brazil) Matheus Scheffel	TKO (punches)	1	0:25	
Featherweight 66 kg	(Poland) Robert Ruchała (ic)	def.	(Poland) Kacper Formela	TKO (elbows and punches)	3	2:44	For the interim KSW Featherweight Championship
Welterweight 77 kg	(Poland) Andrzej Grzebyk	def.	(Poland) Wiktor Zalewski	KO (punch to the body)	1	3:23	
Middleweight 84 kg	(Poland) Piotr Kuberski	def.	(Poland) Damian Janikowski	TKO (punches)	2	0:47	
Welterweight 77 kg	(Poland) Igor Michaliszyn	def.	(Latvia) Madars Fleminas	Decision (unanimous)	3	5:00	
Lightweight 70 kg	(France) Aymard Guih	def.	(Poland) Dawid Śmiełowski	Decision (unanimous)	3	5:00	
Lightweight 70 kg	(Moldova) Nicolae Bivol	def.	(Poland) Adam Brysz	TKO (punches)	1	0:25	

== XTB KSW 101: Le Classique ==
XTB KSW 101: Le Classique
- Promotion: Konfrontacja Sztuk Walki
- Date: December 20, 2024
- Venue: Paris La Défense Arena
- City: Nanterre, France

XTB KSW 101: Le Classique was a mixed martial arts event held by Konfrontacja Sztuk Walki on December 20, 2024 at the Paris La Défense Arena in Nanterre, France.

=== Background ===
Bonus awards

The following fighters were awarded bonuses:

- Fight of the Night: Alioune Nahaye vs. Eduard Kexel
- Submission of the Night: Marcin Held
- Knockout of the Night: Laïd Zerhouni

=== Fight card ===
XTB KSW 101
Weight Class				Method	Round	Time	Notes
Lightweight 70 kg	(France) Salahdine Parnasse (c)	def.	(France) Wilson Varela	TKO (punches)	2	1:00	For the KSW Lightweight Championship.
Lightweight 70 kg	(Poland) Marcin Held	def.	(France) Davy Gallon	Submission (guillotine choke)	1	2:24	
Middleweight 84 kg	(France) Laïd Zerhouni	def.	(Belgium) Alain Van De Merckt	KO (punch)	1	1:41	
Welterweight 77 kg	(France) Mickael Lebout	def.	(France) Romain Debienne	Decision (unanimous)	3	5:00	
Catchweight 79 kg	(Poland) Artur Szczepaniak	def.	(France) Alex Lohoré	KO (head kick and punches)	1	0:54	
Lightweight 70 kg	(France) Ramzan Jembiev	def.	(France) El Hadji Ndiaye	TKO (elbows and punches)	1	2:58	
Featherweight 66 kg	(France) Alioune Nahaye	def.	(Germany) Eduard Kexel	Decision (unanimous)	3	5:00	
Catchweight 69 kg	(France) Nacim Belhouachi	def.	(France) Damien Peltier	TKO (punches)	1	3:45	
Catchweight 73 kg	(France) Amaury Wako-Zabo	vs.	(Poland) Maciej Rębacz	TKO (punches)	2	3:40	
Catchweight 63 kg	(France) Zakaria Hamou	def.	(Poland) Andrzej Karkula	KO (punches)	1	1:24	

== See also ==
- List of current KSW fighters
- 2024 in UFC
- 2024 in Bellator MMA
- 2024 in Professional Fighters League
- 2024 in ONE Championship
- 2024 in Absolute Championship Akhmat
- 2024 in Rizin Fighting Federation
- 2024 in LUX Fight League
- 2024 in Oktagon MMA
- 2024 in Brave Combat Federation
- 2024 in UAE Warriors
- 2024 in Legacy Fighting Alliance
- 2024 in Road FC
