= Kamil Szkaradek =

Polish mixed martial artist (born 1998)

- Born: Kamil Szkaradek; May 14, 1998 (age 28); Nowy Sącz, Poland
- Other names: Szkarad
- Height: 5 ft 6 in (1.68 m)
- Weight: 136 lb (62 kg; 9 st 10 lb)
- Division: Bantamweight (2021–present)
- Reach: 68.5 in (174 cm)
- Style: Brazilian jiu-jitsu
- Fighting out of: Kraków, Poland
- Team: Grappling Kraków
- Years active: 2021–present

Mixed martial arts record
- Total: 9
- Wins: 8
- By knockout: 1
- By submission: 3
- By decision: 4
- Losses: 1
- By knockout: 1
- By submission: 0

Other information
- Mixed martial arts record from Sherdog

Kamil Szkaradek (born May 14, 1998) is a Polish professional mixed martial artist. He currently competes in the Bantamweight division of Konfrontacja Sztuk Walki (KSW).

== Professional career ==
=== Early career ===
Szkaradek made his professional debut on November 5, 2021, against Mariusz Gołdyn. Szkaradek won the fight via a first-round TKO.

His next fight came on February 26, 2022, against Adrian Wieliczko. Szkaradek won the fight via a Unanimous Decision.

=== Konfrontacja Sztuk Walki ===
Szkaradek made his debut under Konfrontacja Sztuk Walki (KSW) on October 14, 2022, against David Martinik. Szkaradek won the fight via a Unanimous Decision.

His next fight came on March 17, 2023, against Patryk Chrobak. Szkaradek won the fight via a first-round submission.

His next fight came on August 19, 2023, against Patryk Surdyn. Szkaradek won the fight via a Unanimous Decision. This performance earned him his first career Fight of the Night bonus.

His next fight came on March 16, 2024, against Miljan Zdravković. Szkaradek lost the fight via a second-round knockout.

His next fight came over a year later on June 14, 2025, against Kenji Bortoluzzi. Szkaradek won the fight via a Unanimous Decision.

His next fight came on November 15, 2025, against Oleksii Polishchuk. Szkaradek won the fight via a second-round submission. This fight earned him his first career Submission of the Night bonus.

== Championships and accomplishments ==
=== Mixed martial arts ===
- Konfrontacja Sztuk Walki
  - Fight of the Night (One time)
  - Submission of the Night (One time)

== Mixed martial arts record ==
Professional record breakdown
9 matches	8 wins	1 loss
By knockout	1	1
By submission	3	0
By decision	4	0

Res.	Record	Opponent	Method	Event	Date	Round	Time	Location	Notes
Win	8–1	Rogério Bontorin	Submission (kneebar)	KSW 123	November 21, 2026	1	2:33	Szczecin, Poland	Catchweight (138 lb) bout; Szkaradek missed weight.
Win	7–1	Oleksii Polishchuk	Submission (rear-naked choke)	KSW 112	November 15, 2025	2	4:44	Szczecin, Poland	Submission of the Night.
Win	6–1	Kenji Bortoluzzi	Decision (unanimous)	KSW 107	June 14, 2025	3	5:00	Gdańsk, Poland	
Loss	5–1	Miljan Zdravković	KO (punches)	KSW 92	March 16, 2024	2	1:33	Gorzów Wielkopolski, Poland	
Win	5–0	Patryk Surdyn	Decision (unanimous)	KSW 85	August 19, 2023	3	5:00	Nowy Sącz, Poland	Fight of the Night.
Win	4–0	Patryk Chrobak	Submission (rear-naked choke)	KSW 80	March 17, 2023	1	2:24	Lubin, Poland	Catchweight (139 lb) bout.
Win	3–0	David Martinik	Decision (unanimous)	KSW 75	October 14, 2022	3	5:00	Nowy Sącz, Poland	
Win	2–0	Adrian Wieliczko	Decision (unanimous)	Armia Fight Night 12	February 26, 2022	3	5:00	Gliwice, Poland	
Win	1–0	Mariusz Gołdyn	TKO (punches)	Armia Fight Night 11	November 5, 2021	1	2:07	Łódź, Poland	Bantamweight debut.

== See also ==
- List of male mixed martial artists
