= Bartłomiej Gładkowicz =

Polish mixed martial artist (born 1996)

- Born: Bartłomiej Gładkowicz; 19 June 1996 (age 30); Bydgoszcz, Poland
- Other names: Clark Kent; BG
- Height: 6 ft 0 in (1.83 m)
- Weight: 205 lb (93 kg; 14 st 9 lb)
- Division: Welterweight (2018–2019); Middleweight (2017–2018, 2020–2022); Light Heavyweight (2022–present)
- Reach: 75.6 in (192 cm)
- Style: Brazilian Jiu-jitsu
- Fighting out of: Łódź, Poland
- Team: Octopus Łódź
- Rank: Brown belt in Brazilian Jiu-jitsu
- Years active: 2017–present

Mixed martial arts record
- Total: 18
- Wins: 13
- By knockout: 4
- By submission: 4
- By decision: 5
- By disqualification: 0
- Losses: 5
- By knockout: 2
- By submission: 0
- By decision: 3

Other information
- Mixed martial arts record from Sherdog

Bartłomiej Gładkowicz (born 19 June 1996) is a Polish professional mixed martial artist. He currently competes in the Light Heavyweight division of Fight Nation Championship (FNC). He has previously competed under Konfrontacja Sztuk Walki (KSW) and Babilon MMA.

== Professional career ==
=== Early career ===
Gładkowicz made his professional debut on April 22, 2017, against Krzysztof Jankowiak. Gładkowicz won the fight via a first-round TKO.

=== Slugfest ===
Gładkowicz made his debut under Slugfest on October 28, 2017, against Michał Dąbrowski. Gładkowicz won the fight via a first-round TKO.

His next fight came on April 13, 2018, against Krzysztof Florczak. Gładkowicz won the fight via a first-round submission.

=== Envio Fight Night ===
Gładkowicz returned to Envio Fight Night, after his professional debut under the federation, on September 22, 2018, against Daniel Lewandowski. Gładkowicz won the fight via a Unanimous Decision.

His next fight came on June 8, 2019, against Damian Domachowski. Gładkowicz won the fight via a first-round submission.

=== SWG Welterweight Champion ===
Gładkowicz faced Sebastian Jaroński for the vacant SWG Welterweight Championship on December 14, 2019. Gładkowicz won the fight via a Unanimous Decision, winning his first career championship.

=== Babilon MMA ===
Gładkowicz made his debut under Babilon MMA on August 28, 2020, against Robert Maciejowski. Gładkowicz lost the fight via a first-round TKO, suffering his first career defeat.

His next fight came on April 30, 2021, against Piotr Drozdowski. Gładkowicz won the fight via a first-round submission.

His next fight came on November 12, 2021, against Filip Tomczak. Gładkowicz won the fight via a first-round knockout.

=== Real Fight Arena ===
Gładkowicz made his debut under Slovak federation Real Fight Arena (RFA) on March 12, 2022, against David Hošek. Gładkowicz lost the fight via a Split Decision.

=== Konfrontacja Sztuk Walki and Envio Fight Night ===
Gładkowicz made his debut under Konfrontacja Sztuk Walki (KSW) on July 23, 2022, against future Ultimate Fighting Championship (UFC) fighter, Oumar Sy. Gładkowicz lost the fight via a Unanimous Decision.

Gładkowicz returned to Envio Fight Night on September 24, 2022, against Kornel Zapadka. Gładkowicz won the fight via a first-round TKO.

Gładkowicz returned to Konfrontacja Sztuk Walki (KSW) on March 17, 2023, against Damian Piwowarczyk. Gładkowicz lost the fight via a first-round TKO.

=== Return to Babilon MMA ===
Gładkowicz returned to Babilon MMA on September 22, 2023, against Piotr Walawski. Gładkowicz won the fight via a Unanimous Decision.

His next fight came on January 27, 2024, against Sergiusz Zając. Gładkowicz lost the fight via a Unanimous Decision.

=== Return to Real Fight Arena ===
Gładkowicz returned to Real Fight Arena (RFA) on March 14, 2025, against Lajos Papp. Gładkowicz won the fight via a Unanimous Decision.

=== King's Arena ===
Gładkowicz made his debut under King's Arena during their inaugural event on September 13, 2025, against Adam Kowalski. Gładkowicz won the fight via a Unanimous Decision.

=== Fight Nation Championship ===
On December 5, 2025, it was announced that Gładkowicz had signed with Croatian federation Fight Nation Championship (FNC).

His debut under the federation came on April 11, 2026, against Andres Ramos. Gładkowicz won the fight via a second-round Submission.

== Championships and accomplishments ==
=== Mixed martial arts ===
- Sporty Walki Gostyń
  - SWG Welterweight Championship (One time; former)

== Mixed martial arts record ==
Professional record breakdown
18 matches	13 wins	5 losses
By knockout	4	2
By submission	4	0
By decision	5	3

Res.	Record	Opponent	Method	Event	Date	Round	Time	Location	Notes
Win	13–5	Andres Ramos	Submission (rear-naked choke)	FNC 29	April 11, 2026	2	0:49	Ljubljana, Slovenia	
Win	12–5	Adam Kowalski	Decision (unanimous)	King's Arena 1	September 13, 2025	3	5:00	Poznań, Poland	
Win	11–5	Lajos Papp	Decision (unanimous)	RFA 20	March 14, 2025	3	5:00	Bratislava, Slovakia	
Loss	10–5	Sergiusz Zając	Decision (unanimous)	Babilon MMA 42	January 27, 2024	3	5:00	Żyrardów, Poland	
Win	10–4	Piotr Walawski	Decision (unanimous)	Babilon MMA 38	September 22, 2023	3	5:00	Chełm, Poland	
Loss	9–4	Damian Piwowarczyk	TKO (elbows and punches)	KSW 80	March 17, 2023	1	2:39	Lubin, Poland	
Win	9–3	Kornel Zapadka	TKO (punches)	Envio Fight Night '22	September 24, 2022	1	0:47	Bydgoszcz, Poland	Catchweight (209 lb) bout.
Loss	8–3	Oumar Sy	Decision (unanimous)	KSW 72	July 23, 2022	3	5:00	Kielce, Poland	Light Heavyweight debut.
Loss	8–2	David Hošek	Decision (split)	RFA: Warm Up	March 12, 2022	3	5:00	Bratislava, Slovakia	
Win	8–1	Filip Tomczak	KO (punch)	Babilon MMA 26	November 12, 2021	1	2:23	Ożarów Mazowiecki, Poland	
Win	7–1	Piotr Drozdowski	Submission (heel hook)	Babilon MMA 21	April 30, 2021	1	2:31	Warsaw, Poland	
Loss	6–1	Robert Maciejowski	TKO (punches)	Babilon MMA 15	August 28, 2020	1	4:34	Biała Rawska, Poland	Return to Middleweight.
Win	6–0	Sebastian Jaroński	Decision (unanimous)	Gala Sportów Walki 17	December 14, 2019	3	5:00	Gostyń, Poland	Won the vacant SWG Welterweight Championship.
Win	5–0	Damian Domachowski	Submission (rear-naked choke)	Envio Fight Night '20	June 8, 2019	1	2:37	Bydgoszcz, Poland	
Win	4–0	Daniel Lewandowski	Decision (unanimous)	Envio Fight Night '19	September 22, 2018	3	5:00	Toruń, Poland	Welterweight debut.
Win	3–0	Krzysztof Florczak	Submission (rear-naked choke)	Slugfest 14	April 13, 2018	1	1:26	Murowana Goślina, Poland	
Win	2–0	Michał Dąbrowski	TKO (punches)	Slugfest 12	October 28, 2017	1	2:49	Wągrowiec, Poland	
Win	1–0	Krzysztof Jankowiak	TKO (punches)	Envio Fight Night '17	April 22, 2017	1	N/A	Bydgoszcz, Poland	Middleweight debut.

== See also ==
- List of male mixed martial artists
