= Mariusz Książkiewicz =

Polish-Canadian mixed martial artist (born 1989)

- Born: October 4, 1989 (age 37); Ludwigsburg, West Germany
- Other names: The Iron Pol
- Nationality: Canadian, Polish
- Height: 6 ft 3 in (1.91 m)
- Weight: 203 lb (92 kg; 14 st 7 lb)
- Division: Welterweight (2011–2016); Middleweight (2018–2022); Super Middleweight (2021); Light Heavyweight (2016, 2024–present)
- Reach: 75 in (191 cm)
- Style: Brazilian jiu-jitsu, Boxing
- Stance: Southpaw
- Fighting out of: Winnipeg, Manitoba, Canada
- Team: Winnipeg Academy of Mixed Martial Arts
- Rank: Black belt in Brazilian jiu-jitsu
- Years active: 2011–present

Mixed martial arts record
- Total: 14
- Wins: 11
- By knockout: 5
- By submission: 5
- By decision: 1
- Losses: 3
- By knockout: 1
- By submission: 1
- By decision: 1

Other information
- Mixed martial arts record from Sherdog

Mariusz Książkiewicz (born October 4, 1989) is a German-born Polish-Canadian professional mixed martial artist. He currently competes in the Light Heavyweight division for Konfrontacja Sztuk Walki. He is a former Unified MMA and Ignite Fights Light Heavyweight champion. He previously competed on Aggression Fighting Championship, Legacy Fighting Alliance, and Dana White's Contender Series.

== Early life ==
Książkiewicz was born on October 4, 1989 in Ludwigsburg, West Germany to Polish parents. He moved to Winnipeg at the age of 2.

== Professional career ==
=== Early career ===
Książkiewicz made his professional debut on May 13, 2011 against Henry Rowsell. Książkiewicz won the fight via a first round submission.

=== Aggression Fighting Championship ===
Książkiewicz made his debut with Aggression Fighting Championship on September 15, 2012 against Dejan Kajić. Książkiewicz won the fight via Unanimous Decision.

His next fight came on March 23, 2013 against Ash Mashreghi. Książkiewicz won the fight via a first round submsision.

=== Return to regionals ===
His next fight came eight months later on November 15 against Steve Dubeck. Książkiewicz won the fight via a second round submssion.

After a three year hiatus, Książkiewicz returned to the cage on March 12, 2016 against Micah Brakefield. Książkiewicz won the fight via a second round TKO.

On October 19, 2016, Książkiewicz made his debut with Alaska Fighting Championship against Douglas McFresh. Książkiewicz won the fight via a first round TKO.

After a two year hiatus, Książkiewicz returned on August 2, 2018 against Jo Vallée under the promotion TKO Major League. Książkiewicz won the fight via a third round submission.

After a year off, Książkiewicz returned on November 9, 2019 against Guilherme Miranda under the promotion Teofista. Książkiewicz won the fight via a first round submission.

=== Dana White's Contender Series ===
On November 10, 2020, Książkiewicz faced Mário Sousa in the fourth season of Dana White's Contender Series. Książkiewicz lost the fight via Unanimous Decision.

=== Unified MMA Super Middleweight champion ===
On December 17, 2021, Książkiewicz faced Graham Park for Park's Unified MMA Super Middleweight championship. Książkiewicz won the fight via a first round TKO, and thus claimed his first career championship.

=== Legacy Fighting Alliance ===
Książkiewicz made his debut with Legacy Fighting Alliance on April 22, 2022 in the main event of LFA 130 against Alessandro Gambulino. Książkiewicz won the fight via a first round TKO.

=== Return to Unified MMA ===
Książkiewicz returned to Unified MMA on May 27, 2022 against Eli Aronov. Książkiewicz lost the fight via a second round submission.

=== Ignite Fights Light Heavyweight champion ===
After a two year hiatus, Książkiewicz returned against Rafael Carvalho on April 13, 2024 for the vacant Ignite Fights Light Heavyweight championship. Książkiewicz won the fight via a fourth round TKO, and thus claimed his second career championship.

=== Konfrontacja Sztuk Walki ===
On July 3, 2025, Książkiewicz signed with Polish promotion, Konfrontacja Sztuk Walki (KSW). He made his debut two months later on September 20 against Sergiusz Zając. Książkiewicz lost due to a knee injury in the first round.

== Personal life ==
Książkiewicz has two daughters, Paulina and Elżbieta. On April 2, 2025, news surfaced that Książkiewicz was attacked and stabbed in the heart while going to throw out the garbage by an unknown assailant. Książkiewicz put pressure on the wound, and drove himself to the hospital.

== Championships and accomplishments ==
=== Mixed martial arts ===
- Unified MMA
  - Unified MMA Super Middleweight champion (One time; former)
- Ignite Fights
  - Ignite Fights Light Heavyweight champion (One time; former)

== Mixed martial arts record ==
Professional record breakdown
14 matches	11 wins	3 losses
By knockout	5	1
By submission	5	1
By decision	1	1

Res.	Record	Opponent	Method	Event	Date	Round	Time	Location	Notes
Loss	11–3	Sergiusz Zając	TKO (knee injury)	KSW 110	September 20, 2025	1	1:07	Rzeszów, Poland	
Win	11–2	Rafael Carvalho	KO (punches)	Ignite Fights: Iowa Fight Series 2	April 13, 2024	4	0:47	Marshalltown, Iowa, United States	Return to Light Heavyweight. Won the vacant IF Light Heavyweight championship.
Loss	10–2	Eli Aronov	Submission (arm-triangle choke)	Unified MMA 45	May 27, 2022	2	4:32	Enoch, Alberta, Canada	
Win	10–1	Alessandro Gambulino	TKO (knee to the body and punches)	LFA 130	April 22, 2022	1	1:29	New Town, North Dakota, United States	Return to Middleweight.
Win	9–1	Graham Park	TKO (punches)	Unified MMA 42	December 17, 2021	1	1:25	Enoch, Alberta, Canada	Super Middleweight debut. Won the Unified MMA Super Middleweight championship.
Loss	8–1	Mário Sousa	Decision (unanimous)	Dana White's Contender Series 35	November 10, 2020	3	5:00	Las Vegas, Nevada, United States	
Win	8–0	Guilherme Miranda	Submission (rear-naked choke)	Teofista: Fight For The Troops	November 9, 2019	1	4:07	Brandon, Manitoba, Canada	
Win	7–0	Jo Vallée	Submission (rear-naked choke)	TKO Fight Night 1	August 2, 2018	3	1:13	Montreal, Quebec, Canada	Return to Middleweight.
Win	6–0	Douglas McFresh	TKO (elbows)	Alaska FC 126	October 19, 2016	1	1:20	Anchorage, Alaska, United States	Light Heavyweight debut.
Win	5–0	Micah Brakefield	TKO (doctor stoppage)	Prestige FC 2	March 12, 2016	2	5:00	Regina, Saskatchewan, Canada	Middleweight debut.
Win	4–0	Steve Dubeck	Submission (rear-naked choke)	KOTC: Out Cold	November 15, 2013	2	3:53	Cold Lake, Alberta, Canada	Catchweight (175 lb) bout.
Win	3–0	Ash Mashreghi	Submission (rear-naked choke)	Aggression FC 16	March 23, 2013	1	1:55	Winnipeg, Manitoba, Canada	
Win	2–0	Dejan Kajić	Decision (unanimous)	Aggression FC 11	September 15, 2012	3	5:00	Winnipeg, Manitoba, Canada	Catchweight (171 lb) bout.
Win	1–0	Henry Rowsell	Submission (rear-naked choke)	Cage Fighting Manitoba 2	May 13, 2011	1	0:27	Winnipeg, Manitoba, Canada	Welterweight debut.
