= Hugo Deux =

Hungarian mixed martial artist (born 1996)

- Born: Hugo Deux; 2 April 1996 (age 30); Lyon, France
- Other names: Némésis
- Height: 5 ft 9 in (1.75 m)
- Weight: 156 lb (71 kg; 11 st 2 lb)
- Division: Lightweight (2022–present); Welterweight (2024)
- Reach: 69.3 in (176 cm)
- Style: Judo
- Fighting out of: Warsaw, Poland
- Team: Nemesis Pro Team
- Years active: 2022–present

Mixed martial arts record
- Total: 8
- Wins: 7
- By knockout: 3
- By submission: 0
- By decision: 4
- By disqualification: 0
- Losses: 1
- By knockout: 1
- By submission: 0
- By decision: 0

Other information
- Mixed martial arts record from Sherdog

Hugo Deux (born 2 April 1996) is a French professional mixed martial artist. He currently competes in the Lightweight division of Konfrontacja Sztuk Walki (KSW).

== Professional career ==
=== Early career ===
Deux made his professional debut on June 25, 2022, against fellow debutant Diego Emanuel Dias. Deux won the fight via a first-round TKO, after his opponent retired on the stool.

His next fight came on February 18, 2023, agaisnt Jan Stanovský. Duex won the fight via a Unanimous Decision.

=== Konfrontacja Sztuk Walki ===
Deux made his debut under Konfrontacja Sztuk Walki (KSW) on January 20, 2024, against Gino van Steenis. Deux won the fight via a Unanimous Decision.

His next fight came on July 20, 2024, against Adam Brysz. Deux lost the fight via a second-round knockout.

=== Return to Strife MMA ===
Following his loss, Deux returned to Strife MMA, the federation he competed under in his first two professional fights. His return came on February 8, 2025, against Francesco Moricca. Deux won the fight via a second-round TKO, after his opponent submitted following multiple strikes.

=== Return to Konfrontacja Sztuk Walki ===
Deux made his return to Konfrontacja Sztuk Walki (KSW) on May 10, 2025, against Krystian Blezień, competing in his hometown of Lyon. Deux won the fight via a Unanimous Decision.

His next fight came on November 15, 2025, against Wojciech Kawa. Deux won the fight via a Unanimous Decision.

His next fight came on April 18, 2026, against Welisson Paiva. Deux won the fight via a second-round TKO. His post fight interview made headlines, after he first dedicated his win to his deceased friend, and then proclaimed that Europeans should defend their native land stating: "Poland belongs to the Poles, France belongs to the French". This statement was made due to the mass illegal migration into Europe.

== Mixed martial arts record ==
Professional record breakdown
8 matches	7 wins	1 loss
By knockout	3	1
By submission	0	0
By decision	4	0

Res.	Record	Opponent	Method	Event	Date	Round	Time	Location	Notes
Win	7–1	Welisson Paiva	TKO (elbows)	KSW 117	April 18, 2026	2	4:59	Warsaw, Poland	
Win	6–1	Wojciech Kawa	Decision (unanimous)	KSW 112	November 15, 2025	3	5:00	Szczecin, Poland	
Win	5–1	Krystian Blezień	Decision (unanimous)	KSW 106	May 10, 2025	3	5:00	Lyon, France	
Win	4–1	Francesco Moricca	TKO (submission to punches)	Strife 12	February 8, 2025	2	4:04	Kielce, Poland	Return to Lightweight.
Loss	3–1	Adam Brysz	KO (spinning back elbow)	KSW 96	July 20, 2024	2	4:11	Łódź, Poland	Welterweight debut.
Win	3–0	Gino van Steenis	Decision (unanimous)	KSW 90	January 20, 2024	3	5:00	Warsaw, Poland	
Win	2–0	Jan Stanovský	Decision (unanimous)	Strife 3	February 18, 2023	3	5:00	Puławy, Poland	
Win	1–0	Diego Emanuel Dias	TKO (retirement)	Strife 2	June 25, 2022	1	5:00	Puławy, Poland	Lightweight debut.

== See also ==
- List of male mixed martial artists
- List of current Konfrontacja Sztuk Walki fighters
