= Laura Grzyb =

Polish fighter (born 1995)

- Born: Laura Monika Grzyb; April 29, 1995 (age 31); Wodzisław Śląski, Poland
- Height: 5 ft 5 in (1.65 m)
- Weight: 185 lb (84 kg; 13 st 3 lb)
- Division: Flyweight (2025–present) (MMA); Super Bantamweight (Boxing)
- Reach: 66.1 in (168 cm)
- Fighting out of: Jastrzębie-Zdrój, Poland
- Team: Shark Top Team Bytom; Nemesis Pro Team
- Years active: 2019–present (Boxing); 2025–present (MMA); 2024 (Kickboxing)

Professional boxing record
- Total: 12
- Wins: 12
- By knockout: 3
- Losses: 0

Kickboxing record
- Total: 1
- Wins: 1
- By knockout: 0
- Losses: 0
- By knockout: 0
- Draws: 0

Mixed martial arts record
- Total: 3
- Wins: 2
- By knockout: 1
- By submission: 0
- By decision: 1
- Losses: 1
- By submission: 1

Other information
- Boxing record from BoxRec
- Mixed martial arts record from Sherdog

Laura Monika Grzyb (born April 29, 1995) is a Polish professional boxer, professional mixed martial artist, and former kickboxer. She is the current IBO female super bantamweight champion. She currently competes in the Flyweight division of Konfrontacja Sztuk Walki (KSW). She is a former European female super bantamweight champion.

== Boxing career ==
=== Early career ===
Grzyb made her professional debut on March 23, 2019, against Branka Arambašić. Grzyb won the fight via a first-round knockout.

Her next fight came on October 19, 2019, against Valeria Aletta Kovacs. Grzyb won the fight via a first-round TKO.

Her next fight came on July 10, 2020, against Bojana Libiszewska. Grzyb won the fight via a third-round TKO.

Her next fight came on September 26, 2020, against Monica Gentili. Grzyb won the fight via a Unanimous Decision.

Her next fight came on December 18, 2020, against Enerolisa de Leon. Grzyb won the fight via a Unanimous Decision.

Following a year and a half long hiatus, she returned to the ring on March 26, 2022, against Vanesa Caballero. Grzyb won the fight via a Unanimous Decision.

Her next fight came on June 24, 2022, against Martine Vallieres-Bisson. Grzyb won the fight via a Unanimous Decision.

Her next fight came on October 29, 2022, against Marian Herrería. Grzyb won the fight via a Unanimous Decision.

=== European super bantamweight champion ===
Grzyb faced Maria Cecchi on April 22, 2023, for the vacant European female super bantamweight championship. Grzyb won the fight via a Split Decision, winning her first career championship in the process.

Her first title defense came on October 7, 2023, against Stevi Levy. Grzyb won the fight via a Unanimous Decision, successfully defending her championship in the process.

=== IBO international super bantamweight champion ===
Grzyb faced Sarai Umpierrez on October 26, 2024, for the vacant IBO international super bantamweight championship. Grzyb won the fight via a Unanimous Decision, winning her second career championship in the process.

=== IBO super bantamweight champion ===
Following a year and a half long hiatus, Grzyb returned to the ring on March 15, 2026, where she faced Simamkele Tuntsheni for the vacant IBO female super bantamweight championship. Grzyb won the fight via a Unanimous Decision, winning her third career championship, and first world championship in the process.

== Mixed martial arts career ==
=== Early career ===
On February 12, 2025, it was announced that Grzyb had signed with polish federation Konfrontacja Sztuk Walki (KSW).

Her professional debut came on April 26, 2025, against Gabriela Hristea. Grzyb won the fight via a Unanimous Decision.

Her next fight came on October 18, 2025, against Karolína Vaňková. Grzyb won the fight via a first-round knockout. This performance earned her her first Knockout of the Night bonus.

Her next fight came on July 18, 2026, against Rayla Nascimento. Grzyb lost the fight via a second-round submission, suffering her first professional loss across every formula.

== Kickboxing career ==
Grzyb made her professional kickboxing debut on June 15, 2024, against Oliwia Stawska under the federation Fight Exclusive Night (FEN MMA). Grzyb won the fight via a Unanimous Decision.

== Championships and accomplishments ==
=== Boxing ===
- International Boxing Organization
  - IBO female super bantamweight championship (One time; current)
  - IBO international super bantamweight championship (One time; former)
- European Boxing Union
  - European female super bantamweight championship (One time; former)
    - One successful title defense

=== Mixed martial arts ===
- Konfrontacja Sztuk Walki
  - Knockout of the Night (One time)

== Mixed martial arts record ==
Professional record breakdown
3 matches	2 wins	1 loss
By knockout	1	0
By submission	0	1
By decision	1	0

Res.	Record	Opponent	Method	Event	Date	Round	Time	Location	Notes
Loss	2–1	Rayla Nascimento	Submission (rear-naked choke)	KSW 120	July 18, 2026	2	4:42	Gdynia, Poland	
Win	2–0	Karolína Vaňková	KO (punch to the body)	KSW 111	October 18, 2025	1	0:56	Třinec, Czech Republic	Knockout of the Night.
Win	1–0	Gabriela Hristea	Decision (unanimous)	KSW 105	April 26, 2025	3	5:00	Gliwice, Poland	Flyweight debut.

== Professional boxing record ==
12 fights	12 wins	0 losses
By knockout	3	0
By decision	9	0

No.	Result	Record	Opponent	Type	Round, time	Date	Location	Notes
12	Win	12–0	Simamkele Tuntsheni	UD	10	15 Mar 2026	Hala Widowiskowo-Sportowa, Jastrzębie-Zdrój, Poland	Won vacant IBO female super bantamweight title
11	Win	11–0	Sarai Umpiérrez	UD	8	26 Oct 2024	Nosalowy Dwór, Zakopane, Poland	Won vacant IBO international female super bantamweight title
10	Win	10–0	Stevi Levy	UD	10	7 Oct 2023	Hala Widowiskowo-Sportowa, Jastrzębie-Zdrój, Poland	Retained European female super bantamweight title
9	Win	9–0	Maria Cecchi	SD	10	22 Apr 2023	G2A Arena, Rzeszów, Poland	Won vacant European female super bantamweight title
8	Win	8–0	Marian Herrería	UD	8	29 Oct 2022	Nosalowy Dwór, Zakopane, Poland	
7	Win	7–0	Martine Vallieres-Bisson	UD	8	24 Jun 2022	Hala Legionów, Kielce, Poland	
6	Win	6–0	Vanesa Caballero	UD	6	26 Mar 2022	Opera i Filharmonia Podlaska, Białystok, Poland	
5	Win	5–0	Enerolisa de Leon	UD	10	18 Dec 2020	Hala Sportowa, ul. Sosnowa 3, Pionki, Poland	
4	Win	4–0	Monica Gentili	UD	8	26 Sep 2020	Hala Sportowa, Częstochowa, Poland	
3	Win	3–0	Bojana Libiszewska	TKO	3 (6), 1:32	10 Jul 2020	Hala Sportowa, ul. Sosnowa 3, Pionki, Poland	
2	Win	2–0	Valeria Aletta Kovacs	TKO	1 (4), 1:19	19 Oct 2019	Hala ICDS, Łomianki, Poland	
1	Win	1–0	Branka Arambašić	KO	1 (4), 0:22	23 Mar 2019	Hala Sportowa im. Olimpijczykow, Łomża, Poland	

== Kickboxing record ==
Professional kickboxing record
1 wins (0 (T)KOs), 0 losses, 0 draws
Date	Result	Opponent	Event	Location	Method	Round	Time
2024-06-15	Win	(Poland) Oliwia Stawska	FEN MMA 55	Ostróda, Poland	Decision (unaniomus)	3	3:00

== See also ==
- List of female mixed martial artists
- List of current Konfrontacja Sztuk Walki fighters
- List of female boxers
