= Igor Michaliszyn =

Polish mixed martial artist (born 1996)

- Born: May 3, 1996 (age 30); Dąbrowa Górnicza, Poland
- Height: 6 ft 0 in (1.83 m)
- Weight: 170 lb (77 kg; 12 st 2 lb)
- Division: Lightweight (2015–2016); Welterweight (2017–present); Middleweight (2024)
- Reach: 75 in (191 cm)
- Style: Kickboxing and Brazilian jiu jitsu
- Stance: Orthodox
- Fighting out of: Dąbrowa Górnicza, Poland
- Team: Silesian Cage Club
- Years active: 2015–present

Mixed martial arts record
- Total: 16
- Wins: 12
- By knockout: 4
- By submission: 3
- By decision: 5
- Losses: 4
- By knockout: 2
- By submission: 1
- By decision: 1

Other information
- Mixed martial arts record from Sherdog

Igor Michaliszyn (born May 3, 1996) is a Polish professional mixed martial artist. He currently competes in the Welterweight division for Konfrontacja Sztuk Walki.

== Professional career ==
Michaliszyn would make his debut on September 11, 2015 against Sebastian Świder whom he would beat via TKO in the second round.

He would go on to have four more fights before making his debut on Fight Exclusive Night in a bout against Tomasz Romanowski. he would get the win via Unanimous Decision.

After another four fights in regional promotions, Michaliszyn would be signed to Konfrontacja Sztuk Walki, where he fought his debut match against Idris Amizhaev on the undercard of KSW 67. Michaliszyn would win the fight via TKO in the first round.

His next fight would come over a year later, where he faced off against Krystian Bielski. He would yet again win the fight via TKO this time begin in the second round.

His next fight would be his biggest one yet as he faced off against Adrian Bartosiński for the KSW Welterweight championship. Michaliszyn took this fight on short notice after Bartosiński's original opponent withdrew from the matchup. Michaliszyn would unfortunately lose the fight via Submission in the third round.

After this loss, he would return three months later to face off against Oton Jasse. Michaliszyn would reenter the win column after defeating the latter via Unanimous Decision.

His next fight would come three months later, where he faced off against Madras Fleminas on the under card of the 100th KSW event. He would win the fight via yet another Unanimous Decision.

He returned five months later in a bout against Artur Szczepaniak. Michaliszyn would unfortunately lose the bout via TKO in the first round.

== Mixed martial arts record ==
Professional record breakdown
16 matches	12 wins	4 losses
By knockout	4	2
By submission	3	1
By decision	5	1

Res.	Record	Opponent	Method	Event	Date	Round	Time	Location	Notes
Loss	12–4	Artur Szczepaniak	TKO (head kick and punches)	KSW 105	April 26, 2025	1	2:40	Gliwice, Poland	
Win	12–3	Madras Fleminas	Decision (unanimous)	KSW 100	November 16, 2024	3	5:00	Gliwice, Poland	Return to Welterweight.
Win	11–3	Oton Jasse	Decision (unanimous)	KSW 97	August 24, 2024	3	5:00	Tarnów, Poland	Middleweight debut.
Loss	10–3	Adrian Bartosiński	Submission (kneebar)	KSW 94	May 11, 2024	3	4:50	Gdańsk, Poland	For the KSW Welterweight championship.
Win	10–2	Krysian Bielski	TKO (elbows)	KSW 81	April 22, 2023	2	3:29	Tomaszów Mazowiecki, Poland	
Win	9–2	Idris Amizhaev	TKO (elbows)	KSW 67	February 26, 2022	1	1:06	Warsaw, Poland	Catchweight (176 lb) bout.
Win	8–2	Georgi Valentinov	Submission (guillotine choke)	EFM Show 1	April 9, 2021	1	4:23	Łódź, Poland	
Win	7–2	Piotr Danleski	Decision (unanimous)	Rocky Warriors Cartel 5	July 31, 2020	3	5:00	Mrągowo, Poland	
Win	6–2	Davit Khutsishvili	TKO (punches)	Rocky Warriors Cartel 4	February 22, 2020	1	2:12	Dąbrowa Górnicza, Poland	
Loss	5–2	Lom-Ali Nalgiev	TKO (punch)	Rocky Warriors Cartel 3	July 5, 2019	1	2:03	Gdynia, Poland	
Win	5–1	Tomasz Romanowski	Decision (unanimous)	Fight Exclusive Night 18	August 12, 2017	3	5:00	Koszalin, Poland	
Loss	4–1	Daniel Skibiński	Decision (unanimous)	Victory FC League 4	April 28, 2017	3	5:00	Racibórz, Poland	Welterweight debut.
Win	4–0	Piotr Wróblewski	Submission (triangle choke)	Spartan Fight 6	December 17, 2016	2	2:36	Płock, Poland	
Win	3–0	Radosław Tarnawa	Decision (unanimous)	Spartan Fight 4	August 6, 2016	3	5:00	Bielsko-Biała, Poland	
Win	2–0	Mykhaito Hyelia	Submission (rear-naked choke)	Spartan Fight 2	March 2, 2016	1	4:32	Chorzów, Poland	
Win	1–0	Sebastian Świder	TKO (punches)	Gladiators of the Cage 2	September 11, 2015	2	2:42	Kraków, Poland	Lightweight debut.
