= Sergiusz Zając =

Polish mixed martial artist (born 1998)

- Born: Sergiusz Zając; October 9, 1998 (age 28); Żołynia, Poland
- Height: 6 ft 4 in (1.93 m)
- Weight: 205 lb (93 kg; 14 st 9 lb)
- Division: Light Heavyweight (2020–present)
- Reach: 74.4 in (189 cm)
- Fighting out of: Żołynia, Poland
- Team: Spartakus Rzeszów
- Years active: 2020–present

Mixed martial arts record
- Total: 12
- Wins: 10
- By knockout: 9
- By submission: 0
- By decision: 1
- Losses: 2
- By knockout: 1
- By submission: 1

Other information
- Mixed martial arts record from Sherdog

Sergiusz Zając (born October 9, 1998) is a Polish professional mixed martial artist. He currently competes in the Light Heavyweight division of Konfrontacja Sztuk Walki (KSW).

== Professional career ==
=== Early career ===
Zając made his professional debut on November 27, 2020 against Łukasz Olech. Zając lost the fight via a first-round submission.

After a year and a half away from the sport, he returned on February 19, 2022 against Paweł Całkowski. Zając won the fight via a third-round TKO.

=== Babilon MMA ===
Zając made his debut under Babilon MMA on July 8, 2022 against Łukasz Kulpa. Zając won the fight via a first-round TKO.

=== Carpathian Warriors ===
Zając made his debut under Carpathian Warriors on October 1, 2022 against Wincenty Krawczyk. Zając won the fight via a first-round TKO.

=== Return to Babilon MMA ===
Zając returned to Babilon MMA on September 22, 2023 against Dominik Owsiany. Zając won the fight via a first-round TKO.

His next fight came on January 27, 2024 against Bartłomiej Gładkowicz. Zając won the fight via a Unanimous Decision.

His last fight under the federation came on June 1, 2024 against Ramon Drum. Zając won the fight via a first-round TKO.

=== Konfrontacja Sztuk Walki ===
On August 15, 2024, it was announced that Zając had signed with Konfrontacja Sztuk Walki (KSW), and will be facing Kleber Raimundo Silva in his debut on August 24, 2024. The bout proceeded after Zając missed weight by 5.2 pounds. Despite missing weight, Zając won the fight via a first-round TKO.

His next fight came on March 8, 2025 against Michał Dreczkowski. Zając won the fight via a first-round TKO. This fight earned him his first Knockout of the Night bonus.

His next fight came on September 20, 2025 against debutant Mariusz Książkiewicz. Zając won the fight in the first round after Książkiewicz suffered a knee injury.

His next fight came on March 14, 2026, against Damian Piwowarczyk. Zając lost the fight via a second-round TKO. Despite the loss, this performance earned him his first Fight of the Night bonus.

== Championships and accomplishments ==
=== Mixed martial arts ===
- Konfrontacja Sztuk Walki
  - Knockout of the Night (One time)
  - Fight of the Night (One time)

== Mixed martial arts record ==
Professional record breakdown
12 matches	10 wins	2 losses
By knockout	9	1
By submission	0	1
By decision	1	0

Res.	Record	Opponent	Method	Event	Date	Round	Time	Location	Notes
Win	10–2	Salim El Ouassaidi	KO (elbows and punches)	KSW 122	October 10, 2026	1	1:09	Rzeszów, Poland	Catchweight (215 lb) bout; Zając missed weight.
Loss	9–2	Damian Piwowarczyk	TKO (punches)	KSW 116	March 14, 2026	2	1:22	Gorzów Wielkopolski, Poland	Fight of the Night.
Win	9–1	Mariusz Książkiewicz	KO (punches)	KSW 110	September 20, 2025	1	1:07	Rzeszów, Poland	
Win	8–1	Michał Dreczkowski	KO (knee)	KSW 104	March 8, 2025	1	4:00	Gorzów Wielkopolski, Poland	Knockout of the Night.
Win	7–1	Kleber Raimundo Silva	TKO (submission to elbows)	KSW 97	August 24, 2024	1	1:36	Tarnów, Poland	Catchweight (210.3 lb) bout; Zając missed weight.
Win	6–1	Ramon Drum	TKO (elbows)	Babilon MMA 45	June 1, 2024	1	2:30	Nowy Targ, Poland	Catchweight (209 lb) bout.
Win	5–1	Bartłomiej Gładkowicz	Decision (unanimous)	Babilon MMA 42	January 27, 2024	3	5:00	Żyrardów, Poland	
Win	4–1	Dominik Owsiany	TKO (elbows)	Babilon MMA 38	September 22, 2023	1	4:31	Chełm, Poland	
Win	3–1	Wincenty Krawczyk	TKO (knees and punches)	Carpathian Warriors 10	October 1, 2022	1	2:50	Rzeszów, Poland	
Win	2–1	Łukasz Kulpa	TKO (punches)	Babilon MMA 30	July 8, 2022	1	2:45	Międzyzdroje, Poland	
Win	1–1	Paweł Całkowski	TKO (punches)	Prime Show MMA 1	February 19, 2022	3	4:37	Łódź, Poland	Light heavyweight debut.
Loss	0–1	Łukasz Olech	Submission (rear-naked choke)	Opolscy Wojownicy 5	November 27, 2020	1	N/A	Opole, Poland	Catchweight (194 lb) bout.

== See also ==
- List of current KSW fighters
- List of male mixed martial artists
