= Hala Urania =

Indoor arena in Poland

Coordinates: 51.4624°N 20.2942°E

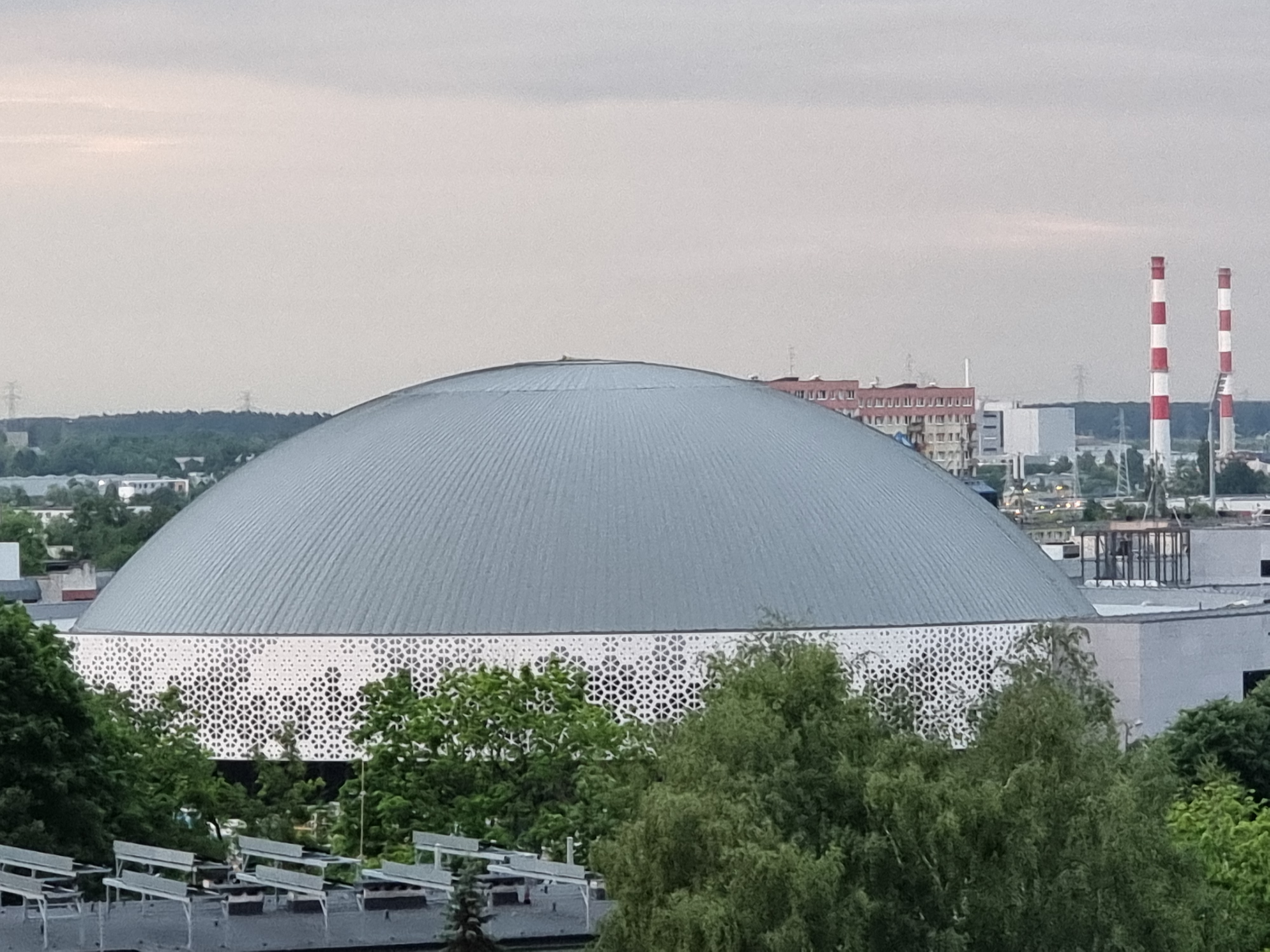
- Interactive map of Hala Urania
- Full name: Hala Widowiskowo-Sportowa Urania
- Location: al. marszałka Józefa Piłsudskiego 44; Olsztyn, Poland
- Capacity: Maximum: 4,046

Construction
- Built: July 1978
- Renovated: 2021-2023
- Reopened: December 15, 2023

Tenant
- Indykpol AZS Olsztyn

Hala Urania is an indoor arena in Olsztyn, Poland.

The Urania hall was commissioned in July 1978. The hall has a large sports hall with a full-size playground for handball, football, basketball, volleyball, floorball, tennis, badminton, indoor football, a small specialist hall for martial arts, corrective gymnastics and a gym. At Urania local men's volleyball club Indykpol AZS Olsztyn has played its matches as a hosts. A contract for reconstruction was signed in June 2021, after which work began, and was completed at the end of 2023. The rebuilt arena officially opened on December 15, 2023.

== Small arena ==
The arena also holds a small arena (Mała Arena Urania) which is connected to the main arena. The arena's capacity is 1,000. It is home to the handball teams KS Szczypiorniak Olsztyn and Warmia Energia Olsztyn.

== Notable events ==
=== Handball ===
- Poland vs. Israel (7 November 2024)

=== Mixed martial arts ===
- ACB 53: Young Eagles 15 (18 February 2014)
- XTB KSW 95: Wikłacz vs. Przybysz 5 (7 June 2024)
- XTB KSW 108: Soldaev vs. Brichta (19 July 2025)

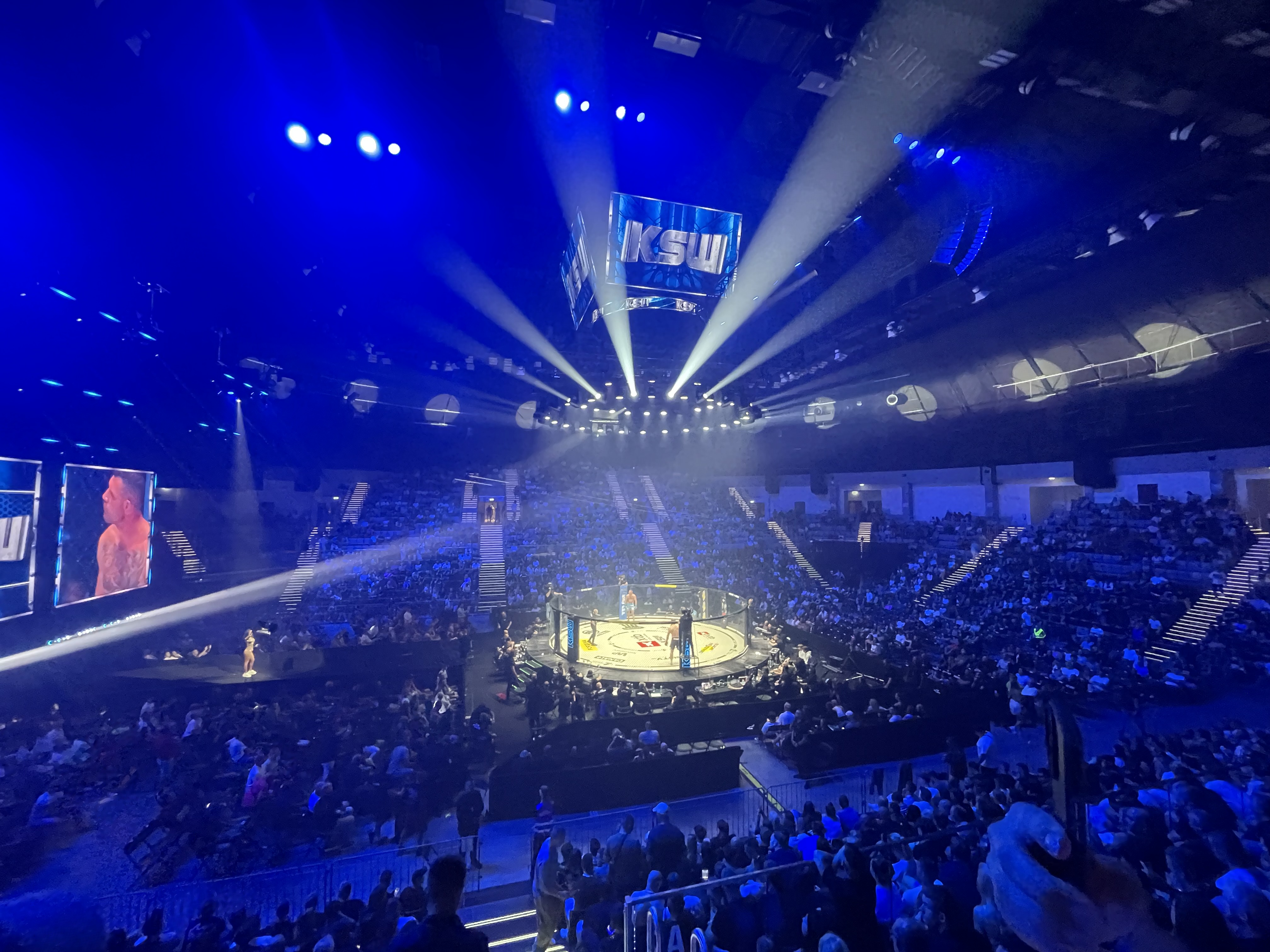
The arena in 2025 during KSW 108

=== Volleyball ===
- 2008 Memorial of Hubert Jerzy Wagner (16–18 May 2008)

=== Other ===
The arena also hosts the annual Stomil Cup event.

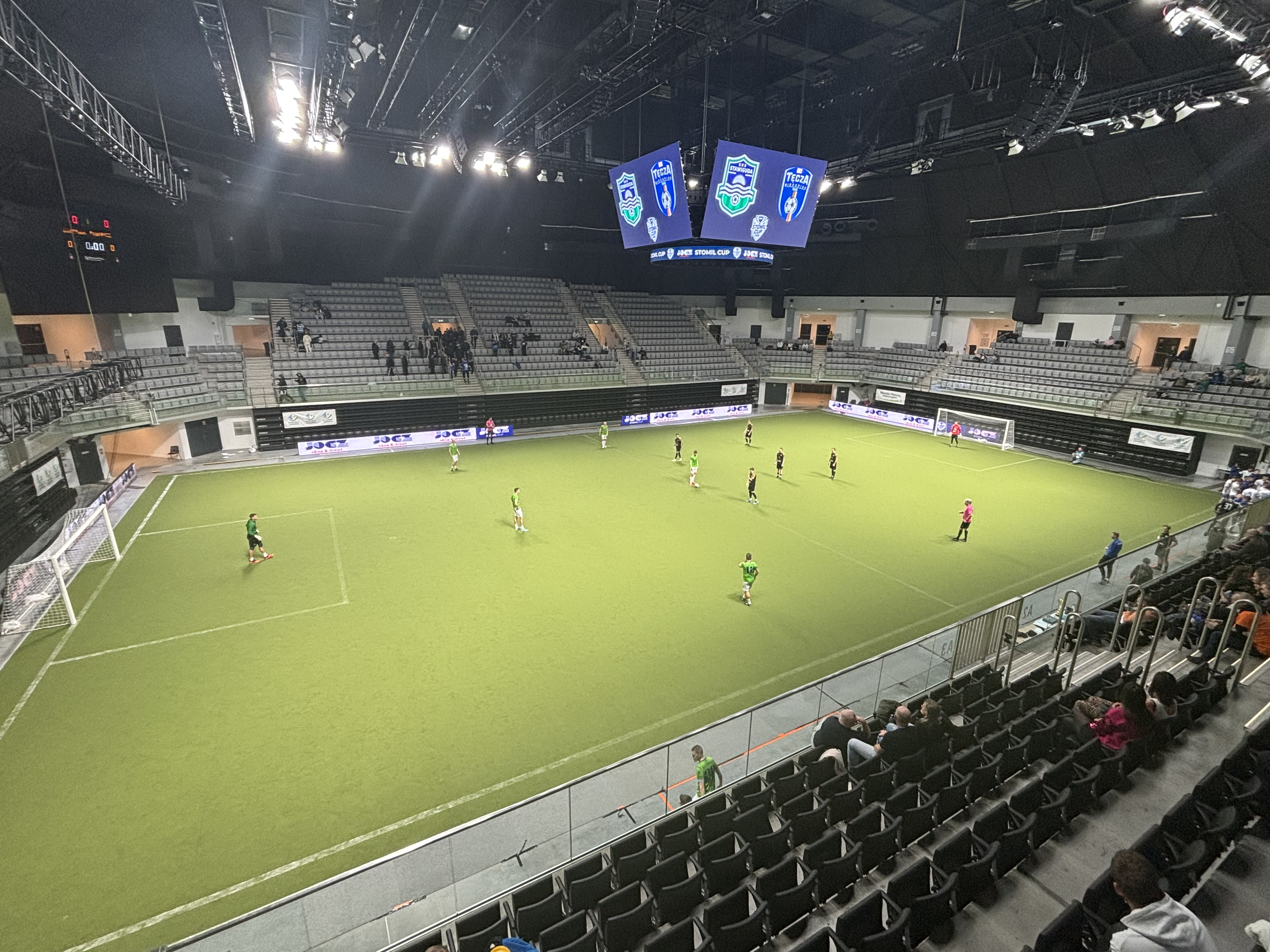
2026 Stomil Cup Senior Tournament Final between GKS Stawiguda and Tęcza Biskupiec
