= Miljan Zdravković =

Serbian mixed martial artist (born 1999)

- Born: May 30, 1999 (age 27); Belgrade, Serbia, FR Yugoslavia
- Native name: Миљан Здравковић
- Other names: Bushido
- Height: 5 ft 7 in (1.70 m)
- Weight: 135 lb (61 kg; 9 st 9 lb)
- Division: Bantamweight (2021–present)
- Reach: 69.7 in (177 cm)
- Fighting out of: Belgrade, Serbia
- Team: Secutor MMA
- Years active: 2021–present

Mixed martial arts record
- Total: 11
- Wins: 11
- By knockout: 5
- By submission: 2
- By decision: 4
- Losses: 0

Other information
- Mixed martial arts record from Sherdog

Miljan Zdravković (Serbian: Миљан Здравковић; born May 30, 1999) is a Serbian professional mixed martial artist. He is the current Fight Nation Championship (FNC) Bantamweight Champion. He has previously competed on KSW, and Brave Combat Federation.

== Professional career ==
=== Early career ===
Zdravković made his professional debut on March 20, 2021, against Andrej Stojanovski. Zdravković won the fight via a second-round TKO.

His next fight came on June 20, 2021, against Benjamin Molnár. Zdravković won the fight via a Unanimous Decision.

=== Brave Combat Federation ===
Zdravković made his debut under Brave Combat Federation on December 18, 2021, against Ahmet Şimşek. Zdravković won the fight via a Unanimous Decision.

=== Konfrontacja Sztuk Walki ===
After accumulating a career record of 6–0, Zdravković made his debut under Polish federation Konfrontacja Sztuk Walki on September 16, 2023, against Mariusz Joniak. Zdravković won the fight via a first-round knockout.

His next fight came on March 16, 2024, against Kamil Szkaradek. Zdravković won the fight via a second-round knockout. This performance earned him his first career Knockout of the Night bonus.

=== Fight Nation Championship ===
==== FNC Bantamweight Champion ====
Zdravković made his debut under Croatian federation Fight Nation Championship on May 24, 2025, against Bondo Kikadze for the vacant FNC Bantamweight Championship. Zdravković won the fight via a second-round submission, winning his first career championship.

His first title defense came on December 20, 2025, against Josh Hill. Zdravković won the fight via a Unanimous Decision.

== Championships and accomplishments ==
=== Mixed martial arts ===
- Fight Nation Championship
  - FNC Bantamweight Champion (One time; current)
    - One successful title defense
- Konfrontacja Sztuk Walki
  - Knockout of the Night (One time)

== Mixed martial arts record ==
Professional record breakdown
11 matches	11 wins	0 losses
By knockout	5	0
By submission	2	0
By decision	4	0

Res.	Record	Opponent	Method	Event	Date	Round	Time	Location	Notes
Win	11–0	Joaquin Vargas	Submission (arm-triangle choke)	FNC 35	November 7, 2026	4	3:32	Podgorica, Montenegro	Defended the FNC Bantamweight Championship.
Win	10–0	Josh Hill	Decision (unanimous)	FNC 26	December 20, 2025	5	5:00	Podgorica, Montenegro	Defended the FNC Bantamweight Championship.
Win	9–0	Bondo Kikadze	Submission (rear-naked choke)	FNC 23	May 24, 2025	2	4:44	Belgrade, Serbia	Won the vacant FNC Bantamweight Championship.
Win	8–0	Kamil Szkaradek	KO (punches)	KSW 92	March 16, 2024	2	1:33	Gorzów Wielkopolski, Poland	Knockout of the Night.
Win	7–0	Mariusz Joniak	KO (punches)	KSW 86	September 16, 2023	1	4:16	Wrocław, Poland	
Win	6–0	Amirjon Gafurov	TKO (punches)	ARMMADA 5	July 8, 2023	3	3:19	Bačka Palanka, Serbia	
Win	5–0	Hugo Vach	Decision (unanimous)	National FC 13	March 25, 2023	3	5:00	Dortmund, Germany	
Win	4–0	Murad Teleev	TKO (head kick and punches)	Elite MMA Championship 10	September 24, 2022	1	1:07	Düsseldorf, Germany	
Win	3–0	Ahmet Şimşek	Decision (unanimous)	Brave CF 56	December 18, 2021	3	5:00	Belgrade, Serbia	
Win	2–0	Benjamin Molnár	Decision (unanimous)	MMA League Round 2	June 20, 2021	3	5:00	Stara Pazova, Serbia	
Win	1–0	Andrej Stojanovski	TKO (punches)	MMA League Round 1	March 20, 2021	2	3:01	Gornji Milanovac, Serbia	Bantamweight debut.

== See also ==
- List of male mixed martial artists
- List of undefeated mixed martial artists
