= Tomasz Sarara =

Polish kickboxer (born 1985)

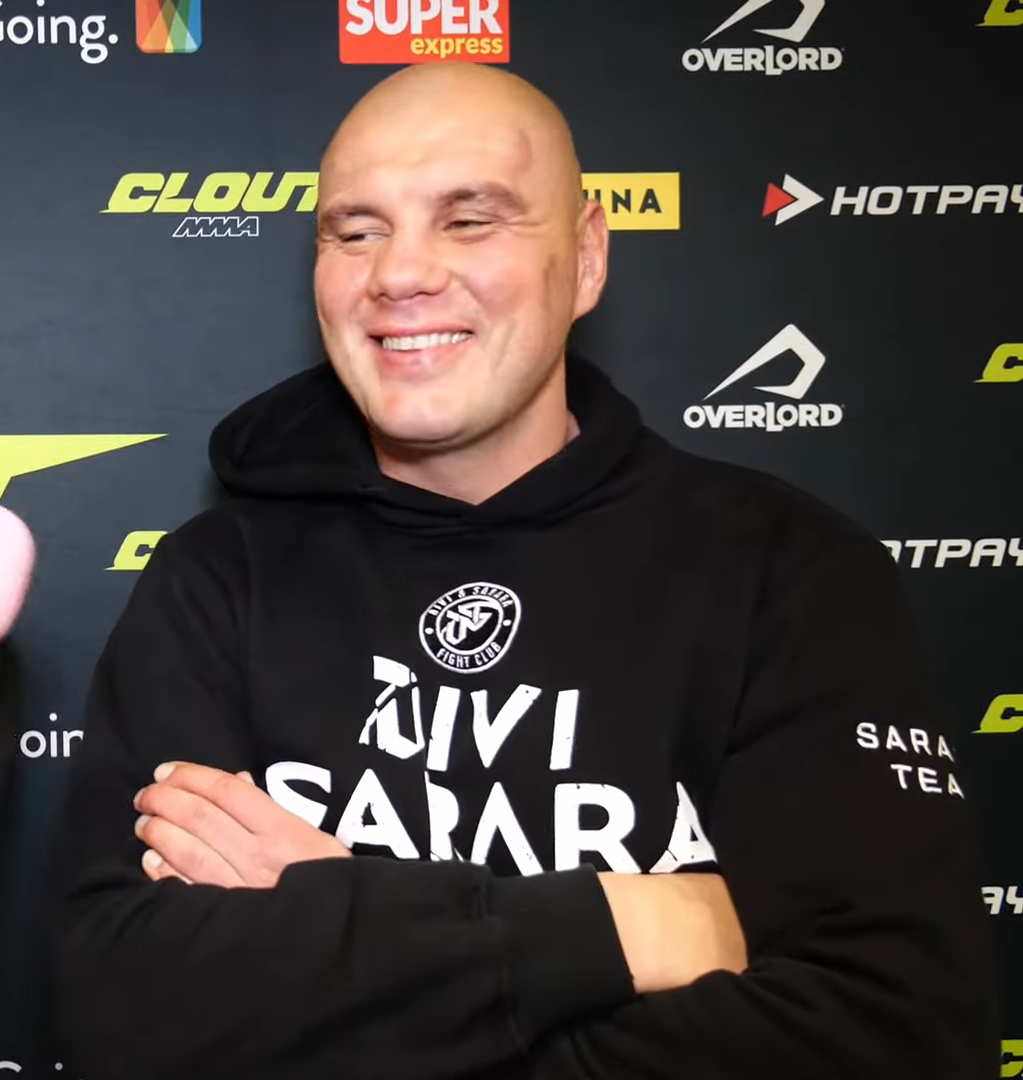
- Sarara in 2023
- Born: 31 May 1985 (age 41); Kraków, Poland
- Nationality: Polish
- Height: 1.90 m (6 ft 3 in)
- Weight: 106 kg (234 lb; 16 st 10 lb)
- Stance: Orthodox
- Fighting out of: Kraków, Poland
- Team: TS Wisła; Sarara Team
- Years active: 2008 - present

Professional boxing record
- Total: 1
- Wins: 1
- By knockout: 1
- Losses: 0

Kickboxing record
- Total: 57
- Wins: 45
- By knockout: 19
- Losses: 11
- By knockout: 0
- Draws: 1

Mixed martial arts record
- Total: 3
- Wins: 1
- By knockout: 1
- Losses: 2
- By knockout: 2

Other information
- Boxing record from BoxRec
- Mixed martial arts record from Sherdog

Tomasz Sarara (born 31 May 1985) is a Polish kickboxer, mixed martial artist, and former professional boxer. He was a kickboxing heavyweight champion in Polish K-1, PZKB, BMAF, Celtic Gladiator, WKN, and DSF kickboxing, as well as a light heavyweight champion in FEN. He is also a two-time Polish low kick champion. Under mixed martial arts rules, He has previously competed on Konfrontacja Sztuk Walki (KSW).

== Professional kickboxing career ==
=== Early career ===
Sarara made his professional debut on March 1, 2008, against Nattahawut Pralomram. Sarara won the fight via a second-round knockout.

On November 30, 2008, Sarara took part in the WAKO European Championships in Porto. He placed second in the tournament, losing to Aleksiej Kudzin in the final.

=== PZKB Heavyweight Champion ===
After accumulating a career record of 6–2, Sarara faced Kamil Sokołowski on May 10, 2009, for the PZKB Heavyweight championship. Sarara won the fight via a first-round TKO, and thus won his first career championship.

=== K-1 World GP 2010 in Warsaw ===
Sarara competed in the 2010 K-1 World GP in Warsaw on March 28, 2010. In the first round, he faced Igor Bugaenko. Sarara won the fight via a third-round TKO. In the semifinals, he faced Dmitri Bezus. Sarara won the fight via a Decision. In the finals, he faced Daniil Sapljoshin. Sarara lost the fight via a first-round TKO, and thus placed second.

=== 2010 Polish Low Kick Champion ===
Sarara competed in the 2010 Polish Low Kick Championships which was kickboxing under low kick rules. The tournament took place on September 19, 2010. In the first round, he faced Dariusz Lipski. Sarara won the fight via a Decision. In the final, he faced Michał Turyński. Sarara won the fight via a Decision, and thus won the 2010 Polish Low Kick Championship.

=== 2012 Taftnet Cup ===
Sarara competed in the 2012 Taftnet Cup. In the first round, he faced Zentai Mate. Sarara won the fight via Unanimous Decision. In the second round, he faced Saulo Cavalari. Sarara won the fight via a Unanimous Decision. In the semi-finals, he faced Vladimir Toksyatynov. Sarara lost the fight via Unanimous Decision.

=== BMAF Heavyweight Champion ===
Sarara faced Daniel Škvor for the BMAF Heavyweight championship on April 21, 2012. Sarara won the fight via a second-round TKO, and thus won his second career title.

=== 2014 Polish Low Kick Champion ===
Sarara competed in the 2014 Polish Low Kick Championships. The tournament took place on March 16, 2014. In the first round, he faced Michał Liberacki. Sarara won the fight via Unanimous Decision. In the semifinals, he faced Wojciech Stawicki. Sarara won the fight via Unanimous Decision. In the finals, he faced Michał Turyński in a rematch. Sarara won the fight via Unanimous Decision, and thus won the 2014 Polish Low Kick Championship.

=== Fight Exclusive Night ===
Sarara made his debut under Fight Exclusive Night on April 24, 2015, against Nikolai Falin. Sarara won the fight via a second-round knockout. This performance earned him a Knockout of the Night bonus.

His next fight came on July 31, 2015, against Andre Schmeling. Sarara won the fight via Unanimous Decision.

His next fight came on March 19, 2016, against Ivan Bartek. Sarara won the fight via Unanimous Decision.

==== FEN K-1 Light Heavyweight Champion ====
On October 15, 2016, Sarara faced Dennis Stolzenbach for the vacant FEN K-1 Light Heavyweight Championship. Sarara won the fight via Unanimous Decision, and thus won the championship.

=== Celtic Gladiator Light Heavyweight Champion ===
Sarara faced Luciano Zampieri on October 6, 2017, for the Celtic Gladiator Light Heavyweight Championship. Sarara won the fight via a first-round TKO.

=== World Kickboxing Network Super Heavyweight Champion ===
Sarara faced Tomáš Možný on May 25, 2018, for the WKN Super Heavyweight Championship. Sarara won the fight via a fourth-round TKO.

=== DSF Heavyweight Champion ===
Sarara faced lineal champion Petr Romankevich for the DSF Heavyweight Championship. Sarara won the fight via a fourth-round knockout.

His first and final title defense came on February 23, 2019, against Abdarhmane Coulibaly. Sarara won the fight via Unanimous Decision.

=== Clout MMA ===
After a four-year layoff, Sarara returned on August 5, 2023, when he took on Jay Silva under K-1 rules. Sarara won the fight via Unanimous Decision.

His next fight came on October 28, 2023, against Dawid Załęcki. The fight ended in a Majority Draw.

=== Strike King ===
Sarara co-founded the federation Strike King. He fought in the first ever main event against Alin Nechita on January 13, 2024. Sarara won the fight via a controversial extra-round decision.

His next fight came on February 1, 2025, against Miroslav Vujović. Sarara lost the fight via Unanimous Decision.

His next fight came on May 30, 2025, against Andrea Oliveri. Sarara won the fight via a second-round TKO.

== Professional boxing career ==
Sarara made his professional boxing debut on September 24, 2016, against Łukasz Zygmunt. Sarara won the fight via a second-round knockout.

== Mixed martial arts career ==
Sarara made his mixed martial arts debut on July 17, 2021, against Filip Bradarić. Sarara won the fight via a third-round TKO.

His next fight came on August 20, 2022, against Arkadiusz Wrzosek. Sarara lost the fight via a third-round TKO. Despite the loss, Sarara earned a Fight of the Night bonus.

His next fight came on April 22, 2023, against Errol Zimmerman. Sarara lost the fight via a second-round TKO. A few days following the fight, Sarara announced his retirement from mixed martial arts.

== Championships and accomplishments ==
=== Kickboxing ===
- 2008 WAKO European Championships Runner-up
- 2009 PZKB Heavyweight Championship (one time; former)
- 2010 K-1 World Grand Prix Runner-up
- 2010 Polish Low Kick Championship winner
- 2012 BMAF Heavyweight Championship (one time; former)
- 2012 Taftnet Cup Runner-up
- 2014 Polish Low Kick Championship winner
- 2015 Fight Exclusive Night Knockout of the Night Bonus
- 2016 Fight Exclusive Night Light Heavyweight Championship (one time; former)
- 2017 Celtic Gladiator Light Heavyweight Championship (one time; former)
- 2018 World Kickboxing Network Super Heavyweight Championship (one time; former)
- 2018 DSF Kickboxing Challenge Heavyweight Championship (one time; former)
  - One successful title defense

=== Mixed martial arts ===
- 2022 Konfrontacja Sztuk Walki Fight of the Night Bonus

== Mixed martial arts record ==
Professional record breakdown
3 matches	1 win	2 losses
By knockout	1	2

Res.	Record	Opponent	Method	Event	Date	Round	Time	Location	Notes
Loss	1–2	Errol Zimmerman	TKO (punches)	KSW 81	April 22, 2023	2	3:53	Tomaszów Mazowiecki, Poland	
Loss	1–1	Arkadiusz Wrzosek	TKO (knees and punches)	KSW 73	August 20, 2022	3	3:55	Warsaw, Poland	Fight of the Night.
Win	1–0	Filip Badarić	TKO (retirement)	KSW 62	July 17, 2021	3	1:51	Warsaw, Poland	Heavyweight debut.

== Kickboxing and K-1 record ==
Professional kickboxing record
45 Wins (19 (T)KOs), 11 Loss, 1 Draw
Date	Result	Opponent	Event	Location	Method	Round	Time
2026-01-24	Loss	(Uzbekistan) Makhmud Muradov	Fame 29: S-Class Tournament	Tarnów, Poland	Decision (Unanimous)	3	3:00
2026-01-24	Win	(Angola) Jay Silva	Fame 29: S-Class Tournament	Tarnów, Poland	TKO (Body Kick)	2	2:07
Fame MMA S-Class Tournament.
2025-07-12	Loss	(Poland) Mateusz Kubiszyn	Fame 26: Gold	Warsaw, Poland	Decision (Unanimous)	3	3:00
2025-07-12	Loss	(Poland) Denis Labryga	Fame 26: Gold	Warsaw, Poland	Decision (Split)	3	3:00
Fame MMA Golden Tournament.
2025-05-30	Win	(Italy) Andrea Oliveri	Strike King 5	Kraków, Poland	TKO (Retirement)	2	1:47
2025-02-01	Loss	(Montenegro) Miroslav Vujović	Strike King 4	Trzebnica, Poland	Decision (Unanimous)	3	3:00
2024-01-13	Win	(Romania) Alin Nechita	Strike King 1	Wieliczka, Poland	Ext R. Decision	4	3:00
2023-10-28	Draw	(Poland) Dawid Załęcki	Clout MMA 2	Płock, Poland	Decision (Majority)	3	3:00
2023-08-05	Win	(Angola) Jay Silva	Clout MMA 1	Warsaw, Poland	Decision (Unanimous)	3	3:00
2019-02-23	Win	(France) Abdarhmane Coulibaly	DSF Kickboxing Challenge 20	Kraków, Poland	Decision (Unanimous)	5	3:00
Defends the DSF Heavyweight (+91kg) Championship.
2018-12-08	Win	(Belarus) Petr Romankevich	DSF Kickboxing Challenge 18	Ząbki, Poland	KO (Head Kick)	4	0:57
Wins the DSF Heavyweight (+91kg) Championship.
2018-05-25	Win	(Slovakia) Tomáš Možný	Boxing Night 14: Narodowa Gala Boksu	Warsaw, Poland	TKO (Referee Stoppage)	4	1:40
Wins the World Kickboxing Network World Super Heavyweight Championship.
2017-12-02	Win	(Latvia) Artur Gorlov	Spartan Fight 9	Chorzów, Poland	Decision (Unanimous)	3	3:00
2017-10-06	Win	(Brazil) Luciano Zampieri	Celtic Gladiator 14	London, England	TKO (Knee and Punches)	1	2:59
Wins the Celtic Gladiator Heavyweight Championship.
2017-09-23	Win	(Ukraine) Andrij Osadchyj	Spartan Fight 8	Kraków, Poland	TKO (Punches)	1	2:42
2017-04-01	Win	(Netherlands) Bas Vorstenbosch	Spartan Fight 7	Chorzów, Poland	Decision (Split)	3	3:00
2016-11-26	Win	(Belarus) Ihar Kamkou	Celtic Gladiator 11	Kraków, Poland	TKO (Referee Stoppage)	2	
2016-10-15	Win	(Netherlands) Dennis Stolzenbach	FEN 14: Silesian Rage	Katowice, Poland	Decision (Unanimous)	3	3:00
Wins Fight Exclusive Night Light Heavyweight Championship.
2016-03-19	Win	(Slovakia) Ivan Bartek	FEN 11: Warsaw Time	Warsaw, Poland	Decision (Unanimous)	3	3:00
2015-07-31	Win	(Germany) Andre Schmeling	FEN 8: Summer Edition	Kołobrzeg, Poland	Decision (Unanimous)	3	3:00
2015-04-24	Win	(Germany) Nikolai Falin	FEN 7: Real Combat	Bydgoszcz, Poland	KO (Punches)	2	0:37
2014-10-25	Win	(Armenia) Jegish Yegoian	Pride of the Royal City	Kraków, Poland	Decision (Unanimous)	3	3:00
2014-06-14	Win	(Poland) Michał Liberacki	Mistrzostwa Polski K-1 Rules	Wrocław, Poland	Decision (Unanimous)	3	3:00
2014-04-11	Win	(Slovakia) Peter Balaž	Battle of Warriors II	Kraków, Poland	TKO (Referee Stoppage)	1	1:24
2014-03-16	Win	(Poland) Michał Turyński	2014 Mistrzostwa Polski w low-kicku	Bełchatów, Poland	Decision (Unanimous)	3	2:00
2014-03-16	Win	(Poland) Wojciech Stawicki	2014 Mistrzostwa Polski w low-kicku	Bełchatów, Poland	Decision (Unanimous)	3	2:00
2014-03-16	Win	(Poland) Michał Liberacki	2014 Mistrzostwa Polski w low-kicku	Bełchatów, Poland	Decision (Unanimous)	3	2:00
2014 Polish Low Kick Championship.
2014-01-31	Win	(Russia) Turpal Tokaev	Tatneft Cup 2014 – 2nd selection 1/8 final	Kazan, Russia	Ext. R. Decision (Unanimous)	3	3:00
2013-10-12	Win	(Poland) Michał Wlazło	Battle of Warriors	Kraków, Poland	Decision (Unanimous)	3	3:00
2013-05-05	Win	(Poland) Wojciech Jastrzębski	Nowotarska Gala Drużyny Mistrzów	Nowy Targ, Poland	KO (Punch)	2	2:00
2012-07-19	Loss	(Kazakhstan) Vladimir Toktasynov	Tatneft Cup 2012	Kazan, Russia	Ext. R. Decision (Unanimous)	3	3:00
2012-06-20	Loss	(Russia) Vladimir Mineev	Fight Nights: Battle On Kama	Perm, Russia	Decision (Unanimous)	5	3:00
2012-06-02	Win	(Brazil) Saulo Cavalari	Tatneft Cup 2012 2nd selection 1/4 final	Kazan, Russia	Decision (Unanimous)	3	3:00
2012-05-20	Win	(United States) Alex Roberts	Hoost Cup	Nagoya, Japan	Decision (Unanimous)	3	3:00
2012-04-21	Win	(Czech Republic) Daniel Škvor	Battles of The Dragons 6	Pomiechówek, Poland	TKO (Punches)	2	2:42
Wins Baltic Martial Arts Federation Heavyweight Championship.
2012-03-24	Win	(Poland) Damian Trzciński	Winner Punch 2	Piła, Poland	Decision (Unanimous)	3	3:00
2012-02-24	Win	(Hungary) Mate Zentai	Tatneft Cup 2012 2nd selection 1/8 final	Kazan, Russia	Decision (Unanimous)	3	3:00
2011-12-04	Win	(Poland) Karol Celiński	King of Sanda	Warsaw, Poland	Decision (Unanimous)	3	3:00
Sanda rules.
2010-11-19	Loss	(Poland) Daniel Trzciński	Gala MMA i K-1 w Bydgoszczy	Bydgoszcz, Poland	Decision (Unanimous)	3	3:00
2010-09-19	Win	(Poland) Michał Turyński	2010 Mistrzostwa Polski w low-kicku	Świebodzice, Poland	Decision (Unanimous)	2	2:00
2010-09-19	Win	(Poland) Dariusz Lipski	2010 Mistrzostwa Polski w low-kicku	Świebodzice, Poland	Decision (Unanimous)	3	2:00
2010 Polish Low Kick Championship.
2010-03-28	Loss	(Estonia) Daniil Sapljoshin	K-1 World GP 2010 in Warsaw	Warsaw, Poland	KO (High Kick)	1	1:34
2010-03-28	Win	(Ukraine) Dmitri Bezus	K-1 World GP 2010 in Warsaw	Warsaw, Poland	Ext. R. Decision (Unanimous)	3	3:00
2010-03-28	Win	(Belarus) Igor Bugaenko	K-1 World GP 2010 in Warsaw	Warsaw, Poland	TKO (Retirement)	3	1:04
K-1 World Grand Prix 2010.
2010-01-30	Loss	(Netherlands) Rodney Glunder	Beast of the East	Zutphen, Netherlands	Decision (Unanimous)	3	3:00
2009-12-05	Win	(Turkey) Yahya Gulay	Mix Fight Gala IX	Darmstadt, Germany	TKO (Doctor Stoppage)	2	1:45
2009-11-14	Win	(Poland) Dariusz Lipski	Beast of the East	Gdynia, Poland	KO (High Kick)	2	0:44
2009-10-03	Win	?	Kickboxing Event Germany	Oberhausen, Germany	TKO	1	
2009-05-10	Win	(Poland) Kamil Sokołowski	Angels of Fire V	Płock, Poland	TKO (Punches)	1	2:37
Wins PZKB Heavyweight Championship.
2009-04-11	Loss	(Spain) Jorge Loren	Fight for Delight	Almelo, Netherlands	Decision (Unanimous)	3	3:00
2009-01-24	Win	(Netherlands) Frits Mijnen	Beast of the East	Zutphen, Netherlands	Decision (Unanimous)	3	3:00
2008-11-30	Loss	(Belarus) Alexey Kudin	2008 WAKO European Championships	Porto, Portugal	Ext. R. Decision (Unanimous)	3	3:00
2008-11-30	Win	(Serbia) Mladen Bozić	2008 WAKO European Championships	Porto, Portugal	Ext. R. Decision (Unanimous)	3	3:00
2008-11-30	Win	(Croatia) Ivan Bijelić	2008 WAKO European Championships	Porto, Portugal	Ext. R. Decision (Unanimous)	3	3:00
WAKO European Championships 2008.
2008-11-09	Win	(Netherlands) Rik van der Soest	Ultimate Glory 10: The Battle of Arnhem	Arnhem, Netherlands	Decision (Unanimous)	3	3:00
2008-07-18	Win	(Poland) Daniel Omielańczuk	Gala Sportów Walki	Kołobrzeg, Poland	Decision (Unanimous)	3	3:00
2008-03-01	Win	(Germany) Nattahawut Pralomram	WKN Poland / Gala K-1	Wołów, Poland	KO	1	

== Professional boxing record ==
1 fight	1 win	0 losses
By knockout	1	0

No.	Result	Record	Opponent	Type	Round, time	Date	Location	Notes
1	Win	1–0	Łukasz Zygmunt	KO	2 (4), 1:35	24 Sep 2016	Arena Kalisz, Kalisz, Poland	

== Exhibition boxing record ==
1 fight	0 wins	1 loss
By decision	0	1

No.	Result	Record	Opponent	Type	Round, time	Date	Location	Notes
1	Loss	0–1	Daniel Płonka	UD	3	6 Jun 2026	Hala Podpromie, Rzeszów, Poland	
