= Denis Labryga =

Polish mixed martial artist (born 1996)

- Born: March 1, 1996 (age 30); Głogów, Poland
- Other names: Final Boss
- Height: 6 ft 4 in (1.93 m)
- Weight: 259 lb (117 kg; 18 st 7 lb)
- Division: Heavyweight (2022–)
- Reach: 76 in (193 cm)
- Style: Kickboxing
- Stance: Orthodox
- Fighting out of: Warsaw, Poland
- Team: WCA Fight Team
- Years active: 2022–present

Kickboxing record
- Total: 5
- Wins: 5
- By knockout: 3

Mixed martial arts record
- Total: 4
- Wins: 3
- By knockout: 2
- By decision: 1
- Losses: 1
- By disqualification: 1

Other information
- Mixed martial arts record from Sherdog

Denis Labryga (born March 1, 1996) is a Polish professional mixed martial artist and kickboxer. He currently competes in the Heavyweight division for Fame MMA.

== Bare-knuckle MMA career ==
Labryga made his Bare Knuckle MMA debut on January 21, 2022 against Piotr Więcławski. Labryga won the fight via a second round knockout.

His next fight came nine months later in a rematch against Piotr Więcławski. Labryga yet again defeated Więcławski via a first round knockout.

== Mixed martial arts career ==
Labryga made his professional mixed martial arts debut on March 18, 2023 against Konrad Karwat. Labryga won the fight via a first round TKO.

=== Babilon MMA ===
His next fight came over a year and a half later against Karol Frąckowiak under Babilon MMA. Labryga won the fight via a first round TKO.

=== Fame MMA ===
His next fight came two months later against former ONE Championship and Oktagon MMA fighter Michał Pasternak. Labryga lost the fight due to an illegal knee in the first round, and thus dropping to 2–1.

He returned two months later against former KSW and UFC fighter Jay Silva. Labryga won the fight via Unanimous Decision.

== Kickboxing career ==
=== Clout MMA ===
Labryga made his kickboxing debut on August 5, 2023 against Dawid Załęcki. Labryga won the fight via a first round TKO.

He returned two months later against former Oktagon MMA and FEN fighter Kamil Minda. Labryga won the fight via a second round TKO.

=== Fame MMA Golden Tournament ===
Just under two years later, Labryga returned to kickboxing in the Fame MMA Golden Tournament which took place on July 12, 2025. In the first round, he faced former KSW, FEN, and K-1 fighter Tomasz Sarara. Labryga won the fight via split decision. In the next round, he faced Alberto Simao. Labryga would win after Simao suffered a leg injury in the first round. In the final round, he faced Mateusz Kubiszyn. Labryga won the fight via a Technical Decision after Kubiszyn suffered a low blow. In the end, Labryga won the tournament and a prize of 1,000,000 PLN.

== Mixed martial arts record ==
Professional record breakdown
4 matches	3 wins	1 loss
By knockout	2	0
By decision	1	0
By disqualification	0	1

Res.	Record	Opponent	Method	Event	Date	Round	Time	Location	Notes
Win	3–1	Jay Silva	Decision (unanimous)	Fame 25	April 5, 2025	3	5:00	Częstochowa, Poland	
Loss	2–1	Michał Pasternak	DQ (illegal knee)	Fame 24: Underground	February 8, 2025	1	2:54	Warsaw, Poland	
Win	2–0	Karol Frąckowiak	TKO (punches)	Babilon MMA 50	December 7, 2024	1	2:10	Ożarów Mazowiecki, Poland	
Win	1–0	Konrad Karwat	TKO (punches)	High League 6	March 18, 2023	1	2:55	Katowice, Poland	

== Kickboxing record ==
Professional kickboxing record
5 Wins (3 (T)KOs), 1 Loss, 0 Draw
Date	Result	Opponent	Event	Location	Method	Round	Time
2026-03-21	Loss	(Uzbekistan) Makhmud Muradov	Fame 30: Icons	Gliwice, Poland	Decision (unanimous)	3	3:00
For vacant Fame Heavyweight Title.
2025-07-12	Win	(Poland) Mateusz Kubiszyn	Fame 26: Gold	Warsaw, Poland	Decision (technical)	1	10:02
2025-07-12	Win	(Poland) Alberto Simao	Fame 26: Gold	Warsaw, Poland	TKO (leg injury)	1	1:44
2025-07-12	Win	(Poland) Tomasz Sarara	Fame 26: Gold	Warsaw, Poland	Decision (split)	3	3:00
Fame MMA Golden Tournament.
2023-10-28	Win	(Poland) Kamil Minda	Clout MMA 2	Płock, Poland	TKO (doctor stoppage)	2	3:00
2023-08-05	Win	(Poland) Dawid Załęcki	Clout MMA 1	Warsaw, Poland	TKO (doctor stoppage)	1	3:00

== Bare-knuckle MMA record ==
Professional record breakdown
2 matches	2 wins	0 losses
By knockout	2	0

Res.	Record	Opponent	Method	Event	Date	Round	Time	Location	Notes
Win	2–0	Piotr Więcławski	TKO (punches)	Wotore 6: Wielki Rewanż	October 21, 2022	1	2:50	Konstancin-Jeziorna, Poland	
Win	1–0	Piotr Więcławski	TKO (punches)	Wotore 4	January 21, 2022	2	2:10	Katowice, Poland	
