= Jay Silva =

Brazilian mixed martial arts fighter (1981–2026)

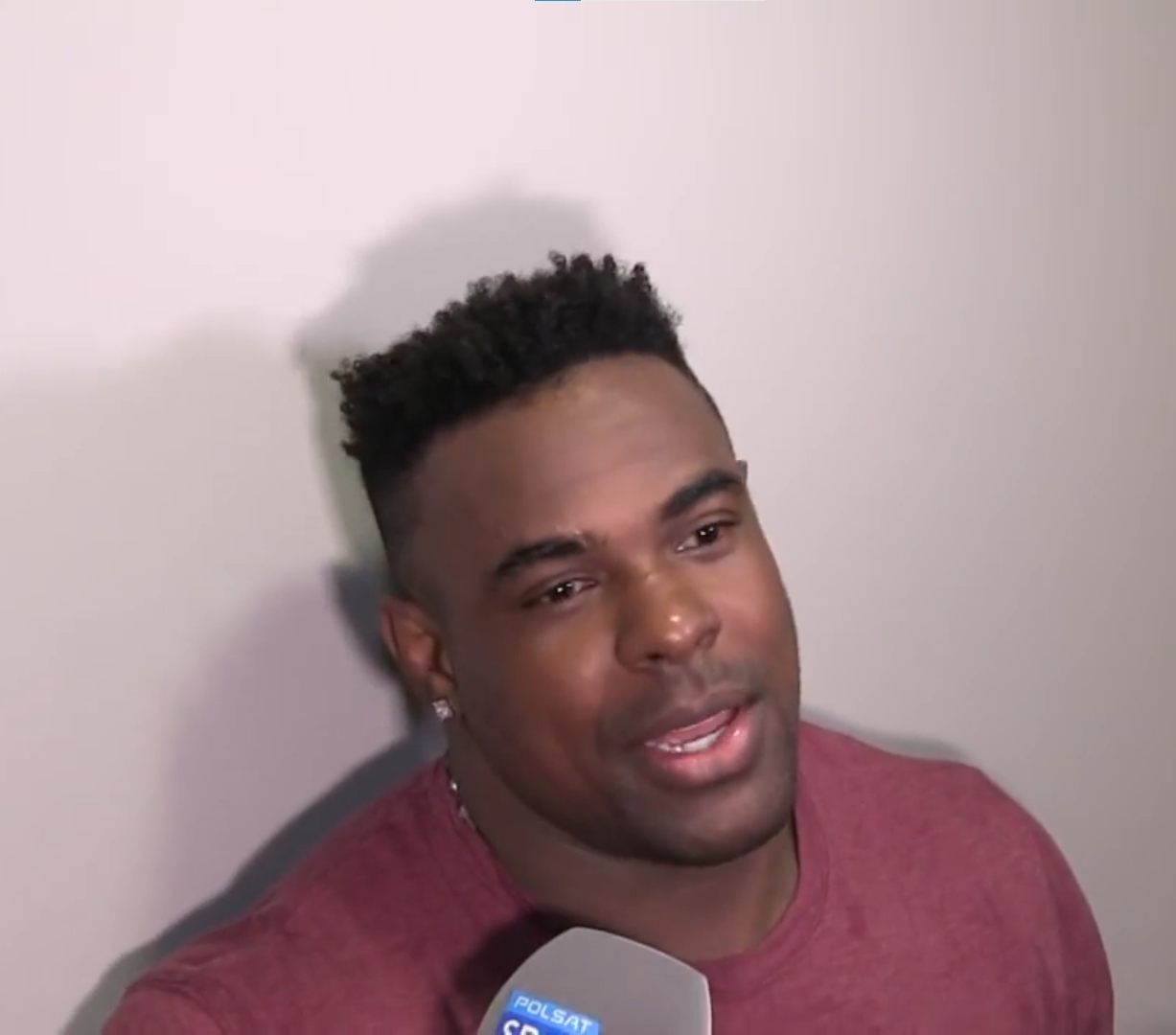
- Silva in 2017
- Born: May 25, 1981; Luanda, Angola
- Died: May 31, 2026 (aged 45)
- Other names: The Spider Killer
- Nationality: American
- Height: 6 ft 2 in (1.88 m)
- Weight: 225.8 lb (102.4 kg; 16.13 st)
- Division: Heavyweight; Light Heavyweight; Middleweight
- Reach: 75 in (191 cm)
- Stance: Southpaw
- Fighting out of: Huntington Beach, California, United States
- Team: MPF Training Systems
- Rank: Purple belt in Brazilian Jiu-Jitsu
- Years active: 2008–2026

Mixed martial arts record
- Total: 25
- Wins: 12
- By knockout: 6
- By submission: 3
- By decision: 3
- Losses: 12
- By knockout: 4
- By decision: 8
- Draws: 1

Other information
- Mixed martial arts record from Sherdog

Jay Silva (May 25, 1981 – May 31, 2026) was an Angolan-born American mixed martial artist, competing in the Heavyweight division. A professional competitor since 2008, Silva has also formerly competed for the UFC, Bellator, the MFC, KSW, and Tachi Palace Fights.

== Mixed martial arts career ==
=== Early career ===
Raised on the East Coast, Silva's interest in mixed martial arts developed after seeing the first season of The Ultimate Fighter, and he subsequently trained under Renzo Gracie in Brazilian jiu-jitsu, having obtained the level of purple belt, and began a professional career in mixed martial arts. Silva was a Grapplers Quest Champion for both the Heavyweight and Absolute weight divisions.

=== Ultimate Fighting Championship ===
Competing primarily in smaller organizations, Silva received a call from the UFC to fill in as a last minute replacement for Dan Miller and made his debut against CB Dollaway at UFC Fight Night: Diaz vs. Guillard losing a unanimous decision.

Silva's next fight was against Chris Leben on January 11, 2010, at UFC Fight Night 20, losing via unanimous decision (30-27, 30-27, 30-27). Silva was released from the UFC along with Kyle Bradley after his loss at UFC Fight Night 20.

=== Bellator ===
Silva stepped in for Paulo Filho, who was set to fight the Bellator Middleweight Champion Hector Lombard in a Super Fight at Bellator 18. Silva was defeated via Knockout in just six seconds of the first round.

On May 14, 2011, Silva defeated Gemiyale Adkins at Bellator 44 via unanimous decision.

=== Independent promotions ===
Silva scored a first round KO over MMA veteran Jaime Jara at Tachi Palace Fights 7, ending the bout in 33 seconds.

On November 4, 2011, Silva lost a five round unanimous decision to Bristol Marunde in a bout for the Superior Cage Combat Middleweight Championship.

Silva next faced fellow UFC veteran Kendall Grove on February 16 in Las Vegas, Nevada, under the Superior Cage Combat organization. He won the fight via technical submission due to an arm triangle choke in the second round.

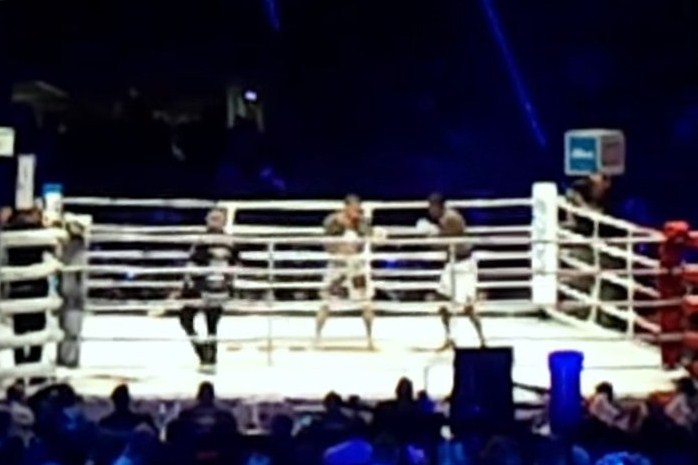
Silva during the fight with Michał Materla at the event KSW 19

He then fought on May 12, 2012, against Michał Materla at KSW 19 for the vacant Middleweight Championship. Silva lost the fight via majority decision.

He faced Michał Materla on September 28, 2013, at KSW 24 in a non-title rematch from KSW 19. Silva won via knockout due to punches in the second round.

=== Maximum Fighting Championship ===
On November 30, 2012, it was announced that Silva signed a multi-fight contract with Maximum Fighting Championship he was set to debut at MFC 36 “Reality Check” against Jacen Flynn on February 15, 2013, in Edmonton, Alberta, Canada. On February 11, 2013, MFC Announced Wes Swofford as Flynn's Replacement. Silva was defeated by Swofford via TKO due to an elbow and punches in 41 seconds of round one.

Silva faced Ultimate Fighter alumni Sam Alvey on May 10, 2013, at MFC 37 “True Grit”. Silva was defeated by Alvey via TKO due to punches in round three.

=== Other promotions ===
Silva faced Oscar Cota in a heavyweight bout at Golden Boy Promotions inaugural MMA event on November 24, 2018. He won the fight via technical submission in the third round.

== Death ==
On June 1, 2026, Fame MMA, the federation Silva last competed for, announced that Silva had died on May 31 of unknown causes, at the age of 45.

== Mixed martial arts record ==
Professional record breakdown
| 25 matches | 12 wins | 13 losses |
| By knockout | 6 | 4 |
| By submission | 3 | 0 |
| By decision | 3 | 9 |

| Res. | Record | Opponent | Method | Event | Date | Round | Time | Location | Notes |
|---|---|---|---|---|---|---|---|---|---|
| Loss | 12–13–1 | Denis Labryga | Decision (unanimous) | Fame 25 | April 5, 2025 | 3 | 5:00 | Częstochowa, Poland | |
| Win | 12–12–1 | Oscar Cota | Technical Submission (arm-triangle choke) | Golden Boy Promotions: Liddell vs. Ortiz 3 | November 24, 2018 | 3 | 2:13 | Inglewood, California, United States | |
| Win | 11–12–1 | Zsolta Balla | Decision (unanimous) | Serbian Battle Championship 17 | April 28, 2018 | 3 | 5:00 | Odzaci, Serbia | |
| Loss | 10–12–1 | Mariusz Pudzianowski | Decision (majority) | KSW 40 | October 22, 2017 | 3 | 5:00 | Dublin, Ireland | Heavyweight debut. |
| Loss | 10–11–1 | Tim Williams | Decision (unanimous) | Cage Fury FC 63 | February 18, 2017 | 3 | 5:00 | Atlantic City, New Jersey, United States | |
| Win | 10–10–1 | Guram Mestvirishvili | Decision (unanimous) | Ring of Combat 54 | March 4, 2016 | 3 | 5:00 | Atlantic City, New Jersey, United States | |
| Loss | 9–10–1 | Aziz Karaoglu | TKO (punches) | KSW 31 | May 23, 2015 | 1 | 1:48 | Gdańsk, Poland | |
| Draw | 9–9–1 | Piotr Strus | Draw (unanimous) | KSW 29 | December 6, 2014 | 3 | 5:00 | Kraków, Poland | |
| Loss | 9–9 | Michał Materla | Decision (unanimous) | KSW 26 | March 22, 2014 | 3 | 5:00 | Warsaw, Poland | For the KSW Middleweight Championship. Fight of the Night. |
| Win | 9–8 | Michał Materla | KO (punches) | KSW 24 | September 28, 2013 | 2 | 4:05 | Łódź, Poland | Non-title bout. Knockout of the Night. |
| Loss | 8–8 | Sam Alvey | TKO (punches) | Maximum FC 37 | May 10, 2013 | 3 | 1:05 | Edmonton, Alberta, Canada | Catchweight (186.6 lb) bout; Silva missed weight. |
| Loss | 8–7 | Wes Swofford | TKO (elbow and punches) | Maximum FC 36 | February 15, 2013 | 1 | 0:41 | Edmonton, Alberta, Canada | |
| Loss | 8–6 | Michał Materla | Decision (majority) | KSW 19 | May 12, 2012 | 3 | 5:00 | Łódź, Poland | For the vacant KSW Middleweight Championship. Fight of the Night. |
| Win | 8–5 | Kendall Grove | Technical Submission (arm-triangle choke) | Superior Cage Combat 4 | February 16, 2012 | 2 | 1:52 | Las Vegas, Nevada, United States | |
| Loss | 7–5 | Bristol Marunde | Decision (unanimous) | Superior Cage Combat 3 | November 4, 2011 | 5 | 5:00 | Las Vegas, Nevada, United States | For the SCC Middleweight Championship. |
| Win | 7–4 | Gemiyale Adkins | Decision (unanimous) | Bellator 44 | May 14, 2011 | 3 | 5:00 | Atlantic City, New Jersey, United States | |
| Win | 6–4 | Jaime Jara | KO (punches) | Tachi Palace Fights 7 | December 2, 2010 | 1 | 0:33 | Lemoore, California, United States | |
| Loss | 5–4 | Hector Lombard | KO (punch) | Bellator 18 | May 13, 2010 | 1 | 0:06 | Monroe, Louisiana, United States | Catchweight (190 lb) bout. |
| Loss | 5–3 | Chris Leben | Decision (unanimous) | UFC Fight Night: Maynard vs. Diaz | January 11, 2010 | 3 | 5:00 | Fairfax, Virginia, United States | |
| Loss | 5–2 | C. B. Dollaway | Decision (unanimous) | UFC Fight Night: Diaz vs. Guillard | September 16, 2009 | 3 | 5:00 | Oklahoma City, Oklahoma, United States | Middleweight debut. |
| Win | 5–1 | Ray Lizama | KO (punches) | Call to Arms 2 | August 15, 2009 | 3 | 1:56 | Ontario, California, United States | |
| Win | 4–1 | Reggie Orr | KO (flying knee) | Call to Arms 1 | May 16, 2009 | 2 | 1:41 | Ontario, California, United States | |
| Win | 3–1 | Mike Johnson | TKO (punches) | Extreme Challenge: Mayhem at the Marina | March 28, 2009 | 2 | 1:26 | Atlantic City, New Jersey, United States | |
| Loss | 2–1 | Plinio Cruz | Decision (split) | Karriem Abdallah Productions: The Return of Macaco | February 7, 2009 | 3 | 5:00 | Newark, New Jersey, United States | |
| Win | 2–0 | Ozzy Avalos | KO (knee) | Spar Star Promotions: Battle of the Rising Stars | July 25, 2008 | 3 | 0:42 | Montebello, California, United States | |
| Win | 1–0 | Mark DaPolito | Submission (rear-naked choke) | Ring of Combat 20 | June 27, 2008 | 2 | 3:47 | Atlantic City, New Jersey, United States | Light Heavyweight debut. |

== Kickboxing record ==
Professional kickboxing record
0 Wins (0 (T)KOs), 2 Losses, 0 Draw
| Date | Result | Opponent | Event | Location | Method | Round | Time |
| 2026-01-24 | Win | (Poland) Tomasz Sarara | Fame 29: S-Class Tournament | Tarnów, Poland | TKO (Body Kick) | 2 | N/A |
Fame MMA S-Class Tournament.
| 2023-08-05 | Loss | (Poland) Tomasz Sarara | Clout MMA 1 | Warsaw, Poland | Decision (Unanimous) | 3 | 3:00 |
