= Jegish Yegoian =

Dutch-Armenian heavyweight kickboxer (born 1990)

- Born: 12 October 1990 (age 36); Gyumri, Armenia
- Other names: Jego
- Nationality: Armenian
- Height: 1.88 m (6 ft 2 in)
- Weight: 100 kg (220 lb; 16 st)
- Division: Heavyweight
- Style: Thai boxing, Kickboxing
- Stance: Orthodox
- Fighting out of: Almere, Netherlands
- Team: Simson Gym (Previous); Hemmer's Gym (Current)
- Trainer: Cor Hemmers
- Years active: 2010 - present

Kickboxing record
- Total: 41
- Wins: 31
- By knockout: 8
- Losses: 8
- By knockout: 1
- Draws: 2

Other information
- Boxing record from BoxRec

Jegish Yegoian (Armenian: Եղիշ Եգոյան; born 28 January 1993) is a Dutch-Armenian heavyweight kickboxer. He is the former I.S.K.A. World Heavyweight champion and the 2013 Superkombat World Grand Prix IV Tournament winner.

== Kickboxing career ==
Yegoian achieved his first notable win in October 2013, when he defeated Mustapha Hachioni by decision. He would go on to win his next three fights, including a notable win over D'Angelo Marshall. He then entered the 2013 Superkombat World Grand Prix IV. He beat Ibrahim Aarab by split decision in the semifinal, and won the tournament with a unanimous decision win against Thomas Vanneste. This victory earned him a place in the Superkombat Final Elimination tournament, facing Redouan Cairo in the quarterfinals. Cairo won the fight by unanimous decision.

In his next fight, Yegoian fought Horace Martin for the W.F.C.A. Thaiboxing World Heavyweight title. Martin won the fight by a second-round knockout.

After his failed title bid, Yegoian won his next fight against Marcello Adriaansz by majority decision. He continued trading wins and losses, losing to Tomasz Sarara, defeating Dennis Stolzenbach and losing once again to Sergio Piqué.

In 2015, Yegoian fought in three straight title fights. He first won the ISKA World heavyweight oriental rules title with an extra round decision win against Athanasios Kasapis, which was followed with a decision win against Clyde Brunswijk to win the King Of Almere championship. In his last fight of 2015, Yegoian beat Jeroen de Groot by a second-round knockout to win the IRO World Muay Thai championship.

Yegoian fought with Tatneft Cup in 2019, defeating Sergey Mavliutov by a third-round knockout in the first round of the 2019 Cup. He took part in the tournament as a replacement for Roman Kryklia, while Mavliutov came in as a replacement for Enver Šljivar, who was sidelined with visa issues. In the Tatneft Cup quarterfinals, he won an extra round decision against Gokhan Gedik. He briefly fought away from Tatneft, losing a unanimous decision to Artur Gorlov at Glory 66. He was supposed to fight Francesco Xhaja in the Tatneft Cup semifinal, but was forced to withdraw with an arm fracture, suffered during training.

== Titles ==
- 2016 IRO World Muay Thai Champion
- 2015 I.S.K.A. Oriental Rules World Heavyweight Champion (-100 kg; 220 lbs)
- 2013 Superkombat World Grand Prix IV Tournament Champion

== Kickboxing record ==
Kickboxing record
31 Wins (8 (T)KO's), 8 Losses, 2 Draw
Date	Result	Opponent	Event	Location	Method	Round	Time
2019-08-24	Win	(Turkey) Gokhan Gedik	2019 Tatneft Cup, Quarterfinal	Kazan, Russia	Decision (Extra round)	4	3:00
2019-06-22	Loss	(Latvia) Artur Gorlov	Glory 66: Paris	Paris, France	Decision (Unanimous)	3	3:00
2019-02-21	Win	(Russia) Sergey Mavlyutov	2019 Tatneft Cup First Round	Kazan, Russia	KO	3	
2017-03-18	Loss	(Cape Verde) Luis Tavares	Enfusion Live 47	Nijmegen, Netherlands	Decision (Unanimous)	3	3:00
2016-10-08	Win	(Netherlands) Jeroen de Groot	Warriors Part 4	Norg, Netherlands	KO	2	
Wins IRO World Muay Thai Championship.
2015-11-28	Win	(Suriname) Clyde Brunswijk	Ring Strs	Almere, Netherlands	Decision	5	3:00
For The King Of Almere Championship.
2015-09-12	Win	(Greece) Athanasios Kasapis	Its Fight Time II	Darmstadt, Germany	Ext. R. Decision (unanimous)	6	3:00
Wins I.S.K.A. Oriental Rules World Heavyweight title (-100kg; 220lbs).
2015-06-27	Loss	(Suriname) Sergio Piqué	Ringstars Event Gala	Almere, Netherlands	Decision	5	3:00
For The IRO World Title Fight.
2015-02-07	Win	(Netherlands) Dennis Stolzenbach	Enfusion Live 24	Eindhoven, Netherlands	Decision	3	3:00
2014-10-25	Loss	(Poland) Tomasz Sarara	Pride of the Royal City	Kraków, Poland	Decision (Unanimous)	3	3:00
2014-09-27	Win	(Suriname) Marcello Adriaansz	SUPERKOMBAT World Grand Prix IV 2014	Almere, Netherlands	Decision (majority)	3	3:00
2014-04-21	Loss	(Jamaica) Boy Boy Martin	Born 2 Fight	Elst, Netherlands	KO	2	
For The W.F.C.A. Thaiboxing World Championship -95 kg.
2013-11-09	Loss	(Suriname) Redouan Cairo	SUPERKOMBAT World Grand Prix 2013 Final Elimination, Quarter Finals	Ploiești, Romania	Decision (Unanimous)	3	3:00
2013-10-12	Win	(Belgium) Thomas Vanneste	SUPERKOMBAT World Grand Prix IV 2013, Final	Giurgiu, Romania	Decision (unanimous)	3	3:00
Wins SUPERKOMBAT World Grand Prix IV tournament title.
2013-10-12	Win	(Morocco) Ibrahim Aarab	SUPERKOMBAT World Grand Prix IV 2013, Semi Finals	Giurgiu, Romania	Decision (split)	3	3:00
2013-06-29	Win	(Curaçao) D'Angelo Marshall	Death Before Dishonor - Part III	Almere, Netherlands	Decision	3	3:00
2011-12-10	Win	(Netherlands) Mitchel Tramper	2 the MAXX	Hoogeveen, Netherlands	Decision	3	3:00
2011-10-09	Win	(Morocco) Youssef el Yacoubi	Death before Dishonor 2	Almere, Netherlands	Decision	5	2:00
2010-10-03	Win	(Morocco) Mustapha Hachioni	Memento Mori part 1	Rotterdam, Netherlands	Decision	5	2:00
Legend: Win Loss Draw/No contest Notes

== See also ==
- List of It's Showtime events
- List of It's Showtime champions
- List of male kickboxers
