= Mateusz Kubiszyn =

Polish fighter (born 1991)

- Born: 18 July 1991 (age 35); Lubaczów, Poland
- Nickname: Don Diego
- Height: 1.82 m (5 ft 11 1/2 in)
- Weight: 90 kg (198 lb; 14 st 2 lb)
- Division: Heavyweight
- Stance: Orthodox
- Fighting out of: Rzeszów, Poland
- Team: Klub Sportów Walki „Sokół” Jarosław; KKS Sporty Walki Poznań; ZKS Stal Rzeszów; Ankos MMA
- Years active: 2016-present

Professional boxing record
- Total: 7
- Wins: 3
- By knockout: 2
- Losses: 4

Kickboxing record
- Total: 14
- Wins: 7
- By knockout: 0
- Losses: 6
- By knockout: 0
- Draws: 1

Mixed martial arts record
- Total: 2
- Wins: 1
- Losses: 1

Other information
- Boxing record from BoxRec
- Mixed martial arts record from Sherdog

Mateusz Kubiszyn (born 18 July 1991) is a Polish bare-knuckle boxer, kickboxer, and former mixed martial artist, and professional boxer. He is the current Gromda Champion. He is currently ranked #1 pound for pound globally in bare-knuckle boxing according to BoxRec.

== Kickboxing career ==
=== Early career ===
Kubiszyn made his professional debut on December 16, 2016, against Maksymilian Bratkowicz. Kubiszyn won the fight via a Unanimous Decision.

His next fight came on September 29, 2017, against Damian Pasiek. Kubiszyn won the fight via a Unanimous Decision.

His next fight came on December 8, 2017, against Yurii Zubchuk. Kubiszyn lost the fight via a Unanimous Decision.

He faced Maksymilian Bratkowicz in a rematch for the DSF Light Heavyweight Championship on February 3, 2018. Kubiszyn lost the fight via a Unanimous Decision.

=== PZKB Light Heavyweight Champion ===
He faced Kacper Frątczak for the PZKB Light Heavyweight Championship on June 16, 2018. Kubiszyn won the fight via a Split Decision, winning his first career championship in the process.

=== Fight Exclusive Night ===
Kubiszyn made his debut under Fight Exclusive Night on October 20, 2018, against Łukasz Radosz. Kubiszyn lost the fight via a Unanimous Decision.

=== Wirtuoz Challenge ===
Kubiszyn made his debut under local federation Wirtuoz Challenge on April 6, 2019, against Tomasz Konieczny. Kubiszyn won the fight via a Unanimous Decision.

=== Halny Fighting Organization ===
Kubiszyn made his debut under Halny Fighting Organization on September 20, 2019, against Bartłomiej Domalik. The fight ended in a Unanimous Draw.

=== High League ===
After a four-year hiatus, Kubiszyn returned on March 18, 2023, against Dawid Załęcki. Kubiszyn won the fight via a Unanimous Decision.

=== Fame MMA ===
Kubiszyn made his debut under Fame MMA on October 4, 2024, against Michał Pasternak. Kubiszyn lost the fight via a Split Decision.

== Professional boxing record ==
Kubiszyn made his professional boxing debut on September 15, 2018, against Paweł Kochański. Kubiszyn won the fight via a Points Decision.

His next fight came on March 23, 2019, against Mariusz Nowak. Kubiszyn won the fight via a second-round corner retirement.

His next fight came on May 11, 2019, against Roman Fress. Kubiszyn lost the fight via a Unanimous Decision.

His next fight came on August 3, 2019, against Damien Sullivan under the federation Top Rank. Kubiszyn won the fight via a first-round TKO.

His next fight came on November 2, 2019, against Ralfs Vilcans. Kubiszyn lost the fight via a Split Decision.

His next fight came on January 28, 2020, against Salar Gholami. Kubiszyn lost the fight via a Unanimous Decision.

His final fight came on July 25, 2020, against Adam Balski. Kubiszyn lost the fight via a Unanimous Decision.

== Mixed martial arts career ==
Kubiszyn made his MMA debut on June 20, 2022, against Denis Załęcki. Kubiszyn won the fight via a Unanimous Decision.

His next fight came on December 10, 2022, against Damian Janikowski. Kubiszyn lost the fight via a Unanimous Decision.

== Bare-knuckle boxing career ==
Kubiszyn made his bare-knuckle boxing debut on August 28, 2020, where he competed in the second Gromda tournament. In the first round, he faced Artur Tomala. Kubiszyn won the fight via a second-round knockout. In the semifinals, he faced Rafał Łazarek. Kubiszyn won the fight via a fifth-round retirement. In the final, he faced Dawid Żółtaszek. Kubiszyn won the fight via a second-round TKO due to a doctor stoppage, winning the tournament in the process.

He faced Krystian Kuźma, who won the first tournament during the inaugural event in a Grand Final, in which he competed as the champion of the aforementioned tournament on December 11, 2020. Kubiszyn won the fight via a third-round knockout, once again winning the same tournament.

His next fight came on May 7, 2021, against Paweł Strzelczyk. The bout was originally ruled a no contest following an illegal blow. This was later changed to a TKO victory for Kubiszyn.

His next fight came on September 2, 2022, against Vasyl Halych. Kubiszyn won the fight via a fifth-round corner retirement. This performance earned him his first Fight of the Night bonus.

=== Gromda Champion ===
Kubiszyn faced Bartłomiej Domalik for the Gromda Championship on May 26, 2023. The two previously met four years prior in a kickboxing bout. Kubiszyn won the fight via fifth-round corner retirement, winning his first bare-knuckle boxing championship in the process.

His first title defense came on December 1, 2023, against Łukasz Parobiec. Kubiszyn won the fight via a second-round corner retirement, successfully defending his title.

His second title defense came on May 31, 2024, in a rematch against Bartłomiej Domalik. Kubiszyn won the fight via a fourth-round knockout.

His third title defense came on March 7, 2025, against Jakub Słomka. Kubiszyn won the fight via a fifth-round corner retirement.

== Championships and accomplishments ==
=== Kickboxing ===
- PZKB Light Heavyweight Championship (One time; former)

=== Bare-knuckle boxing ===
- Gromda Championship (One time; current)
  - Four successful title defenses
- Fight of the Night (One time)

== Mixed martial arts record ==
Professional record breakdown
2 matches	1 win	1 loss
By decision	1	1

Res.	Record	Opponent	Method	Event	Date	Round	Time	Location	Notes
Loss	1–1	Damian Janikowski	Decision (unanimous)	High League 5	December 10, 2022	3	5:00	Łódź, Poland	Catchweight (198 lb) bout.
Win	1–0	Denis Załęcki	Decision (unanimous)	High League 3	June 20, 2022	3	5:00	Warsaw, Poland	Heavyweight debut.

== Professional boxing record ==
7 fights	3 wins	4 losses
By knockout	2	0
By decision	1	4

No.	Result	Record	Opponent	Type	Round, time	Date	Location	Notes
7	Loss	3–4	Adam Balski	UD	6	25 Jul 2020	Amfiteatr Miejski, Augustów, Poland	
6	Loss	3–3	Salar Gholami	UD	4	28 Jan 2020	Danforth Music Hall, Toronto, Canada	
5	Loss	3–2	Ralfs Vilcans	SD	6	2 Nov 2019	Arena Riga, Riga, Latvia	
4	Win	3–1	Damien Sullivan	TKO	1 (4), 2:34	3 Aug 2019	Falls Park, Belfast, Northern Ireland	
3	Loss	2–1	Roman Fress	UD	6	11 May 2019	Stadthalle, Magdeburg, Germany	
2	Win	2–0	Mariusz Nowak	RTD	2 (4), 3:00	23 Mar 2019	Miejska Hala Sportowa, Świebodzin, Poland	
1	Win	1–0	Paweł Kochański	PTS	4	15 Sep 2018	Poznań, Poland	

== Bare-knuckle boxing record ==
Professional record breakdown
11 matches	11 wins	0 losses
By knockout	10	0
By decision	0	0
By disqualification	1	0

Res.	Record	Opponent	Method	Event	Date	Round	Time	Location	Notes
Win	11–0	Fifen Arami Gbeyi	DQ (illegal takedown and submission attempts)	Gromda 26: Polskie Koloseum	September 4, 2026	5	14:39	Pionki, Poland	Defended the Gromda Championship.
Win	10–0	Jakub Słomka	TKO (corner retirement)	Gromda 20: Stara Szkoła	March 7, 2025	5	11:37	Pionki, Poland	Defended the Gromda Championship.
Win	9–0	Bartłomiej Domalik	KO (punches)	Gromda 17: Vabank	May 31, 2024	4	1:56	Pionki, Poland	Defended the Gromda Championship.
Win	8–0	Łukasz Parobiec	TKO (corner retirement)	Gromda 15: Podziemny Krąg	December 1, 2023	2	0:22	Pionki, Poland	Defended the Gromda Championship.
Win	7–0	Bartłomiej Domalik	TKO (corner retirement)	Gromda 13: Don Diego vs. Balboa	May 26, 2023	5	1:10	Pionki, Poland	Won the Gromda Championship.
Win	6–0	Vasyl Halych	TKO (corner retirement)	Gromda 10: Don Diego vs. Vasyl	September 2, 2022	5	8:48	Pionki, Poland	Fight of the Night.
Win	5–0	Paweł Strzelczyk	TKO (punch)	Gromda 5	May 7, 2021	2	N/A	Pionki, Poland	Originally ruled a no contest; later overruled to Kubiszyn victory.
Win	4–0	Krystian Kuźma	KO (punch)	Gromda 3: Tyson vs. Don Diego	December 11, 2020	3	1:44	Pionki, Poland	Won the Gromda Grand Final.
Win	3–0	Dawid Żółtaszek	TKO (doctor stoppage)	Gromda 2	August 28, 2020	2	N/A	Warsaw, Poland	Won the Gromda Tournament #1.
Win	2–0	Rafał Łazarek	TKO (retirement)	Gromda 2	August 28, 2020	5	4:36	Warsaw, Poland	Gromda Tournament #1 Semifinal.
Win	1–0	Artur Tomala	KO (punch)	Gromda 2	August 28, 2020	2	N/A	Warsaw, Poland	Gromda Tournament #1 Quarterfinal.

== Kickboxing record ==
Professional kickboxing record
7 Wins (0 (T)KOs), 6 Losses, 1 Draw
Date	Result	Opponent	Event	Location	Method	Round	Time
2026-01-24	Loss	(Poland) Izuagbe Ugonoh	Fame 29: S-Class Tournament	Tarnów, Poland	Decision (unanimous)	3	3:00
Fame MMA S-Class Tournament.
2025-07-12	Loss	(Poland) Denis Labryga	Fame 26: Gold	Warsaw, Poland	Decision (technical)	1	10:02
2025-07-12	Win	(Poland) Tomasz Sarara	Fame 26: Gold	Warsaw, Poland	Decision (unanimous)	3	3:00
2025-07-12	Win	(Poland) Kamil Minda	Fame 26: Gold	Warsaw, Poland	Decision (unanimous)	3	3:00
Fame MMA Golden Tournament.
2024-10-04	Loss	(Poland) Michał Pasternak	Fame: The Freak	Szczecin, Poland	Decision (split)	3	3:00
2023-03-18	Win	(Poland) Dawid Załęcki	High League 6	Katowice, Poland	Decision (unanimous)	3	3:00
2019-09-20	Draw	(Poland) Bartłomiej Domalik	HFO Spartan Night	Jasło, Poland	Draw (unanimous)	4	3:00
2019-04-06	Win	(Poland) Tomasz Konieczny	Wirtuoz Challenge 2	Wolbórz, Poland	Decision (unanimous)	3	3:00
2018-10-20	Loss	(Poland) Łukasz Radosz	Fight Exclusive Night 22	Poznań, Poland	Decision (unanimous)	3	3:00
2018-06-16	Win	(Poland) Kacper Frątczak	Kickboxing Masters Fight Series	Mysiadło, Poland	Decision (split)	3	3:00
Wins the PZKB Light Heavyweight Championship.
2018-02-03	Loss	(Poland) Maksymilian Bratkowicz	DSF Kickboxing Challenge 13	Wrocław, Poland	Decision (unanimous)	5	3:00
For the DSF Light Heavyweight (86 kg) Championship.
2017-12-08	Loss	(Ukraine) Yurii Zubchuk	DSF – Międzynarodowy Mecz K-1 Polska vs. Ukraina	Rivne, Ukraine	Ext.R Decision	4	3:00
2017-09-29	Win	(Poland) Damian Pasiek	DSF Eliminator	Ząbki, Poland	Decision (unanimous)	3	3:00
2016-12-16	Win	(Poland) Maksymilian Bratkowicz	DSF Kickboxing Challenge	Warsaw, Poland	Decision (unanimous)	3	3:00
