= Ivan Bartek =

- Born: April 21, 1989 (age 37); Czechoslovakia
- Nationality: Slovak
- Height: 1.90 m (6 ft 3 in)
- Weight: 102 kg (225 lb; 16.1 st)
- Division: Heavyweight
- Style: Muay Thai
- Fighting out of: Slovakia
- Team: Cerberos Gym

Kickboxing record
- Total: 71
- Wins: 48
- By knockout: 18
- Losses: 20
- Draws: 3

Ivan Bartek (born April 21, 1989) is a Slovak professional Muay Thai and kickboxer, competing in the heavyweight division of K-1.

== Championships and accomplishments ==
=== Professional ===
- Professional Muaythai League
  - PML 95 kg World Championship
- Intercontinental champion WKU K1
- European Champion WKF Muay Thai

== Fight record ==
Kickboxing record
48 wins (18 KOs), 20 losses, 3 draws
| Date | Result | Opponent | Event | Location | Method | Round | Time |
| 2025-11-21 | Win | (Serbia) Željko Zec | Cerberos Fight Night 14 | Slovakia | Decision | 3 | |
| 2025-04-06 | Loss | (Italy) Enrico Pellegrino | Thai Fight : Rome | Rome, Italy | TKO | 3 | |
| 2024-06-29 | Loss | (Bosnia and Herzegovina) Danilo Tošić | K-1 World GP 2024 in Sarajevo, Tournament Quarter-final | Sarajevo, Bosnia and Herzegovina | Decision | 3 | 3:00 |
| 2024-04-13 | Win | (Morocco) Abdelilah Azzouzi | PML 9 | Slovakia | Decision | 3 | 3:00 |
| 2023-11-24 | Win | (United Kingdom) Yashua Sam | Cerberos Fight Night 12 | Bratislava, Slovakia | Decision | 3 | 3:00 |
| 2023-10-28 | Win | (Morocco) Chahid Chaquibi | KOK 116' | Slovakia | Decision | 3 | 3:00 |
| 2023-04-21 | Win | (Netherlands) Fabio Kwasi | Cerberos Fight Night 11 | Bratislava, Slovakia | Decision | 3 | 3:00 |
| 2023-02-18 | Loss | (Canada) Olivier Langlois-Ross | Senshi 15 | Varna, Bulgaria | Decision | 3 | 3:00 |
| 2022-11-25 | Win | (Greece) Pavlos Kochliaridis | Cerberos Fight Night 10 | Bratislava, Slovakia | Decision | 3 | 3:00 |
| 2022-10-29 | Loss | (Czech Republic) Tomáš Hron | RFA 5 | Brno, Czech Republic | Decision | 3 | 3:00 |
| 2022-06-11 | Win | (Czech Republic) Melvin Mané | PML 3 : 95 kg Tournament Final | Czech Republic | Decision | 5 | 3:00 |
Wins the PML (-95kg) World Championships.
| 2022-01-29 | Win | (Czech Republic) Adam Audy | PML 1 : 95 kg Tournament Semi-final | Czech Republic | Decision (split) | 3 | 3:00 |
| 2021-05-08 | Loss | (Poland) Mateusz Duczmal | A1 Federation 6 | Poland | Decision | 5 | 3:00 |
| 2019-11-09 | Win | (France) Pascal Touré | KOK 79' | Slovakia | Decision | 3 | 3:00 |
| 2019-03-30 | Loss | (Poland) Michał Turyński | DSF 21 | Poland | KO | | |
| 2018-12-15 | Loss | (Poland) Marcin Bodnar | MFC15 | Poland | Decision | | 3:00 |
| 2018-10-27 | Win | (Germany) Ahmed Karouaoui | Cerberos Fight Night 6 | Bratislava, Slovakia | TKO | 1 | |
| 2018-03-16 | Win | (Czech Republic) Petr Vondráček | Simply the Best 18 | Slovakia | Decision | 3 | 3:00 |
| 2018-02-03 | Win | (Belgium) Madani Rahmani | INVICTUS FIGHT SHOW 3 | Belgium | TKO | 1 | |
| 2017-11-11 | Win | (Bosnia and Herzegovina) Dzenan Poturak | W5 "EUROPEAN LEAGUE" | Košice, Slovakia | TKO | 1 | |
| 2017-10-07 | Win | (Austria) Dritan Barjamaj | Cerberos Fight Night 4 | Slovakia | KO | 1 | |
| 2017-06-17 | Loss | (Romania) Andrei Stoica | Colosseum Tournament 2 | Ploiești, Romania | Decision (unanimous) | 3 | 3:00 |
| 2017-05-06 | Win | (Czech Republic) Cyril Pohl | Enfusion Live | Slovakia | Decision | 3 | 3:00 |
| 2017-04-22 | Win | (Belarus) Ihar Kamkov | Cerberos Fight Night 3 | Bratislava, Slovakia | TKO | 1 | |
| 2016-11-11 | Loss | (Czech Republic) Vasil Ducár | Fusion EN 9 | Czech Republic | Decision (majority) | 3 | 3:00 |
| 2016-10-15 | Win | (Croatia) Marko Martinjak | Cerberos Fight Night 2 | Bratislava, Slovakia | KO | 1 | |
| 2016-04-16 | Win | (Hungary) Péter Rozmaring | Cerberos Fight Night | Bratislava, Slovakia | KO (knees) | 1 | |
| 2016-03-19 | Loss | (Poland) Tomasz Sarara | FEN 11 | Warsaw, Poland | Decision | 3 | 3:00 |
| 2016-01-23 | Loss | (China) Yang Yu | Kunlun Fight 37 | Sanya, China | Decision | 3 | 3:00 |
| 2015-10-17 | Win | (Slovakia) Miroslav Stverak | Youngblood 43 | Bratislava, Slovakia | Decision | | |
| 2014-11-29 | Loss | (Ukraine) Oleg Pryimachov | W5 FIGHTER "CROSSROAD OF TIMES" | Bratislava, Slovakia | Decision | 3 | 3:00 |
| 2014-10-18 | Win | (Poland) Michał Grzesiak | Youngblood 35 | Bratislava, Slovakia | Decision | | |
| 2014 | Loss | (Czech Republic) David Vinš | Night of Warriors 5 | | Decision | 3 | 3:00 |
| 2014-06-21 | Loss | (Russia) Mikhail Tyuterev | W5 FIGHTER "OPEN AIR" | | Decision | 3 | 3:00 |
| 2014-04-27 | Loss | (France) Massinissa Hamaili | Kunlun Fight 4 : 95 kg Tournament Final | Manila, Philippines | TKO | 2 | |
| 2014-04-27 | Win | (China) Yin Pengsen | Kunlun Fight 4 : 95 kg Tournament Semifinals | Manila, Philippines | KO (knees) | 2 | |
| 2013-06-01 | Win | (Czech Republic) Václav Pejsar | Profiliga Muay Thai 13 | Slovakia | Decision | | |
| 2012-10-06 | Win | (Czech Republic) Michal Reissinger | Noc Bojov 3 Muay Thai | Slovakia | Decision | | |
| 2012-04-28 | Loss | (France) Zinedine Hameur-Lain | Tatneft Cup | Kazan, Russia | TKO | 1 | |
| 2012-04-14 | Win | (Belarus) Aleksandr Kodis | Youngblood 13 | Bratislava, Slovakia | KO | 1 | |
| 2012 | Win | (Hungary) Máté Zentai | | | KO | | |
| 2012 | Win | (Czech Republic) Petr Holubec | | | KO | 1 | |
| 2011-08-27 | Win | (Hungary) Július Csorba | Youngblood 9 | | KO | 1 | |
| 2011 | Win | (Slovakia) Adrian Bartl | Muay Thai Zelena Voda 2011 | | Decision | | |
Legend: Win Loss Draw/no contest Notes

== See also ==
- List of male kickboxers
