= 2024 in Ultimate Warrior Challenge Mexico =

Information
- First date: February 25, 2024
- Last date: July 28, 2024

Events
- Total events: 4

Fights
- Total fights: 35
- Title fights: 4

The year 2024 was the 13th year in the history of Ultimate Warrior Challenge Mexico, a mixed martial arts promotion based in Mexico. In these year, UWC held 4 event.

== Events list ==
#	Event	Date	Venue	Location
1	UWC Mexico 51: García vs. Luna	February 25, 2024	Entram Gym	Tijuana, Mexico
2	UWC Mexico 52: Ramos vs. Sedano	April 7, 2024	Zonkeys Arena	Tijuana, Mexico
3	UWC Mexico 53: Elías vs. Meza	May 19, 2024	Entram Gym	Tijuana, Mexico
4	UWC Mexico 54: Gordillo vs. López	July 28, 2024	Entram Gym	Tijuana, Mexico

== UWC Mexico 51: García vs. Luna ==
UWC Mexico 51: García vs. Luna
- Promotion: Ultimate Warrior Challenge Mexico
- Date: February 25, 2024
- Venue: Entram Gym
- City: Tijuana, Mexico

Event chronology
UWC Mexico 50: González vs. García	UWC Mexico 51: García vs. Luna	UWC Mexico 52: Ramos vs. Sedano

UWC Mexico 51: García vs. Luna was a mixed martial arts event held by Ultimate Warrior Challenge Mexico on February 25, 2024, at the Entram Gym in Tijuana, Mexico.

=== Background ===
A fight for the UWC Bantamweight Championship between champion Adrián Luna Martinetti and Mahatma García headlined event.

The co-main event was a UWC Welterweight Championship fight between champion Adrián Oviedo and Carlos Camargo.

=== Results ===
Main card
Weight class				Method	Round	Time	Notes
Bantamweight	Adrián Luna Martinetti	def.	Mahatma García	Submission (rear-naked choke)	3	4:35	(Note: For the UWC Bantamweight Championship)
Welterweight	Adrián Oviedo	def.	Carlos Camargo	TKO (shoulder injury)	4	5:00	(Note: For the UWC Welterweight Championship)
Lightweight	Eduardo Vásquez	def.	Andrés Torres	Decision (unanimous)	3	5:00
Flyweight	Luis Elías	def.	Francisco Ramírez	KO (body kick)	1	1:54
Welterweight	Silvestre Sánchez	def.	Emmanuel González	Submission (rear-naked choke)	3	2:28
Bantamweight	Edwin Martínez	def.	Juan Rebolledo	Submission (rear-naked choke)	1	1:48

== UWC Mexico 52: Ramos vs. Sedano ==
UWC Mexico 52: Ramos vs. Sedano
- Promotion: Ultimate Warrior Challenge Mexico
- Date: April 7, 2024
- Venue: Zonkeys Arena
- City: Tijuana, Mexico

Event chronology
UWC Mexico 51: García vs. Luna	UWC Mexico 52: Ramos vs. Sedano	UWC Mexico 53: Elías vs. Meza

UWC Mexico 52: Ramos vs. Sedano was a mixed martial arts event held by Ultimate Warrior Challenge Mexico on April 7, 2024, at the Zonkeys Arena in Tijuana, Mexico.

=== Background ===
A fight for the UWC Featherweight Championship between champion Dorian Ramos and Esteban Sedano headlined event.

=== Results ===
Main card
Weight class				Method	Round	Time	Notes
Featherweight	Dorian Ramos	def.	Esteban Sedano	Decision (unanimous)	5	5:00	(Note: For the UWC Featherweight Championship)
Middleweight	Barry Hedgebeth	def.	Marco Pardo	Decision (unanimous)	3	5:00
Women's Strawweight	Karla Torres	def.	Odeth Realyvásquez	TKO (punches)	1	0:49
Flyweight	Alan Martínez	def.	Iván Hernández-Flores	TKO (head kick and punches)	3	0:26
Lightweight	Marco Antonio Elpidio	def.	Hugo Oyarzún	Decision (split)	3	5:00
Bantamweight	Santiago Luna	def.	Josimar Cuevas	TKO (punches)	3	1:17
Welterweight	Alexis Miranda	def.	Fausto Gómez	TKO (punch to the body and knee)	2	4:47
Lightweight	Salvador Hernández	def.	Martín Alvarado	KO (punch)	1	1:35

== UWC Mexico 53: Elías vs. Meza ==
UWC Mexico 53: Elías vs. Meza
- Promotion: Ultimate Warrior Challenge Mexico
- Date: May 19, 2024
- Venue: Entram Gym
- City: Tijuana, Mexico

Event chronology
UWC Mexico 52: Ramos vs. Sedano	UWC Mexico 53: Elías vs. Meza	UWC Mexico 54: Gordillo vs. López

UWC Mexico 53: Elías vs. Meza was a mixed martial arts event held by Ultimate Warrior Challenge Mexico on May 19, 2024, at the Entram Gym in Tijuana, Mexico.

=== Background ===
A flyweight fight between Luis Elías and Giovanni Meza headlined the event.

=== Results ===
Main card
Weight class				Method	Round	Time	Notes
Flyweight	Luis Elías	def.	Giovanny Meza	Submission (triangle choke)	1	2:58
Featherweight	Manuel Expósito	def.	Luis Duván Rincón	Decision (Unanimous)	3	5:00
Featherweight	Pedro Peña	def.	Victor Nuñez	KO (flying knee)	1	1:13
Catchweight (140 lb)	Luis Carlos Bañuelos	def.	Eduardo García	Submission (rear-naked choke)	2	3:28
Catchweight (130 lb)	Kevin Rosas	def.	Daniel Cruz	Submission (rear-naked choke)	1	2:28
Women's Flyweight	Yazmin Nájera	def.	Yuliana Ivetth	TKO (punches)	1	3:30

== UWC Mexico 54: Gordillo vs. López ==
UWC Mexico 54: Gordillo vs. López
- Promotion: Ultimate Warrior Challenge Mexico
- Date: July 28, 2024
- Venue: Entram Gym
- City: Tijuana, Mexico

Event chronology
UWC Mexico 53: Elías vs. Meza	UWC Mexico 54: Gordillo vs. López	UWC Mexico 55: Martinez vs. Segura

UWC Mexico 54: Gordillo vs. López was a mixed martial arts event held by Ultimate Warrior Challenge Mexico on July 28, 2024, at the Entram Gym in Tijuana, Mexico.

=== Background ===
A fight for the UWC Middleweight Championship between former LUX middleweight champion Nayib López and Antonio Gordillo headlined event.

=== Results ===
Main card
Weight class				Method	Round	Time	Notes
Middleweight	Nayib López	def.	Antonio Gordillo	Decision (unanimous)	5	5:00	(Note: For the UWC Middleweight Championship)
Flyweight	Jorge López Pérez	def.	Dylan Romero	TKO (punches)	1	2:15
Bantamweight	Johnny Muñoz Jr.	def.	Juan Pablo Mendoza	Decision (unanimous)	3	5:00
Lightweight	Cesar Abad	def.	Mario Martínez	TKO (leg kick and punches)	1	2:11
Flyweight	Gabriel Urbino	def.	Alexis Coatzin	Decision (unanimous)	3	5:00
Lightweight	Salvador Hernández	def.	Héctor Martínez	Submission (rear-naked choke)	1	3:25
Featherweight	Tahel Sotelo	def.	David Mariscal Jr.	TKO (head kick and punches)	1	4:29
Bantamweight	Gael González	def.	Adrian Pap Valdieso	Decision (unanimous)	3	5:00
Catchweight (110 lb)	Azul Essenwagner	def.	Samantha Aispuro	Decision (unanimous)	3	5:00
Bantamweight	Ramon Mosqueda	def.	Juan Pablo Jiménez Cundapi	Decision (unanimous)	3	5:00
Lightweight	Ángel Ruíz	def.	Dayan Pantoja	TKO	2	1:43
Welterweight	Juryoel Cordero	def.	Miguel Angel Quintana
Strawweight	Diego Orozco	def.	Felipe Mora	Submission (arm-triangle choke)	1	1:40
Catchweight (130 lb)	Ángel Verdin Escobar	def.	Jose Castañeda	Decision (unanimous)	3	5:00
Featherweight	Julio Ruelas	def.	Jorge Velázquez	KO	1	0:13
