= 2021 in Ultimate Warrior Challenge Mexico =

Information
- First date: February 26, 2021
- Last date: November 26, 2021

Events
- Total events: 6

Fights
- Total fights: 59
- Title fights: 5

The year 2021 was the 10th year in the history of Ultimate Warrior Challenge Mexico, a mixed martial arts promotion based in Mexico. In these year, UWC held 6 event.

== Events list ==
#	Event	Date	Venue	Location
1	UWC Mexico 25: Quinóñez vs. Matos	February 26, 2021	Entram Gym	Tijuana, Mexico
2	UWC Mexico 26: Verdugo vs. Barahona	April 30, 2021	Entram Gym	Tijuana, Mexico
3	UWC Mexico 27: Torres vs. Cañada	June 11, 2021	Entram Gym	Tijuana, Mexico
4	UWC Mexico 28: Luna vs. Benítez	August 13, 2021	Entram Gym	Tijuana, Mexico
5	UWC Mexico 29: Meráz vs. Rivero	October 1, 2021	Entram Gym	Tijuana, Mexico
6	UWC Mexico 30: Leyva vs. Galera	November 26, 2021	Entram Gym	Tijuana, Mexico

== UWC Mexico 25: Quinóñez vs. Matos ==
UWC Mexico 25: Quinóñez vs. Matos
- Promotion: Ultimate Warrior Challenge Mexico
- Date: February 26, 2021
- Venue: Entram Gym
- City: Tijuana, Mexico

Event chronology
UWC Mexico 24: Friday the 13th	UWC Mexico 25: Quinóñez vs. Matos	UWC Mexico 26: Verdugo vs. Barahona

UWC Mexico 25: Quinóñez vs. Matos was a mixed martial arts event held by Ultimate Warrior Challenge Mexico on February 26, 2021, at the Entram Gym in Tijuana, Mexico.

=== Background ===
A fight for the UWC Lightweight Championship between champion Cristian Quiñónez and Adonilton Matos headlined event.

The co-main event featured a light heavyweight bout between Jesús Navarrete and Víctor de Paula.

=== Results ===
Main card
Weight class				Method	Round	Time	Notes
Bantamweight	Cristian Quiñónez	def.	Adonilton Matos	Decision (unanimous)	5	5:00	(Note: For the UWC Lightweight Championship)
Light Heavyweight	Jesús Navarrete	def.	Víctor de Paula	Submission (rear-naked choke)	1	1:30
Flyweight	Silvana Gómez Juárez	def.	Gilsely Perrea	TKO (punches)	2	3:53
Flyweight	Sóslenis Carvalho	def.	Gabriel Valdez	TKO (punches)	1	1:44
Catchweight	Alfonso Leyva	def.	Fernando Oliva	TKO (punches)	2	4:20
Flyweight	Mark Climaco	def.	Rafael Nuñes	TKO (punches)	1	2:31
Welterweight	Shane Keefe	def.	Mauricio Sosa	KO (head kick)	1	1:08
Welterweight	Fabrizio Escarrega	def.	Carlos Camargo	Decision (unanimous)	3	5:00
Welterweight	Mohammad Alaqraa	def.	Rodrigo Reyes	TKO (punches)	2	2:22
Featherweight	Carlos Castañeda	def.	Fredy Villegas	TKO (punches)	1	4:07
Bantamweight	Juan Ramírez	def.	Juan Rebolledo	Submission (rear-naked choke)	1	1:39
Featherweight	Nick Palea	def.	Ramón Vizcarra	TKO (doctor stoppage)	2	5:00
Bantamweight	Alan Martínez	def.	Alex Navarro	Submission (keylock)	1	4:05
Catchweight	Liam Hill	def.	Gerardo García Pérez	Submission (armbar)	1	2:38

== UWC Mexico 26: Verdugo vs. Barahona ==
UWC Mexico 26: Verdugo vs. Barahona
- Promotion: Ultimate Warrior Challenge Mexico
- Date: April 30, 2021
- Venue: Entram Gym
- City: Tijuana, Mexico

Event chronology
UWC Mexico 25: Quinóñez vs. Matos	UWC Mexico 26: Verdugo vs. Barahona	UWC Mexico 27: Torres vs. Cañada

UWC Mexico 26: Verdugo vs. Barahona was a mixed martial arts event held by Ultimate Warrior Challenge Mexico on April 30, 2021, at the Entram Gym in Tijuana, Mexico.

=== Background ===
A fight for the UWC Bantamweight Championship between champion José Luis Verdugo and Alexander Barahona headlined event.

The co-main event was a UWC Welterweight Championship fight between Iván Castillo and Leonardo Blasco.

=== Results ===
Main card
Weight class				Method	Round	Time	Notes
Lightweight	José Luis Verdugo	def.	Alexander Barahona	Submission (rear-naked choke)	2	3:41	(Note: For the UWC Bantamweight Championship)
Welterweight	Iván Castillo	def.	Leonardo Blasco	TKO (punches)	4	4:40	(Note: For the UWC Welterweight Championship)
Welterweight	Michael Morales	def.	Miguel Arizmendi	TKO (punches)	2	4:02
Catchweight (140 lb)	Braían González	def.	Gilberto Santos	Decision (unanimous)	3	5:00
Flyweight	Sóslenis Carvalho	def.	Iván Rocka	TKO (punches)	1	2:22
Lightweight	Jair Pérez	def.	Rodolfo Reseck	Decision (unanimous)	3	5:00
Featherweight	Alejandro Gavidia	def.	Raúl Méndez	Submission (rear-naked choke)	2	0:54
Flyweight	Alan Martínez	def.	Bryan Martínez	Submission (rear-naked choke)	1	3:00
Lightweight	Cesar Abad	def.	Troy Sanders	Submission (rear-naked choke)	2	1:02
Featherweight	Brandon Alcaráz	def.	Nick Palea	TKO (leg injury)	1	3:27
Featherweight	José Juan Acuña	def.	Gabriel Martínez	TKO (leg kicks)	3	1:37

== UWC Mexico 27: Torres vs. Cañada ==
UWC Mexico 27: Torres vs. Cañada
- Promotion: Ultimate Warrior Challenge Mexico
- Date: June 11, 2021
- Venue: Entram Gym
- City: Tijuana, Mexico

Event chronology
UWC Mexico 26: Verdugo vs. Barahona	UWC Mexico 27: Torres vs. Cañada	UWC Mexico 28: Luna vs. Benítez

UWC Mexico 27: Torres vs. Cañada was a mixed martial arts event held by Ultimate Warrior Challenge Mexico on June 11, 2021, at the Entram Gym in Tijuana, Mexico.

=== Background ===
A lightweight bout between Manuel "Loco" Torres and Carlos Cañada headlined the event.

The co-main event featured newcomers Aarón Cañarte and Alexander Barahona, also in lightweight division.

=== Results ===
Main card
Weight class				Method	Round	Time	Notes
Lightweight	Manuel Torres	def.	Carlos Cañada	Submission (guillotine choke)	1	0:25
Lightweight	Aarón Cañarte	def.	Alexander Barahona	Decision (unanimous)	3	5:00
Bantamweight	Braían González	def.	Paul Márquez	TKO (retirement)	2	5:00
Featherweight	Guillherme Antunes	def.	Patrick Faeh	TKO (punches)	2	2:23
Featherweight	Santiago Prieto	def.	Manuel Reyna	TKO (punches)	2	4:25
Welterweight	David Enriquez	def.	René Hernández	TKO (punches)	2	3:20

== UWC Mexico 28: Luna vs. Benítez ==
UWC Mexico 28: Luna vs. Benítez
- Promotion: Ultimate Warrior Challenge Mexico
- Date: August 13, 2021
- Venue: Entram Gym
- City: Tijuana, Mexico

Event chronology
UWC Mexico 27: Torres vs. Cañada	UWC Mexico 28: Luna vs. Benítez	UWC Mexico 29: Meráz vs. Rivero

UWC Mexico 28: Luna vs. Benítez was a mixed martial arts event held by Ultimate Warrior Challenge Mexico on August 13, 2021, at the Entram Gym in Tijuana, Mexico.

=== Background ===
A flyweight bout between newcomers Andrés Luna Martinetti and Francisco Benítez headlined the event.

The co-main event featured another flyweight fight, although this one was in the women's division: Jennifer Gonzalez versus Adriana Lugo.

=== Results ===
Main card
Weight class				Method	Round	Time	Notes
Flyweight	Andrés Luna Martinetti	def.	Francisco Benítez	TKO (punches)	1	4:17
Flyweight	Jennifer González	def.	Adriana Lugo	Submission (armbar)	1	1:02
Lightweight	James Llontop	def.	Elías Mendez	Decision (unanimous)	3	5:00
Catchweight (130lb)	Brandon Uruchurtu	def.	Braían González	KO (flying knee)	1	4:18
Bantamweight	Juan Díaz	def.	Juan Campos	TKO (punches)	1	3:21
Flyweight	Cesar Vázquez Jr.	def.	Hugo Torres	KO (punches)	0	0:00
Featherweight	Esteban Sedano	def.	Luis Escudero	TKO (punches)	2	4:39
Light Heavyweight	Sergio Fontanellas	def.	Luis Guzmán	Decision (unanimous)	3	5:00
Catchweight (120lb)	Jazmín Navarrete	def.	Damara Vargas	Decision (unanimous)	3	5:00

== UWC Mexico 29: Meráz vs. Rivero ==
UWC Mexico 29: Meráz vs. Rivero
- Promotion: Ultimate Warrior Challenge Mexico
- Date: October 1, 2021
- Venue: Entram Gym
- City: Tijuana, Mexico

Event chronology
UWC Mexico 28: Luna vs. Benítez	UWC Mexico 29: Meráz vs. Rivero	UWC Mexico 30: Leyva vs. Galera

UWC Mexico 29: Meráz vs. Rivero was a mixed martial arts event held by Ultimate Warrior Challenge Mexico on October 1, 2021, at the Entram Gym in Tijuana, Mexico.

=== Background ===
A fight for the UWC Featherweight Championship between champion Luis Meráz and Emmanuel Rivero headlined event.

The co-main event was a UWC Flyweight Championship fight between Sóslenis Carvalho and Paulino Siller.

=== Results ===
Main card
Weight class				Method	Round	Time	Notes
Featherweight	Emmanuel Rivero	def.	Luis Meráz	TKO (punches)	1	0:47	(Note: For the UWC Featherweight Championship)
Flyweight	Sóslenis Carvalho	def.	Paulino Siller	Submission (arm-triangle choke)	2	4:19	(Note: For the UWC Flyweight Championship)
Catchweight (165 lb)	Leonardo Blasco	def.	Enrique Granados Farrea	TKO (punches)	1	4:51
Bantamweight	Adrián Luna Martinetti	def.	Oscar García	Decision (unanimous)	3	5:00
Catchweight (180 lb)	Alfonso Leyva	def.	Hiram Furukawa	TKO (punches)	2	1:54
Flyweight	José Ochoa	vs.	Jhoao Ruíz	No Contest (illegal knee)	1	2:38
Flyweight	Alan Martínez	def.	Miguel Ramírez	TKO (punches)	1	2:38
Bantamweight	Cristhian Rivas	def.	Cesar Bañuelos	Decision (unanimous)	3	5:00
Lightweight	Cesar Abad	def.	Mauricio Sosa	Decision (unanimous)	3	5:00

== UWC Mexico 30: Leyva vs. Galera ==
UWC Mexico 30: Leyva vs. Galera
- Promotion: Ultimate Warrior Challenge Mexico
- Date: November 26, 2021
- Venue: Entram Gym
- City: Tijuana, Mexico

Event chronology
UWC Mexico 29: Meráz vs. Rivero	UWC Mexico 30: Leyva vs. Galera	UWC Mexico 31: Luna vs. Uruchurtu

UWC Mexico 30: Leyva vs. Galera was a mixed martial arts event held by Ultimate Warrior Challenge Mexico on November 26, 2021, at the Entram Gym in Tijuana, Mexico.

=== Background ===
A flyweight bout between Olympic medalist undefeated Alfonso Leyva and Francisco Benítez headlined the event.

=== Results ===
Main card
Weight class				Method	Round	Time	Notes
Catchweight (175 lb)	Alfonso Leyva	def.	Alberto Galera	TKO (punches)	2	4:19
Bantamweight	Andrés Luna Martinetti	def.	Paul Márquez	Submission (calf slicer)	2	4:14
Welterweight	Leonardo Blasco	def.	Walter Luna	Submission (rear-naked choke)	3	0:48
Lightweight	Javier Basurto	def.	Christopher Ramírez	TKO (body kick and punches)	2	1:08
Featherweight	Aaron Cañarte	def.	Fernando Arevalo	Decision (unanimous)	3	5:00
Lightweight	Hugo Oyarzún	def.	Troy Sanders	Decision (unanimous)	3	5:00
Women's Flyweight	Fernanda Muñoz	def.	Joselin Fuller	TKO	0	0:00
Welterweight	Freddy May	def.	Rafael Bravo Beltrán	Submission (rear-naked choke)	1	3:14
Featherweight	Raul Rosas Jr.	def.	Eduardo Velázquez	Submission (rear-naked choke)	1	1:01
Bantamweight	Joshua Fernández	def.	Fernando Vázquez	TKO	2	2:38
