= Santiago Luna (fighter) =

Mexican mixed martial artist (born 2004)

- Born: Santiago Luna Valezco; August 6, 2004 (age 22); San Diego, California, U.S.
- Other names: Border Boy
- Height: 5 ft 8 in (1.73 m)
- Weight: 61 kg (134 lb; 9 st 8 lb)
- Division: Bantamweight
- Reach: 74 in (188 cm)
- Fighting out of: Tijuana, Baja California, Mexico
- Team: Entram Gym
- Years active: 2023–present

Mixed martial arts record
- Total: 10
- Wins: 9
- By knockout: 3
- By submission: 4
- By decision: 2
- Losses: 1
- By submission: 1

Other information
- Mixed martial arts record from Sherdog

Santiago Luna Velazco (born 6 August 2004) is an American-born Mexican professional mixed martial artist who currently competes in the Bantamweight division of the Ultimate Fighting Championship (UFC).

== Early life ==
Luna was born in San Diego, California, and raised in Tijuana, Baja California, Mexico. Before embarking on MMA, he had a career in Greco-Roman wrestling, where he was a three-time national champion and qualified for the Pan American Games. He began training at Entram Gym.

== Mixed martial arts career ==
=== Ultimate Warrior Challenge Mexico ===
Luna made his professional debut for the Ultimate Warrior Challenge Mexico on April 28, 2023, at UWC Mexico 43, where he secured a victory over Einar González with a rear-naked choke in the first round.

Later that same year, he won his next two fights against Luis Gerardo Aguillón at UWC Mexico 46, and then against Emilio Galindo at UWC Mexico 49 on October 27; in both, he applied the same submission hold.

On April 7, 2024, Luna faced Josimar Cuevas at UWC Mexico 52. He won the fight by technical knockout in the first round.

=== Ultimate Fighting Championship ===
With a 6–0 record and a 100% finish rate, Luna made his Ultimate Fighting Championship (UFC) debut, replacing fellow countryman David Martínez as Quang Le's opponent for UFC Fight Night 259. Luna won the fight via first-round knockout. His performance in the octagon earned him his first Performance of the Night bonus.

Luna faced Angel Pacheco on February 28, 2026, at UFC Fight Night 268. He won the fight by unanimous decision.

Replacing Victor Henry, Luna faced Bryce Mitchell on June 6, 2026, at UFC Fight Night 278. He lost the fight via an arm-triangle submission in the third round.

Luna faced Aleksandre Topuria on November 21, 2026, at UFC Fight Night 294. He won the fight by split decision. 8 out of 8 media outlets scored the bout for Luna.

== Championships and accomplishments ==
- Ultimate Fighting Championship
  - Performance of the Night (One time) vs. Quang Le

== Mixed martial arts record ==
Professional record breakdown
10 matches	9 wins	1 loss
By knockout	3	0
By submission	4	1
By decision	2	0

Res.	Record	Opponent	Method	Event	Date	Round	Time	Location	Notes
Win	9–1	Aleksandre Topuria	Decision (split)	UFC Fight Night: Procházka vs. Stirling	November 21, 2026	3	5:00	Al Rayyan, Qatar	
Loss	8–1	Bryce Mitchell	Submission (arm-triangle choke)	UFC Fight Night: Muhammad vs. Bonfim	June 6, 2026	3	4:52	Las Vegas, Nevada, United States	
Win	8–0	Angel Pacheco	Decision (unanimous)	UFC Fight Night: Moreno vs. Kavanagh	February 28, 2026	3	5:00	Mexico City, Mexico	
Win	7–0	Quang Le	KO (punch)	UFC Fight Night: Lopes vs. Silva	September 13, 2025	1	2:48	San Antonio, Texas, United States	Return to Bantamweight. Performance of the Night.
Win	6–0	Desmond Manabat	KO (punch)	Tuff-N-Uff 144	May 22, 2025	1	2:45	San Diego, California, United States	Featherweight debut.
Win	5–0	Magomed Bayduev	Submission (rear-naked choke)	Lights Out Xtreme Fighting 19	September 6, 2024	3	4:41	Long Beach, California, United States	Catchweight (140 lb) bout.
Win	4–0	Josimar Cuevas	TKO (punches)	UWC Mexico 52	April 7, 2024	1	3:17	Tijuana, Mexico	
Win	3–0	Emilio Galindo	Submission (rear-naked choke)	UWC Mexico 49	October 27, 2023	1	2:43	Tijuana, Mexico	
Win	2–0	Luis Gerardo Aguillón	Submission (rear-naked choke)	UWC Mexico 46	July 23, 2023	2	4:34	Tijuana, Mexico	Bantamweight debut.
Win	1–0	Einar González	Submission (rear-naked choke)	UWC Mexico 43	April 28, 2023	1	2:56	Tijuana, Mexico	Catchweight (138 lb) bout.

== See also ==
- List of current UFC fighters
- List of male mixed martial artists
- List of Mexican UFC fighters
