= 2012 in Ultimate Warrior Challenge Mexico =

Information
- First date: January 29, 2012
- Last date: March 24, 2012

Events
- Total events: 2

Fights
- Total fights: 15
- Title fights: 1

The year 2012 was the four year in the history of Ultimate Warrior Challenge Mexico, a mixed martial arts promotion based in Mexico. In these year, UWC held 2 events.

== Events list ==
#	Event	Date	Venue	Location
1	UWC Mexico: New Blood 1	January 29, 2012	Score Sports Bar	Tijuana, Mexico
2	UWC Mexico 12: Never Tap	March 24, 2012	Auditorio Fausto Gutiérrez Moreno	Tijuana, Mexico

== UWC Mexico: New Blood 1 ==
UWC Mexico: New Blood 1
- Promotion: Ultimate Warrior Challenge Mexico
- Date: January 29, 2012
- Venue: Score Sports Bar
- City: Tijuana, Mexico

Event chronology
UWC Mexico 11: Born Again	UWC Mexico: New Blood 1	UWC Mexico 12: Never Tap

UWC Mexico: New Blood 1 was a mixed martial arts event held by Ultimate Warrior Challenge Mexico on January 29, 2012, at the Score Sports Bar in Tijuana, Mexico.

=== Background ===
A bantamweight fight between Antonio Barajas and Kevin Amador headlined the event.

=== Results ===
Main card
Weight class				Method	Round	Time	Notes
Bantamweight	Antonio Barajas	def.	Kevin Amador	Submission (punches and elbows)	1	3:43
Welterweight	Rogelio Melgoza	def.	Duque Dupree	TKO (punches)	1	4:08
Bantamweight	Gilbert Ramírez	def.	Chris Sandt	Submission (triangle choke)	1	1:02
Welterweight	Alexander Lucas	def.	Roberto Rodríguez	Submission (guillotine choke)	1	3:40
Welterweight	Iván Castillo	def.	Dominique Chisem	KO (punch)	1	2:24
Bantamweight	Brandon Moreno	def.	Luis García	Submission (armbar)	1	2:21
Welterweight	Iván Brognara	def.	Kenneth Witwicky	TKO (punches)	1	0:12

== UWC Mexico 12: Never Tap ==
UWC Mexico 12: Never Tap
- Promotion: Ultimate Warrior Challenge Mexico
- Date: March 24, 2012
- Venue: Auditorio Fausto Gutiérrez Moreno
- City: Tijuana, Mexico

Event chronology
UWC Mexico: New Blood 1	UWC Mexico 12: Never Tap	UWC México: Benítez vs. Oropeza

UWC Mexico 12: Never Tap was a mixed martial arts event held by Ultimate Warrior Challenge Mexico on March 24, 2012, at the Auditorio Fausto Gutiérrez Moreno in Tijuana, Mexico.

=== Background ===
The main event featured a UWC Lightweight Championship fight between Gary Padilla and David Mariscal.

=== Results ===
Main card
Weight class				Method	Round	Time	Notes
Lightweight	Gabriel Benítez (c)	def.	Jorge Alberto Bustamante	Submission (rear-naked choke)	2	3:12	(Note: For the UWC Lightweight Championship)
Bantamweight	Iván López	def.	Cristian Jiménez	Decision (split)	3	5:00
Featherweight	Henry Briones	def.	Manuel Ramos Gallareta	Decision (unanimous)	3	5:00
Bantamweight	Brady Harrison	def.	Ismael Leon	Decision (unanimous)	3	5:00
Welterweight	Fabián Quintanar	def.	Juan Voelker	Decision (split)	3	5:00
Lightweight	Miguel Enrique Torres	def.	Rogelio Melgoza	Submission (armbar)	3	2:08
Featherweight	Atiq Jihaid	def.	Masio Fullen	Decision (split)	3	5:00
Welterweight	Oscar Herrera	def.	Arafath Torres	Submission (guillotine choke)	1	2:14
