= 2022 in Ultimate Warrior Challenge Mexico =

Ultimate Warrior Challenge Mexico MMA events in 2022

Information
- First date: February 25, 2022
- Last date: November 25, 2022

Events
- Total events: 10

Fights
- Total fights: 82
- Title fights: 8

The year 2022 was the 11th year in the history of Ultimate Warrior Challenge Mexico, a mixed martial arts promotion based in Mexico. In these year, UWC held 10 event.

== Events list ==
#	Event	Date	Venue	Location
1	UWC Mexico 31: Luna vs. Uruchurtu	February 25, 2022	Entram Gym	Tijuana, Mexico
2	UWC Mexico 32: Sánchez vs. Valencia	March 25, 2022	Entram Gym	Tijuana, Mexico
3	UWC Mexico 33: Sabori vs. Rodríguez	April 29, 2022	El Foro	Tijuana, Mexico
4	UWC Mexico 34: Carvalho vs. Camilo	May 27, 2022	Entram Gym	Tijuana, Mexico
5	UWC Mexico 35: Luna vs. Campos	June 24, 2022	El Foro	Tijuana, Mexico
6	UWC Mexico 36: Díaz vs. García	July 29, 2022	Entram Gym	Tijuana, Mexico
7	UWC Mexico 37: Sánchez vs. Granados	August 26, 2022	Entram Gym	Tijuana, Mexico
8	UWC Mexico 38: Camilo vs. González	September 30, 2022	Entram Gym	Tijuana, Mexico
9	UWC Mexico 39: Meráz vs. Ramos	October 28, 2022	Entram Gym	Tijuana, Mexico
10	UWC Mexico 40: Sabori vs. Sánchez	November 25, 2022	Entram Gym	Tijuana, Mexico

== UWC Mexico 31: Luna vs. Uruchurtu ==
UWC Mexico 31: Luna vs. Uruchurtu
- Promotion: Ultimate Warrior Challenge Mexico
- Date: February 25, 2022
- Venue: Entram Gym
- City: Tijuana, Mexico

Event chronology
UWC Mexico 30: Leyva vs. Galera	UWC Mexico 31: Luna vs. Uruchurtu	UWC Mexico 32: Sánchez vs. Valencia

UWC Mexico 31: Luna vs. Uruchurtu was a mixed martial arts event held by Ultimate Warrior Challenge Mexico on February 25, 2022, at the Entram Gym in Tijuana, Mexico.

=== Background ===
A fight for the UWC Bantamweight Championship between champion Adrián Luna Martinetti and Brandon Uruchurtu headlined event.

The co-main event featured a lightweight fight between Pablo Sabori and Román Córdova, which was promoted as a Pelea de Gallos ("Cock Fight") because they share a nickname.

=== Results ===
Main card
Weight class				Method	Round	Time	Notes
Bantamweight	Adrián Luna Martinetti	def.	Brandon Uruchurtu	Submission (gogoplata)	2	1:33	(Note: For the UWC Bantamweight Championship)
Lightweight	Pablo Sabori	def.	Román Córdova	Submission (neck crank)	1	3:37
Catchweight (140 lb)	Rachid El Hazoume	def.	Francisco Benítez	Submission (armbar)	1	4:27
Flyweight	Alan Martínez	def.	Uriel Chávez	TKO (punches)	1	2:41
Welterweight	Adrián Oviedo	def.	Edgar Guardado	TKO (leg kick and punches)	2	0:12
Featherweight	Luis Escudero	def.	Manuel Reyna	Submission (rear-naked choke)	1	1:43

== UWC Mexico 32: Sánchez vs. Valencia ==
UWC Mexico 32: Sánchez vs. Valencia
- Promotion: Ultimate Warrior Challenge Mexico
- Date: March 25, 2022
- Venue: Entram Gym
- City: Tijuana, Mexico

Event chronology
UWC Mexico 31: Luna vs. Uruchurtu	UWC Mexico 32: Sánchez vs. Valencia	UWC Mexico 33: Sabori vs. Rodríguez

UWC Mexico 32: Sánchez vs. Valencia was a mixed martial arts event held by Ultimate Warrior Challenge Mexico on March 25, 2022, at the Entram Gym in Tijuana, Mexico.

=== Background ===
In this event, both the main and co-main events were announced as catchweight bouts due to one of the fighters exceeding the required weight on the scales. The main event featured Alejandro "Hulk" Sánchez and Stiven "Pantro" Valencia, while the co-main event pitted Cristhian Rivas against Juan Pablo Mendoza.

=== Results ===
Main card
Weight class				Method	Round	Time	Notes
Catchweight (160 lb)	Alejandro Sánchez	def.	Stiven Valencia	Decision (unanimous)	3	5:00
Catchweight (139 lb)	Cristhian Rivas	def.	Juan Pablo Mendoza	TKO (elbow and punches)	1	1:05
Bantamweight	Guillermo Torres	def.	Ricardo Ramírez	TKO (body kick and punches)	3	0:05
Women's Flyweight	Fernanda Muñoz	def.	Nadine Mandiau	Submission (armbar)	2	3:54
Featherweight	Eduardo Tejada	def.	Carlos Tenorio	KO (punches)	1	2:39
Featherweight	Raul Rosas Jr.	def.	Joel Peña	Submission (armbar)	1	0:54
Featherweight	Eduardo Vázquez	def.	Diego Beristaín	TKO	2	2:44

== UWC Mexico 33: Sabori vs. Rodríguez ==
UWC Mexico 33: Sabori vs. Rodríguez
- Promotion: Ultimate Warrior Challenge Mexico
- Date: April 29, 2022
- Venue: El Foro
- City: Tijuana, Mexico

Event chronology
UWC Mexico 32: Sánchez vs. Valencia	UWC Mexico 33: Sabori vs. Rodríguez	UWC Mexico 34: Carvalho vs. Camilo

UWC Mexico 33: Sabori vs. Rodríguez was a mixed martial arts event held by Ultimate Warrior Challenge Mexico on April 29, 2022, at El Foro in Tijuana, Mexico.

=== Background ===
A fight for the UWC Lightweight Championship between Ángel Rodríguez and Pablo Sabori headlined event.

The co-main event was a UWC Featherweight Championship fight between Luis Meráz and Jesús Alberto Ramos.

Additionally, the event marked the debut of Marco Antonio Elpidio, who had previously fought in Combate Americas and LUX Fight League.

=== Results ===
Main card
Weight class				Method	Round	Time	Notes
Lightweight	Pablo Sabori	def.	Ángel Rodríguez	TKO (Knee and Punches)	3	1:31	(Note: For the UWC Lightweight Championship)
Featherweight	Luis Meráz	def.	Jesús Alberto Ramos	Submission (shoulder choke)	4	1:31	(Note: For the UWC Featherweight Championship)
Lightweight	Marco Antonio Elpidio	def.	Leonardo Blasco	TKO (knees to the body)	2	4:50
Featherweight	Aaron Cañarte	def.	Walter Reyes	KO (punches)	1	1:56
Bantamweight	Juan Díaz	def.	Andrés Leal	Decision (unanimous)	3	5:00
Catchweight (149lb)	Mauricio Eguiluz	def.	Alexander Barahona	Decision (unanimous)	3	5:00
Welterweight	Arjuna Arreola	def.	Abraham Arellano	Submission (rear-naked choke)	1	1:07
Catchweight (139lb)	Luis Piñango	def.	Aaron Higuera	Submission (rear-naked choke)	1	1:52
Flyweight	Juan Rebolledo	def.	Miguel Ramírez	TKO (punches)	2	1:12
Featherweight	Raul Rosas Jr.	def.	Francisco Villanueva	Submission (armbar)	1	2:07
Featherweight	Francisco Javier Magallón	def.	Angello Pinto	Technical submission (rear-naked choke)	1	3:11
Catchweight (139lb)	Esteban Sedano	def.	Francisco Benítez	Decision (unanimous)	3	5:00
Women's Strawweight	Damara Vargas	def.	Dayerlin Colmenares	Submission (Rear-Naked Choke)	2	4:27

== UWC Mexico 34: Carvalho vs. Camilo ==
UWC Mexico 34: Carvalho vs. Camilo
- Promotion: Ultimate Warrior Challenge Mexico
- Date: May 27, 2022
- Venue: Entram Gym
- City: Tijuana, Mexico

Event chronology
UWC Mexico 33: Sabori vs. Rodríguez	UWC Mexico 34: Carvalho vs. Camilo	UWC Mexico 35: Luna vs. Campos

UWC Mexico 34: Carvalho vs. Camilo was a mixed martial arts event held by Ultimate Warrior Challenge Mexico on May 27, 2022, at the Entram Gym in Tijuana, Mexico.

=== Background ===
A fight for the UWC Flyweight Championship between champion Sóslenis Carvalho and João Camilo headlined event.

The co-main event featured a lightweight fight between Cristhian Rivas and Gilberto Santos.

=== Results ===
Main card
Weight class				Method	Round	Time	Notes
Flyweight	João Camilo	def.	Sóslenis Carvalho	Submission (Rear-Naked Choke)	5	2:56	(Note: For the UWC Flyweight Championship)
Featherweight	Cristhian Rivas	def.	Gilberto Santos	TKO (submission to punches)	3	4:42
Flyweight	Fernanda Muñoz	def.	Sandra Chimeyo	TKO (punches)	1	2:19
Welterweight	Tyler VanKill	def.	Hiram Furukawa	Submission (rear-naked choke)	1	1:23
Bantamweight	Raul Rosas Jr.	def.	José Peñaloza	Submission (rear-naked choke)	2	2:25
Middleweight	Viktor Kuiks	def.	Braulio Hernández	TKO (doctor stoppage)	1	500
Featherweight	Kallum Parker	def.	Eduardo Cardiel	TKO (punches)	1	0:27

== UWC Mexico 35: Luna vs. Campos ==
UWC Mexico 35: Luna vs. Campos
- Promotion: Ultimate Warrior Challenge Mexico
- Date: June 24, 2022
- Venue: El Foro
- City: Tijuana, Mexico

Event chronology
UWC Mexico 34: Carvalho vs. Camilo	UWC Mexico 35: Luna vs. Campos	UWC Mexico 36: Díaz vs. García

UWC Mexico 35: Luna vs. Campos was a mixed martial arts event held by Ultimate Warrior Challenge Mexico on June 24, 2022, at El Foro in Tijuana, Mexico.

=== Background ===
A fight for the UWC Bantamweight Championship between champion Adrián Luna Martinetti and Juan Campos headlined event.

The co-main event featured a lightweight fight between Akbarh Arreola and Walter Luna.

=== Results ===
Main card
Weight class				Method	Round	Time	Notes
Bantamweight	Adrián Luna Martinetti	def.	Juan Campos	KO (punches)	1	2:36	(Note: For the UWC Bantamweight Championship)
Catchweight (192 lb)	Akbarh Arreola	def.	Walter Luna	Submission (armbar)	1	2:16
Flyweight	Daniel Barez	def.	Paul Márquez	TKO (punches)	1	3:06
Middleweight	Ricardo Chávez Villaseñor	def.	Antonio Gordillo	TKO (punches)	1	0:40
Catchweight (140 lb)	Rachid El Hazoume	def.	Ángel Rodríguez	Decision (unanimous)	3	5:00
Welterweight	Arjuna Arreola	def.	Freddy May	Decision (unanimous)	3	5:00
Women's Flyweight	Jazmín Navarrete	def.	Nadine Mandiau	Decision (unanimous)	3	5:00
Bantamweight	Jessie Rosas	def.	Eliu Trujillo	Disqualification (illegal knee)	2	1:44
Bantamweight	Raul Rosas Jr.	def.	Andrés Portocarrero	TKO (punches)	1	2:11
Featherweight	Joel Peña	def.	Luis Escudero	TKO (punches)	1	4:58
Featherweight	José Juan Acuña	vs.	Eduardo Vázquez	No Contest (accidental groin kick)	1	2:51
Flyweight	Alan Martínez	def.	Cesar Juárez	TKO (punches)	1	3:40

== UWC Mexico 36: Díaz vs. García ==
UWC Mexico 36: Díaz vs. García
- Promotion: Ultimate Warrior Challenge Mexico
- Date: July 29, 2022
- Venue: Entram Gym
- City: Tijuana, Mexico

Event chronology
UWC Mexico 35: Luna vs. Campos	UWC Mexico 36: Díaz vs. García	UWC Mexico 37: Sánchez vs. Granados

UWC Mexico 36: Díaz vs. García was a mixed martial arts event held by Ultimate Warrior Challenge Mexico on July 29, 2022, at the Entram Gym in Tijuana, Mexico.

=== Background ===
A bantamweight fight between Mahatma Garcia and the undefeated UWC Cristhian Rivas headlined the event.

=== Results ===
Main card
Weight class				Method	Round	Time	Notes
Bantamweight	Cristhian Rivas	def.	Mahatma García	Decision (unanimous)	3	5:00
Catchweight (129 lb)	Sóslenis Carvalho	def.	Salvador Velásquez	Submission (Arm-Triangle Choke)	2	4:13
Flyweight	Hugo Torres	def.	Bryan Martínez	Submission (rear-naked choke)	1	2:42
Bantamweight	Braían González	def.	Raúl Rosete	Submission (rear-naked choke)	1	3:12
Middleweight	Viktor Kuiks	def.	Luis Guzmán	TKO (doctor stoppage)	1	3:13
Bantamweight	Brandon Uruchurtu	def.	Fernando Vázquez	KO (punch)	1	4:50
Flyweight	Luis Elías	def.	Martín Reyes	KO (punch to the body)	1	3:51
Women's Strawweight	Dayerlin Colmenares	def.	Melany Gómez	Decision (unanimous)	3	5:00

== UWC Mexico 37: Sánchez vs. Granados ==
UWC Mexico 37: Sánchez vs. Granados
- Promotion: Ultimate Warrior Challenge Mexico
- Date: August 26, 2022
- Venue: Entram Gym
- City: Tijuana, Mexico

Event chronology
UWC Mexico 36: Díaz vs. García	UWC Mexico 37: Sánchez vs. Granados	UWC Mexico 38: Camilo vs. González

UWC Mexico 37: Sánchez vs. Granados was a mixed martial arts event held by Ultimate Warrior Challenge Mexico on August 26, 2022, at the Entram Gym in Tijuana, Mexico.

=== Background ===
A catchweight fight between Alejandro "Hulk" Sanchez and Enrique Granados headlined the event.

The co-main event featured a welterweight fight between Alejandro Almanza and Leonardo Blasco.

=== Results ===
Main card
Weight class				Method	Round	Time	Notes
Catchweight (165 lb)	Alejandro Sánchez	def.	Enrique Granados Farrera	TKO (punches)	1	3:33
Welterweight	Leonardo Blasco	def.	Alejandro Almanza	TKO (punches)	1	2:25
Welterweight	Adrián Oviedo	def.	Miguel Arizmendi	TKO (punches)	2	4:22
Featherweight	Mauricio Eguiluz	def.	Ángel Rodríguez	Decision (unanimous)	3	5:00
Welterweight	Tyler VanKill	def.	José Luis Ríos	TKO (punches)	1	0:57
Featherweight	Alejandro Gavidia	def.	Kevin Arreola	TKO (punches)	1	0:57

== UWC Mexico 38: Camilo vs. González ==
UWC Mexico 38: Camilo vs. González
- Promotion: Ultimate Warrior Challenge Mexico
- Date: September 30, 2022
- Venue: Entram Gym
- City: Tijuana, Mexico

Event chronology
UWC Mexico 37: Sánchez vs. Granados	UWC Mexico 38: Camilo vs. González	UWC Mexico 39: Meráz vs. Ramos

UWC Mexico 38: Camilo vs. González was a mixed martial arts event held by Ultimate Warrior Challenge Mexico on September 30, 2022, at the Entram Gym in Tijuana, Mexico.

=== Background ===
A featherweight fight between a Braián González and João Camilo headlined the event.

=== Results ===
Main card
Weight class				Method	Round	Time	Notes
Featherweight	Braían González	def.	João Camilo	Decision (unanimous)	3	5:00
Featherweight	Rachid El Hazoume	def.	Leonardo Morales	Decision (majority)	3	5:00
Light Heavyweight	Antonio Gordillo	def.	Jesus Wong	Submission (toe hold)	1	3:29
Catchweight (130 lb)	Alan Martínez	def.	Christian Cerda	Decision (unanimous)	3	5:00
Featherweight	Esteban Sedano	def.	Leandro Urquiza	KO (punch to the body)	3	0:56
Featherweight	Eduardo Vázquez	def.	Francisco Villanueva	Submission (rear-naked choke)	3	1:24
Featherweight	Juan Rebolledo	def.	Cesar Juárez	Submission (rear-naked choke)	1	4:35
Catchweight (130 lb)	Freddie Johnson	def.	Fernando Vázquez	Decision (unanimous)	3	5:00

== UWC Mexico 39: Meráz vs. Ramos ==
UWC Mexico 39: Meráz vs. Ramos
- Promotion: Ultimate Warrior Challenge Mexico
- Date: October 28, 2022
- Venue: Entram Gym
- City: Tijuana, Mexico

Event chronology
UWC Mexico 38: Camilo vs. González	UWC Mexico 39: Meráz vs. Ramos	UWC Mexico 40: Sabori vs. Sánchez

UWC Mexico 39: Meráz vs. Ramos was a mixed martial arts event held by Ultimate Warrior Challenge Mexico on October 28, 2022, at the Entram Gym in Tijuana, Mexico.

=== Background ===
A fight for the UWC Featherweight Championship between champion Luis Meráz and Dorian Ramos headlined event.

=== Results ===
Main card
Weight class				Method	Round	Time	Notes
Featherweight	Dorian Ramos	def.	Luis Meráz	Decision (unanimous)	5	5:00	(Note: For the UWC Featherweight Championship)
Featherweight	Aarón Cañarte	def.	Iván Maya	Submission (arm-triangle choke)	2	0:52
Featherweight	Maurico Eguiluz	def.	Román Córdova	Decision (unanimous)	3	5:00
Lightweight	Hugo Oyarzún	def.	Víctor Manuel Rizzo	TKO (punches)	1	3:16
Middleweight	Victor Kuiks	def.	Hiram Furukawa	TKO (submission to leg kicks and punches)	2	0:46
Flyweight	Luis Elías	def.	Brandon Uruchurtu	KO (head kick)	1	1:05
Featherweight	Luis Escudero	def.	Hugo Rubio	KO (punch and soccer kick)	1	1:38

== UWC Mexico 40: Sabori vs. Sánchez ==
UWC Mexico 40: Sabori vs. Sánchez
- Promotion: Ultimate Warrior Challenge Mexico
- Date: November 25, 2022
- Venue: Entram Gym
- City: Tijuana, Mexico

Event chronology
UWC Mexico 39: Meráz vs. Ramos	UWC Mexico 40: Sabori vs. Sánchez	UWC Mexico 41: Mascarado vs. Prototipo

UWC Mexico 40: Sabori vs. Sánchez was a mixed martial arts event held by Ultimate Warrior Challenge Mexico on November 25, 2022, at the Entram Gym in Tijuana, Mexico.

=== Background ===
A fight for the UWC Lightweight Championship between champion Pablo Sabori and Alberto Sánchez headlined event.

The co-main event was a UWC Bantamweight Championship fight between champion Adrián Luna Martinetti and Ricardo Ramírez.

=== Results ===
Main card
Weight class				Method	Round	Time	Notes
Lightweight	Pablo Sabori	def.	Alberto Sánchez	TKO (head kick and punches)	2	1:09	(Note: For the UWC Lightweight Championship)
Featherweight	Adrián Luna Martinetti	def.	Ricardo Ramírez	Submission (rear-naked choke)	1	3:47	(Note: For the UWC Bantamweight Championship)
Flyweight	Daniel Barez	def.	Francisco Benítez	Submission (rear-naked choke)	1	2:15
Flyweight	Édgar Cháirez	def.	Roberto Guerrero	Submission (guillotine choke)	1	1:03
Featherweight	Eduardo Vázquez	def.	Francisco Magallón	KO (punches)	1	1:56
Bantamweight	Juan Pablo González	def.	Juan Campos	TKO (punch)	1	3:10
Welterweight	Freddy May	def.	Alexis Miranda	Decision (split)	3	5:00
Catchweight (138 lb)	Eliu Trujillo	def.	Steven Almeida	Decision (unanimous)	3	5:00
