= 2020 in Ultimate Warrior Challenge Mexico =

Information
- First date: February 29, 2020
- Last date: November 13, 2020

Events
- Total events: 4

Fights
- Total fights: 39
- Title fights: 10

The year 2020 was the nine year in the history of Ultimate Warrior Challenge Mexico, a mixed martial arts promotion based in Mexico. In these year, UWC held 4 event.

== Events list ==
| # | Event | Date | Venue | Location |
|---|---|---|---|---|
| 1 | UWC Mexico 21: Bloody Valentine Part Deux | February 29, 2020 | Auditorio Municipal | Tijuana, Mexico |
| 2 | UWC Mexico 22: Total War | July 3, 2020 | Entram Gym | Tijuana, Mexico |
| 3 | UWC Mexico 23: Supremacy | September 4, 2020 | Entram Gym | Tijuana, Mexico |
| 4 | UWC Mexico 24: Friday the 13th | November 13, 2020 | Entram Gym | Tijuana, Mexico |

== UWC Mexico 21: Bloody Valentine Part Deux ==
UWC Mexico 21: Bloody Valentine Part Deux
- Promotion: Ultimate Warrior Challenge Mexico
- Date: February 29, 2020
- Venue: Auditorio Municipal
- City: Tijuana, Mexico

Event chronology
| UWC Mexico: New Blood 3 | UWC Mexico 21: Bloody Valentine Part Deux | UWC Mexico 22: Total War |

UWC Mexico 21: Bloody Valentine Part Deux was a mixed martial arts event held by Ultimate Warrior Challenge Mexico on February 29, 2020, at the Auditorio Municipal de Tijuana in Tijuana, Mexico.

=== Background ===
The main event featured a UWC Lightweight Championship fight between Edgar Escarrega and Fabián Quintanar.

The co-main event was a UWC Featherweight Championship fight between Luis Meráz and Miguel Enrique Torres.

In addition, a two titles fight was scheduled for the event: Jesús Santos Aguilar vs. Antoine Hidrio for the UWC flyweight championship. and Jesús Navarrete vs. José Malacón for the UWC heavyweight championship.

=== Results ===
Main card
| Weight class | | | | Method | Round | Time | Notes |
|---|---|---|---|---|---|---|---|
| Lightweight | Edgar Escarrega | def. | Fabián Quintanar | KO (punch) | 2 | 3:47 | (Note: For the UWC Lightweight Championship) |
| Featherweight | Luis Meráz | def. | Miguel Enrique Torres | Submission (rear-naked choke) | 2 | 2:10 | (Note: For the UWC Featherweight Championship) |
| Flyweight | Jesús Santos Aguilar | def. | Antoine Hidrio | Submission (guillotine choke) | 1 | 2:07 | (Note: For the UWC Flyweight Championship) |
| Heavyweight | Jesús Navarrete | def. | José Malacon | TKO | 1 | 1:40 | (Note: For the UWC Heavyweight Championship) |
| Featherweight | Erik Radleim | def. | Mauricio Nievas | Decision (unanimous) | 3 | 5:00 |
| Lightweight | Christopher Ramírez | def. | Rodolfo Reseck | TKO | 2 | 2:05 |
| Featherweight | Christian Hermosillo | def. | Aaron Higuera | Submission (toe hold) | 1 | 2:37 |
| Flyweight | Jhoao Ruíz | def. | Luis Aguirre | Decision (split) | 3 | 5:00 |
| Featherweight | Ángel Torres | def. | Eduardo Velásquez | Submission (rear-naked choke) | 2 | 4:14 |

== UWC Mexico 22: Total War ==
UWC Mexico 22: Total War
- Promotion: Ultimate Warrior Challenge Mexico
- Date: July 3, 2020
- Venue: Entram Gym
- City: Tijuana, Mexico

Event chronology
| UWC Mexico 21: Bloody Valentine Part Deux | UWC Mexico 22: Total War | UWC Mexico 23: Supremacy |

UWC Mexico 22: Total War was a mixed martial arts event held by Ultimate Warrior Challenge Mexico on July 3, 2020, at the Entram Gym in Tijuana, Mexico.

=== Background ===
UWC Mexico 22 was the first to be held behind closed doors, due to the COVID-19 pandemic that began in March 2020. It also marked the debut of the Entram Gym as the venue for an event by the promoter.

The main event featured a UWC Heavyweight Championship fight between champion Jesús Navarrete and Eliezer Ortega.

The co-main event featured a welterweight fight between Alejandro "Hulk" Sanchez and Ivan Maya.

=== Results ===
Main card
| Weight class | | | | Method | Round | Time | Notes |
|---|---|---|---|---|---|---|---|
| Heavyweight | Jesús Navarrete | def. | Eliezer Ortega | TKO (punches) | 3 | 4:31 | (Note: For the UWC Heavyweight Championship) |
| Welterweight | Alejandro Sánchez | def. | Iván Maya | Submission (rear-naked choke) | 2 | 4:09 |
| Heavyweight | Jorge González | def. | Marcos Rodríguez | Submission (rear-naked choke) | 1 | 1:05 |
| Women's Bantamweight | Joselyne Edwards | def. | Pamela González | KO (punches and body kick) | 1 | 0:28 |
| Catchweight | Leandro Urquiza | def. | Leonel Padilla | TKO (leg kick) | 2 | 2:51 |
| Featherweight | Mauricio Nievas | def. | Brandon Uruchurtu | Decision (unanimous) | 3 | 5:00 |
| Featherweight | Abraham Nava | def. | Alan Varela | TKO | 1 | 3:48 |
| Flyweight | Hugo Torres | def. | Alex Navarro | TKO (punches) | 1 | 2:02 |

== UWC Mexico 23: Supremacy ==
UWC Mexico 23: Supremacy
- Promotion: Ultimate Warrior Challenge Mexico
- Date: September 4, 2020
- Venue: Entram Gym
- City: Tijuana, Mexico

Event chronology
| UWC Mexico 22: Total War | UWC Mexico 23: Supremacy | UWC Mexico 24: Friday The 13th |

UWC Mexico 23: Supremacy was a mixed martial arts event held by Ultimate Warrior Challenge Mexico on September 4, 2020, at the Entram Gym in Tijuana, Mexico.

=== Background ===
As with the previous event, COVID-19 testing was conducted to safeguard the safety of the fighters and other workers.

The main event featured a UWC Flyweight Championship fight between champion Jesús Santos Aguilar and Édgar Cháirez.

The co-main event featured a welterweight fight between Alejandro "Hulk" Sanchez and Jorge Olea.

=== Results ===
Main card
| Weight class | | | | Method | Round | Time | Notes |
|---|---|---|---|---|---|---|---|
| Flyweight | Jesús Santos Aguilar | def. | Édgar Cháirez | Submission (guillotine choke) | 5 | 4:41 | (Note: For the UWC Flyweight Championship) |
| Welterweight | Alejandro Sánchez | def. | Jorge Olea | Decision (unanimous) | 3 | 5:00 |
| Lightweight | Luis Meráz | def. | Rodolfo Reseck | Submission (rear-naked choke) | 1 | 0:33 |
| Women's Flyweight | María José Favela | def. | Jessica Solís | Submission (rear-naked choke) | 1 | 1:12 |
| Welterweight | Daniel James Allen | def. | Iván Maya | TKO (retirement) | 2 | 5:00 |
| Lightweight | Janz Fuentes | def. | Rafael Rodríguez | TKO (punches) | 1 | 1:19 |
| Bantamweight | Abraham Nava | def. | Aarón Higuera | Decision (unanimous) | 3 | 5:00 |
| Featherweight | Alejandro Gavidia | def. | Jonathan Linares | Submission (rear-naked choke) | 2 | 1:26 |
| Middleweight | Alfonso Leyva | def. | Yasser Guzmán | TKO (punches) | 1 | 0:35 |

== UWC Mexico 24: Friday the 13th ==
UWC Mexico 24: Friday the 13th
- Promotion: Ultimate Warrior Challenge Mexico
- Date: November 13, 2020
- Venue: Entram Gym
- City: Tijuana, Mexico

Event chronology
| UWC Mexico 23: Supremacy | UWC Mexico 24: Friday the 13th | UWC Mexico 25: Quinóñez vs. Matos |

UWC Mexico 24: Friday the 13th was a mixed martial arts event held by Ultimate Warrior Challenge Mexico on November 13, 2020, at the Entram Gym in Tijuana, Mexico.

=== Background ===
The main event featured a UWC Lightweight Championship fight between José Luis Verdugo and Carlos Cañada.

The co-main event was a UWC Heavyweight Championship fight between champion Jesús Navarrete and Enrique Lara.

Additionally, it was announced that former Brave CF fighter Cristian Quiñónez and former LUX bantamweight championship contender Erick Ruano Barrera would face off in a bout whose winner would challenge then-champion Antonio Duarte.

=== Results ===
Main card
| Weight class | | | | Method | Round | Time | Notes |
|---|---|---|---|---|---|---|---|
| Lightweight | José Luis Verdugo | def. | Carlos Cañada | TKO (head kick and punches) | 2 | 3:53 | (Note: For the UWC Lightweight Championship) |
| Heavyweight | Jesús Navarrete | def. | Enrique Lara | TKO (punches) | 1 | 0:47 | (Note: For the UWC Heavyweight Championship) |
| Bantamweight | Cristian Quiñónez | def. | Erick Ruano Barrera | TKO (punches) | 1 | 4:58 | (Note: For the UWC Bantamweight Championship) |
| Strawweight | Yazmin Jauregui | def. | Annely Jímenez García | TKO (doctor stoppage) | 1 | 5:00 | (Note: For the UWC Women's Strawweight Championship) |
| Flyweight | María José Favela | def. | Esther Pérez | Decision (unanimous) | 3 | 5:00 |
| Flyweight | Mark Climaco | def. | Igor Siqueira | Submission (rear-naked choke) | 2 | 4:24 |
| Catchweight | Mauricio Nievas | def. | Carlos Castañeda | Decision (unanimous) | 3 | 5:00 |
| Lightweight | Leandro Urquiza | def. | Marco González | Decision (unanimous) | 3 | 5:00 |
| Catchweight | Daniel James Allen | def. | Iván Burgos | KO | 1 | 0:17 |
| Catchweight | Alfonso Leyva | def. | Luis Guzmán | KO | 1 | 1:48 |
| Flyweight | Hugo Torres | def. | Luis Aguirre | TKO (injury) | 2 | 5:00 |
| Lightweight | Carlos Arana | def. | Román López | Decision (unanimous) | 3 | 5:00 |
| Welterweight | Fabrizio Escarrega | def. | Cristian de los Santos | TKO (punches) | 1 | 3:50 |
