= 2023 in Ultimate Warrior Challenge Mexico =

Information
- First date: February 24, 2023
- Last date: November 24, 2023

Events
- Total events: 10

Fights
- Total fights: 79
- Title fights: 10

The year 2023 was the 12th year in the history of Ultimate Warrior Challenge Mexico, a mixed martial arts promotion based in Mexico. In these year, UWC held 10 event.

== Events list ==
#	Event	Date	Venue	Location
1	UWC Mexico 41: Mascarado vs. Prototipo	February 24, 2023	Entram Gym	Tijuana, Mexico
2	UWC Mexico 42: Luna vs. Matos	March 31, 2023	Entram Gym	Tijuana, Mexico
3	UWC Mexico 43: Ramos vs. Peñaloza	April 28, 2023	Auditorio Municipal	Tijuana, Mexico
4	UWC Mexico 44: Prototipo vs. El Rey	May 26, 2023	Entram Gym	Tijuana, Mexico
5	UWC Mexico 45: Chávez vs. Gordillo 2	July 2, 2023	Auditorio Municipal	Tijuana, Mexico
6	UWC Mexico 46: Elpidio vs. Nunes	July 28, 2023	Auditorio Municipal	Tijuana, Mexico
7	UWC Mexico 47: El Hazoume vs. Ramos	August 25, 2023	Auditorio Municipal	Tijuana, Mexico
8	UWC Mexico 48: Gordillo vs. De Paula	September 29, 2023	Entram Gym	Tijuana, Mexico
9	UWC Mexico 49: Oviedo vs. Zadruzynski	October 27, 2023	Entram Gym	Tijuana, Mexico
10	UWC Mexico 50: González vs. García	November 24, 2023	Entram Gym	Tijuana, Mexico

== UWC Mexico 41: Mascarado vs. Prototipo ==
UWC Mexico 41: Mascarado vs. Prototipo
- Promotion: Ultimate Warrior Challenge Mexico
- Date: February 24, 2023
- Venue: Entram Gym
- City: Tijuana, Mexico

Event chronology
UWC Mexico 40: Sabori vs. Sánchez	UWC Mexico 41: Mascarado vs. Prototipo	UWC Mexico 42: Luna vs. Matos

UWC Mexico 41: Mascarado vs. Prototipo was a mixed martial arts event held by Ultimate Warrior Challenge Mexico on February 24, 2023, at the Entram Gym in Tijuana, Mexico.

=== Background ===
A fight for the UWC Flyweight Championship between champion João Camilo and Braián González headlined event.

The co-main event was a UWC Featherweight Championship fight between champion Dorian Ramos and Mauricio Eguiluz.

=== Results ===
Main card
Weight class				Method	Round	Time	Notes
Flyweight	Braián González	def.	João Camilo	Decision (unanimous)	5	5:00	(Note: For the UWC Flyweight Championship)
Featherweight	Dorian Ramos	def.	Mauricio Eguiluz	Submission (rear-naked choke)	5	1:46	(Note: For the UWC Featherweight Championship)
Flyweight	Daniel Barez	def.	Sóslenis Carvalho	TKO (punches)	1	1:33
Bantamweight	Andrés Luna Martinetti	def.	Neftaly Martínez	Submission (kimura)	2	4:40
Bantamweight	Rachid Haz	def.	Victor Nuñez	TKO (punches)	3	3:37
Bantamweight	Jessie Rosas	def.	Cesar Bañuelos	Submission (armbar)	1	3:16
Flyweight	Alan Martínez	def.	Jesús Garnica	Submission (keylock)	2	3:02
Flyweight	Luis Elías	def.	Sergio Quintero	Submission (armbar)	1	3:02

== UWC Mexico 42: Luna vs. Matos ==
UWC Mexico 42: Luna vs. Matos
- Promotion: Ultimate Warrior Challenge Mexico
- Date: March 31, 2023
- Venue: Entram Gym
- City: Tijuana, Mexico

Event chronology
UWC Mexico 41: Mascarado vs. Prototipo	UWC Mexico 42: Luna vs. Matos	UWC Mexico 43: Ramos vs. Peñaloza

UWC Mexico 42: Luna vs. Matos was a mixed martial arts event held by Ultimate Warrior Challenge Mexico on March 31, 2023, at the Entram Gym in Tijuana, Mexico.

=== Background ===
A fight for the UWC Bantamweight Championship between champion Adrián Luna Martinetti and Adonilton Matos headlined event.

=== Results ===
Main card
Weight class				Method	Round	Time	Notes
Bantamweight	Adrián Luna Martinetti	def.	Adonilton Matos	Decision (unanimous)	5	5:00	(Note: For the UWC Bantamweight Championship)
Bantamweight	Juan Pablo González	def.	Bryan Martínez	Decision (unanimous)	3	5:00
Bantamweight	Jessie Rosas	def.	Alejandro Quero	Submission (triangle armbar)	1	1:27
Middleweight	Jesus Wong	def.	Victor Kuiks	Decision (unanimous)	3	5:00
Lightweight	Eduardo Vázquez	def.	Román Córdova	Decision (unanimous)	3	5:00
Flyweight	Hugo Torres	def.	Sóslenis Carvalho	Decision (unanimous)	3	5:00
Welterweight	Alexis Miranda	def.	Abraham Arellano	TKO (leg kicks)	1	1:46
Women's Strawweight	Karla Pastrana	def.	Dayerlin Colmenares	Submission (armbar)	1	3:09

== UWC Mexico 43: Ramos vs. Peñaloza ==
UWC Mexico 43: Ramos vs. Peñaloza
- Promotion: Ultimate Warrior Challenge Mexico
- Date: April 28, 2023
- Venue: Auditorio Municipal
- City: Tijuana, Mexico

Event chronology
UWC Mexico 42: Luna vs. Matos	UWC Mexico 43: Ramos vs. Peñaloza	UWC Mexico 44: Prototipo vs. El Rey

UWC Mexico 43: Ramos vs. Peñaloza was a mixed martial arts event held by Ultimate Warrior Challenge Mexico on April 28, 2023, at the Auditorio Municipal de Tijuana in Tijuana, Mexico.

=== Background ===
A fight for the UWC Featherweight Championship between champion João Camilo and Braián González headlined event.

=== Results ===
Main card
Weight class				Method	Round	Time	Notes
Featherweight	Dorian Ramos	def.	José Peñaloza	TKO (punches)	2	2:57	(Note: For the UWC Featherweight Championship)
Welterweight	Arjuna Arreola	def.	Carlos Tenorio	Submission (triangle choke)	2	1:48
Bantamweight	Diego Villar	def.	Victor Nuñez	Decision (unanimous)	3	5:00
Featherweight	Mauricio Eguiluz	def.	Román López	Decision (unanimous)	3	5:00
Flyweight	Luis Elías	def.	Lennin Morales	TKO (elbows and punches)	2	2:28
Catchweight (117 lb)	Jazmín Navarrete	def.	Fernanda Escudero	TKO (punches)	2	2:25
Catchweight (138 lb)	Santiago Luna	def.	Einar González	Submission (rear-naked choke)	1	2:56
Catchweight (175 lb)	Alexis Miranda	def.	Victor Robles	Decision (unanimous)	3	5:00

== UWC Mexico 44: Prototipo vs. El Rey ==
UWC Mexico 44: Prototipo vs. El Rey
- Promotion: Ultimate Warrior Challenge Mexico
- Date: May 26, 2023
- Venue: Entram Gym
- City: Tijuana, Mexico

Event chronology
UWC Mexico 43: Ramos vs. Peñaloza	UWC Mexico 44: Prototipo vs. El Rey	UWC Mexico 45: Chávez vs. Gordillo 2

UWC Mexico 44: Prototipo vs. El Rey was a mixed martial arts event held by Ultimate Warrior Challenge Mexico on May 26, 2023, at the Entram Gym in Tijuana, Mexico.

=== Background ===
A fight for the UWC Flyweight Championship between Braián González and Carlos Puente Jr. headlined event.

=== Results ===
Main card
Weight class				Method	Round	Time	Notes
Flyweight	Braían González	def.	Carlos Puente Jr.	Decision (unanimous)	5	5:00	(Note: For the UWC Flyweight Championship)
Flyweight	Alan Martínez	def.	Yahir Ramírez	Decision (unanimous)	3	5:00
Featherweight	Mauricio Eguiluz	def.	Daniel Vega	Decision (unanimous)	3	5:00
Lightweight	Hugo Oyarzún	def.	Iván Maya	Submission (rear-naked choke)	3	1:05
Catchweight (117 lb)	Damara Vargas	def.	Cecilia Ulloa	Decision (split)	3	5:00
Bantamweight	Eliu Trujillo	def.	David Berai Quiros	Decision (unanimous)	3	5:00

== UWC Mexico 45: Chávez vs. Gordillo 2 ==
UWC Mexico 45: Chávez vs. Gordillo 2
- Promotion: Ultimate Warrior Challenge Mexico
- Date: July 2, 2023
- Venue: Auditorio Municipal
- City: Tijuana, Mexico

Event chronology
UWC Mexico 44: Prototipo vs. El Rey	UWC Mexico 45: Chávez vs. Gordillo 2	UWC Mexico 46: Elpidio vs. Nunes

UWC Mexico 45: Chávez vs. Gordillo 2 was a mixed martial arts event held by Ultimate Warrior Challenge Mexico on July 2, 2023, at the Auditorio Municipal de Tijuana in Tijuana, Mexico.

=== Background ===
A fight for the vacant UWC Middleweight Championship between Antonio Gordillo and Ricardo Chávez Villaseñor headlined event. The two fighters had faced each other at UWC Mexico 35 in June 2022, which ended with a victory for Woody Chavez.

=== Results ===
Main card
Weight class				Method	Round	Time	Notes
Middleweight	Antonio Gordillo	def.	Ricardo Chávez Villaseñor	Submission (arm-triangle choke)	3	1:56	(Note: For the UWC Middleweight Championship)
Bantamweight	Mahatma García	def.	Vicente Vargas	Decision (unanimous)	3	5:00
Bantamweight	Juan Pablo González	def.	Brandon Uruchurtu	Decision (unanimous)	3	5:00
Flyweight	Luis Elías	def.	Angel Muñoz	Submission (calf slicer)	3	4:00
Featherweight	Benjamín Poggi	def.	Kenny Harrison	Submission (rear-naked choke)	1	4:08
Bantamweight	Santiago Prieto	def.	Jesús Garnica	TKO (elbows and punches)	1	2:17
Featherweight	Alejandro Quero	def.	Luis Piñango	Submission (rear-naked choke)	2	4:37

== UWC Mexico 46: Elpidio vs. Nunes ==
UWC Mexico 46: Elpidio vs. Nunes
- Promotion: Ultimate Warrior Challenge Mexico
- Date: July 28, 2023
- Venue: Auditorio Municipal
- City: Tijuana, Mexico

Event chronology
UWC Mexico 45: Chávez vs. Gordillo 2	UWC Mexico 46: Elpidio vs. Nunes	UWC Mexico 47: El Hazoume vs. Ramos

UWC Mexico 46: Elpidio vs. Nunes was a mixed martial arts event held by Ultimate Warrior Challenge Mexico on July 28, 2023, at the Auditorio Municipal de Tijuana in Tijuana, Mexico.

=== Background ===
A fight for the vacant UWC Middleweight Championship between Marco Antonio Elpidio and Adriano Nunes headlined event.

=== Results ===
Main card
Weight class				Method	Round	Time	Notes
Lightweight	Adriano Nunes	def.	Marco Antonio Elpidio	TKO (head kick and punches)	2	2:42	(Note: For the UWC Lightweight Championship)
Welterweight	Hugo Oyarzún	def.	Román Córdova	Decision (unanimous)	3	5:00
Welterweight	Adrián Oviedo	def.	Carlos Palta	Submission (rear-naked choke)	1	4:29
Middleweight	Victor Kuiks	def.	Edgar González	Submission (arm-triangle choke)	1	2:57
Welterweight	Alexis Miranda	def.	Irving Molina	Decision (split)	3	5:00
Flyweight	Lenin Guerra	def.	Sergio Quintero	Submission (armbar)	1	2:48
Bantamweight	Santiago Luna	def.	Gerardo Aguillón	Submission (rear-naked choke)	2	4:34

== UWC Mexico 47: El Hazoume vs. Ramos ==
UWC Mexico 47: El Hazoume vs. Ramos
- Promotion: Ultimate Warrior Challenge Mexico
- Date: August 25, 2023
- Venue: Auditorio Municipal
- City: Tijuana, Mexico

Event chronology
UWC Mexico 46: Elpidio vs. Nunes	UWC Mexico 47: El Hazoume vs. Ramos	UWC Mexico 48: Gordillo vs. De Paula

UWC Mexico 47: El Hazoume vs. Ramos was a mixed martial arts event held by Ultimate Warrior Challenge Mexico on August 25, 2023, at the Auditorio Municipal de Tijuana in Tijuana, Mexico.

=== Background ===
A catchweight fight between Rachid El Hazoume and Jesús Alberto Ramos headlined the event.

=== Results ===
Main card
Weight class				Method	Round	Time	Notes
Catchweight (140 lb)	Rachid El Hazoume	def.	Jesús Alberto Ramos	Decision (unanimous)	3	5:00
Bantamweight	Juan Rebolledo	def.	Erick Morales	Submission (rear-naked choke)	1	4:57
Bantamweight	Alan Martínez	def.	Francisco Benítez	TKO (elbows and punches)	1	4:41
Lightweight	Eduardo Vázquez	def.	Esteban Nocelo	TKO (punches)	1	2:07
Featherweight	Benjamín Poggi	def.	Alejandro Quero	TKO (punches)	3	3:21
Featherweight	Luis Escudero	def.	Juan Campos	Submission (flying armbar)	1	1:11
Middleweight	Angel Ramírez	def.	César Bravo	TKO (punches)	1	3:04
Featherweight	Ruben García	def.	Antonio Hernández	TKO (punches)	1	0:31
Bantamweight	Diego Marchen	def.	Luis Huitrón	Submission (arm-triangle choke)	3	2:31
Catchweight (140 lb)	Daniel Hernández Bonal	def.	Edwin Pantoja	TKO (punches)	1	0:56
Featherweight	Salvador Hernández	def.	Kevin Casique	TKO (punches)	1	2:34
Welterweight	Jorge González	def.	Moisés López	TKO (punches)	2	2:32

== UWC Mexico 48: Gordillo vs. De Paula ==
UWC Mexico 48: Gordillo vs. De Paula
- Promotion: Ultimate Warrior Challenge Mexico
- Date: September 29, 2023
- Venue: Entram Gym
- City: Tijuana, Mexico

Event chronology
UWC Mexico 47: El Hazoume vs. Ramos	UWC Mexico 48: Gordillo vs. De Paula	UWC Mexico 49: Oviedo vs. Zadruzynski

UWC Mexico 48: Gordillo vs. De Paula was a mixed martial arts event held by Ultimate Warrior Challenge Mexico on September 29, 2023, at the Entram Gym in Tijuana, Mexico.

=== Background ===
A fight for the UWC Lightweight Championship between champion Antonio Gordillo and Alexander Barahona headlined event.

The co-main event was a UWC Flyweight Championship fight between champion Braían González and Matías Vásquez.

=== Results ===
Main card
Weight class				Method	Round	Time	Notes
Light Heavyweight	Antonio Gordillo	def.	Víctor de Paula	TKO (punches)	2	4:02	(Note: For the UWC Lightweight Championship)
Flyweight	Braían González	def.	Matías Vásquez	TKO (knee to the body and punches)	4	0:42	(Note: For the UWC Flyweight Championship)
Flyweight	Luis Elías	def.	Yahir Ramírez	TKO (rib injury)	2	0:03
Catchweight (130 lb)	Hugo Torres	def.	Sergio Quintero	TKO (punches)	1	5:00
Catchweight (145 lb)	Victor Kuiks	def.	Fausto Gómez	Decision (unanimous)	3	5:00
Lightweight	Abraham Ayala	def.	Steven Almeida	TKO (punches)	1	4:25
Women's Strawweight	Melany Gómez	def.	Jessica Solís	TKO (knee to the body and punches)	1	1:23

== UWC Mexico 49: Oviedo vs. Zadruzynski ==
UWC Mexico 49: Oviedo vs. Zadruzynski
- Promotion: Ultimate Warrior Challenge Mexico
- Date: October 27, 2023
- Venue: Entram Gym
- City: Tijuana, Mexico

Event chronology
UWC Mexico 48: Gordillo vs. De Paula	UWC Mexico 49: Oviedo vs. Zadruzynski	UWC Mexico 50: González vs. García

UWC Mexico 49: Oviedo vs. Zadruzynski was a mixed martial arts event held by Ultimate Warrior Challenge Mexico on October 27, 2023, at the Entram Gym in Tijuana, Mexico.

=== Background ===
A flyweight fight between an Adrián Oviedo and Filip Zadruzynski headlined the event.

=== Results ===
Main card
Weight class				Method	Round	Time	Notes
Catchweight (175 lb)	Adrián Oviedo	def.	Filip Zadruzynski	TKO (leg licks and punches)	2	1:30
Lightweight	Eduardo Vázquez	def.	Alberto Sánchez	Submission (rear-naked choke)	1	1:53
Bantamweight	Alfredo Laríos	def.	Bryan Martínez	Submission (heel hook)	2	4:57
Catchweight (130 lb)	Lenin Guerra	def.	Héctor Valenzuela	TKO (elbow and punches)	1	3:32
Bantamweight	Santiago Luna	def.	Emilio Galindo	Submission (rear-naked choke)	1	2:43
Catchweight (150 lb)	Rafael Saénz	def.	Iván Maya	Submission (armbar)	3	4:01
Featherweight	Ruben Garcia	def.	Gael Reséndiz	Technical submission (armbar)	3	2:09
Flyweight	Ángel Verdin Escobar	def.	Antonio Camacho	Submission (rear-naked choke)	1	2:59
Welterweight	Jorge González	def.	Antar Carbajal	Submission (rear-naked choke)	1	2:22
Lightweight	Salvador Hernández	def.	Oscar Ramos	Submission (kimura)	1	2:58

== UWC Mexico 50: González vs. García ==
UWC Mexico 50: González vs. García
- Promotion: Ultimate Warrior Challenge Mexico
- Date: November 24, 2023
- Venue: Entram Gym
- City: Tijuana, Mexico

Event chronology
UWC Mexico 49: Oviedo vs. Zadruzynski	UWC Mexico 50: González vs. García	UWC Mexico 51: García vs. Luna

UWC Mexico 50: González vs. García was a mixed martial arts event held by Ultimate Warrior Challenge Mexico on November 25, 2023, at the Entram Gym in Tijuana, Mexico.

=== Background ===
A fight for the vacant UWC Bantamweight Championship between champion Juan Pablo González and Mahatma García headlined event.

=== Results ===
Main card
Weight class				Method	Round	Time	Notes
Bantamweight	Mahatma García	def.	Juan Pablo González	Decision (unanimous)	5	5:00	(Note: For the UWC Bantamweight Championship)
Catchweight (130 lb)	Alan Martínez	def.	Inor Valladares	Decision (unanimous)	3	5:00
Catchweight (150 lb)	Alan Villalba	def.	Román Córdova	Decision (unanimous)	3	5:00
Welterweight	Wallison Silva	def.	Jesús Alberto Rangel	Submission (rear-naked choke)	1	3:53
Featherweight	Esteban Sedano	def.	Enrique Ortega	TKO (doctor stoppage)	3	0:03
Catchweight (120 lb)	Karla Pastrana	def.	Odeth Realyvásquez	TKO (elbows and punches)	1	1:36
