= Guillermo Torres (wrestler) =

Mexican mixed martial artist and former freestyle wrestler (born 1986)

- Born: Guillermo Torres Cervantes; August 19, 1986 (age 40); Guadalajara, Jalisco, Mexico
- Other names: Memo; El Mercenario
- Height: 5 ft 5 in (1.65 m)
- Weight: 136.8 lb (62 kg; 9 st 11 lb)
- Division: Bantamweight
- Fighting out of: Guadalajara, Mexico
- Team: Samurai Fight Center
- Years active: 2018–present

Mixed martial arts record
- Total: 9
- Wins: 7
- By knockout: 4
- By decision: 3
- Losses: 2
- By knockout: 1
- By decision: 1

Other information
- Mixed martial arts record from Sherdog
- Last updated on: November 19, 2012

Guillermo Torres Cervantes (born August 19, 1986) is a Mexican mixed martial artist and former freestyle wrestler.

== Wrestling career ==
He won a silver medal for the 60 kg division at the 2011 Pan American Games in his hometown. A few months later, he finished second at the 2012 Pan American Wrestling Olympic Qualification Tournament, which qualified him for the 2012 Summer Olympics in London. At the Olympics, Torres competed in the men's freestyle 60 kg class, where he was eliminated in the qualifying round after being defeated by Iran's Masoud Esmaeilpour, with a technical score of 1–8, and a classification point system of 1–3.

== Mixed martial arts career ==
=== Early career ===
After the Olympics, Torres retired from wrestling competition due to injuries that required surgeries and decided to focus on coaching children in wrestling and raising a family instead. He was introduced to submission grappling after being invited to train at Gym 58, where he learned quickly and was encouraged to compete. He eventually transitioned to MMA and made his debut on March 15, 2018, at CBF MMA - Dana White: Lookin' for a Fight, winning via unanimous decision. His second fight was for Combate Americas at Combate 27 on October 26, 2018, in his hometown. Torres won by first round TKO. He gained two more wins in Combate in 2019 before a hiatus.

=== Comeback fight at UWC Mexico ===
Torres made his return to MMA with a KO victory at the UWC Mexico 32's event of the Ultimate Warrior Challenge Mexico.

=== LUX Fight League ===
Torres made his promotional debut in LUX Fight League against Abraham Nava on September 2, 2022, at LUX 026. This fight ended his undefeated streak of five wins, after being knocked out in the first round.

In 2023, Torres was able to make up for his defeat with two more technical knockout victories against Alberto Garcia in LUX 034, and Victor Moreno in LUX 036.

=== The Ultimate Fighter ===
In March 2024, it was announced that Torres would be competing in the thirty-second season of The Ultimate Fighter.

Torres was the first chosen Featherweight for Team Grasso. He would be eliminated in the first episode after losing a decision to Roedie Roets.

Torres was later given another shot in the tournament when he was chosen to replace an injured Žygimantas Ramaška and face teammate Mairon Santos in the semi final round. He lost the bout by unanimous decision.

== Mixed martial arts record ==
Professional record breakdown
9 matches	7 wins	2 losses
By knockout	4	1
By decision	3	1

Res.	Record	Opponent	Method	Event	Date	Round	Time	Location	Notes
Loss	7–2	Otari Tanzilovi	Decision (unanimous)	Fury FC 101	February 7, 2025	3	5:00	Dallas, Texas, United States	
Win	7–1	Victor Moreno	TKO (punches)	LUX 036	October 6, 2023	1	3:55	Guadalajara, Mexico	
Win	6–1	Alberto García	TKO (punches)	LUX 034	July 21, 2023	2	1:00	Cancún, Mexico	
Loss	5–1	Abraham Nava	KO (punch)	LUX 026	September 2, 2022	1	0:51	Mexico City, Mexico	
Win	5–0	Giovanni Ricardo Ramirez	TKO (body kick and punches)	UWC Mexico 32	March 25, 2022	3	0:15	Tijuana, Mexico	
Win	4–0	Orlando Jimenez	Decision (unanimous)	Combate 46	October 11, 2019	3	5:00	Tucson, Arizona, United States	
Win	3–0	Caleb Moctezuma	Decision (unanimous)	Combate 32	March 8, 2019	3	5:00	Guadalajara, Mexico	
Win	2–0	Mario Tena	TKO (punches)	Combate 27	October 26, 2018	1	4:55	Guadalajara, Mexico	Catchweight (130 lb) bout.
Win	1–0	Marco Beristain Castillo	Decision (unanimous)	Cabo Bato Fights 1	March 15, 2018	3	5:00	Cabo San Lucas, Mexico	Bantamweight debut.

== Mixed martial arts exhibition record ==
Exhibition record breakdown		
2 matches	0 wins	2 losses
By decision	0	2

Res.	Record	Opponent	Method	Event	Date	Round	Time	Location	Notes
Loss	0–2	Mairon Santos	Decision (unanimous)	The Ultimate Fighter: Team Grasso vs. Team Shevchenko	April 9, 2024	3	5:00	Las Vegas, Nevada, United States	The Ultimate Fighter 32 Semi-final round. replacement for an injured Žygimantas Ramaška
Loss	0–1	Roedie Roets	Decision (unanimous)	The Ultimate Fighter: Team Grasso vs. Team Shevchenko	March 20, 2024	3	5:00	Las Vegas, Nevada, United States	The Ultimate Fighter 32 Quarterfinal round.
