= 2019 in Ultimate Warrior Challenge Mexico =

Information
- First date: August 24, 2019
- Last date: October 23, 2019

Events
- Total events: 2

Fights
- Total fights: 15
- Title fights: 3

The year 2019 was the eight year in the history of Ultimate Warrior Challenge Mexico, a mixed martial arts promotion based in Mexico. In these year, UWC held 2 event and marked the return of activities after a period without holding events.

== Events list ==
#	Event	Date	Venue	Location
1	UWC Mexico 20: Legacy	August 24, 2019	Auditorio Municipal de Tijuana	Tijuana, Mexico
1	UWC Mexico: New Blood 3	October 23, 2019	Colegio de Ingenieros Civiles (CICTAC)	Tijuana, Mexico

== UWC Mexico 20: Legacy ==
UWC Mexico 20: Legacy
- Promotion: Ultimate Warrior Challenge Mexico
- Date: August 24, 2019
- City: Tijuana, Mexico

Event chronology
UWC Mexico 14: Bravo vs. Suruy	UWC Mexico 20: Legacy	UWC Mexico: New Blood 3

UWC Mexico 20: Legacy was a mixed martial arts event held by Ultimate Warrior Challenge Mexico on August 24, 2019, at the Auditorio Municipal de Tijuana in Tijuana, Mexico.

=== Background ===
The main event featured a UWC Lightweight Championship fight between Akbarh Arreola and Gammaliel Escarrega.

The co-main event was a UWC Bantamweight Championship fight between Antonio Duarte and Erik Radleim.

Additionally, French Antonio Hidrio and Ivan Lopez faced off for the UWC Flyweight Championship, with Hidrio making history as the first foreign fighter to compete in a title bout in Mexico.

=== Results ===
Main card
Weight class				Method	Round	Time	Notes
Welterweight	Akbarh Arreola	def.	Gammaliel Escarrega	Submission (heel hook)	1	3:41	(Note: For the UWC Lightweight Championship)
Bantamweight	Antonio Duarte	def.	Erik Radleim	Submission (rear-naked choke)	2	3:13	(Note: For the UWC Bantamweight Championship)
Flyweight	Antoine Hidrio	def.	Iván López	KO (ground & pound)	3	4:50	(Note: For the UWC Flyweight Championship)
Lightweight	Edgar Escarrega	def.	Alex Sánchez	Decision (unanimous)	5	5:00
Featherweight	Luis Meraz	def.	Janz Fuentes	Submission (Guillotine Choke)	1	3:35
Featherweight	Alejandro Corrales	def.	Edgar Vera	Decision (unanimous)	3	5:00
Featherweight	Genaro Valdez	def.	Allan Bautista	Submission (rear-naked choke)	1	0:51
Featherweight	Arjuna Arreola	def.	Roberto Davidson	Decision (majority)	3	5:00

== UWC Mexico: New Blood 3 ==
UWC Mexico: New Blood 3
- Promotion: Ultimate Warrior Challenge Mexico
- Date: October 23, 2019
- Venue: Colegio de Ingenieros Civiles (CICTAC)
- City: Tijuana, Mexico

Event chronology
UWC Mexico 20: Legacy	UWC Mexico: New Blood 3	UWC Mexico 21: Bloody Valentine Part Deux

UWC Mexico: New Blood 3 was a mixed martial arts event held by Ultimate Warrior Challenge Mexico on October 23, 2019, at the Colegio de Ingenieros Civiles (CICTAC) in Tijuana, Mexico.

=== Background ===
A bantamweight fight between Fabían Rodríguez and Aldo Villa headlined the event.

=== Results ===
Main card
Weight class				Method	Round	Time	Notes
Bantamweight	Aldo Villa	def.	Fabián Rodríguez	Decision (unanimous)	3	5:00
Bantamweight	Jonathan Linares	def.	Saul Alfredo López	Decision (majority)	3	3:00
Middleweight	Esteban Vallejo	def.	Bernando Vázquez	Submission (rear-naked choke)	2	1:33
Bantamweight	Joel Robles	def.	Alejandro Navarro	Decision (unanimous)	3	3:00
Flyweight	Janeth Rangel	def.	Stefany Díaz	Decision (split)	3	3:00
Featherweight	Javier Díaz	def.	Fernando Velázquez	Submission (guillotine choke)	1	1:25
Strawweight	David Ibarra	def.	Gabriel Tinajero	Submission (armbar)	2	1:05
