= 2013 in Ultimate Warrior Challenge Mexico =

Information
- First date: March 2, 2013
- Last date: April 28, 2013

Events
- Total events: 2

Fights
- Total fights: 14
- Title fights: 3

The year 2013 was the five year in the history of Ultimate Warrior Challenge Mexico, a mixed martial arts promotion based in Mexico. In these year, UWC held 2 events.

== Events list ==
#	Event	Date	Venue	Location
1	UWC Mexico 13: Benítez vs. Oropeza	March 2, 2013	Auditorio Fausto Gutiérrez Moreno	Tijuana, Mexico
2	UWC Mexico: New Blood 2	April 28, 2013	ONIXEUS	Tijuana, Mexico

== UWC Mexico 13: Benítez vs. Oropeza ==
UWC Mexico 13: Benítez vs. Oropeza
- Promotion: Ultimate Warrior Challenge Mexico
- Date: March 2, 2013
- Venue: Auditorio Fausto Gutiérrez Moreno
- City: Tijuana, Mexico

Event chronology
UWC Mexico 12: Never Tap	UWC Mexico 13: Benítez vs. Oropeza	UWC México: New Blood 2

UWC Mexico 13: Benítez vs. Oropeza was a mixed martial arts event held by Ultimate Warrior Challenge Mexico on March 2, 2013, at the Auditorio Fausto Gutiérrez Moreno in Tijuana, Mexico.

=== Background ===
A welterweight fight between Rigo Oropeza and Gabriel Benítez headlined the event.

This event also featured two titles bouts: Jesus Sanchez vs. Christopher Ortega for the UWC Welterweight Championship and Antonio Barajas vs. Brady Harrison for the UWC Bantamweight Championship.

=== Results ===
Main card
Weight class				Method	Round	Time	Notes
Welterweight	Rigo Oropeza	def.	Gabriel Benítez	Submission (guillotine choke)	1	0:19
Welterweight	Jesús Sánchez	def.	Christopher Ortega	TKO (punches)	1	2:37	(Note: For the UWC Welterweight Championship)
Bantamweight	Antonio Barajas	def.	Brady Harrison	TKO (elbow injury)	1	4:47	(Note: For the UWC Bantamweight Championship)
Lightweight	Akbarh Arreola	def.	Juan Voelker	Submission (triangle choke)	1	3:04
Featherweight	Iván López	def.	Kevin Amador	Decision (unanimous)	3	5:00
Welterweight	Rogelio Melgoza	def.	Fabián Quintanar	Decision (split)	3	5:00
Lightweight	Alaín González	def.	Cesar Carrasco	TKO (injury)	3	0:38
Bantamweight	Martin Bravo	def.	Victor Borrayo	Submission (armbar)	1	1:43

== UWC Mexico: New Blood 2 ==
UWC Mexico: New Blood 2
- Promotion: Ultimate Warrior Challenge Mexico
- Date: April 28, 2013
- Venue: ONIXEUS
- City: Tijuana, Mexico

Event chronology
UWC México: Benítez vs. Oropeza	UWC Mexico: New Blood 2	UWC & EVT: Duarte vs. Beristaín

UWC Mexico: New Blood 2 was a mixed martial arts event held by Ultimate Warrior Challenge Mexico on April 28, 2013, at the ONIXEUS in Tijuana, Mexico.

=== Background ===
The main event featured a UWC Bantamweight Championship fight between champion Antonio Barajas and Cristian Jiménez.

=== Results ===
Main card
Weight class				Method	Round	Time	Notes
Bantamweight	Antonio Barajas	vs.	Cristian Jiménez	Draw (Split)	5	5:00	(Note: For the UWC Bantamweight Championship)
Flyweight	Adrián Lozano	def.	Alejandro Rodríguez	Submission (guillotine choke)	3	1:44
Lightweight	José Ruetas Soto	def.	Andrew Lazo	Submission (triangle choke)	1	1:54
Lightweight	José Zamorano	def.	Kenny Wyckoff	TKO (punches)	2	1:58
Bantamweight	Martin Bravo	def.	Eduardo García	Decision (unanimous)	3	5:00
Bantamweight	Juan Rayo	def.	Édgar Aválos	TKO (punches)	1	3:39
