= Akbarh Arreola =

Mexican mixed martial arts fighter

- Born: Akbarh Omar Arreola Jiménez; January 14, 1983 (age 43); Tijuana, Baja California, Mexico
- Other names: El Caballero
- Height: 5 ft 10 in (1.78 m)
- Weight: 155 lb (70 kg)
- Division: Lightweight; Welterweight
- Fighting out of: Chula Vista, California, United States
- Team: Entram Gym
- Rank: Black belt in Brazilian Jiu-Jitsu under Dean Lister; Green belt in Kenpo Karate
- Years active: 2002–present

Mixed martial arts record
- Total: 39
- Wins: 27
- By knockout: 5
- By submission: 21
- By decision: 1
- Losses: 11
- By knockout: 7
- By decision: 4
- Draws: 1

Other information
- Children: 1 (Jaume Arreola)
- Mixed martial arts record from Sherdog

Akbarh Omar Arreola Jiménez (born January 14, 1983) is a Mexican mixed martial artist who competed in the Lightweight division of the Ultimate Fighting Championship. He also had competed in the Welterweight division.

== Mixed martial arts career ==
=== Ultimate Warrior Challenge Mexico ===
Arreola was scheduled to face Adam Lehman in a fight to crown the first UWC welterweight champion. The fight took place at UWC Mexico 2 on May 30, 2009, where Arreola submitted Lehman with a triangle choke in just 49 seconds to become the champion.

In his first title defense, Arreola faced Matt Lagler on April 24, 2010, at UWC Mexico 6. He won the fight via second-round submission. Arreola faced Jorge López on October 16, 2010, at UWC Mexico 8. He won the fight via second-round TKO, retaining his title.

=== The Ultimate Fighter ===
In February 2012, it was revealed that Arreola would be a participant on The Ultimate Fighter 15. He was defeated in the entry round by Myles Jury via unanimous decision.

=== Ultimate Fighting Championship ===
Arreola made his promotional debut against Tiago Trator on July 26, 2014, at UFC on Fox 12. He lost the fight via unanimous decision.

In his second UFC fight, Arreola faced Yves Edwards on November 22, 2014, at UFC Fight Night 57. He won the fight via submission in the first round.

Arreola faced Francisco Trinaldo on March 21, 2015, at UFC Fight Night 62. He lost the fight via unanimous decision.

Arreola is faced Jake Matthews on November 15, 2015, at UFC 193. He lost the fight via TKO (doctor stoppage) after the second round and was subsequently released from the promotion following the loss.

On April 26, 2016, Arreola announced his retirement from mixed martial arts.

== Championships and accomplishments ==
=== Mixed martial arts ===
- Maximum Cage Fighting
  - MMAX Fights Welterweight Championship (One time)
- Ultimate Warrior Challenge Mexico
  - UWC Welterweight Championship (One time)
  - UWC Lightweight Championship (One time)

== Mixed martial arts record ==
Professional record breakdown
39 matches	27 wins	11 losses
By knockout	5	7
By submission	21	0
By decision	1	4
Draws	1	

Res.	Record	Opponent	Method	Event	Date	Round	Time	Location	Notes
Win	27–11–1	Román Córdova	Submission (armbar)	UWC Mexico 57	March 22, 2026	1	1:06	Tijuana, Mexico	Return to Welterweight.
Win	26–11–1	Walter Luna	Submission (armbar)	UWC Mexico 35	June 24, 2022	1	2:16	Tijuana, Mexico	Catchweight (175 lb) bout.
Win	25–11–1	Gammaliel Escarrega	Submission (heel hook)	UWC Mexico 20	August 24, 2019	1	3:41	Tijuana, Mexico	Won the vacant UWC Lightweight Championship.
Loss	24–11–1	Kazuki Tokudome	TKO (punches)	Pancrase 277	April 24, 2016	1	4:59	Tokyo, Japan	For the Pancrase Lightweight Championship.
Loss	24–10–1	Jake Matthews	TKO (doctor stoppage)	UFC 193	November 15, 2015	2	5:00	Melbourne, Australia	
Loss	24–9–1	Francisco Trinaldo	Decision (unanimous)	UFC Fight Night: Maia vs. LaFlare	March 21, 2015	3	5:00	Rio de Janeiro, Brazil	
Win	24–8–1	Yves Edwards	Submission (armbar)	UFC Fight Night: Edgar vs. Swanson	November 22, 2014	1	1:52	Austin, Texas, United States	
Loss	23–8–1	Tiago Trator	Decision (unanimous)	UFC on Fox: Lawler vs. Brown	July 26, 2014	3	5:00	San Jose, California, United States	
Win	23–7–1	Alejandro Solano Rodriguez	Submission (rear-naked choke)	Costa Rica MMA 1	March 22, 2014	2	1:42	Heredia, Costa Rica	
Win	22–7–1	Jason Meaders	Submission (armbar)	Submission MMA 3	September 7, 2013	1	1:06	Ontario, California, United States	Welterweight bout.
Win	21–7–1	Juan Voelker	Submission (armbar)	UWC Mexico 13	March 2, 2013	1	3:04	Tijuana, Mexico	
Loss	20–7–1	Juan Manuel Puig	TKO (punches)	Xtreme Kombat 17	September 21, 2012	1	4:46	Mexico City, Mexico	
Loss	20–6–1	Ronys Torres	Decision (unanimous)	Shooto Brasil 25	August 25, 2011	3	5:00	Rio de Janeiro, Brazil	
Win	20–5–1	Gilberto Aguilar	Submission (triangle choke)	UWC Mexico 10	June 25, 2011	1	1:25	Tijuana, Mexico	Return to Lightweight.
Win	19–5–1	Carlos Torres	KO (knees)	UWC Mexico 9	March 26, 2011	1	2:34	Tijuana, Mexico	Catchweight (160 lb) bout.
Win	18–5–1	Jorge Alberto Bustamante	TKO (punches)	UWC Mexico 8	October 16, 2010	2	4:47	Tijuana, Mexico	Defended the UWC Welterweight Championship.
Win	17–5–1	Matt Lagler	Submission (armbar)	UWC Mexico 6	April 24, 2010	2	4:07	Tijuana, Mexico	
Loss	16–5–1	Brent Weedman	TKO (punches)	MMA Xtreme 23	August 15, 2009	2	0:42	Cancun, Mexico	
Win	16–4–1	Adam Lehman	Submission (triangle Choke)	UWC Mexico 2	May 30, 2009	1	0:49	Tijuana, Mexico	Won the inaugural UWC Welterweight Championship.
Win	15–4–1	Luciano Correa	TKO (corner stoppage)	MMA Xtreme 21	April 19, 2008	2	5:00	Mexico City, Mexico	
Win	14–4–1	David Gardner	Decision (split)	MMA Xtreme 18	January 26, 2008	3	5:00	Tijuana, Mexico	
Win	13–4–1	Gabe Ruediger	Submission (kimura)	MMA Xtreme 15	November 16, 2007	1	2:03	Mexico City, Mexico	
Win	12–4–1	Mike Tseng	Submission (triangle choke)	MMA Xtreme 12	June 30, 2007	1	1:43	Mexicali, Mexico	
Win	11–4–1	Marquis McKnight	Submission (armbar)	MMA Xtreme 9	March 3, 2007	1	0:00	Tijuana, Mexico	Defended the MMA Xtreme Welterweight Championship.
Win	10–4–1	Lucas Factor	Submission (armbar)	MMA Xtreme 7	November 11, 2006	1	N/A	Tijuana, Mexico	Defended the MMA Xtreme Welterweight Championship.
Win	9–4–1	Jose Luis Cocafuego	Submission (triangle Choke)	MMA Xtreme 6	October 27, 2006	1	0:00	Tijuana, Mexico	
Win	8–4–1	Hajime Ohara	Submission (armbar)	MMA Xtreme 4	August 19, 2006	1	0:30	Tijuana, Mexico	Defended the MMA Xtreme Welterweight Championship.
Win	7–4–1	Hajime Ohara	Technical Submission (rear-naked choke)	MMA Xtreme 3	June 3, 2006	1	0:25	Tijuana, Mexico	Defended the MMA Xtreme Welterweight Championship.
Win	6–4–1	Jude Gonzales	Submission (triangle Choke)	MMA Xtreme 1	March 25, 2006	1	0:41	Tijuana, Mexico	Won the inaugural MMA Xtreme Welterweight Championship.
Loss	5–4–1	Toby Imada	Decision (unanimous)	Total Combat 12	December 17, 2005	3	5:00	Tijuana, Mexico	Welterweight debut.
Loss	5–3–1	Toby Imada	TKO (corner stoppage)	Total Combat 9	July 30, 2005	2	5:00	Tijuana, Mexico	
Draw	5–2–1	Antonio McKee	Draw	Crown Fighting 1	September 4, 2004	2	5:00	Rosarito Beach, Mexico	
Loss	5–2	Mac Danzig	TKO (punches)	Reto Maximo 5	June 27, 2004	1	1:22	Tijuana, Mexico	
Win	5–1	Steve Barnett	Submission (triangle Choke)	Total Combat 3	May 30, 2004	1	0:50	Tijuana, Mexico	
Win	4–1	Alex Ramirez	Submission (triangle Choke)	Reto Maximo 4	September 14, 2003	2	3:22	Tijuana, Mexico	
Win	3–1	Angel Santibanez	Submission (kimura)	Extreme International Evolution	August 2, 2003	1	1:02	Ensenada, Mexico	
Win	2–1	Hector Carrillo	Submission (triangle choke)	Reto Maximo 3	March 14, 2003	1	1:07	Tijuana, Mexico	
Win	1–1	Fernando Zatarain	KO	Reto Maximo 2	December 8, 2002	1	0:14	Tijuana, Mexico	
Loss	0–1	Ricardo Corrales	TKO (corner toppage)	Reto Maximo 1	September 8, 2002	1	5:00	Tijuana, Mexico	Lightweight debut.

== See also ==
- List of male mixed martial artists
- List of Mexican UFC fighters
