= 2025 in Ultimate Warrior Challenge Mexico =

Information
- First date: February 23, 2025
- Last date: April 6, 2025

Events
- Total events: 2

Fights
- Total fights: 14

The year 2025 was the 14th year in the history of Ultimate Warrior Challenge Mexico, a mixed martial arts promotion based in Mexico. UWC held a total of 2 events in 2025.

== Events list ==
#	Event	Date	Venue	Location
1	UWC Mexico 55: Martinez vs. Segura	February 23, 2025	Auditorio Fausto Gutiérrez Moreno	Tijuana, Mexico
2	UWC Mexico 56: Leyva vs. Chávez	April 6, 2025	Auditorio Municipal de Tijuana	Tijuana, Mexico

== UWC Mexico 55: Martinez vs. Segura ==
UWC Mexico 55: Martinez vs. Segura
- Promotion: Ultimate Warrior Challenge Mexico
- Date: February 23, 2025
- Venue: Auditorio Fausto Gutiérrez Moreno
- City: Tijuana, Mexico

Event chronology
UWC Mexico 54: Gordillo vs. López	UWC Mexico 55: Martinez vs. Segura	UWC Mexico 56: Leyva vs. Chávez

UWC Mexico 55: Martinez vs. Segura was a mixed martial arts event held by Ultimate Warrior Challenge Mexico on February 23, 2025, at the Auditorio Fausto Gutiérrez Moreno in Tijuana, Mexico.

=== Background ===
A flyweight fight between Osvaldo Segura and the undefeated Alan Martinez headlined the event.

A fight between Sandra Lavado and Fernanda Muñoz for the inaugural UWC Women's Flyweight Championship was canceled due to Lavado's health issues. Although the UWC assigned Muñoz another opponent, Sandra Chimeyo, it was decided that the fight would not be for any title.

=== Results ===
Main card
Weight class				Method	Round	Time	Notes
Women's Bantamweight	Fernanda Muñoz	def.	Sandra Chimeyo	TKO (punches)	1	2:35
Flyweight	Alan Martínez	def.	Osvaldo Segura	Decision (split)	3	5:00
Bantamweight	Juan Pablo González	def.	Jesús Garnica	TKO (punches)	2	3:14
Catchweight (180 lb)	Alexis Miranda	def.	Román Córdova	Decision (unanimous)	3	5:00
Flyweight	Gabriel Urbino	def.	Diego Silva	Submission (armbar)	2	4:19
Lightweight	Salvador Hernández	def.	José de la Cruz	Submission (armbar)	2	1:59
Catchweight (160 lb)	Cesar Abad	def.	Jesús Martínez	TKO (punches)	1	2:27

== UWC Mexico 56: Leyva vs. Chávez ==
UWC Mexico 56: Leyva vs. Chávez
- Promotion: Ultimate Warrior Challenge Mexico
- Date: April 6, 2025
- Venue: Auditorio Municipal
- City: Tijuana, Mexico

Event chronology
UWC Mexico 55: Martinez vs. Segura	UWC Mexico 56: Leyva vs. Chávez	UWC Mexico 57: Miranda vs. Chávez

UWC Mexico 56: Leyva vs. Chávez was a mixed martial arts event held by Ultimate Warrior Challenge Mexico on April 6, 2025, at the Auditorio Municipal de Tijuana in Tijuana, Mexico.

=== Background ===
For this event, it was planned that Nayib López would put the UWC Middleweight Championship on the line against Olympic medalist undefeated Alfonso Leyva, but the fight was canceled due to López's illness. Instead, a flyweight bout between Leyva himself and Ricardo Chávez Villaseñor headlined the event.

=== Results ===
Main card
Weight class				Method	Round	Time	Notes
Catchweight (203 lb)	Alfonso Leyva	def.	Ricardo Chávez Villaseñor	Decision (unanimous)	3	5:00
Bantamweight	Johnny Muñoz Jr.	def.	Luis Duván Rincón	Decision (unanimous)	3	5:00
Bantamweight	Juan Pablo González	def.	Ricardo Ramírez	TKO (punches)	3	4:43
Lightweight	Ilay Barzilay	def.	Héctor Icedo	TKO (punches)	1	1:09
Bantamweight	Brandon González	def.	José Peñaloza	TKO (punches)	1	4:03
Flyweight	Agapito Orozco	def.	Alex Sánchez Moreno	TKO (punches)	3	3:38
Featherweight	Ángel Ruíz	def.	Gustavo Maldonado	Submission (rear-naked choke)	1	2:08
