= 2015 in Ultimate Warrior Challenge Mexico =

Information
- First date: June 27, 2015
- Last date: June 27, 2015

Events
- Total events: 1

Fights
- Total fights: 12

The year 2015 was the seven year in the history of Ultimate Warrior Challenge Mexico, a mixed martial arts promotion based in Mexico. In these year, UWC held 1 event.

It was UWC's last year before they ceased their sporting activities for no apparent reason. The promotion returned in August 2019, with the UWC Mexico 20: Legacy event.

== Events list ==
#	Event	Date	Venue	Location
1	UWC Mexico 14: Bravo vs. Suruy	June 27, 2015	ONIXEUS	Tijuana, Mexico

== UWC Mexico 14: Bravo vs. Suruy ==
UWC Mexico 14: Bravo vs. Suruy
- Promotion: Ultimate Warrior Challenge Mexico
- Date: June 27, 2015
- Venue: ONIXEUS
- City: Tijuana, Mexico

Event chronology
UWC & EVT: Sánchez vs. Castillo	UWC Mexico 14: Bravo vs. Suruy	UWC Mexico 20: Legacy

UWC Mexico 14: Bravo vs. Suruy was a mixed martial arts event held by Ultimate Warrior Challenge Mexico on March 2, 2013, at the ONISEXUS in Tijuana, Mexico.

=== Background ===
A bantamweight fight between Martin Bravo and David Suruy headlined the event.

=== Results ===
Main card
Weight class				Method	Round	Time	Notes
Bantamweight	Martin Bravo	def.	David Suruy	Submission (rear-naked choke)	1	2:00
Heavyweight	Alejandro Orejel	def.	Mario Muñoz	TKO (corner stoppage)	1	5:00
Lightweight	Pablo Sabori	def.	Mark Anderson	TKO (punches)	1	4:18
Bantamweight	José Alday	def.	Héctor Valenzuela	Decision (unanimous)	3	5:00
Bantamweight	Cristian Quiñónez	def.	Agustín Alamillo	TKO (punches)	2	2:13
Lightweight	Marco Vázquez	def.	Leonel Padilla	Submission (rear-naked choke)	1	3:19
Flyweight	Alexander Abad	def.	Chris Saudedo	Submission (rear-naked choke)	1	3:16
Catchweight	Adan Sánchez	def.	Esteban Lemus	Submission	2	N/A
Catchweight	Saúl Cabrera	def.	Iván Vásquez	TKO	1	N/A
Catchweight	Ángel Torres	def.	Luis Suazo	Decision (unanimous)	3	N/A
Catchweight	Manuel Tapía	def.	Edward Licona	TKO	2	N/A
Catchweight	Isaac Villegas	def.	Juan Echeverria	Submission	1	N/A
