= 2010 in Ultimate Warrior Challenge Mexico =

Information
- First date: February 13, 2010
- Last date: October 16, 2010

Events
- Total events: 4

Fights
- Total fights: 37
- Title fights: 4

The year 2010 was the second year in the history of Ultimate Warrior Challenge Mexico, a mixed martial arts promotion based in Mexico. As in the previous year, all UWC events in 2010 were held at the Auditorio Fausto Gutiérrez Moreno in Tijuana. In these year, held 4 events.

== Events list ==
| # | Event | Date | Venue | Location |
|---|---|---|---|---|
| 1 | UWC Mexico 5: Bloody Valentine | February 13, 2010 | Auditorio Fausto Gutiérrez Moreno | Tijuana, Mexico |
| 2 | UWC Mexico 6: Hecho en México | April 24, 2010 | Auditorio Fausto Gutiérrez Moreno | Tijuana, Mexico |
| 3 | UWC Mexico 7: Evolution | June 26, 2010 | Auditorio Fausto Gutiérrez Moreno | Tijuana, Mexico |
| 4 | WC Mexico 8: Mexican Championships | October 16, 2010 | Auditorio Fausto Gutiérrez Moreno | Tijuana, Mexico |

== UWC Mexico 5: Bloody Valentine ==
UWC Mexico 5: Bloody Valentine
- Promotion: Ultimate Warrior Challenge Mexico
- Date: February 13, 2010
- Venue: Auditorio Fausto Gutiérrez Moreno
- City: Tijuana, Mexico

Event chronology
| UWC Mexico 4: Renacimiento | UWC Mexico 5: Bloody Valentine | UWC Mexico 6: Hecho en Mexico |

UWC Mexico 5: Bloody Valentine was a mixed martial arts event held by Ultimate Warrior Challenge Mexico on May 13, 2010, at the Auditorio Fausto Gutiérrez Moreno in Tijuana, Mexico.

=== Background ===
The main event featured a UWC Welterweight Championship fight between champion Gabriel Benítez and Manuel Ramos Gallareta.

=== Results ===
Main card
| Weight class | | | | Method | Round | Time | Notes |
|---|---|---|---|---|---|---|---|
| Featherweight | Gabriel Benítez | def. | Manuel Ramos Gallareta | Submission (kimura) | 1 | 1:20 | (Note: For the UWC Featherweight Championship) |
| Light Heavyweight | Brett Albee | def. | Omar Jiménez | Submission (kimura) | 1 | 2:55 |
| Featherweight | Alex Soto | def. | Henry Briones | Decision (split) | 3 | 5:00 |
| Welterweight | Fabián Quintanar | def. | Kyle Olsen | TKO (punches) | 1 | 1:15 |
| Middleweight | Matt Lagler | def. | Jesús Sánchez | Submission (guillotine choke) | 1 | 0:28 |
| Flyweight | Christina Marks | def. | Celeste Saenz | TKO (injury) | 1 | 3:00 |
| Welterweight | Gabriel Medina | def. | Josh Taylor | TKO (punches) | 1 | 1:43 |
| Lightweight | Brady Harrison | def. | Ismael Vasquez Segura | TKO (punches) | 3 | 2:33 |
| Featherweight | Cristian Jiménez | def. | Antonio Barajas | Decision (unanimous) | 3 | 5:00 |
| Featherweight | Seth Humpries | def. | Carlos Resendíz | Decision (unanimous) | 3 | 5:00 |

== UWC Mexico 6: Hecho en Mexico ==
UWC Mexico 6: Hecho en Mexico
- Promotion: Ultimate Warrior Challenge Mexico
- Date: April 24, 2010
- Venue: Auditorio Fausto Gutiérrez Moreno
- City: Tijuana, Mexico

Event chronology
| UWC Mexico 5: Bloody Valentine | UWC Mexico 6: Hecho en Mexico | UWC Mexico 7: Evolution |

UWC Mexico 6: Hecho en Mexico was a mixed martial arts event held by Ultimate Warrior Challenge Mexico on April 24, 2010, at the Auditorio Fausto Gutiérrez Moreno in Tijuana, Mexico.

=== Background ===
The main event featured a UWC Featherweight Championship fight between champion Akbarh Arreola and Matt Lagler.

The co-main event was a UWC Lightweight Championship fight between Alex Soto and Rafael Salomão.

=== Results ===
Main card
| Weight class | | | | Method | Round | Time | Notes |
|---|---|---|---|---|---|---|---|
| Welterweight | Akbarh Arreola (c) | def. | Matt Lagler | Submission (armbar) | 2 | 4:07 | (Note: For the UWC Welterweight Championship) |
| Bantamweight | Alex Soto | def. | Rafael Salomão | TKO (punches) | 1 | 4:58 | (Note: For the UWC Bantamweight Championship) |
| Lightweight | Manuel Ramos Gallareta | def. | Tito Castro | Decision (unanimous) | 3 | 5:00 |
| Catchweight (140 lb) | Brady Harrison | def. | José Guardado | Submission (rear-naked choke) | 1 | 2:37 |
| Lightweight | Eduardo Espinoza | def. | Juan Manuel Torres | TKO (corner stoppage) | 2 | 5:00 |
| Welterweight | Guillermo Smith | def. | Gabriel Medina | Submission (armbar) | 1 | 0:55 |
| Catchweight (195 lb) | Isaac Quintero | def. | Leonard Smith | KO (punches) | 2 | 0:34 |
| Lightweight | Masio Fullen | def. | Ulises Briones | Decision (unanimous) | 3 | 5:00 |
| Heavyweight | Cristian Jiménez | def. | Kisack Monroy | Submission (kimura) | 2 | 1:21 |
| Catchweight (150 lb) | Jaime Flores | def. | Seth Humpries | Submission (kimura) | 1 | 4:29 |

== UWC Mexico 7: Evolution ==
UWC Mexico 7: Evolution
- Promotion: Ultimate Warrior Challenge Mexico
- Date: June 26, 2010
- Venue: Auditorio Fausto Gutiérrez Moreno
- City: Tijuana, Mexico

Event chronology
| UWC Mexico 6: Hecho en Mexico | UWC Mexico 7: Evolution | UWC Mexico 8: Mexican Championships |

UWC Mexico 7: Evolution was a mixed martial arts event held by Ultimate Warrior Challenge Mexico on June 26, 2010, at the Auditorio Fausto Gutiérrez Moreno in Tijuana, Mexico.

=== Background ===
A lightweight fight between Mike De La Torre and Fabián Quintanar headlined the event.

=== Results ===
Main card
| Weight class | | | | Method | Round | Time | Notes |
|---|---|---|---|---|---|---|---|
| Lightweight | Mike De La Torre | def. | Fabián Quintanar | TKO (elbows) | 2 | 3:42 |
| Light Heavyweight | Matt Lagler | def. | Israel Quintero | Submission (armbar) | 1 | 4:59 |
| Lightweight | Eduardo Espinoza | def. | Masio Fullen | Decision (unanimous) | 3 | 5:00 |
| Bantamweight | Walel Watson | def. | Cristian Jiménez | Submission (triangle armbar) | 2 | 2:26 |
| Middleweight | Liz Carmouche | def. | Margarita de la Cruz | TKO (doctor stoppage) | 2 | 5:00 |
| Featherweight | Marco Bonilla | def. | Luis García | Submission (triangle choke) | 1 | 2:07 |
| Bantamweight | Sergio Hernández | def. | Fernando Figueroa | Submission (armbar) | 1 | 4:02 |
| Bantamweight | Enrique Vera | def. | Armando Silvestre | Submission (armbar) | 2 | 1:09 |

== UWC Mexico 8: Mexican Championships ==
UWC Mexico 8: Mexican Championships
- Promotion: Ultimate Warrior Challenge Mexico
- Date: October 16, 2010
- Venue: Auditorio Fausto Gutiérrez Moreno
- City: Tijuana, Mexico

Event chronology
| UWC Mexico 7: Evolution | UWC Mexico 8: Mexican Championships | UWC México 9: They're Back |

UWC Mexico 8: Mexican Championships was a mixed martial arts event held by Ultimate Warrior Challenge Mexico on October 16, 2010, at the Auditorio Fausto Gutiérrez Moreno in Tijuana, Mexico.

=== Background ===
The main event featured a UWC Welterweight Championship fight between champion Akbarh Arreola and Jorge Alberto Bustamante.

The co-main event was a UWC Featherweight Championship fight between Landon Piercy and Antonio Duarte.

=== Results ===
Main card
| Weight class | | | | Method | Round | Time | Notes |
|---|---|---|---|---|---|---|---|
| Welterweight | Akbarh Arreola (c) | def. | Jorge Alberto Bustamante | TKO (punches) | 2 | 4:47 | (Note: For the UWC Welterweight Championship) |
| Featherweight | Landon Piercy | def. | Antonio Duarte | TKO (punches) | 3 | 2:01 | (Note: For the UWC Featherweight Championship) |
| Featherweight | Walel Watson | def. | Manuel Ramos Gallareta | Submission (guillotine choke) | 1 | 0:43 |
| Heavyweight | Leonard Smith | def. | Aldo Aguila | TKO (punches) | 2 | 0:29 |
| Lightweight | Eduardo Espinoza | def. | Miguel Enrique Torres | Submission (rear-naked choke) | 2 | 2:17 |
| Featherweight | Brady Harrison | def. | Ismael Vasquez Segura | Submission (rear-naked choke) | 3 | 2:03 |
| Featherweight | Kevin Amador | def. | Seth Humpries | Submission (armbar) | 1 | 1:31 |
| Lightweight | Antonio Barajas | def. | Matthew Jordan | Submission (rear-naked choke) | 2 | 2:35 |
| Featherweight | Fernando Figueroa | def. | Joseph Parra | Submission (rear-naked choke) | 1 | 1:52 |
