= 2011 in Ultimate Warrior Challenge Mexico =

Information
- First date: March 25, 2011
- Last date: October 1, 2011

Events
- Total events: 4

Fights
- Total fights: 30
- Title fights: 4

The year 2011 was the third year in the history of Ultimate Warrior Challenge Mexico, a mixed martial arts promotion based in Mexico. In these year, UWC held 4 events.

== Events list ==
#	Event	Date	Venue	Location
1	UWC Mexico 9: They're Back	March 25, 2011	Auditorio Fausto Gutiérrez Moreno	Tijuana, Mexico
2	UWC Mexico 9.5: Iguana	April 30, 2011	Restaurante Iguana Rana	Tijuana, Mexico
3	UWC Mexico 10: To the Edge	June 25, 2011	Auditorio Fausto Gutiérrez Moreno	Tijuana, Mexico
4	UWC Mexico 11: Born Again	October 1, 2011	Auditorio Fausto Gutiérrez Moreno	Tijuana, Mexico

== UWC Mexico 9: They're Back ==
UWC Mexico 9: They're Back
- Promotion: Ultimate Warrior Challenge Mexico
- Date: March 25, 2011
- Venue: Auditorio Fausto Gutiérrez Moreno
- City: Tijuana, Mexico

Event chronology
UWC Mexico 8: Mexican Championships	UWC Mexico 9: They're Back	UWC Mexico 9.5: Iguana

UWC Mexico 9: They're Back was a mixed martial arts event held by Ultimate Warrior Challenge Mexico on March 25, 2011, at the Auditorio Fausto Gutiérrez Moreno in Tijuana, Mexico.

=== Background ===
The main event featured a UWC Middleweight Championship fight between Gary Padilla and David Mariscal.

The co-main event was a UWC Lightweight Championship fight between Gabriel Benítez and Raúl Bellereza.

=== Results ===
Main card
Weight class				Method	Round	Time	Notes
Middleweight	Gary Padilla	def.	David Mariscal	Decision (unanimous)	5	5:00	(Note: For the UWC Middleweight Championship)
Lightweight	Gabriel Benítez	def.	Raúl Bellereza	Submission (rear-naked choke)	1	3:29	(Note: For the UWC Lightweight Championship)
Bantamweight	Alex Soto	def.	Brady Harrison	Submission (triangle choke)	2	4:53
Catchweight (160 lb)	Akbarh Arreola	def.	Carlos Torres	KO (knees)	1	2:34
Featherweight	Danny Martínez	def.	Eduardo Espinoza	Decision (unanimous)	3	5:00
Welterweight	Jesús Sánchez	def.	Guillermo Smith	TKO (punches)	2	2:27
Heavyweight	Mario Muñoz	def.	Leonard Smith	TKO (punches)	2	4:29
Bantamweight	Ricardo Aguilar	def.	Seth Humpries	Submission (armbar)	2	2:07

== UWC Mexico 9.5: Iguana ==
UWC Mexico 9.5: Iguana
- Promotion: Ultimate Warrior Challenge Mexico
- Date: April 30, 2011
- Venue: Restaurante Iguana Rana
- City: Tijuana, Mexico

Event chronology
UWC Mexico 9: They're Back	UWC Mexico 9.5: Iguana	UWC Mexico 10: To the Edge

UWC Mexico 9.5: Iguana was a mixed martial arts event held by Ultimate Warrior Challenge Mexico on April 30, 2011, at the Restaurante Iguana Rana in Tijuana, Mexico.

=== Background ===
A heavyweight fight between Leonardo Smith and Mario Muñoz headlined the event.

The event also marked the professional fighter debut of Brandon Moreno, who later became a UFC world champion.

=== Results ===
Main card
Weight class				Method	Round	Time	Notes
Heavyweight	Leonard Smith	def.	Mario Muñoz	Decision (unanimous)	3	5:00
Lightweight	José Zamorano	def.	Sipanhya Koummalasy	Submission (rear naked choke)	2	2:30
Lightweight	Matthew Jordan	def.	Juan Voelker	Submission (armbar)	1	1:09
Featherweight	Brandon Moreno	def.	Atiq Jihad	Submission (triangle dhoke)	1	2:30

== UWC Mexico 10: To the Edge ==
UWC Mexico 10: To the Edge
- Promotion: Ultimate Warrior Challenge Mexico
- Date: June 25, 2010
- Venue: Auditorio Fausto Gutiérrez Moreno
- City: Tijuana, Mexico

Event chronology
UWC Mexico 9.5: Iguana	UWC Mexico 10: To the Edge	UWC Mexico 11: Born Again

UWC Mexico 10: To the Edge was a mixed martial arts event held by Ultimate Warrior Challenge Mexico on June 25, 2010, at the Auditorio Fausto Gutiérrez Moreno in Tijuana, Mexico.

=== Background ===
A lightweight fight between Akbarh Arreola and Gilberto Aguilar headlined the event.

=== Results ===
Main card
Weight class				Method	Round	Time	Notes
Lightweight	Akbarh Arreola	def.	Gilberto Aguilar	Submission (triangle choke)	1	1:25
Bantamweight	Walel Watson	def.	Ismael Leon	Submission (anaconda choke)	1	4:28	(Note: For the UWC Bantamweight Championship)
Middleweight	David Mariscal	def.	Omar Jiménez	Submission (front choke)	2	0:55
Featherweight	Brady Harrison	def.	Henry Briones	Decision (split)	3	5:00
Lightweight	Fabián Quintanar	def.	Raul Bellereza	Submission (armbar)	1	4:34
Featherweight	Jaime Flores	def.	Juan Voelker	DQ (illegal knee)	2	1:27
Bantamweight	Ricardo Aguilar	def.	Atiq Jihad	Decision (unanimous)	3	5:00
Bantamweight	Iván Díaz	def.	Iván Santibañez	Decision (unanimous)	3	5:00
Bantamweight	Marcos Berinstaín	def.	Brandon Moreno	Decision (inanimous)	3	5:00

== UWC Mexico 11: Born Again ==
UWC Mexico 11: Born Again
- Promotion: Ultimate Warrior Challenge Mexico
- Date: October 1, 2011
- Venue: Auditorio Fausto Gutiérrez Moreno
- City: Tijuana, Mexico

Event chronology
UWC Mexico 10: To the Edge	UWC Mexico 11: Born Again	UWC México: New Blood 1

UWC Mexico 11: Born Again was a mixed martial arts event held by Ultimate Warrior Challenge Mexico on October 1, 2011, at the Auditorio Fausto Gutiérrez Moreno in Tijuana, Mexico.

=== Background ===
A featherweight fight between Antonio Duarte and Brady Harrison headlined the event.

=== Results ===
Main card
Weight class				Method	Round	Time	Notes
Featherweight	Antonio Duarte	def.	Brady Harrison	Decision (unanimous)	3	5:00
Welterweight	Jesús Sánchez	def.	Christopher Ortega	Submission (kneebar)	1	4:23	(Note: For the UWC Welterweight Championship)
Middleweight	David Mariscal	vs.	Matt Ladger	Draw		0:00
Catchweight	Henry Briones	def.	Ismael Vásquez Segura	TKO (Punches)	1	3:34
Lightweight	Manuel Ramos Gallareta	def.	Eduardo Espinoza	Submission (rear-naked choke)	1	3:21
Lightweight	Ismael Leon	def.	Rogelio Melgoza	Submission (rear-naked choke)	3	3:57
Welterweight	Iván Castillo	def.	Dominique Chisem	Submission (rear-naked choke)	2	1:48
Bantamweight	Kevin Amador	def.	Armando Silvestre	Submission (armbar)	1	1:09
Bantamweight	Atiq Jihad	def.	Efraín Zamorano	Submission (rear-naked choke)	1	4:02
