= Ultimate Warrior Challenge Mexico =

Mixed martial arts promotion company

Ultimate Warrior Challenge México
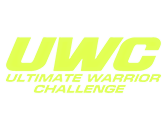
- Type: Private
- Industry: Mixed martial arts promotion
- Founded: 2009; 17 years ago
- Founder: Alejandro Islas
- Headquarters: Tijuana, Baja California, Mexico
- Website: uwc.com.mx

Ultimate Warrior Challenge Mexico (UWC Mexico) is a Mexican mixed martial arts promotion based in Tijuana, Baja California. The company was founded in 2009, making it one of the longest-running in the country.

As the longest-running MMA company in the country, UWC has produced names such as Gabriel Benítez, Raul Rosas Jr., Brandon Moreno, Henry Briones, among others.

== History ==
Founded in 2009, UWC Mexico held its first event on February 28th at the Tijuana Municipal Auditorium, titled UWC Mexico 1: Baja California vs. California, featuring talent from the Baja California Peninsula and Southern California.

On May 30th, 2009, at the UWC Mexico 2: Furia Cachanilla event, the inaugural UWC champion was revealed. In the main event, Akbarh Arreola defeated Adam Lehman in 49 seconds to become the company's welterweight champion. The aforementioned event also marked the first time a women's fight took place in the history of Mexican MMA. There, Margarita De La Cruz Ramírez and Cristina Marks, making their professional debut, faced off in a close fight, with Ramírez winning by submission in the first round.

In 2015, shortly after UWC Mexico 14, the promotion discontinued its sporting activities for unknown reasons, causing its fighters to move to other national promotions such as Xtreme Fighters Latino; some of them would later sign with LUX Fight League. Four years passed before UWC returned, with UWC Mexico 20: Legacy held on August 24, 2019.

In 2020, and due to the COVID-19 pandemic, UWC events were held in the Entram Gym starting with the UWC Mexico 22: Total War event. Despite the fading of the virus and the reopening to the public, the famous gym has established itself as one of UWC's main venues.

In 2021, UWC announced an exclusive multi-year streaming agreement with UFC Fight Pass. In January 2024, UWC CEO Alejandro Islas announced the renewal of contract with them.

== Current champions ==
Division	Upper weight limit	Champion	Since	Title Defenses
Heavyweight	120 kg (264.6 lb)	(Mexico) Jesús Navarrete	July 3, 2020 (UWC Mexico 22)	1
Middleweight	84 kg (185.2 lb)	(Mexico) Alfonso Leyva	June 7, 2026 (UWC Mexico 58)	0
Welterweight	77 kg (169.8 lb)	(Argentina) Adrián Oviedo	February 25, 2024 (UWC Mexico 51)	0
Lightweight	70 kg (154.3 lb)	(Brazil) Adriano Nunes	July 28, 2023 (UWC Mexico 46)	0
Featherweight	66 kg (145.5 lb)	(United States) Dorian Ramos	October 28, 2022 (UWC Mexico 39)	3
Bantamweight	61 kg (134.5 lb)	(Mexico) Jessie Rosas	June 7, 2026 (UWC Mexico 58)	0
Flyweight	57 kg (125.7 lb)	(Argentina) Braián González	February 24, 2023 (UWC Mexico 41)	4
Women's Strawweight	52 kg (114.6 lb)	Vacant	/	-

== UWC Mexico title history ==
=== Men's Heavyweight Championship ===
No.	Name	Event	Date	Reign (total)	Defenses
1	(Mexico) Jesús Navarrete def. Eliezer Ortega	UWC Mexico 22; Tijuana, Mexico	Jul 3, 2020		1. def. Enrique Lara at UWC Mexico 24 on Nov 24, 2020

=== Men's Middleweight Championship ===
No.	Name	Event	Date	Reign (total)	Defenses
1	(United States) Gary Padilla def. David Mariscal	UWC Mexico 9 Tijuana, Mexico	Mar 25, 2011	?	
Padilla vacated the title.
2	(Argentina) Antonio Gordillo def. Ricardo Chávez Villaseñor	UWC Mexico 45; Tijuana, Mexico	Jul 2, 2023	392	1. def. Victor de Paula at UWC Mexico 48 on Sept 23, 2023
3	(Mexico) Nayib López	UWC Mexico 34; Tijuana, Mexico	Jul 28, 2024		
López vacated the title.
4	(Mexico) Alfonso Leyva def. Thales Adriel	UWC Mexico 58; Tijuana, Mexico	Jun 7, 2026		

=== Men's Welterweight Championship ===
No.	Name	Event	Date	Reign (total)	Defenses
1	(Mexico) Akbarh Arreola def. Adam Lehman	UWC Mexico 2 Tijuana, Mexico	May 30, 2009	?	1. def. Matt Lagler at UWC Mexico 6 on Apr 24, 2010; 2. def. Jorge López at UWC Mexico 8 on Oct 16, 2010
Arreola vacated the title.
2	(Mexico) Jesús Sánchez def. Christopher Ortega	UWC Mexico 11; Tijuana, Mexico	Oct 1, 2011	1113	1. def. Christopher Ortega at UWC Mexico 13 on Mar 2, 2013
3	(Mexico) Iván Castillo	UWC & EVT: Sánchez vs. Castillo; Tijuana, Mexico	Oct 18, 2014	?	
During Castillo's reign, the title was deactivated due to the promotion's temporary closure.
4	(Mexico) Iván Castillo (2) def. Leonardo Blasco	UWC Mexico 26; Tijuana, Mexico	Apr 30, 2021	?	
Castillo vacated the title.
5	(Argentina) Adrián Oviedo def. Carlos Camargo	UWC Mexico 51; Tijuana, Mexico	Feb 25, 2024		

=== Men's Lightweight Championship ===
No.	Name	Event	Date	Reign (total)	Defenses
1	(Mexico) David Mariscal def. Miguel Pardinas	UWC Mexico 3 Tijuana, Mexico	Jul 18, 2009	?	1. def. Leobardo López Caloca at UWC Mexico 4 on Nov 29, 2009
Mariscal vacated the title and it was later deactivated due to the temporary closure of the promotion.
2	(Mexico) Akbarh Arreola def. Gammaliel Escarrega	UWC Mexico 20; Tijuana, Mexico	Aug 24, 2019	?	
Arreola vacated the title.
3	(Mexico) Edgar Escarrega def. Fabian Quintanar	UWC Mexico 21; Tijuana, Mexico	Feb 29, 2020	?	
Escarrega vacated the title.
4	(Mexico) José Luis Verdugo def. Carlos Cañada	UWC Mexico 24; Tijuana, Mexico	Nov 13, 2020	?	1. def. Alexander Barahona at UWC Mexico 26 on Apr 30, 2021
Verdugo vacated the title.
5	(Mexico) Pablo Sabori def. Ángel Rodríguez	UWC Mexico 33; Tijuana, Mexico	Apr 29, 2022	?	1. def. Alberto Sánchez at UWC Mexico 40 on Nov 25, 2022
Sabori vacated the title.
6	(Brazil) Adriano Nunes def. Marco Antonio Elpidio	UWC Mexico 46; Tijuana, Mexico	Jul 28, 2023		

=== Men's Featherweight Championship ===
No.	Name	Event	Date	Reign (total)	Defenses
1	(Mexico) Antonio Duarte def. Rafael Salomão	UWC Mexico 3 Tijuana, Mexico	Jul 18, 2009	?	1. def. Juan Manuel Torres at UWC Mexico 4 on Nov 28, 2009
Duarte vacated the title.
2	(Mexico) Gabriel Benítez def. Manuel Ramos Gallareta	UWC Mexico 5 Tijuana, Mexico	Feb 13, 2010	?	1. def. Raúl Bellereza at UWC Mexico 9 on Mar 25, 2011; 2. def. Jorge Alberto Bustamante at UWC Mexico 12 on Mar 24, 2012
During Benítez's reign, the title was deactivated due to the promotion's temporary closure.
3	(Mexico) Luis Meraz def. Miguel Enrique Torres	UWC Mexico 21; Tijuana, Mexico	Feb 29, 2020	1000	
4	(United States) Dorian Ramos	UWC Mexico 39; Tijuana, Mexico	Oct 28, 2022		1. def. Mauricio Eguiluz at UWC Mexico 41 on Feb 24, 2023; 2. def. José Peñaloza at UWC Mexico 43 on Apr 28, 2023; 3. def. Esteban Sedano at UWC Mexico 52 on Apr 7, 2024

=== Men's Bantamweight Championship ===
No.	Name	Event	Date	Reign (total)	Defenses
1	(Mexico) Alex Soto def. Rafael Salomão	UWC Mexico 6 Tijuana, Mexico	Apr 24, 2010	?	1. def. Brady Harrison at UWC Mexico 9 on Mar 25, 2011
Soto vacated the title.
2	(United States) Walel Watson def. Ismael León	UWC Mexico 10; Tijuana, Mexico	Jun 25, 2011	?	
Watson vacated the title.
3	(Mexico) Antonio Barajas def. Brady Harrison	UWC Mexico 13; Tijuana, Mexico	Mar 2, 2013	?	
Barajas vacated the title.
4	(Mexico) Antonio Duarte def. Marcos Beristain	UWC & EVT: Duarte vs. Beristaín; Tijuana, Mexico	May 17, 2014	?	
During Duarte's reign, the title was deactivated due to the promotion's temporary closure.
5	(Mexico) Antonio Duarte (2) def. Erik Radleim	UWC Mexico 20; Tijuana, Mexico	Aug 29, 2019	?	
Duarte vacated the title.
6	(Mexico) Cristian Quiñónez def. Donny Matos	UWC Mexico 25; Tijuana, Mexico	Feb 26, 2021	?	
Quiñónez vacated the title.
7	(Ecuador) Adrián Luna Martinetti def. Brandon Uruchurtu	UWC Mexico 31; Tijuana, Mexico	Feb 25, 2022	?	1. def. Juan Campos at UWC Mexico 35 on Jun 24, 2022; 2. def. Donny Matos at UWC Mexico 42 on Mar 31, 2023
Luna Martinetti vacated the title.
8	(Mexico) Mahatma García def. Juan Pablo González	UWC Mexico 50; Tijuana, Mexico	Nov 24, 2023	93	
9	(Ecuador) Adrián Luna Martinetti (2)	UWC Mexico 51; Tijuana, Mexico	Feb 25, 2024		
Martinetti vacated the title.
10	(Mexico) Jessie Rosas	UWC Mexico 58; Tijuana, Mexico	Jun 7, 2026		

=== Men's Flyweight Championship ===
No.	Name	Event	Date	Reign (total)	Defenses
1	(Mexico) Iván López def. Kevin Amador	UWC & EVT: Duarte vs. Beristaín; Tijuana, Mexico	May 17, 2014	1930	
2	(France) Antoine Hidrio	UWC Mexico 20; Tijuana, Mexico	Aug 29, 2019	184	
3	(Mexico) Jesús Santos Aguilar	UWC Mexico 21; Tijuana, Mexico	Feb 29, 2020	607	1. def. Edgar Chairez at UWC Mexico 23 on Sept 4, 2020
Aguilar vacated the title.
4	(Brazil) Sóslenis Carvalho def. Paulino Siller	UWC Mexico 29; Tijuana, Mexico	Oct 1, 2021	238	
5	(Brazil) João Camilo	UWC Mexico 34; Tijuana, Mexico	May 27, 2022	273	
6	(Brazil) Braián González	UWC Mexico 41; Tijuana, Mexico	Feb 24, 2023		

=== Women's Strawweight Championship ===
No.	Name	Event	Date	Reign (total)	Defenses
1	(Mexico) Yazmin Jauregui def. Annely Jiménez García	UWC Mexico 24; Tijuana, Mexico	Nov 13, 2020	272	
Jauregui vacated the title.

== List of events ==
#	Event	Date	Venue	Location
58	UWC Mexico 57: Miranda vs. Chávez	March 22, 2026	Arena Tecate	Tijuana, Mexico
57	UWC Mexico 56: Leyva vs. Chávez	April 6, 2025	Auditorio Municipal de Tijuana	Tijuana, Mexico
56	UWC Mexico 55: Martinez vs. Segura	February 23, 2025	Auditorio Fausto Gutiérrez Moreno	Tijuana, Mexico
55	UWC Mexico 54: Gordillo vs. López	July 28, 2024	Entram Gym	Tijuana, Mexico
54	UWC Mexico 53: Elías vs. Meza	May 19, 2024	Entram Gym	Tijuana, Mexico
53	UWC Mexico 52: Ramos vs. Sedano	April 7, 2024	Zonkeys Arena	Tijuana, Mexico
52	UWC Mexico 51: García vs. Luna	February 25, 2024	Entram Gym	Tijuana, Mexico
51	UWC Mexico 50: González vs. García	November 24, 2023	Entram Gym	Tijuana, Mexico
50	UWC Mexico 49: Oviedo vs. Zadruzynski	October 27, 2023	Entram Gym	Tijuana, Mexico
49	UWC Mexico 48: Gordillo vs. De Paula	September 29, 2023	Entram Gym	Tijuana, Mexico
48	UWC Mexico 47: El Hazoume vs. Ramos	August 25, 2023	Auditorio Municipal	Tijuana, Mexico
47	UWC Mexico 46: Elpidio vs. Nunes	July 28, 2023	Auditorio Municipal	Tijuana, Mexico
46	UWC Mexico 45: Chávez vs. Gordillo 2	July 2, 2023	Auditorio Municipal	Tijuana, Mexico
45	UWC Mexico 44: Prototipo vs. El Rey	May 26, 2023	Entram Gym	Tijuana, Mexico
44	UWC Mexico 43: Ramos vs. Peñaloza	April 28, 2023	Auditorio Municipal	Tijuana, Mexico
43	UWC Mexico 42: Luna vs. Matos	March 31, 2023	Entram Gym	Tijuana, Mexico
42	UWC Mexico 41: Mascarado vs. Prototipo	February 24, 2023	Entram Gym	Tijuana, Mexico
41	UWC Mexico 40: Sabori vs. Sánchez	November 25, 2022	Entram Gym	Tijuana, Mexico
40	UWC Mexico 39: Meráz vs. Ramos	October 28, 2022	Entram Gym	Tijuana, Mexico
39	UWC Mexico 38: Camilo vs. González	September 30, 2022	Entram Gym	Tijuana, Mexico
38	UWC Mexico 37: Sánchez vs. Granados	August 26, 2022	Entram Gym	Tijuana, Mexico
37	UWC Mexico 36: Díaz vs. García	July 29, 2022	Entram Gym	Tijuana, Mexico
36	UWC Mexico 35: Luna vs. Campos	June 24, 2022	El Foro	Tijuana, Mexico
35	UWC Mexico 34: Carvalho vs. Camilo	May 27, 2022	Entram Gym	Tijuana, Mexico
34	UWC Mexico 33: Sabori vs. Rodríguez	April 29, 2022	El Foro	Tijuana, Mexico
33	UWC Mexico 32: Sánchez vs. Valencia	March 25, 2022	Entram Gym	Tijuana, Mexico
32	UWC Mexico 31: Luna vs. Uruchurtu	February 25, 2022	Entram Gym	Tijuana, Mexico
31	UWC Mexico 30: Leyva vs. Galera	November 26, 2021	Entram Gym	Tijuana, Mexico
30	UWC Mexico 29: Meráz vs. Rivero	October 1, 2021	Entram Gym	Tijuana, Mexico
29	UWC Mexico 28: Luna vs. Benítez	August 13, 2021	Entram Gym	Tijuana, Mexico
28	UWC Mexico 27: Torres vs. Cañada	June 11, 2021	Entram Gym	Tijuana, Mexico
27	UWC Mexico 26: Verdugo vs. Barahona	April 30, 2021	Entram Gym	Tijuana, Mexico
26	UWC Mexico 25: Quinóñez vs. Matos	February 26, 2021	Entram Gym	Tijuana, Mexico
25	UWC Mexico 24: Friday the 13th	November 13, 2020	Entram Gym	Tijuana, Mexico
24	UWC Mexico 23: Supremacy	September 4, 2020	Entram Gym	Tijuana, Mexico
23	UWC Mexico 22: Total War	July 3, 2020	Entram Gym	Tijuana, Mexico
22	UWC Mexico 21: Bloody Valentine Part Deux	February 29, 2020	Auditorio Municipal	Tijuana, Mexico
21	UWC Mexico: New Blood 3	October 23, 2019	Colegio de Ingenieros Civiles (CICTAC)	Tijuana, Mexico
20	UWC Mexico 20: Legacy	August 24, 2019	Auditorio Municipal	Tijuana, Mexico
19	UWC Mexico 14: Bravo vs. Suruy	June 27, 2015	ONIXEUS	Tijuana, Mexico
18	UWC & EVT: Sánchez vs. Castillo	October 18, 2014	ONIXEUS	Tijuana, Mexico
17	UWC & EVT: Duarte vs. Beristaín	May 17, 2014	Auditorio Fausto Gutiérrez Moreno	Tijuana, Mexico
16	UWC Mexico: New Blood 2	April 28, 2013	ONIXEUS	Tijuana, Mexico
15	UWC Mexico 13: Benítez vs. Oropeza	March 2, 2013	Auditorio Fausto Gutiérrez Moreno	Tijuana, Mexico
14	UWC Mexico 12: Never Tap	March 24, 2012	Auditorio Fausto Gutiérrez Moreno	Tijuana, Mexico
13	UWC Mexico: New Blood 1	January 29, 2012	Score Sports Bar	Tijuana, Mexico
12	UWC Mexico 11: Born Again	October 1, 2011	Auditorio Fausto Gutiérrez Moreno	Tijuana, Mexico
11	UWC Mexico 10: To the Edge	June 25, 2011	Auditorio Fausto Gutiérrez Moreno	Tijuana, Mexico
10	UWC Mexico 9.5: Iguana	April 30, 2011	Restaurante Iguana Rana	Tijuana, Mexico
9	UWC Mexico 9: They're Back	March 25, 2011	Auditorio Fausto Gutiérrez Moreno	Tijuana, Mexico
8	UWC Mexico 8: Mexican Championships	October 16, 2010	Auditorio Fausto Gutiérrez Moreno	Tijuana, Mexico
7	UWC Mexico 7: Evolution	June 26, 2010	Auditorio Fausto Gutiérrez Moreno	Tijuana, Mexico
6	UWC Mexico 6: Hecho en Mexico	April 24, 2010	Auditorio Fausto Gutiérrez Moreno	Tijuana, Mexico
5	UWC Mexico 5: Bloody Valentine	February 13, 2010	Auditorio Fausto Gutiérrez Moreno	Tijuana, Mexico
4	UWC Mexico 4: Renacimiento	November 28, 2009	Auditorio Fausto Gutiérrez Moreno	Tijuana, Mexico
3	UWC Mexico 3: Tijuana vs. Brazil	July 18, 2009	Auditorio Fausto Gutiérrez Moreno	Tijuana, Mexico
2	UWC Mexico 2: Furia Cachanilla	May 30, 2009	Auditorio Fausto Gutiérrez Moreno	Tijuana, Mexico
1	UWC Mexico 1: Baja California vs. California	February 28, 2009	Auditorio Fausto Gutiérrez Moreno	Tijuana, Mexico
