= Entram Gym =

MMA training facility and team in Mexico

Entram
- Est.: 2006
- Founded by: Raúl Arvizu
- Primary trainers: Raúl Arvizu
- Training facilities: Tijuana, Baja California

Entram Gym, commonly known simply as Entram, is a mixed martial arts (MMA) and Brazilian jiu-jitsu academy and fight team based in Tijuana, Baja California, Mexico.

Founded by Raúl Arvizu in 2006, Entram has been the subject of feature coverage in Mexican and international combat-sports media for its role in the development of Mexican mixed martial artists. Entram is one of the top professional MMA training camps.

Given its location, the gym has also served as the venue for many of the events held by the Ultimate Warrior Challenge Mexico.

== Background ==
Entram was founded in Tijuana by Raúl Arvizu, a Brazilian jiu-jitsu black belt under Dean Lister. Arvizu began in karate and kung fu as a child, later specializing in judo, in which he earned a black belt. At age 18 he turned to Brazilian jiu-jitsu, and with no BJJ school then available in Tijuana, he worked to fund training in the United States and travelled to Brazil for six months of study before later earning his black belt under Lister. Arvizu also competed as a professional mixed martial artist, with media coverage citing his professional debut at Reto Máximo 1 in Tijuana on 8 September 2002 alongside Akbarh Arreola.

Arvizu founded Entram in 2006 in Tijuana with the stated goal of contributing to Mexico's combat-sports development and growing the country's then-limited professional MMA scene. ESPN Deportes reported that the gym moved several years later to a four-story facility, which allowed Arvizu to expand his coaching staff. He was selected as an assistant coach on the third season of The Ultimate Fighter: Latin America.

== Development model and coaching staff ==
UFC.com's 2014 profile of Arvizu described a development model in which the coach housed and supported promising young fighters in exchange for work at the gym, including teaching duties; the profile cited former UFC fighter Gabriel Benítez as an example of the model. In a 2020 interview with Diario MMA, Arvizu described his role as coordinating across coaching disciplines rather than leading any single one, working alongside boxing coach Javier "Drift" Cortés, Jesús Sánchez, and Fernando Amado. ESPN Deportes reported in 2022 that the staff also included strength and conditioning coach Andy Caballero (of BodyCore Tijuana) and Brazilian jiu-jitsu coach Martín González.

== Role in Mexican mixed martial arts ==
ESPN Deportes covered Entram in connection with what coach Arvizu described as the "Brandon Moreno effect" — a surge of Latin American MMA prospects relocating to Tijuana to train at Entram following Moreno's UFC Flyweight Championship run. ESPN reported that the gym had grown to host more than 50 fighters from across South America by early 2022. The same outlet has described Entram as one of the most recognized MMA gyms in Mexico.

MMAjunkie has profiled Arvizu and the gym in multiple feature pieces, including a 2021 long-form interview tracing Moreno's path from Entram's children's program to the UFC championship, and follow-up coverage in 2025 of Arvizu's outlook on Mexican MMA and his coaching of current UFC welterweight contender Michael Morales. Mexican business newspaper El Financiero has cited Entram as the gym where Moreno began training at age 12.

In December 2021, UFC official site published a feature on Entram's 2021 fight year, followed in January 2022 by coverage of Moreno and three other Entram-affiliated fighters competing on the UFC 270 card. Tijuana newspaper El Imparcial also covered Entram's UFC 270 participation. In June 2022, MMAjunkie reported on Moreno's departure from Entram to join James Krause's gym, with Entram as the central subject of the piece.

== Ultimate Warrior Challenge Mexico venue ==
Entram has served as a venue for events promoted by Ultimate Warrior Challenge Mexico, a Tijuana-based MMA promotion. Media reports listed Entram as the venue for UWC 38 in 2022 and for another UWC event announced in 2023.

== Hispanic American prospects ==
In November 2025, El Sol de Tijuana reported on the launch of Latin American Prospects (LAP), a regional amateur MMA development project directed by Arvizu and based at Entram. The article described the project as a response to a perceived gap in opportunities for local Tijuana fighters, and reported that Arvizu had stated plans for a free youth MMA school in Tijuana to be opened as part of the project's second phase.

Coverage of the project's fifth event (LAP 05) by El Mexicano and ZETA Tijuana in April 2026 reported that the event was held at Gimnasio Independencia in Tijuana with support from the Instituto Municipal del Deporte de Tijuana, and that LAP's community outreach included inviting more than 50 children from the Orfanatorio Puerta de Fe, one of whom was scheduled to compete on the card.

== Notable fighters ==
Fighters who have trained or are currently training at Entram include:

Current

- Adrián Luna Martinetti
- Yazmin Jauregui
- Michael Morales
- José Alberto Quiñónez
- Silvana Gómez Juárez
- Santiago Luna
- Édgar Cháirez
- Cristian Quiñónez

Past

- Brandon Moreno – Former UFC Flyweight Champion (two times)
- Karina Rodríguez – Former Invicta FC Flyweight Champion
- Akbarh Arreola
- Gabriel "Moggly" Benítez
- Alejandro Pérez Domínguez – The Ultimate Fighter: Latin America winner
- Martin Bravo
- Polo Reyes
- Henry Briones

== See also ==
- List of professional MMA training camps
- Mixed martial arts in Mexico
- Ultimate Warrior Challenge Mexico
