= 2026 in Brave Combat Federation =

Brave Combat Federation MMA events in 2026

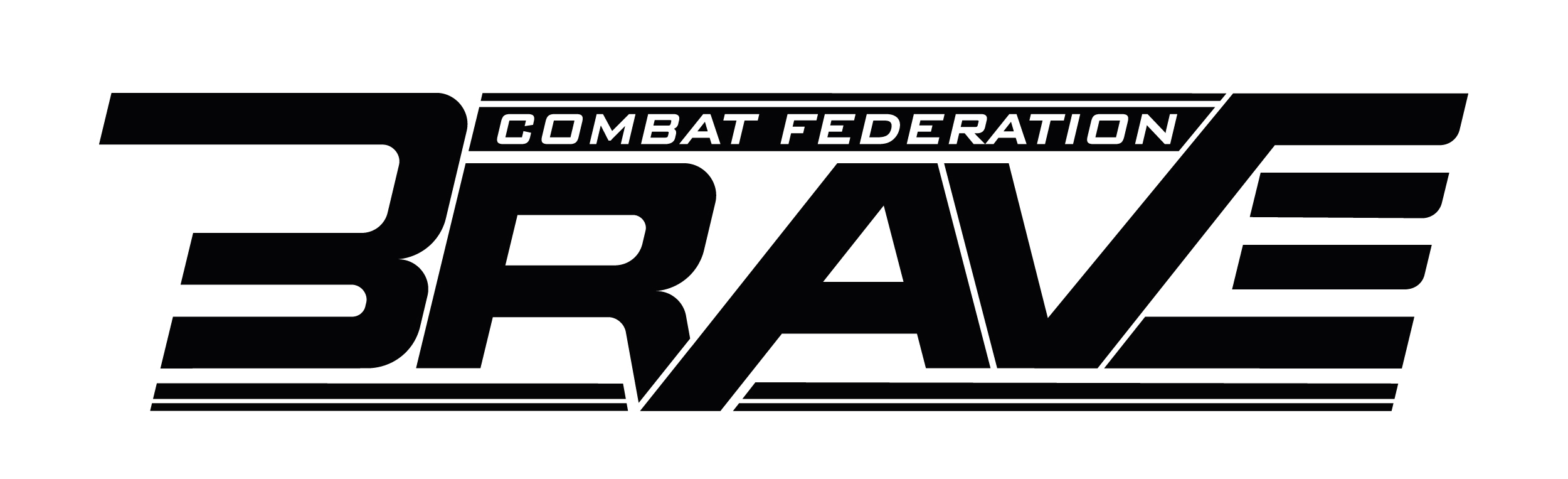

Information
- First date: February 14, 2026

The year 2026 is the 11th year in the history of the Brave Combat Federation, a mixed martial arts promotion based in Bahrain.

== List of events ==
#	Event	Date	Arena	Location
1	Brave CF 104	February 14, 2026	Aleksandar Nikolić Hall	Belgrade, Serbia
2	Brave CF 105	May 31, 2026	Baluan Sholak Sports Palace	Almaty, Kazakhstan
3	Brave CF 106	June 6, 2026	Hala Tivoli	Ljubljana, Slovenia
4	Brave CF 107	August 1, 2026	Arena Burgas	Burgas, Bulgaria
5	Brave CF 108	September 5, 2026	Pula Arena	Pula, Croatia

== Brave CF 104 ==
Brave CF 104
- Promotion: Brave Combat Federation
- Date: February 14, 2026
- Venue: Aleksandar Nikolić Hall
- City: Belgrade, Serbia

Brave CF 104 was a mixed martial arts event held by Brave Combat Federation on February 14, 2026 in Belgrade, Serbia.

=== Background ===
The event marked the promotion's third visit to Belgrade and first since Brave CF 69 in February 2023.

A super welterweight bout between undefeated Nikola Joksović and Luciano Palhano headlined the event.

=== Results ===
Main card (Swerve TV / DAZN)
Weight class				Method	Round	Time	Notes
Super Welterweight	Luciano Palhano	def.	Nikola Joksović	Decision (unanimous) (30–26, 30–26, 30–25)	3	5:00
Heavyweight	Miha Frlić	def.	Samuele Di Guardo	TKO (elbows)	1	3:55
Catchweight (141 lb)	Borislav Nikolić	def.	Matheus Malta	TKO (punches)	2	3:22
Lightweight	Ramazan Gitinov	def.	Artur Arutyunyan	Decision (split) (29–28, 28–29, 29–28)	3	5:00
Heavyweight	Jovan Leka	def.	Charlie Milner	Submission (arm-triangle choke)	1	2:36
Welterweight	Davlet Karataev	def.	Jan Berus	TKO (punches)	1	4:49
Women's Bantamweight	Nina Nikolija Milošević	def.	Dina Osman	Decision (unanimous) (30–26, 30–26, 30–26)	3	5:00
Preliminary card (Swerve TV / DAZN)
Heavyweight	Genadi Jorjoliani	def.	Danylo Voievodkin	TKO (elbows)	1	4:15
Super Lightweight	Ognjen Mićović	def.	Lucian Dragomir	Submission (anaconda choke)	1	1:51
Catchweight (161 lb)	Kurban Idrisov	def.	Artem Buloychik	TKO (head kick and punches)	1	2:11
Super Welterweight	Nikola Todorović	def.	Constantin Cretu	Submission (guillotine choke)	1	1:18
Women's Strawweight	Kinga Jendrasik	def.	Suchika Tariyal	Decision (unanimous) (29–28, 29–28, 29–28)	3	5:00

== Brave CF 105 ==
Brave CF 105
- Promotion: Brave Combat Federation
- Date: May 31, 2026
- Venue: Baluan Sholak Sports Palace
- City: Almaty, Kazakhstan

Brave CF 105 x Alash Pride 123 was a mixed martial arts event being co-promoted by Brave Combat Federation and Alash Pride FC on May 31, 2026, at the Baluan Sholak Sports Palace in Almaty, Kazakhstan.

=== Background ===
The event marked the promotion's fourth visit to Almaty and first since Brave CF 62 in September 2022.

A Brave CF Bantamweight Championship bout between current interim champion Omar Solomanov and former Brave CF Bantamweight Champion Nicholas Hwende co-headlined this event.

=== Results ===
Main card (YouTube / DAZN)
Weight class				Method	Round	Time	Notes
Featherweight	Asylzhan Tasket	def.	Alexey Meshkov	KO (punches)	4	3:30	(Note: For the vacant Alash Pride Featherweight Championship.)
Featherweight	Nicholas Hwende	def.	Omar Solomanov (ic)	Submission (brabo choke)	5	3:18	(Note: For the Brave CF Featherweight Championship.)
Heavyweight	Rassul Khatayev	def.	Vladimir Petrenko	Decision (unanimous)	3	5:00
Catchweight (132 lb)	Dias Yerengaipov	def.	Ryskulbek Ibraimov	Decision (unanimous)	3	5:00
Featherweight	Rauan Bekbolat	def.	Sardor Khudoyberdiev	Submission (triangle choke)	1	3:43
Preliminary card (YouTube / DAZN)
Catchweight (139 lb)	Zhanibek Tynyshtyk	def.	Asylbek Rustambek Uulu	Submission (guillotine choke)	3	2:40
Middleweight	Abdurakhman Umirzakov	def.	Asadbek Ravshanov	TKO (punches)	1	1:22
Light Heavyweight	Murad Abdurakhmanov	def.	Manas Temirbekov	Submission (arm-triangle choke)	1	4:37
Catchweight (163 lb)	Kurban Idrisov	def.	Rustem Kudaibergenov	Decision (unanimous)	3	5:00
Lightweight	Nizambek Abdrashitov	def.	Artur Arutyunyan	Decision (unanimous)	3	5:00
Preliminary card (YouTube / DAZN)
Featherweight	Erkhan Zhumabaev	def.	Eduardo Castro	Decision (unanimous)	3	5:00
Lightweight	Sultan Tagiev	def.	Talant Musakeev	TKO (body kick)	2	3:55
Featherweight	Argen Maratbek Uulu	def.	Georgi Maisuradze	Decision (unanimous)	3	5:00
Catchweight (161 lb)	Kadyrbek Shinbaev	def.	Sharifzhon Akhmedov	TKO (head kick)	2	1:24

== Brave CF 106 ==
Brave CF 106
- Promotion: Brave Combat Federation
- Date: June 6, 2026
- Venue: Hala Tivoli
- City: Ljubljana, Slovenia

Brave CF 106 was a mixed martial arts event held by Brave Combat Federation on June 6, 2026 at the Hala Tivoli in Ljubljana, Slovenia.

=== Background ===
The event marked the promotion's seventh visit to Ljubljana and first since Brave CF 101 in November 2025.

A Brave CF Heavyweight Championship bout between current champion Pavel Dailidko and Miha Frlić headlined this event.

A Brave CF Light Heavyweight Championship bout between current champion Erko Jun and Mohamed Said Maalem co-headlined this event.

=== Results ===
Main card (Swerve TV / DAZN)
Weight class				Method	Round	Time	Notes
Heavyweight	Pavel Dailidko (c)	def.	Miha Frlić	TKO (punches)	1	1:20	(Note: For the Brave CF Heavyweight Championship.)
Light Heavyweight	Mohamed Said Maalem	def.	Erko Jun (c)	TKO (punches)	4	2:19	(Note: For the Brave CF Light Heavyweight Championship.)
Women's Strawweight	Marina Merchuk	def.	Monika Kučinič	Decision (split) (28–29, 29–28, 30–27)	3	5:00
Catchweight (139 lb)	Lasha Abramishvili	def.	Brice Picaud	Decision (unanimous) (29–28, 29–28, 30–27)	3	5:00
Catchweight (171 lb)	Amil Tutić	def.	David Forster	Decision (unanimous) (29–28, 29–28, 29–28)	3	5:00
Preliminary card (YouTube / DAZN)
Lightweight	Domen Drnovšek	def.	István Juhász	Decision (unanimous) (29–28, 29–28, 30–27)	3	5:00
Light Heavyweight	Timon Huss	def.	Domen Vergles	KO (punches)	1	0:50
Featherweight	Edin Ramdedović	def.	Sandor Polik	Submission (guillotine choke)	2	2:51
Women's Flyweight	Maja Drnovšek	def.	Wiktoria Wojciechowska	Submission (arm-triangle choke)	1	1:13
Amateur bout
Middleweight	Leonardo Medeot	def.	Tilen Bregant	Decision (unanimous) (30–27, 30–27, 30–27)	3	3:00

== Brave CF 107 ==
Brave CF 107
- Promotion: Brave Combat Federation
- Date: August 1, 2026
- Venue: Arena Burgas
- City: Burgas, Bulgaria

Brave CF 107 was a mixed martial arts event held by Brave Combat Federation on August 1, 2026 at the Arena Burgas in Burgas, Bulgaria.

=== Background ===
The event marked the promotion's third visit to Burgas and first since Brave CF 97 in July 2025.

A light heavyweight bout between Kaloyan Kolev and Nemanja Kovač was scheduled to headline the event. However, Kovač withdrew due to an injury and was replaced by Salim El Ouassaidi.

=== Results ===
Main card (DAZN)
Weight class				Method	Round	Time	Notes
Catchweight (210 lb)	Salim El Ouassaidi	def.	Kaloyan Kolev	TKO (punches and elbows)	3	3:40
Flyweight	Bidzina Gavashelishvili	def.	Luthando Biko	Decision (unanimous) (30–27, 29–28, 30–27)	3	5:00
Lightweight	Pavel Vladev	def.	Muhammed Kir Ahmet	KO (punches)	1	0:52
Super Welterweight	Deyan Galinov	def.	Alexander Mikael Viana	KO (punch)	2	1:40
Preliminary card (YouTube / DAZN)
Catchweight (150 lb)	Owais Yaqoob	def.	Delyan Georgiev	TKO (punches)	1	4:00
Lightweight	Anton Yanchev	def.	Bachuki Tchikaidze	TKO (elbows and punches)	3	1:50
Catchweight (179 lb)	Bozhidar Ivanov	def.	Ricards Ozols	TKO (punches)	2	4:59
Catchweight (130 lb)	Mohamed Alsameea	def.	Miran Ramani	Decision (unanimous) (30–27, 30–27, 30–26)	3	5:00

== Brave CF 108 ==
Brave CF 108
- Promotion: Brave Combat Federation
- Date: September 5, 2026
- Venue: Pula Arena
- City: Pula, Croatia

Brave CF 108 was a mixed martial arts event held by Brave Combat Federation on September 5, 2026, at the Pula Arena in Pula, Croatia.

=== Background ===
This event marked the organization's debut in Croatia.

A middleweight bout between Andi Vrtačić and Sofiane Bouafia headlined the event.

=== Bonus awards ===
The following fighters received bonuses.

- Fight of the Night: Walter Cogliandro vs. Mathias Prehofer
- Knockout of the Night: Amil Tutić
- Submission of the Night: Domen Drnovšek

=== Results ===
Main card (YouTube / DAZN)
Weight class				Method	Round	Time	Notes
Middleweight	Andi Vrtačić	def.	Sofiane Bouafia	TKO (punches)	2	1:08	(Note: Bouafia missed weight (188 lb).)
Bantamweight	Lasha Abramishvili	def.	Stephen Loman	Decision (unanimous) (30–27, 30–27, 30–27)	3	5:00	(Note: Loman missed weight (136.6 lb).)
Featherweight	Walter Cogliandro	def.	Mathias Prehofer	Decision (unanimous) (30–27, 30–27, 30–27)	3	5:00
Lightweight	Domen Drnovšek	def.	Erik Pletikos	Submission (rear-naked choke)	2	2:06
Super Welterweight	Amil Tutić	def.	Ivan Kiš	KO (knee)	1	2:49
Preliminary card (YouTube / DAZN)
Women's Flyweight	Maja Drnovšek	def.	Aleksandra Sokołowska	Technical Decision (unanimous)	3	0:15	(Note: Accidental illegal knee rendered Sokołowska unable to continue.)
Middleweight	Luka Vrtačić	def.	Ali Hodeib	TKO (punches and elbows)	2	2:21
Catchweight (160 lb)	Filip Vidak	def.	Patrick Pereša	Submission (rear-naked choke)	2	1:12
Amateur bout
Super Welterweight	Roni Pavlovic	def.	Nejc Rupreht	Submission (rear-naked choke)	1	2:19

== See also ==
- List of current Brave CF fighters
- List of current mixed martial arts champions
- 2026 in UFC
- 2026 in Professional Fighters League
- 2026 in Cage Warriors
- 2026 in ONE Championship
- 2026 in Absolute Championship Akhmat
- 2026 in Konfrontacja Sztuk Walki
- 2026 in Rizin Fighting Federation
- 2026 in Oktagon MMA
- 2026 in LUX Fight League
- 2026 in Legacy Fighting Alliance
