= 2025 in Brave Combat Federation =

Brave Combat Federation
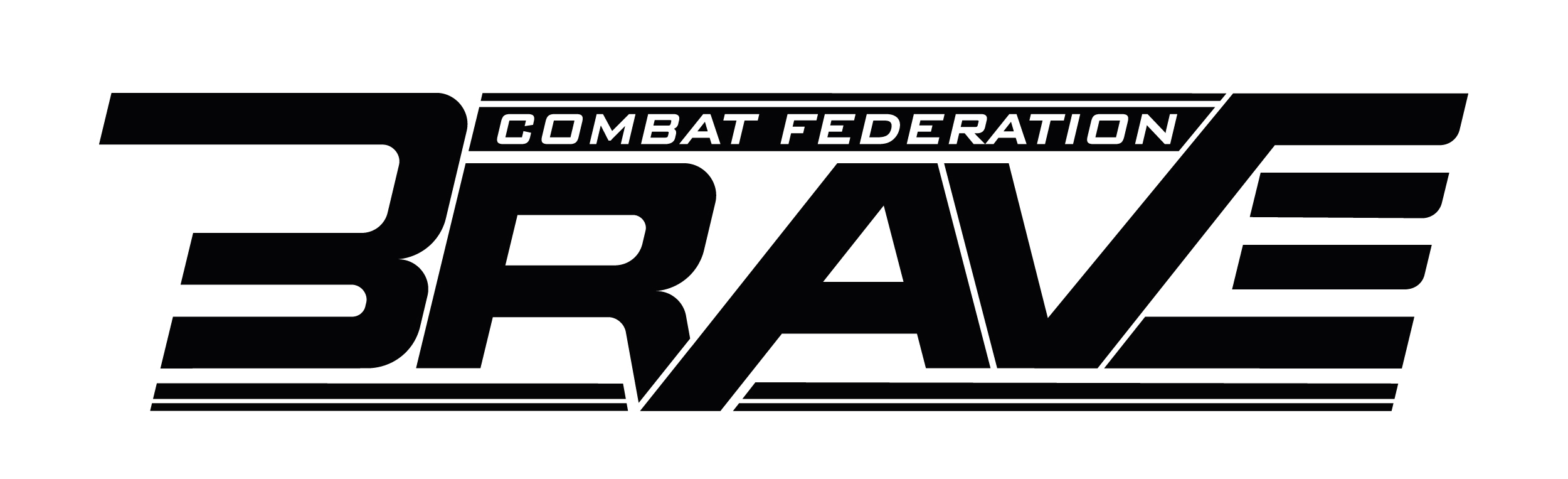

Information
- First date: April 18, 2025
- Last date: December 21, 2025

Events
- Total events: 12

The year 2025 was the 10th year in the history of the Brave Combat Federation, a mixed martial arts promotion based in Bahrain.

== List of events ==
| # | Event | Date | Venue | Location |
|---|---|---|---|---|
| 1 | Brave CF 93 | April 18, 2025 | Henan TV Studio 8 | Zhengzhou, China |
| 2 | Brave CF 94 | May 17, 2025 | Geneva Arena | Geneva, Switzerland |
| 3 | Brave CF 95 | May 31, 2025 | Pabellón Santiago Martín | Tenerife, Spain |
| 4 | Brave CF 96 | June 7, 2025 | Hala Tivoli | Ljubljana, Slovenia |
| 5 | Brave CF 97 | July 12, 2025 | Arena Burgas | Burgas, Bulgaria |
| 6 | Brave CF 98 | September 19, 2025 | Henan TV Studio 8 | Zhengzhou, China |
| 7 | Brave CF: Georgia vs. The World | October 3, 2025 | Tbilisi New Sports Palace | Tbilisi, Georgia |
| 8 | Brave CF 99 | October 18, 2025 | Twinsbet Arena | Vilnius, Lithuania |
| 9 | Brave CF 100 | November 7, 2025 | Khalifa Sports City Stadium | Isa Town, Bahrain |
| 10 | Brave CF 101 | November 9, 2025 | Khalifa Sports City Stadium | Isa Town, Bahrain |
| 11 | Brave CF 102 | November 23, 2025 | Hala Tivoli | Ljubljana, Slovenia |
| 12 | Brave CF 103 | December 21, 2025 | Bukhara Universal Sports Complex | Bukhara, Uzbekistan |

== Brave CF 93 ==
Brave CF 93
- Promotion: Brave Combat Federation
- Date: April 18, 2025
- Venue: Henan TV Studio 8
- City: Zhengzhou, China

Brave CF 93 was a mixed martial arts event held by Brave Combat Federation on April 18, 2025 in Zhengzhou, China.

=== Background ===
The event marked the promotion's second visit to China and first since the country's much anticipated debut at Brave CF 84 in August 2024. This event also held in association with leading regional promotion Youde Fighting Ultimate (YFU).

A lightweight bout between Raul Tutarauli and Olzhas Eskaraev headlined the event.

=== Results ===
Main card (YouTube)
| Weight Class | | | | Method | Round | Time | Notes |
|---|---|---|---|---|---|---|---|
| Lightweight 70 kg | (Georgia (country)) Raul Tutarauli | def. | (Kazakhstan) Olzhas Eskaraev | Decision (unanimous) | 3 | 5:00 | |
| Catchweight 62.5 kg | (Tajikistan) Khurshed Nazarov | def. | (China) Keremuaili Maimaitituoheti | KO (punch) | 1 | 0:17 | |
| Catchweight 59 kg | (South Africa) Luthando Biko | def. | (China) Zou Jinbo | TKO (elbow) | 2 | 4:48 | |
| Lightweight 70 kg | (Georgia (country)) Davit Lortqipanidze | def. | (China) Aizezi Damolamu | Decision (unanimous) | 3 | 5:00 | |
Preliminary card (YouTube)
| Catchweight 58.5 kg | (Georgia (country)) Juba Beridze | def. | (China) Yang Weiqiang | Decision (unanimous) | 3 | 5:00 | |
| Featherweight 66 kg | (Kazakhstan) Rauan Bekbolat | def. | (China) Zeqiu Duoji | KO (punch to the body) | 1 | 1:24 | |
| Bantamweight 61 kg | (Nepal) Rabindra Dhant | def. | (China) Eqiyuebu | TKO (punches) | 1 | 2:56 | |
| Featherweight 66 kg | (China) Wan Fayang | def. | (Iran) Mojtaba Nasiri | Decision (unanimous) | 3 | 5:00 | |

== Brave CF 94 ==
Brave CF 94
- Promotion: Brave Combat Federation
- Date: May 17, 2025
- Venue: Geneva Arena
- City: Geneva, Switzerland

BRAVE CF 94 was a mixed martial arts event held by Brave Combat Federation on May 17, 2025 in Geneva, Switzerland.

=== Background ===
This event marked the promotion's debut in Switzerland. This event also held in association with Elite Warriors Championship (EWC).

A Brave CF Heavyweight Championship bout between current champion Pavel Dailidko and undefeated contender Odie Delaney headlined the event.

=== Results ===
Main card (YouTube)
| Weight Class | | | | Method | Round | Time | Notes |
|---|---|---|---|---|---|---|---|
| Heavyweight 120 kg | (Lithuania) Pavel Dailidko (c) | def. | (United States) Odie Delaney | TKO (Punches) | 2 | 0:57 | For the Brave CF Heavyweight Championship. |
| Featherweight 66 kg | (France) Damien Lapilus | def. | (Brazil) Victor Hugo | Decision (Unanimous) | 3 | 5:00 | |
| Super Welterweight 79 kg | (France) Alex Lohoré | def. | (Poland) Mansur Abdurzakov | TKO (Punches) | 3 | 4:37 | |
| Catchweight 72 kg | (Belgium) Youssef Boughanem | def. | (Greece) Dimitris Moirotsos | TKO (corner stoppage) | 2 | 5:00 | Boughanem missed weight (72.7 kg). |
| Middleweight 84 kg | (Germany) Yusup Magomedov | def. | (Georgia (country)) Tornike Gigauri | Decision (Unanimous) | 3 | 5:00 | |
Preliminary card (YouTube)
| Catchweight 77 kg | (Switzerland) Kevin Ruart | def. | (Lebanon) Ahmed Labban | KO (Punch) | 2 | 0:28 | Ruart made weight in the second attempt |
| Lightweight 70 kg | (Austria) Magomed-Emin Dadaev | def. | (Venezuela) Karol Jesus Arteaga | TKO (Elbows and Punches) | 3 | 1:20 | |
| Lightweight 70 kg | (Germany) Dejan Ovuka | def. | (Venezuela) Kevin Quiroz | TKO (Punches) | 2 | 0:18 | |

== Brave CF 95 ==
Brave CF 95
- Promotion: Brave Combat Federation
- Date: May 31, 2025
- Venue: Pabellón Santiago Martín
- City: Tenerife, Spain

BRAVE CF 95 was a mixed martial arts event held by Brave Combat Federation on May 31, 2025 at the Pabellón Insular Santiago Martín in Tenerife, Spain.

=== Background ===
The event marked the promotion's third visit to Tenerife and first since Brave CF 89 in October 2024.

A lightweight bout between Acoidan Duque and Jason Ponet headlined the event.

=== Results ===
Main card (YouTube)
| Weight Class | | | | Method | Round | Time | Notes |
|---|---|---|---|---|---|---|---|
| Lightweight 70 kg | (Spain) Acoidan Duque | def. | (France) Jason Ponet | Decision (unanimous) | 3 | 5:00 | |
| Flyweight 57 kg | (Kazakhstan) Dias Yerengaipov | def. | (United States) Jose Torres | Decision (unanimous) | 3 | 5:00 | |
| Catchweight 74 kg | (Germany) Christian Mach | def. | (Spain) Enrique Marín | KO (head kick and punches) | 2 | 0:36 | |
Preliminary card (YouTube)
| Featherweight 66 kg | (Georgia (country)) Ilia Qarukhnishvili | def. | (Netherlands) Daan Duijs | Decision (unanimous) | 3 | 5:00 | |
| Catchweight 77.3 kg | (Algeria) Abdelkrim Zouad | def. | (Austria) Muslim Danaev | Submission (brabo choke) | 3 | 4:36 | |
| Featherweight 66 kg | (Spain) Theodore Bashford | def. | (Germany) Eduard Evdokimov | TKO (head kick and punches) | 3 | 0:58 | |
| Catchweight 63 kg | (Poland) Jakub Drozdowski | def. | (Spain) Juan Carlos Izquierdo | Decision (unanimous) | 3 | 5:00 | |
| Flyweight 57 kg | (Spain) Reda Abdellaoui | def. | (Romania) Moraru Gheorghe | Submission (rear-naked choke) | 1 | 2:44 | |

== Brave CF 96 ==
Brave CF 96
- Promotion: Brave Combat Federation
- Date: June 7, 2025
- Venue: Hala Tivoli
- City: Ljubljana, Slovenia

Brave CF 96 was a mixed martial arts event held by Brave Combat Federation on June 7, 2025, at the Hala Tivoli in Ljubljana, Slovenia.

=== Background ===
The event marked the promotion's fifth visit to Ljubljana and first since Brave CF 88 in September 2024. This event also held in association with leading regional promotion WFC.

A Brave CF Middleweight Championship bout between a current Brave CF Light Heavyweight Champion Erko Jun and former champion (also former Light Heavyweight Champion) Mohammad Fakhreddine headlined the event.

A Brave CF Bantamweight Championship bout between current champion Nicholas Hwende and Borislav Nikolić served as co-main event.

=== Results ===
Main card (YouTube)
| Weight Class | | | | Method | Round | Time | Notes |
|---|---|---|---|---|---|---|---|
| Light Heavyweight 93 kg | (Lebanon) Mohammad Fakhreddine | def. | (Bosnia and Herzegovina) Erko Jun (c) | KO (punch) | 1 | 4:43 | For the Brave CF Middleweight Championship. |
| Bantamweight 61 kg | (Serbia) Borislav Nikolić | def. | (Zimbabwe) Nicholas Hwende (c) | Technical Submission (ninja choke) | 4 | 1:42 | For the Brave CF Bantamweight Championship. |
| Heavyweight 120 kg | (Slovenia) Miha Frlić | def. | (Bangladesh) Shah Kamali | TKO (punches) | 3 | 0:27 | |
| Women's Strawweight 52 kg | (Slovenia) Monika Kučinič | def. | (Georgia (country)) Sofiia Bagishvili | TKO (body kick and punches) | 2 | 4:54 | |
| Flyweight 57 kg | (Brazil) Marciano Ferreira | def. | (Georgia (country)) Bidzina Gavashelishvili | Decision (unanimous) | 3 | 5:00 | |
| Catchweight 77 kg | (Poland) Arkadiusz Pałkowski | def. | (Slovenia) Jan Berus | TKO (punches) | 2 | 2:26 | |
| Super Lightweight 75 kg | (Estonia) Kristjan Toniste | def. | (Croatia) David Forster | Decision (unanimous) | 3 | 5:00 | |
| Lightweight 70 kg | (Slovenia) Domen Drnovsek | def. | (Serbia) Filip Guša | Decision (unanimous) | 3 | 5:00 | |
Amateur bouts
| Welterweight 77 kg | (Slovenia) Kirill Negru | def. | (Slovakia) Robert Guth | Decision (unanimous) | 3 | 5:00 | |

== Brave CF 97 ==
Brave CF 97
- Promotion: Brave Combat Federation
- Date: July 12, 2025
- Venue: Arena Burgas
- City: Burgas, Bulgaria

Brave CF 97 was a mixed martial arts event held by Brave Combat Federation on July 12, 2025 in Burgas, Bulgaria.

=== Background ===
The event marked the promotion's second visit to Bulgaria and first since the country's much anticipated debut at Brave CF 86 in August 2024. This event also held in association with leading regional promotion Bulgarian Fight Agency.

A light heavyweight bout between Kaloyan Kolev and former Brave CF Light Heavyweight Champion Mohamed Said Maalem headlined the event.

=== Results ===
Main card (YouTube)
| Weight Class | | | | Method | Round | Time | Notes |
|---|---|---|---|---|---|---|---|
| Light Heavyweight 93 kg | (Bulgaria) Kaloyan Kolev | vs. | (Algeria) Mohamed Said Maalem | Draw (Majority) | 3 | 5:00 | |
| Bantamweight 61 kg | (Georgia (country)) Lasha Abramishvili | def. | (France) Brice Picaud | Submission (Rear-Naked Choke) | 2 | 2:50 | |
| Middleweight 84 kg | (Bulgaria) Plamen Penchev | def. | (Algeria) Sofiane Bouafia | KO (Punch) | 1 | 0:54 | |
Preliminary card (YouTube)
| Flyweight 57 kg | (Republic of Ireland) Gerard Burns | def. | (Venezuela) Alinson Ochoa | Decision (Unanimous) | 3 | 5:00 | |
| Lightweight 70 kg | (Bulgaria) Anton Yanchev | def. | (France) Johan Van de Hel | Submission (Arm-Triangle Choke) | 1 | 3:35 | |
| Catchweight 77 kg | (Bahrain) Murad Guseinov | def. | (Colombia) Gabriel Bula | TKO (Punches) | 1 | 4:05 | |
| Super Welterweight 79 kg | (Bulgaria) Deyan Galinov | def. | (The Gambia) Abdou Kadirr Sowe | KO (Punch) | 2 | 2:35 | |
| Women's Strawweight 52 kg | (England) Miriam Grubb | def. | (Germany) Songül Karatorak | Decision (Unanimous) | 3 | 5:00 | |
| Welterweight 77 kg | (Bulgaria) Viktor Grigorov | def. | (Bulgaria) Stoyan Gochev | Decision (Unanimous) | 3 | 5:00 | |
| Welterweight 77 kg | (Bulgaria) Blagoy Lachev | def. | (Bulgaria) Tuan Nguen | TKO (Punches) | 1 | 0:52 | |
| Light Heavyweight 93 kg | (Bulgaria) Delian Alishahi | def. | (Bulgaria) Georgi Petkov Bagera | Decision (Unanimous) | 3 | 5:00 | |

== Brave CF 98 ==
Brave CF 98
- Promotion: Brave Combat Federation
- Date: September 19, 2025
- Venue: Henan TV Studio 8
- City: Zhengzhou, China

Brave CF 98 was a mixed martial arts event held by Brave Combat Federation on September 19, 2025 in Zhengzhou, China.

=== Background ===
The event marked the promotion's third visit to Zhengzhou and first since Brave CF 93 in April 2025.

An interim Brave CF Featherweight Championship bout between Rauan Bekbolat and Omar Solomanov headlined the event.

=== Results ===
Main card (YouTube)
| Weight Class | | | | Method | Round | Time | Notes |
|---|---|---|---|---|---|---|---|
| Featherweight 66 kg | (Ukraine) Omar Solomanov | def. | (Kazakhstan) Rauan Bekbolat | Decision (unanimous) | 5 | 5:00 | For the interim Brave CF Featherweight Championship. |
| Featherweight 66 kg | (Zimbabwe) Nicholas Hwende | def. | (China) Xie Bin | Decision (unanimous) | 3 | 5:00 | |
| Lightweight 70 kg | (India) Owais Yaqoob | def. | (Philippines) Ian Paul Lora | TKO (submission to punches) | 1 | 1:54 | |
| Catchweight 59 kg | (China) Ji Niushiyue | def. | (South Africa) Luthando Biko | Decision (unanimous) | 3 | 5:00 | |
| Bantamweight 61 kg | (China) Ti Haitao | def. | (India) Kantharaj Agasa | TKO (punches) | 1 | 1:34 | |
| Featherweight 66 kg | (China) Kalinu Kadelibieke | def. | (Mongolia) Turbayar Khurelbaatar | TKO (punches) | 3 | 2:18 | |
| Featherweight 66 kg | (China) Zeqiu Duoji | def. | (India) Mojtaba Nasiri | Decision (unanimous) | 3 | 5:00 | |
| Featherweight 66 kg | (Egypt) Ahmed Tarek | def. | (China) Zhao Yikun | Decision (unanimous) | 3 | 5:00 | |

== Brave CF: Georgia vs. The World ==
Brave CF: Georgia vs. The World
- Promotion: Brave Combat Federation
- Date: October 3, 2025
- Venue: Tbilisi New Sports Palace
- City: (Georgia (country)) Tbilisi, Georgia

Brave CF: Georgia vs. The World was a mixed martial arts event held by Brave Combat Federation on October 3, 2025 in Tbilisi, Georgia.

=== Background ===
The event marked the organization's debut in Georgia, which became the 37th country to hold a Brave CF event.

An interim Brave CF Lightweight Championship bout between Raul Tutarauli and Pieter Buist headlined the event.

=== Results ===
Main card (DAZN)
| Weight Class | | | | Method | Round | Time | Notes |
|---|---|---|---|---|---|---|---|
| Lightweight 70 kg | (Georgia (country)) Raul Tutarauli | def. | (Netherlands) Pieter Buist | Decision (unanimous) | 5 | 5:00 | For the interim Brave CF Lightweight Championship. |
| Bantamweight 61 kg | (Georgia (country)) Lasha Abramishvili | def. | (Tajikistan) Khurshed Nazarov | TKO (punches) | 1 | 4:59 | |
| Middleweight 84 kg | (Georgia (country)) Mukhrani Narsavidze | def. | (Moldova) Gheorghe Gritko | Submission (arm-triangle choke) | 1 | 3:10 | |
| Featherweight 66 kg | (Georgia (country)) Luka Giorgadze | def. | (Aruba) Reymond Jowett | Decision (unanimous) | 3 | 5:00 | |
| Catchweight 59.5 kg | (Pakistan) Ismail Khan | def. | (Azerbaijan) Elmir Jafarov | Submission (rear-naked choke) | 1 | 3:30 | |
| Featherweight 66 kg | (Kazakhstan) Timur Kuanysh | def. | (Georgia (country)) Dimitri Bolkvadze | Decision (unanimous) | 3 | 5:00 | |
| Women's Flyweight 57 kg | (Georgia (country)) Borena Tsertsvadze | def. | (Azerbaijan) Khanim Bashirova | Submission (scarf hold armlock) | 1 | 4:03 | |
| Lightweight 70 kg | (Georgia (country)) Badri Focxverashvili | def. | (France) Levy Carriel | Decision (unanimous) | 3 | 5:00 | |
| Flyweight 57 kg | (Bulgaria) Nikolay Atanasov | def. | (Azerbaijan) Adigozel Guliyev | Decision (split) | 3 | 5:00 | |

== Brave CF 99 ==
Brave CF 99
- Promotion: Brave Combat Federation
- Date: October 18, 2025
- Venue: Twinsbet Arena
- City: Vilnius, Lithuania

Brave CF 99 was a mixed martial arts event held by Brave Combat Federation on October 18, 2025, in Vilnius, Lithuania.

=== Background ===
Twinsbet Arena hosted the promotion's debut in Lithuania, which was the 38th country to hold a Brave CF event. This event is also held in association with UTMA regional organization.

A Brave CF Heavyweight Championship bout between current champion Pavel Dailidko and Grégory Robinet headlined the event.

=== Fight card ===
Main card (beIN Sports)
| Weight Class | | | | Method | Round | Time | Notes |
|---|---|---|---|---|---|---|---|
| Heavyweight 120 kg | (Lithuania) Pavel Dailidko (c) | def. | (France) Grégory Robinet | TKO (Strikes) | 1 | 3:15 | For the Brave CF Heavyweight Championship. |
| Heavyweight 120 kg | (Georgia (country)) Shota Betlemidze | def. | (Lithuania) Tomas Pakutinskas | DQ (Punches to back of head) | 1 | | |
| Flyweight 57 kg | (Georgia (country)) Bidzina Gavashelishvili | def. | (Turkey) Alperen Karabulut | Decision (Unanimous) | 3 | 5:00 | |
| Light Heavyweight 93 kg | (Lithuania) Laurynas Urbonavicius | def. | (Morocco) Salim El Ouassaidi | Decision (Unanimous) | 3 | 5:00 | |
| Lightweight 70 kg | (Lithuania) Žygimantas Ramaška | def. | (France) Geysim Derouiche | Submission (Armbar) | 1 | 4:08 | |
| Catchweight 63 kg | (Lithuania) Nauris Bartoška | def. | (Poland) Jakub Drozdowski | TKO (Doctor Stoppage) | 1 | 5:00 | |
| Catchweight 77 kg | (Germany) Christian Mach | def. | (Lithuania) Mantvydas Perednis | Submission (Rear Naked Choke) | 1 | 2:56 | |
Preliminary card (beIN Sports)
| Middleweight 84 kg | (Latvia) Ričards Ozols | def. | (Georgia (country)) Tornike Gigauri | KO (Head Kick) | 1 | 3:18 | |
| Bantamweight 61 kg | (Lithuania) Deividas Zamba | vs. | (England) Robert Masters | No Contest (Cage Malfunction) | 1 | 5:00 | |
| Lightweight 70 kg | (Lithuania) Emilijus Kaganovicius | vs. | (England) Tim Quinlan | Submission (Rear Naked Choke) | 1 | 4:47 | |

== Brave CF 100 ==
Brave CF 100
- Promotion: Brave Combat Federation
- Date: November 7, 2025
- Venue: Khalifa Sports City Stadium
- City: Isa Town, Bahrain

Brave CF 100 was a mixed martial arts event held by Brave Combat Federation on November 7, 2025, in Isa Town, Bahrain.

=== Background ===
An interim Brave CF Super Welterweight Championship bout between a current two-time Brave CF Middleweight Champion (also former Brave CF Light Heavyweight Champion) Mohammad Fakhreddine and Alex Lohoré is scheduled to headline the event.

An inaugural Brave CF Flyweight Championship bout between undefeated prospect and UFC veteran Muhammad Mokaev and Gerard Burns took take place at the event.

=== Results ===
Main card (YouTube / DAZN)
| Weight class | | | | Method | Round | Time | Notes |
|---|---|---|---|---|---|---|---|
| Bantamweight | Borislav Nikolić (c) | def. | Hamza Kooheji | KO (punches) | 4 | 4:53 | (Note: For the Brave CF Bantamweight Championship.) |
| Flyweight | Muhammad Mokaev | def. | Gerard Burns | KO (head kick and punch) | 2 | 0:08 | (Note: For the inaugural Brave CF Flyweight Championship.) |
| Super Welterweight | Rasul Magomedov | def. | Bahatebole Batebolati | Decision (unanimous) (30–27, 30–27, 29–28) | 3 | 5:00 |
Preliminary card (YouTube / DAZN)
| Super Welterweight | Mohamed Salem | def. | Rami Hamed | Decision (unanimous) (29–28, 29–28, 29–28) | 3 | 5:00 |
| Flyweight | Mohamed Alsameea | def. | Mahmoud Amr | TKO (punches) | 1 | 0:45 |
| Women's Strawweight | Mim Grubb | def. | Fabiola Nascimento | Submission (rear-naked choke) | 3 | 4:43 |
| Women's Strawweight | Aarti Khatri | def. | Arofat Toirova | Submission (armbar) | 1 | 2:26 |
| Lightweight | Hussain Al Kurdi | def. | Nour Jopa | Technical Submission (rear-naked choke) | 1 | 1:11 |

== Brave CF 101 ==
Brave CF 101
- Promotion: Brave Combat Federation
- Date: November 9, 2025
- Venue: Khalifa Sports City Stadium
- City: Isa Town, Bahrain

Brave CF 101 is an upcoming mixed martial arts event held by Brave Combat Federation on November 9, 2025, in Isa Town, Bahrain.

=== Results ===
Main card (YouTube / DAZN)
| Weight class | | | | Method | Round | Time | Notes |
|---|---|---|---|---|---|---|---|
| Flyweight | Magomed Idrisov | def. | Marciano Ferreira | Decision (unanimous) (30–27, 30–27, 30–26) | 3 | 5:00 |
| Lightweight | Ramazan Gitinov | def. | Nursultan Asker | Submission (rear-naked choke) | 1 | 3:07 |
| Catchweight (161 lb) | Youssef Boughanem | def. | Anthony Zeidan | TKO (knee to the body) | 1 | 4:16 |
| Catchweight (130 lb) | Dias Yerengaipov | def. | Bairam Shammadov | Decision (split) (29–28, 28–29, 29–28) | 3 | 5:00 |
| Super Welterweight | Murad Guseinov | def. | Ali Hussein Nedal | KO (punches) | 1 | 0:32 |
Preliminary card (YouTube / DAZN)
| Bantamweight | Punyajit Likharu | vs. | Awan Aqib | Technical Decision (unanimous draw) (29–29, 29–29, 29–29) | 3 | 1:05 | (Note: Accidental eye poke rendered Aqib unable to continue.) |
| Super Welterweight | Khalifa Janahi | def. | Ahmed Waheed Ahmed | KO (knee) | 1 | 1:52 |
| Super Lightweight | Ali Hasan Marhoon | def. | Youssef Ibrahem | TKO (knee and punches) | 1 | 4:57 |
| Super Welterweight | Abdulrahman Ali Janahi | def. | Montazer Muhammad | TKO (punches) | 1 | 3:26 |
Amateur bout
| Featherweight | Youssef Al Kurdi | def. | Ahmed Adel Ganzoury | Decision (unanimous) (30–27, 30–27, 30–27) | 3 | 5:00 |

== Brave CF 102 ==
Brave CF 102
- Promotion: Brave Combat Federation
- Date: November 23, 2025
- Venue: Hala Tivoli
- City: Ljubljana, Slovenia

Brave CF 102 was a mixed martial arts event held by Brave Combat Federation on November 23, 2025, at the Hala Tivoli in Ljubljana, Slovenia.

=== Background ===
The main event for WFC 29 - BRAVE CF 102 is official: Slovenia's own Miha Frlić vs. Poland's power-punching Patryk Dubiela

=== Results ===
Main card (YouTube / DAZN)
| Weight class | | | | Method | Round | Time | Notes |
|---|---|---|---|---|---|---|---|
| Heavyweight | Miha Frlić | def. | Patryk Dubiela | TKO (punches) | 2 | 0:58 |
| Women's Strawweight | Marina Merchuk | def. | Marina Spasić | Decision (unanimous) (30–27, 30–27, 29–28) | 3 | 5:00 |
| Welterweight | Jan Berus | def. | Gabriele Varesano | TKO (body kicks and punches) | 1 | 4:54 |
| Welterweight | David Forster | def. | Amil Tutić | Decision (unanimous) (29–28, 29–28, 29–28) | 3 | 5:00 |
| Lightweight | Domen Drnovšek | vs. | Lucian Dragomir | No Contest (accidental eye poke) | 1 | 3:12 |
Preliminary card (YouTube / DAZN)
| Super Welterweight | Ognjen Mićović | def. | Lasha Abashidze | Submission (guillotine choke) | 1 | 3:41 |
| Lightweight | Tomáš Galko | def. | Žan Boženk | TKO (elbows and punches) | 2 | 4:39 |
| Super Lightweight | István Juhász | def. | Marko Pecar | Decision (unanimous) (29–28, 29–28, 29–28) | 3 | 5:00 |
| Women's Bantamweight | Maja Drnovšek | def. | Ghita Chafik | Decision (unanimous) (30–27, 30–26, 30–26) | 3 | 5:00 |
Amateur bout
| Lightweight | Aladin Ibrović | def. | Ihsan Guerard | Submission (armbar) | 1 | 2:50 |

== Brave CF 103 ==
Brave CF 103
- Promotion: Brave Combat Federation
- Date: December 23, 2025
- Venue: Bukhara Universal Sports Complex
- City: Bukhara, Uzbekistan

Brave CF 103 was a mixed martial arts event held by Brave Combat Federation on December 21, 2025 in Bukhara, Uzbekistan.

=== Background ===
Bonus awards

The following fighters were awarded bonuses:

- Fight of the Night:
- Submission of the Night:
- Knockout of the Night:

=== Results ===
Main card (YouTube)
| Weight class | | | | Method | Round | Time | Notes |
|---|---|---|---|---|---|---|---|
| Lightweight | Nozim Kalandarov | def. | Rizwan Ali | Decision (unanimous) (30–27, 30–27, 30–27) | 3 | 5:00 |
| Featherweight | Koshen Akanov | def. | Sardor Khudoyberdiev | TKO (punches) | 1 | 0:55 |
| Lightweight | Nizambek Abdrashitov | def. | Abdurakhmon Gafurov | Decision (unanimous) (30–27, 30–27, 30–27) | 3 | 5:00 |
| Super Lightweight | Khamzat Maaev | def. | Mirbek Zhenishbekov | TKO (elbows and punches) | 2 | 4:43 |
| Super Welterweight | Zagid Gaidarov | def. | Ruslan Serikpulov | TKO (punches) | 1 | 2:02 |
| Catchweight (130 lb) | Ismail Khan | def. | Rayimbek Tazhibaev | Technical Submission (arm-triangle choke) | 2 | 2:48 |
| Lightweight | Owais Yaqoob | def. | Mehmet Can-Tasdoven | TKO (knee and punches) | 1 | 1:25 |

== See also ==
- List of current Brave CF fighters
- List of current mixed martial arts champions
- 2025 in UFC
- 2025 in Professional Fighters League
- 2025 in Cage Warriors
- 2025 in ONE Championship
- 2025 in Absolute Championship Akhmat
- 2025 in Konfrontacja Sztuk Walki
- 2025 in Rizin Fighting Federation
- 2025 in LUX Fight League
- 2025 in Oktagon MMA
- 2025 in UAE Warriors
- 2025 in Legacy Fighting Alliance
