= Miha Frlić =

Slovenian mixed martial artist (born 1999)

Miha Frlic
- Born: May 30, 1999 (age 27); Škofja Loka, Slovenia
- Height: 5 ft 11 in (1.80 m)
- Weight: 235 lb (107 kg; 16 st 11 lb)
- Division: Heavyweight (2023–present)
- Reach: 74 in (188 cm)
- Stance: Orthodox
- Fighting out of: Škofja Loka, Slovenia
- Team: Klub Chiko Gym
- Years active: 2023–present

Mixed martial arts record
- Total: 9
- Wins: 7
- By knockout: 7
- By submission: 0
- By decision: 0
- Losses: 1
- By knockout: 1
- Draws: 1

Other information
- Mixed martial arts record from Sherdog

Miha Frlic (born May 30, 1999) is a Slovenian professional mixed martial artist. He currently competes in the Heavyweight division of Brave Combat Federation. He has previously competed on Konfrontacja Sztuk Walki (KSW).

== Professional career ==
=== Early career ===
Frlic made his professional debut on April 23, 2023, against Danylo Kartavyi under the federation Brave Combat Federation. The bout ended in a Unanimous Draw.

=== Valhalla Fight Night ===
Frlic made his debut under Valhalla Fight Night on October 28, 2023, against Antonio Oprea. Frlic won the fight via a first-round TKO.

His next fight came on January 20, 2024, against Tim Kelc. Frlic won the fight via a first-round TKO.

=== Brave Combat Federation ===
Frlic returned to Brave Combat Federation on September 28, 2024, against Samuele Di Guardo. Frlic won the fight via a first-round TKO.

=== Konfrontacja Sztuk Walki ===
Frlic made his debut under Konfrontacja Sztuk Walki (KSW) on January 25, 2025, against Kamil Gawryjołek. Frlic won the fight via a first-round TKO, becoming the first Slovenian in promotion history to win a fight.

=== Return to Brave CF ===
Frlic returned to Brave Combat Federation on June 7, 2025, against Shah Kamali. Frlic won the fight via a third-round TKO.

His next fight came on November 23, 2025, against Patryk Dubiela. Frlic won the fight via a second-round TKO.

His next fight came on February 14, 2026, in a rematch against Samuele Di Guardo. Frlic won the fight via a first-round TKO.

== Mixed martial arts record ==
Professional record breakdown
9 matches	7 wins	1 loss
By knockout	7	1
Draws	1	

Res.	Record	Opponent	Method	Event	Date	Round	Time	Location	Notes
Loss	7–1–1	Pavel Dailidko	TKO (punches)	Brave CF 106	June 6, 2026	1	1:20	Ljubljana, Slovenia	For the Brave CF Heavyweight Championship.
Win	7–0–1	Samuele Di Guardo	TKO (elbows)	Brave CF 104	February 14, 2026	1	3:55	Belgrade, Serbia	
Win	6–0–1	Patryk Dubiela	TKO (punches)	Brave CF 102	November 23, 2025	2	0:58	Ljubljana, Slovenia	
Win	5–0–1	Shah Kamali	TKO (punches)	Brave CF 96	June 7, 2025	3	0:27	Ljubljana, Slovenia	
Win	4–0–1	Kamil Gawryjołek	TKO (punches)	KSW 102	January 25, 2025	1	2:12	Radom, Poland	
Win	3–0–1	Samuele Di Guardo	TKO (punches)	Brave CF 88	September 28, 2024	1	0:37	Ljubljana, Slovenia	
Win	2–0–1	Tim Kelc	TKO (punches)	Valhalla Fight Night 8	January 20, 2024	1	1:25	Velenje, Slovenia	
Win	1–0–1	Antonio Oprea	TKO (punches)	Valhalla Fight Night 7	October 28, 2023	1	2:02	Koper, Slovenia	
Draw	0–0–1	Danylo Kartavyi	Draw (unanimous)	Brave CF 70	April 23, 2023	3	5:00	Ljubljana, Slovenia	Heavyweight debut.

== See also ==
- List of male mixed martial artists
- List of current Brave CF fighters
- List of current Konfrontacja Sztuk Walki fighters
- List of IMMAF championships
