= Ismail Khan (fighter) =

Pakistani mixed martial artist (born 1995)

- Born: August 20, 2002 (age 24); Rawalpindi, Pakistan
- Native name: اسماعیل خان
- Other names: The Volcano
- Height: 5 ft 8 in (1.73 m)
- Weight: 135 lb (61 kg; 9 st 9 lb)
- Division: Flyweight (2022–present); Bantamweight (2023–present)
- Reach: 70.5 in (179 cm)
- Stance: Orthodox
- Fighting out of: Rawalpindi, Pakistan
- Team: KAK'S Fight Club
- Years active: 2022–present

Mixed martial arts record
- Total: 13
- Wins: 12
- By knockout: 2
- By submission: 7
- By decision: 3
- Losses: 1
- By submission: 1

Other information
- Mixed martial arts record from Sherdog

Ismail Khan (Urdu: اسماعیل خان; born August 20, 2002) is a Pakistani professional mixed martial artist. He currently competes in the Bantamweight division for Brave Combat Federation. He is a former Flogger Series Flyweight champion. He has previously competed on ONE Championship.

== Professional career ==
=== Early career ===
Khan made his professional debut on February 13, 2022 against Syed Haider Ali. Khan won the fight via a first-round submission.

=== Flogger Series Flyweight Champion ===
After accumulating a record of 2–0, Khan faced Shirzad Azatullah for the vacant Flogger Series Flyweight Championship on August 14, 2022. Khan won the fight via knockout four seconds into the fight, and thus winning his first career championship.

=== One Championship ===
After accumulating a career record of 5–0, Khan made his debut under Singaporean-based federation ONE Championship against Cho Joon-gun on September 15, 2023. Khan won the fight via a third-round submission.

His next fight came three months later on December 15 against Rabindra Dhant. Khan won the fight via Unanimous Decision.

His last fight under the federation came on March 8, 2024 against Yryskeldi Duisheev. Khan lost the fight via a first-round submission.

=== Brave Combat Federation ===
On March 27, 2024, Khan signed with Bahraini-based federation Brave Combat Federation. He made his debut on August 18, 2024 where he faced Bagylan Zhakansha. Khan won the fight via a second-round submission.

His next fight came four months later on December 15 against Yadwinder Singh. Khan won the fight via Unanimous Decision.

=== Pakistan Combat Night ===
Khan returned to fight in his native Pakistan on August 24, 2025 against Zubair Khan. Ismail won the fight via a first-round submission.

=== Return to Brave Combat Federation ===
Khan is scheduled to return to Brave Combat Federation on October 3, 2025 where he faced Elmir Jafarov. Khan won the fight via a first-round submission.

== Championships and accomplishments ==
=== Mixed martial arts ===
- Flogger Series
  - FS Flyweight championship (One time; former)

== Mixed martial arts record ==
Professional record breakdown
13 matches	12 wins	1 loss
By knockout	2	0
By submission	7	1
By decision	3	0

Res.	Record	Opponent	Method	Event	Date	Round	Time	Location	Notes
Win	12–1	Rayimbek Tazhibaev	Technical Submission (arm-triangle choke)	Brave CF 103	December 23, 2025	2	2:48	Bukhara, Uzbekistan	Catchweight (130 lb) bout.
Win	11–1	Elmir Jafarov	Submission (rear-naked choke)	Brave CF: Georgia vs. The World	October 3, 2025	1	3:30	Tbilisi, Georgia	Catchweight (131 lb) bout.
Win	10–1	Zubair Khan	Submission (brabo choke)	Pakistan Combat Night: Road to Brave 100	August 24, 2025	1	3:43	Lahore, Pakistan	
Win	9–1	Yadwinder Singh	Decision (unanimous)	Brave CF 92	December 15, 2024	3	5:00	Isa Town, Bahrain	
Win	8–1	Bagylan Zhakansha	Submission (rear-naked choke)	Brave CF 85	August 18, 2024	2	2:22	Lahore, Pakistan	Flyweight bout.
Loss	7–1	Yryskeldi Duisheev	Submission (rear-naked choke)	ONE Friday Fights 54	March 8, 2024	1	4:30	Bangkok, Thailand	
Win	7–0	Rabindra Dhant	Decision (unanimous)	ONE Friday Fights 45	December 15, 2023	3	5:00	Bangkok, Thailand	
Win	6–0	Cho Joon-gun	Submission (rear-naked choke)	ONE Friday Fights 33	September 15, 2023	3	1:10	Bangkok, Thailand	Bantamweight debut.
Win	5–0	Serkhan Valili	Submission (arm triangle choke)	Qadya MMA 3	June 23, 2023	1	1:18	New Cairo, Egypt	
Win	4–0	Gerlan Rodrigues	Decision (unanimous)	Qadya MMA 2	November 5, 2022	3	5:00	Cairo, Egypt	
Win	3–0	Shirzad Azatullah	KO (punch)	Flogger Series 8	August 14, 2022	1	0:04	Islamabad, Pakistan	Won the vacant FS Flyweight Championship.
Win	2–0	Hassan Mohamed Abo Ali	TKO (punches)	Legacy Fight Series 1	March 27, 2022	2	4:07	Karachi, Pakistan	
Win	1–0	Syed Haider Ali	Submission (rear-naked choke)	Flogger Series 7	February 13, 2022	1	1:29	Islamabad, Pakistan	Flyweight debut.
