= Pavel Dailidko =

Lithuanian mixed martial artist (born 1991)

- Born: July 14, 1991 (age 35); Vilnius, Lithuania
- Other names: The Experiment
- Height: 6 ft 4 in (1.93 m)
- Weight: 235 lb (107 kg; 16 st 11 lb)
- Division: Heavyweight (2021–present)
- Reach: N/A
- Stance: Orthodox
- Fighting out of: Boston, England
- Team: BA Army
- Years active: 2021–present

Mixed martial arts record
- Total: 14
- Wins: 12
- By knockout: 12
- By submission: 0
- By decision: 0
- Losses: 2
- By knockout: 2
- By decision: 0

Other information
- Mixed martial arts record from Sherdog

Pavel Dailidko (born July 14, 1991) is a Lithuanian professional mixed martial artist. He is the inaugural and current Brave CF Heavyweight Champion. He is a former Caged Steel Heavyweight Champion.

== Professional career ==
=== Early career ===
Dailidko made his professional debut on August 7, 2021, against Louie Sutherland. Dailidko lost the fight via a first-round knockout.

=== Caged Steel ===
Dailidko made his debut under Caged Steel on December 4, 2021, against Ben Schneider. Dailidko won the fight via a first-round knockout.

His next fight came on March 19, 2022, against Jan Lysak. Dailidko won the fight via a knockout.

=== Kosova Fight Series ===
Dailidko made his debut under Kosova Fight Series on August 1, 2022, against Erçin Şirin. Dailidko won the fight via a first-round TKO.

=== Return to Caged Steel ===
==== Caged Steel Heavyweight Champion ====
Dailidko returned to Caged Steel on September 17, 2022, where he faced Charlie Milner for the vacant Caged Steel Heavyweight Championship. Dailidko won the fight via a first-round TKO winning his first career championship.

=== Brave Combat Federation ===
Dailidko made his debut under Brave Combat Federation on October 28, 2022, against Shamil Gaziev. Dailidko lost the fight via a second-round knockout.

His next fight came on April 23, 2023, against Luka Podkrajšek. Dailidko won the fight via a first-round knockout.

His next fight came on September 7, 2023, against Salim El Ouassaidi. Dailidko won the fight via a first-round TKO.

His next fight came on December 8, 2023, against Janos Csukas. Dailidko won the fight after Csukas suffered a knee injury thirteen seconds into the fight.

His next fight came on April 20, 2024, against Valdrin Istrefi. Dailidko won the fight via a second-round TKO.

=== Brave CF Heavyweight Champion ===
Dailidko faced Patryk Dubiela on September 28, 2024, for the inaugural Brave CF Heavyweight Championship. Dailidko won the fight via a first-round TKO, winning his second career championship, and becoming the first Heavyweight Champion in federation history.

His first title defense came on May 17, 2025, against Odie Delaney. Dailidko won the fight via a second-round TKO.

His second title defense came on October 18, 2025, against Grégory Robinet. This fight also marked his first professional fight in his native Lithuania. Dailidko won the fight via a first-round TKO.

== Championships and accomplishments ==
=== Mixed martial arts ===
- Brave Combat Federation
  - Brave CF Heavyweight Champion (One time; current)
    - Two successful title defenses
- Caged Steel
  - Caged Steel Heavyweight Champion (One time; former)

== Mixed martial arts record ==
Professional record breakdown
14 matches	12 wins	2 losses
By knockout	12	2

Res.	Record	Opponent	Method	Event	Date	Round	Time	Location	Notes
Win	12–2	Miha Frlić	TKO (punches)	Brave CF 106	June 6, 2026	1	1:20	Ljubljana, Slovenia	Defended the Brave CF Heavyweight Championship.
Win	11–2	Grégory Robinet	TKO (punches)	Brave CF 99	October 18, 2025	1	3:15	Vilnius, Lithuania	Defended the Brave CF Heavyweight Championship.
Win	10–2	Odie Delaney	TKO (punches)	Brave CF 94	May 17, 2025	2	0:57	Geneva, Switzerland	Defended the Brave CF Heavyweight Championship.
Win	9–2	Patryk Dubiela	TKO (punches)	Brave CF 88	September 28, 2024	1	4:33	Ljubljana, Slovenia	Won the inaugural Brave CF Heavyweight Championship.
Win	8–2	Valdrin Istrefi	TKO (elbows and punches)	Brave CF 81	April 20, 2024	2	1:37	Ljubljana, Slovenia	
Win	7–2	Janos Csukas	TKO (knee injury)	Brave CF 79	December 8, 2023	1	0:13	Isa Town, Bahrain	
Win	6–2	Salim El Ouassaidi	TKO (knees and punches)	Brave CF 74	September 7, 2023	1	4:11	Nantes, France	
Win	5–2	Luka Podkrajšek	KO (knee)	Brave CF 70	April 23, 2023	1	1:23	Ljubljana, Slovenia	
Loss	4–2	Shamil Gaziev	KO (punches)	Brave CF 65	October 28, 2022	2	0:46	Isa Town, Bahrain	
Win	4–1	Charlie Milner	TKO (punches)	Caged Steel 29	September 17, 2022	1	1:35	Doncaster, England	Won the vacant Caged Steel Heavyweight Championship.
Win	3–1	Erçin Şirin	TKO (punches)	Kosova Fighting Series 2	August 1, 2022	1	N/A	Pristina, Kosovo	
Win	2–1	Jan Lysak	TKO (referee stoppage)	Caged Steel 28	March 19, 2022	1	1:37	Doncaster, England	
Win	1–1	Ben Schneider	KO (punches)	Caged Steel 27	December 4, 2021	1	1:13	Doncaster, England	
Loss	0–1	Louie Sutherland	KO (punches)	Almighty FC 18	August 7, 2021	1	1:05	Barnsley, England	Heavyweight debut.

== See also ==
- List of male mixed martial artists
- List of current mixed martial arts champions
- List of current Brave CF fighters
