= Raul Tutarauli =

Georgian mixed martial artist (born 1992)

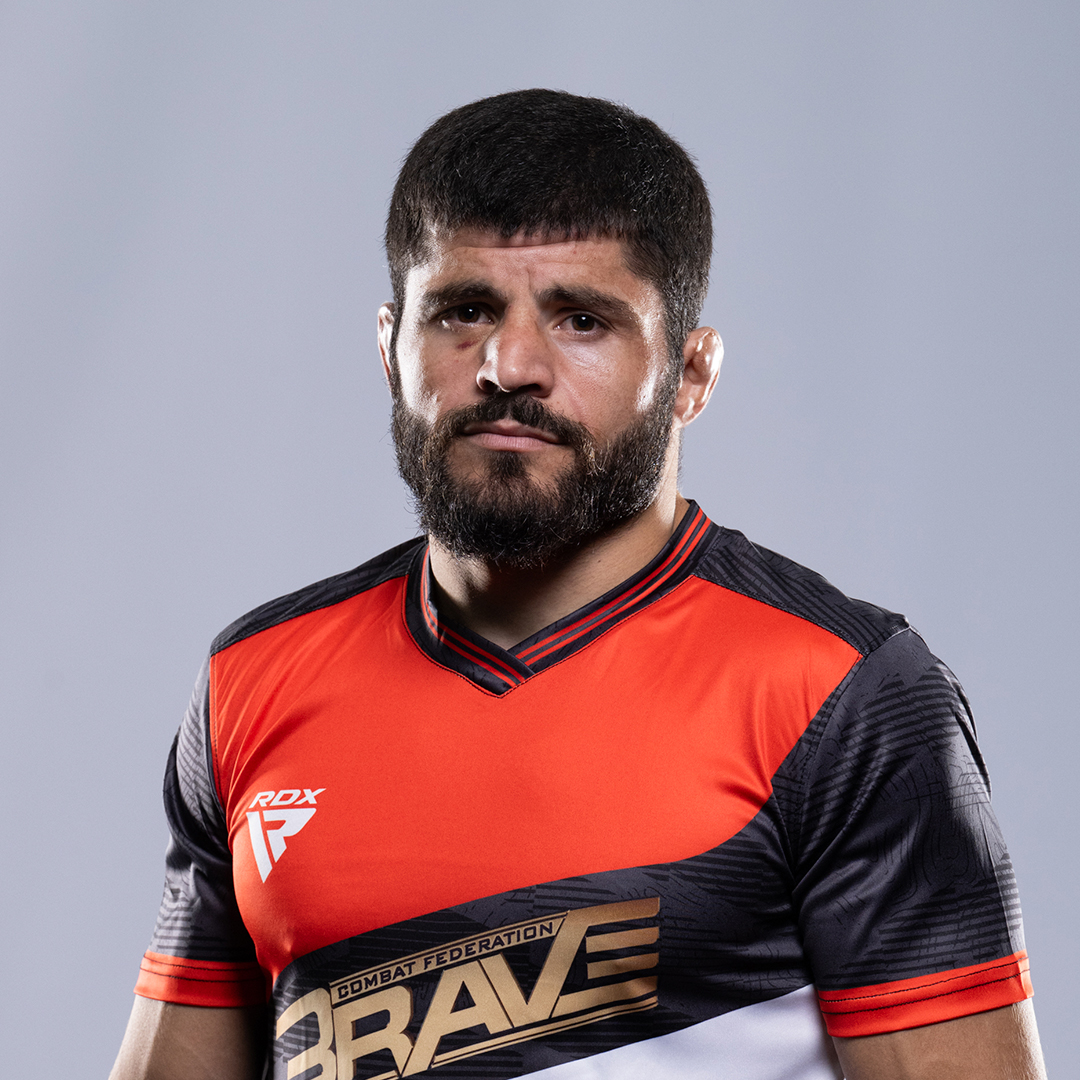
- Born: May 10, 1992 (age 34); Tbilisi, Georgia
- Native name: რაულ თუთარაული
- Height: 5 ft 6 in (1.68 m)
- Weight: 155 lb (70 kg; 11 st 1 lb)
- Division: Featherweight (2024); Lightweight (2011–present); Welterweight (2013, 2018); Light Heavyweight (2013)
- Reach: 69.3 in (176 cm)
- Fighting out of: Tbilisi, Georgia
- Team: Guram Fight Club; Spitfire Gym Berlin
- Years active: 2011–present

Mixed martial arts record
- Total: 46
- Wins: 38
- By knockout: 22
- By submission: 5
- By decision: 11
- Losses: 8
- By knockout: 1
- By submission: 4
- By decision: 3

Other information
- Mixed martial arts record from Sherdog

Raul Tutarauli (Georgian: რაულ თუთარაული; born May 10, 1992) is a Georgian professional mixed martial artist. He currently competes in the Lightweight division. He has previously competed on Brave Combat Federation, Konfrontacja Sztuk Walki, Absolute Championship Akhmat, M-1 Global, and UAE Warriors.

== Professional career ==
=== Early career ===
Tutarauli made his debut on September 17, 2011, against Giorgi Tandilashvili. Tutarauli won the fight via a first-round TKO.

=== M-1 Global ===
After accumulating a record of 7–2, Tutarauli made his debut with Russian promotion M-1 Global on February 21, 2015 against Artur Aliev. Tautarauli won the fight via a third-round submission.

=== Return to regionals ===
Tutarauli returned a month later on March 15 against Mirlan Asekov. Tutarauli won the fight via a first-round TKO.

His next fight came three months later on June 14 against Maziar Yari. Tutarauli won the fight via a first-round TKO.

=== Return to M-1 Global ===
Tutarauli returned to M-1 Global two months later on August 5 against Valeriu Mircea. Tutarauli won the fight via a first-round TKO.

His next fight came four months later on December 4 against Alexey Makhno. Tutarauli won the fight via a second-round TKO. This performance earned him his first Knockout of the Night bonus.

His next fight came five months later on May 27, 2016 against Damir Ismagulov. Tutarauli lost the fight via a third-round TKO. Despite the loss, he earned a Fight of the Night bonus.

=== UAE Warriors ===
Tutarauli made his debut with Emirati promotion UAE Warriors on September 24, 2016 against Simeon Batalov. Tutarauli won the fight via a first-round TKO.

=== Return to M-1 Global ===
After going 3–0 in the regional scene, Tutarauli returned to M-1 Global on March 3, 2017 against Mohamed Grabinski. Tutarauli won the fight via a second-round TKO.

After a one-off fight on the regionals, Tutarauli returned to M-1 Global on May 19, 2017 against Artur Lemos. Tutarauli won the fight via Unanimous Decision.

His next fight came on September 23, 2017 against Vladimir Kanunnikov. Tutarauli won the fight via Unanimous Decision.

After another one-off regional fight, Tutarauli returned to M-1 Global on February 22, 2018, where he faced Damir Ismagulov in a rematch for the M-1 Global Lightweight championship. Tutarauli lost the fight via Unanimous Decision.

After another one-off regional fight, Tutarauli returned to M-1 Global on June 15, 2018 against Roman Bogatov. Tutarauli lost the fight via a second-round submission.

His next fight came on January 26, 2019 against Yoislandy Izquierdo. Tutarauli won the fight via a first-round submission.

=== Titan Global Championship ===
Tutarauli returned to his native Georgia to fight for local promotion Titan Global Championship on May 4, 2019. He faced Masoud Moghimian. Tutarauli won the fight via a first-round TKO.

=== Final fight for M-1 Global ===
Tutarauli made his final appearance for M-1 Global on June 28, 2019 against Rubenilton Pereira. Tutarauli won the fight via a first-round TKO.

=== Absolute Championship Akhmat ===
Tutarauli made his debut with Russian promotion Absolute Championship Akhmat on November 26, 2020 against Dragoljub Stanojević. Tutarauli won the fight via a first-round TKO. This performance earned him a $5000 Stoppage Victory Bonus.

His next fight came on April 23, 2021 against Aurel Pîrtea. Tutarauli lost the fight via a second-round submission.

His next fight came five months later on September 11 against Plamen Bachvarov. Tutarauli won the fight via Unanimous Decision.

His final fight with the federation came two months later on November 19 against Herbert Batista. Tutarauli won the fight via Unanimous Decision.

=== Georgia Fighting Championship and Russian Cagefighting Championship ===
Tutarauli returned to his native Georgia to fight under the federation Georgia Fighting Championship. He faced Adil Boranbayev on June 11, 2022 for the vacant GFC Lightweight Championship. Tutarauli won the fight via a first-round TKO, and thus won his first career championship.

Tutarauli made his debut with Russian promotion Russian Cagefighting Championship on August 26, 2022 against Ali Abdulkhalikov. Tutarauli won the fight via Split Decision.

He returned to Georgia Fighting Championship for his first title defense on November 5, 2022 where he faced Oberdan Tenório. Tutarauli successfully defended his championship via a second-round TKO.

=== Konfrontacja Sztuk Walki ===
Tutarauli made his debut with Polish promotion Konfrontacja Sztuk Walki on January 21, 2023 against Roman Szymański. Tutarauli lost the fight via a first-round submission.

He returned on May 13, 2023 against Donovan Desmae. Tutarauli won the fight via Unanimous Decision.

His final fight with the federation came on December 16, 2023 against Marcin Held. Tutarauli won the fight via a second-round TKO.

=== Return to Georgian Fighting Championship and Brave Combat Federation ===
Tutarauli returned to Georgian Fighting Championship on May 11, 2024 where he faced Andrey Augusto for the vacant GFC Featherweight Championship. Tutarauli won the fight via a fourth-round submission, and thus claimed his second career championship.

Tutarauli made his debut with Bahraini-based promotion Brave Combat Federation on September 22, 2024, where he faced Abdisalam Kubanychbek for Kubanychbek's Brave CF Lightweight Championship. Tutarauli lost the fight via Unanimous Decision.

He returned to Georgian Fighting Championship on December 14, 2024 where he faced Paulo Henrique Laia for the vacant GFC Lightweight Championship. Tutarauli won the fight via a first-round submission, and thus became a two-time GFC Lightweight champion, and won his third career championship.

He returned to Brave Combat Federation on April 18, 2025 where he faced Olzhas Eskaraev. Tutarauli won the fight via Unanimous Decision.

==== BRAVE CF Interim Lightweight Champion ====
His next fight came on October 3, 2025 where he faced Pieter Buist for the interim Brave CF Lightweight Championship. Tutarauli won the fight via Unanimous Decision, and thus won the championship in the process.

== Championships and accomplishments ==
=== Mixed martial arts ===
- Brave Combat Federation
  - Brave CF Interim Lightweight Championship (One time; current)
- Georgian Fighting Championship
  - GFC Lightweight championship (Two times; former)
    - One successful title defense
  - GFC Featherweight championship (One time; former)
- M-1 Global
  - Fight of the Night (One time)
  - Knockout of the Night (One time)
- Absolute Championship Akhmat
  - $5000 Stoppage Victory Bonus (One time)

== Mixed martial arts record ==
Professional record breakdown
46 matches	38 wins	8 losses
By knockout	22	1
By submission	5	4
By decision	11	3

Res.	Record	Opponent	Method	Event	Date	Round	Time	Location	Notes
Win	38–8	Chris Gonzalez	Decision (unanimous)	Rkena FC 3	May 16, 2026	3	5:00	Tbilisi, Georgia	
Win	37–8	Pieter Buist	Decision (unanimous)	Brave CF: Georgia vs. The World	October 3, 2025	3	5:00	Tbilisi, Georgia	Won the interim Brave CF Lightweight Championship.
Win	36–8	Olzhas Eskaraev	Decision (unanimous)	Brave CF 93	April 18, 2025	3	5:00	Zhengzhou, China	
Win	35–8	Paulo Henrique Laia	Submission (rear-naked choke)	Georgian FC 29	December 14, 2024	1	3:06	Tbilisi, Georgia	Won the vacant GFC Lightweight championship.
Loss	34–8	Abdisalam Kubanychbek	Decision (unanimous)	Brave CF 87	September 22, 2024	5	5:00	Alkmaar, Netherlands	Return to Lightweight. For the Brave CF Lightweight Championship.
Win	34–7	Andrey Augusto	Submission (armbar)	Georgian FC 27	May 11, 2024	4	4:17	Tbilisi, Georgia	Featherweight debut. Won the vacant GFC Featherweight Championship.
Win	33–7	Marcin Held	TKO (punches)	KSW 89	December 16, 2023	2	3:49	Gliwice, Poland	
Win	32–7	Donovan Desmae	Decision (unanimous)	KSW 82	May 13, 2023	3	5:00	Warsaw, Poland	
Loss	31–7	Roman Szymański	Submission (armbar)	KSW 78	January 21, 2023	1	1:05	Szczecin, Poland	
Win	31–6	Oberdan Tenório	TKO	Georgian FC 18	November 5, 2022	2	4:10	Tbilisi, Georgia	Defended the GFC Lightweight Championship.
Win	30–6	Ali Abdulkhalikov	Decision (split)	RCC 12	August 26, 2022	3	5:00	Yekaterinburg, Russia	
Win	29–6	Adil Boranbayev	TKO (punches)	Georgian FC 16	June 11, 2022	1	2:20	Tbilisi, Georgia	Won the vacant GFC Lightweight Championship.
Win	28–6	Herbert Batista	Decision (unanimous)	ACA 132	November 19, 2021	3	5:00	Minsk, Belarus	
Win	27–6	Plamen Bachvarov	Decision (unanimous)	ACA 128	September 11, 2021	3	5:00	Minsk, Belarus	
Loss	26–6	Aurel Pîrtea	Submission (guillotine choke)	ACA 122	April 23, 2021	2	3:38	Minsk, Belarus	
Win	26–5	Dragoljub Stanojević	KO (knees and punches)	ACA 114	November 26, 2020	1	0:14	Łódź, Poland	
Win	25–5	Rubenilton Pereira	KO (punches)	M-1 Challenge 102	June 28, 2019	1	1:37	Astana, Kazakhstan	
Win	24–5	Masoud Moghimian	TKO	TGC 1	May 4, 2019	1	N/A	Tbilisi, Georgia	
Win	23–5	Yoislandy Izquierdo	Submission (rear-naked choke)	M-1 Challenge 100	January 26, 2019	3	3:47	Shenzhen, China	
Loss	22–5	Roman Bogatov	Technical Submission (Von Flue choke)	M-1 Challenge 94	June 15, 2018	2	3:05	Orenburg, Russia	
Win	22–4	Zhou Peng	TKO (punches)	Chin Woo Men: 2017-2018 Season, Stage 6	March 11, 2018	1	1:07	Guangzhou, China	
Loss	21–4	Damir Ismagulov	Decision (unanimous)	M-1 Challenge 88	February 22, 2018	5	5:00	Moscow, Russia	Return to Lightweight. For the M-1 Global Lightweight Championship.
Win	21–3	Liu Huanan	TKO (punches)	Chin Woo Men: 2017-2018 Season, Stage 4	January 21, 2018	1	1:23	Hefei, China	Return to Welterweight.
Win	20–3	Vladimir Kanunnikov	Decision (unanimous)	M-1 Challenge 83	September 23, 2017	3	5:00	Kazan, Russia	
Win	19–3	Artur Lemos	Decision (unanimous)	M-1 Challenge 77	May 19, 2017	3	5:00	Sochi, Russia	
Win	18–3	Missael Silva de Souza	KO (punch)	Chin Woo Men: 2016-2017 Season, Stage 8	May 13, 2017	1	1:13	Loudi, China	
Win	17–3	Marcel Mohamed Grabinski	TKO (punches)	M-1 Challenge 75	March 3, 2017	2	3:50	Moscow, Russia	
Win	16–3	Wang Yusheng	TKO (punches)	Chin Woo Men: 2016-2017 Season, Stage 4	January 8, 2017	1	1:39	Guangzhou, China	
Win	15–3	Bao Yinchang	Decision (unanimous)	Glory of Heroes 10: Conquest of Heroes	December 2, 2016	3	5:00	Jiyuan, China	
Win	14–3	Cheng Zhao	TKO (punches)	Chin Woo Men: 2016-2017 Season, Stage 1	November 6, 2016	1	4:23	Guangzhou, China	
Win	13–3	Simeon Batalov	TKO (slam and punches)	Road to Abu Dhabi Warriors: Bulgaria	September 24, 2016	1	1:03	Sofia, Bulgaria	
Loss	12–3	Damir Ismagulov	TKO (punches)	M-1 Challenge 66	May 27, 2016	3	3:49	Orenburg, Russia	Fight of the Night.
Win	12–2	Alexey Makhno	TKO (punches)	M-1 Challenge 63	December 4, 2015	2	1:29	Saint Petersburg, Russia	Knockout of the Night.
Win	11–2	Valeriu Mircea	TKO (punches)	M-1 Challenge 60	August 5, 2015	1	3:18	Oryol, Russia	
Win	10–2	Maziar Yari	TKO (punches)	Armenian FC 14	June 14, 2015	1	2:03	Yerevan, Armenia	
Win	9–2	Mirlan Asekov	TKO (punches)	WEF Global 2	March 15, 2015	1	4:40	Bishkek, Kyrgyzstan	
Win	8–2	Artur Aliev	Submission (rear-naked choke)	M-1 Challenge 55	February 21, 2015	3	1:45	Tbilisi, Georgia	
Win	7–2	Elchin Gasimov	KO (punch)	Universal Fighting Club: International MMA Akhaltsikhe 2014	October 19, 2014	1	1:36	Akhaltsikhe, Georgia	
Win	6–2	Khasid Noruzov	KO (spinning back kick)	Guram Fight Club: Fight Night 2	June 7, 2014	1	0:34	Tbilisi, Georgia	Return to Lightweight.
Loss	5–2	Gamlet Dryaev	Submission (guillotine choke)	Oplot Challenge 93	December 21, 2013	1	1:24	Kharkiv, Ukraine	Welterweight debut.
Loss	5–1	Dzhikhad Yunusov	Decision (unanimous)	Oplot Challenge 88	November 16, 2013	3	5:00	Kharkiv, Ukraine	
Win	5–0	Maxim Pashkov	TKO (punches)	Oplot Challenge 83	October 12, 2013	1	4:45	Kharkiv, Ukraine	
Win	4–0	Muhamed Majidi	Submission (rear-naked choke)	Guram Fight Club: Fight Night 1	September 18, 2013	1	0:40	Tbilisi, Georgia	
Win	3–0	Misha Maskharashvili	TKO (punches)	Georgian Universal Fighting Federation: Batubi Circus	August 6, 2012	1	2:11	Batumi, Georgia	
Win	2–0	Miika Goriashvili	Decision (unanimous)	Georgian Universal Fighting Federation: Georgian 3rd Tournament	November 5, 2011	3	5:00	Tbilisi, Georgia	
Win	1–0	Giorgi Tandilashvili	TKO (punches)	Georgian Universal Fighting Federation	September 17, 2011	1	0:46	Gori, Georgia	Lightweight debut.
