= 2024 in Brave Combat Federation =

Brave Combat Federation
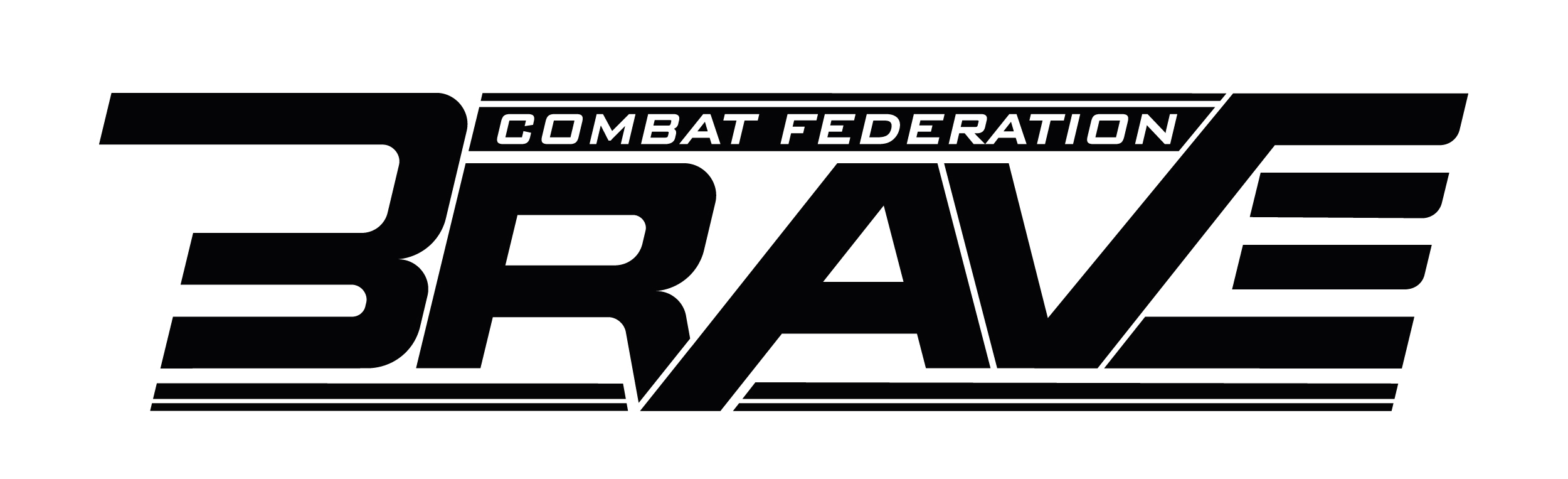

Information
- First date: April 20, 2024
- Last date: December 15, 2024

Events
- Total events: 12

Fights
- Total fights: 96
- Title fights: 6

The year 2024 was the 9th year in the history of the Brave Combat Federation, a mixed martial arts promotion based in Bahrain.

== List of events ==
| No. | Event | Date | Venue | Location |
|---|---|---|---|---|
| 1 | BRAVE CF 81 | April 20, 2024 | Hala Tivoli | Ljubljana, Slovenia |
| 2 | BRAVE CF 82 | May 11, 2024 | Côte D'Or National Sports Complex | Saint Pierre, Mauritius |
| 3 | BRAVE CF 83 | May 25, 2024 | N/A | Alkmaar, Netherlands |
| 4 | BRAVE CF 84 | August 9, 2024 | N/A | Zhengzhou, China |
| 5 | BRAVE CF 85 | August 18, 2024 | N/A | Lahore, Pakistan |
| 6 | BRAVE CF 86 | August 24, 2024 | N/A | Burgas, Bulgaria |
| 7 | BRAVE CF 87 | September 22, 2024 | N/A | Alkmaar, Netherlands |
| 8 | BRAVE CF 88 | September 28, 2024 | Hala Tivoli | Ljubljana, Slovenia |
| 9 | BRAVE CF 89 | October 19, 2024 | Pabellon Santiago Martin | Tenerife, Spain |
| 10 | BRAVE CF 90 | November 23, 2024 | Multiversum | Vienna, Austria |
| 11 | BRAVE CF 91 | December 13, 2024 | Khalifa Sports City Stadium | Isa Town, Bahrain |
| 12 | BRAVE CF 92 | December 15, 2024 | Khalifa Sports City Stadium | Isa Town, Bahrain |

== BRAVE CF 81 ==
BRAVE CF 81
- Promotion: Brave Combat Federation
- Date: April 20, 2024
- Venue: Hala Tivoli
- City: Ljubljana, Slovenia

BRAVE CF 81 was a mixed martial arts event to held by Brave Combat Federation on April 20, 2024 at the Hala Tivoli in Ljubljana, Slovenia.

=== Background ===
A light heavyweight bout between Erko Jun and Mohamed Said Maalem headlined the event.

=== Results ===
BRAVE CF 81
| Weight Class | | | | Method | Round | Time | Notes |
|---|---|---|---|---|---|---|---|
| Light Heavyweight 93 kg | (Bosnia and Herzegovina) Erko Jun | def. | (Algeria) Mohamed Said Maalem | KO (Punches) | 1 | 3:06 | |
| Super Lightweight 75 kg | (Germany) Christian Mach | def. | (Slovenia) David Forster | Decision (Unanimous) | 3 | 5:00 | |
| Heavyweight 120 kg | (Lithuania) Pavel Dailidko | def. | (Liechtenstein) Valdrin Istrefi | TKO (Elbows and Punches) | 2 | 1:37 | |
| Women's Strawweight 52 kg | (Slovenia) Monika Kučinič | def. | (Georgia (country)) Sofiia Bagishvili | Submission (Armbar) | 3 | 1:54 | |
Preliminary Card
| Heavyweight 120 kg | (Slovenia) Haris Aksalič | def. | (Turkey) Baki Şahin | KO (Punches) | 1 | 4:27 | |
| Heavyweight 120 kg | (Poland) Patryk Dubiela | def. | (Turkey) Kasim Aras | TKO (Punches) | 1 | 0:48 | |
| Super Welterweight 79 kg | (Slovenia) Domen Drnovsek | def. | (Italy) Andrian Murug | Submission (Armbar) | 1 | 3:14 | |
| Flyweight 57 kg | (Republic of Ireland) Gerard Burns | def. | (Serbia) Danijel Špoljarić | TKO (Submission to Punches | 1 | 4:56 | |

== BRAVE CF 82 ==
BRAVE CF 82
- Promotion: Brave Combat Federation
- Date: May 11, 2024
- Venue: Côte D'Or National Sports Complex
- City: Saint Pierre, Mauritius

BRAVE CF 82 was a mixed martial arts event held by Brave Combat Federation on May 11, 2024 in Saint Pierre, Mauritius.

=== Results ===
BRAVE CF 82
| Weight Class | | | | Method | Round | Time | Notes |
|---|---|---|---|---|---|---|---|
| Bantamweight 61 kg | (South Africa) Nkosi Ndebele (c) | def. | (United States) Jose Torres | Decision (Unanimous) | 5 | 5:00 | For the BRAVE CF Bantamweight Championship. |
| Bantamweight 61 kg | (Zimbabwe) Nicholas Hwende | def. | (Tajikistan) Hurshed Nazarov | Decision (Unanimous) | 3 | 5:00 | |
| Featherweight 66 kg | (France) Ylies Djiroun | def. | (Democratic Republic of the Congo) Ananias Mulumba | Technical Submission (Guillotine Choke) | 1 | 1:39 | |
| Lightweight 70 kg | (Bahrain) Ramazan Gitinov | def. | (Democratic Republic of the Congo) Prince Lolia | Submission (Arm-Triangle Choke) | 1 | 1:35 | |

== BRAVE CF 83 ==
BRAVE CF 83
- Promotion: Brave Combat Federation
- Date: May 25, 2024
- Venue: N/A
- City: Alkmaar, Netherlands

BRAVE CF 83 was a mixed martial arts event held by Brave Combat Federation on May 25, 2024 in Alkmaar, Netherlands.

=== Results ===
BRAVE CF 83
| Weight Class | | | | Method | Round | Time | Notes |
|---|---|---|---|---|---|---|---|
| Super Welterweight 79 kg | (France) Alex Lohoré | def. | (Poland) Marcin Bandel | TKO (Punches) | 1 | 1:10 | |
| Middleweight 84 kg | (Suriname) Noach Blyden | def. | (Poland) Oskar Herczyk | KO (Punch to the Body) | 1 | 4:17 | |
| Lightweight 70 kg | (Morocco) Youssef Boughanem | def. | (Netherlands) Anando Amoksi | TKO (Punches) | 2 | 2:10 | |
| Bantamweight 61 kg | (Qatar) Magomed Idrisov | def. | (Azerbaijan) Zaka Fatullazade | Submission (Arm-Triangle Choke) | 1 | 3:04 | |
| Super Welterweight 79 kg | (Netherlands) Chequina Noso Pedro | def. | (Austria) Ali Isajew | Submission (Anaconda Choke) | 2 | 4:36 | |

== BRAVE CF 84 ==
BRAVE CF 84
- Promotion: Brave Combat Federation
- Date: August 9, 2024
- Venue: N/A
- City: Zhengzhou, China

BRAVE CF 84 was a mixed martial arts event held by Brave Combat Federation on August 9, 2024 in Zhengzhou, China.

=== Results ===
BRAVE CF 84
| Weight Class | | | | Method | Round | Time | Notes |
|---|---|---|---|---|---|---|---|
| Catchweight 59.2 kg | (Georgia (country)) Bidzina Gavashelishvili | def. | (Kazakhstan) Erasyl Shukataev | Decision (unanimous) | 3 | 5:00 | |
| Catchweight 62.5 kg | (France) Brice Picaud | def. | (China) Zhang Qinghe | TKO (retirement) | 2 | 5:00 | |
| Bantamweight 61 kg | (Serbia) Borislav Nikolić | def. | (China) Eqiyuebu | TKO (elbows and punches) | 1 | 4:50 | |
| Featherweight 66 kg | (Jordan) Izzeddine Al Derbani | def. | (China) Keremuaili Maimaitituoheti | Submission (triangle choke) | 1 | 3:49 | Al Derbani missed weight (68.25 kg). |
| Lightweight 70 kg | (Kazakhstan) Olzhas Eskaraev | def. | (China) Zhang Zehao | Decision (unanimous) | 3 | 5:00 | |
| Flyweight 57 kg | (China) Yang Weiqiang | def. | (Bahrain) Mohamed Alsameea | Decision (unanimous) | 3 | 5:00 | |
| Catchweight 64.5 kg | (Kazakhstan) Aivaz Aidinov | def. | (China) Peng Zhengwen | Decision (unanimous) | 3 | 5:00 | |

== BRAVE CF 85 ==
BRAVE CF 85
- Promotion: Brave Combat Federation
- Date: August 18, 2024
- City: Lahore, Pakistan

BRAVE CF 85 was a mixed martial arts event held by Brave Combat Federation on August 18, 2024 in Lahore, Pakistan.

=== Results ===
BRAVE CF 85
| Weight Class | | | | Method | Round | Time | Notes |
|---|---|---|---|---|---|---|---|
| Featherweight 66 kg | (Kazakhstan) Rauan Bekbolat | def. | (Ukraine) Omar Solomanov | Submission (Guillotine Choke) | 3 | 0:50 | |
| Lightweight 71 kg | (Pakistan) Rizwan Ali | def. | (India) Srikant Sekhar | TKO (Punches) | 3 | 3:33 | |
| Super Welterweight 79 kg | (Democratic Republic of the Congo) Eliezer Kubanza | def. | (Kyrgyzstan) Salamat Orozakunov | TKO (Punches) | 1 | 4:33 | |
| Flyweight 57 kg | (Pakistan) Ismail Khan | def. | (Kazakhstan) Bagylan Zhakansha | Submission (Rear-Naked Choke) | 2 | 2:22 | |
| Bantamweight 61 kg | (Georgia (country)) Lasha Abramishvili | def. | (Bahrain) Magomed Idrisov | TKO (Punches) | 2 | 2:16 | |
| Bantamweight 61 kg | (Pakistan) Zia Mashwani | def. | (India) Bharat Khandare | Technical Submission (Triangle Choke) | 1 | 1:40 | |
| Flyweight 57 kg | (Philippines) Marwin Quirante | def. | (Pakistan) Awan Aqib | KO (Front Kick) | 1 | 0:18 | |
| Super Lightweight 75 kg | (Bahrain) Abbas Khan | def. | (Egypt) Adham Mohamed | Decision (Unanimous) | 3 | 5:00 | |
| Super Lightweight 75 kg | (Bahrain) Murad Guseinov | def. | (Kazakhstan) Ruslan Serikpulov | TKO (Punches) | 1 | 2:04 | |
| Bantamweight 61 kg | (Iran) Mojtaba Nasiri | def. | (Nepal) Yuki Angdembe | Submission (Shoulder Choke) | 3 | 3:12 | |

== BRAVE CF 86 ==
BRAVE CF 86
- Promotion: Brave Combat Federation
- Date: August 24, 2024
- City: Burgas, Bulgaria

BRAVE CF 86 was a mixed martial arts event held by Brave Combat Federation on August 24, 2024 in Burgas, Bulgaria.

=== Fight card ===
BRAVE CF 86
| Weight Class | | | | Method | Round | Time | Notes |
|---|---|---|---|---|---|---|---|
| Light Heavyweight 93 kg | (Algeria) Mohamed Said Maalem | def. | (Bulgaria) Atanas Djambazov | TKO (Punches) | 3 | 3:15 | |
| Super Welterweight 79 kg | (France) Alex Lohoré | def. | (Bulgaria) Jivko Stoimenov | TKO (Punches) | 1 | 4:03 | |
| Lightweight 70 kg | (Bulgaria) Pavel Vladev | def. | (Germany) Christian Mach | TKO (Punches) | 2 | 4:50 | |
| Catchweight 76 kg | (Turkey) Khamzat Maaev | def. | (Bulgaria) Antonio Bushev | Submission (Triangle Choke) | 1 | 1:50 | |
| Lightweight 70 kg | (Bulgaria) Rusi Minev | def. | (Greece) Christos Tsirimokos | Decision (Unanimous) | 3 | 5:00 | |
| Catchweight 68 kg | (Germany) Eduard Evdokimov | def. | (Brazil) Gabriel Gilthon | TKO (Body Kick and Punches) | 3 | 2:59 | |
| Lightweight 70 kg | (Bulgaria) Anton Yanchev | def. | (Poland) Patryk Krzak | Submission (Rear-Naked Choke) | 1 | 2:47 | |

== BRAVE CF 87 ==
BRAVE CF 87
- Promotion: Brave Combat Federation
- Date: September 22, 2024
- City: Alkmaar, Netherlands

BRAVE CF 87 was a mixed martial arts event held by Brave Combat Federation on September 22, 2024 in Alkmaar, Netherlands.

=== Fight card ===
BRAVE CF 87
| Weight Class | | | | Method | Round | Time | Notes |
|---|---|---|---|---|---|---|---|
| Lightweight 70 kg | (Kyrgyzstan) Abdisalam Kubanychbek (c) | def. | (Georgia (country)) Raul Tutarauli | Decision (Unanimous) | 5 | 5:00 | For the BRAVE CF Lightweight Championship |
| Middleweight 84 kg | (Netherlands) Noach Blyden | def. | (Poland) Adrian Gralak | TKO (Knees and Punches) | 1 | 4:55 | |
| Lightweight 70 kg | (Afghanistan) Zabiullah Mubarez | def. | (Netherlands) Nabil Haryouli | Decision (Unanimous) | 3 | 5:00 | |
| Middleweight 84 kg | (Suriname) Clyde Brunswijk | def. | (Romania) Mădălin Pîrvulescu | Submission (Ninja Choke) | 3 | 3:13 | |
| Light Heavyweight 93 kg | (Bahrain) Rasul Magomedov | def. | (Brazil) Pablo Benaion | TKO (Punches) | 1 | 2:18 | |

== BRAVE CF 88 ==
BRAVE CF 88
- Promotion: Brave Combat Federation
- Date: September 28, 2024
- Venue: Hala Tivoli
- City: Ljubljana, Slovenia

BRAVE CF 88 was a mixed martial arts event held by Brave Combat Federation on September 28, 2024 at the Hala Tivoli in Ljubljana, Slovenia.

=== Fight card ===
BRAVE CF 88
| Weight Class | | | | Method | Round | Time | Notes |
|---|---|---|---|---|---|---|---|
| Light Heavyweight 93 kg | (Bosnia and Herzegovina) Erko Jun | def. | (Germany) Alexander Wesner | TKO (Leg Kick and Punches) | 4 | 1:27 | For the BRAVE CF Light Heavyweight Championship. |
| Heavyweight 120 kg | (Lithuania) Pavel Dailidko | def. | (Poland) Patryk Dubiela | TKO (Punches) | 1 | 4:33 | For the BRAVE CF Heavyweight Championship. |
| Women's Strawweight 52 kg | (Slovenia) Monika Kučinič | def. | (Italy) Fabiola Pidroni | Decision (Split) | 3 | 5:00 | |
| Heavyweight 120 kg | (Slovenia) Luka Podkrajšek | def. | (Italy) Michele Mirabella | TKO (Punches) | 1 | 3:24 | |
| Heavyweight 120 kg | (Slovenia) Miha Frlić | def. | (Italy) Samuele Di Guardo | TKO (Punches) | 1 | 0:37 | |
| Super Lightweight 75 kg | (Estonia) Kristjan Toniste | def. | (Slovenia) Domen Drnovsek | Decision (Unanimous) | 3 | 5:00 | |
| Women's Strawweight 52 kg | (Serbia) Marina Spasić | def. | (Brazil) Maristela Alves | TKO (Punches) | 3 | 2:11 | |
| Amateur Welterweight 77 kg | (Slovenia) Kirill Negru | def. | (Italy) Ilia Sinani | Decision (Unanimous) | 3 | 3:00 | |

== BRAVE CF 89 ==
BRAVE CF 89
- Promotion: Brave Combat Federation
- Date: October 19, 2024
- Venue: Pabellon Santiago Martin
- City: Tenerife, Spain

BRAVE CF 89 was a mixed martial arts event held by Brave Combat Federation on October 19, 2024 at the Pabellon Santiago Martin in Tenerife, Spain.

=== Results ===
BRAVE CF 89
| Weight Class | | | | Method | Round | Time | Notes |
|---|---|---|---|---|---|---|---|
| Super Welterweight 79.5 kg | (Brazil) Luiz Cado | def. | (Russia) Kamal Magomedov (c) | Disqualification (Elbows to Back of Head) | 2 | 0:30 | For the BRAVE CF Super Welterweight Championship |
| Featherweight 66 kg | (Republic of Ireland) Richie Smullen | def. | (Spain) Jose Sanchez | Submission (Guillotine Choke) | 1 | 0:29 | |
| Featherweight 66 kg | (Netherlands) Ilias Bulaid | def. | (Switzerland) Anthony Riggio | TKO (Leg Kick) | 1 | 4:01 | |
| Featherweight 66 kg | (Morocco) Anuar Bensayiid | def. | (Tajikistan) Sino Sabzaliev | TKO (Punch to the Body) | 3 | 2:52 | |
| Women's Atomweight 48 kg | (Spain) Andrea Meneses Garcia | def. | (Italy) Adriana Fusini | Submission (Rear-Naked Choke) | 2 | 2:06 | |
| Bantamweight 61 kg | (Republic of Ireland) Gerard Burns | def. | (Brazil) Santhiago Paiva | Decision (Unanimous) | 3 | 5:00 | |
| Lightweight 70 kg | (Spain) Oscar Mendez | def. | (Germany) Tony Sipos | Decision (Unanimous) | 3 | 5:00 | |

== BRAVE CF 90 ==
BRAVE CF 90
- Promotion: Brave Combat Federation
- Date: November 23, 2024
- Venue: Multiversum
- City: Vienna, Austria

BRAVE CF 90 is a mixed martial arts event held to be by Brave Combat Federation on November 23, 2024 at the Multiversum in Vienna, Austria.

=== Fight card ===
BRAVE CF 90
| Weight Class | | | | Method | Round | Time | Notes |
|---|---|---|---|---|---|---|---|
| Light Heavyweight 93 kg | (Qatar) Rasul Magomedov | def. | (Poland) Łukasz Olech | Decision (Unanimous) | 3 | 5:00 | |
| Lightweight 70 kg | (Russia) Magomed-Emin Dadaev | def. | (Germany) Davlet Karataev | TKO (Punches) | 2 | 2:17 | |
| Heavyweight 120 kg | (Croatia) Agron Smakici | def. | (Poland) Robert Maruszak | TKO (Ankle Injury) | 2 | 0:34 | |
| Catchweight 72 kg | (Belgium) Youssef Boughanem | def. | (France) Johan Van de Hel | Decision (Unanimous) | 3 | 5:00 | |
| Lightweight 70 kg | (Austria) Abubaker Soltabiev | def. | (Germany) Zabiullah Mubarez | Decision (Unanimous) | 3 | 5:00 | |
| Women's Strawweight 52 kg | (Germany) Songül Karatorak | def. | (Poland) Kinga Jendrasik | Submission (Rear-Naked Choke) | 1 | 3:13 | |
| Super Lightweight 75 kg | (Austria) Rafael Tupy | def. | (Turkey) Recep Gültekin | Decision (Unanimous) | 3 | 5:00 | |
| Women's Flyweight 57 kg | (Poland) Dominika Steczkowska | def. | (Austria) Narges Mohseni | Decision (Split) | 3 | 5:00 | |
| Lightweight 70 kg | (Austria) Abdulmalik Aliev | def. | (Germany) Anatoliy Adzhamyan | Submission (Rear-Naked Choke) | 1 | 2:52 | |
| Light Heavyweight 93 kg | (Turkey) Emir Can | def. | (Romania) Mihalache Sorin | Decision (Unanimous) | 3 | 5:00 | |

== BRAVE CF 91 ==
BRAVE CF 91
- Promotion: Brave Combat Federation
- Date: December 13, 2024
- Venue: Khalifa Sports City Stadium
- City: Isa Town, Bahrain

BRAVE CF 91 was a mixed martial arts event held by Brave Combat Federation on December 13, 2024 at the Khalifa Sports City Stadium in Isa Town, Bahrain.

=== Fight card ===
BRAVE CF 91
| Weight Class | | | | Method | Round | Time | Notes |
|---|---|---|---|---|---|---|---|
| Bantamweight 61 kg | (Zimbabwe) Nicholas Hwende | def. | (South Africa) Nkosi Ndebele (c) | Decision (unanimous) | 5 | 5:00 | For the BRAVE CF Bantamweight Championship. |
| Bantamweight 61 kg | (Bahrain) Hamza Kooheji | def. | (Turkey) Alperen Karabulut | TKO (elbows and punches) | 2 | 4:23 | Kooheji missed weight (62.5 kg). |
| Catchweight 59.2 kg | (England) Muhammad Mokaev | def. | (Philippines) Joevincent So | Submission (brabo choke) | 1 | 1:52 | |
| Flyweight 57 kg | (Kazakhstan) Dias Erengaipov | def. | (Brazil) Marciano Ferreira | Decision (unanimous) | 3 | 5:00 | |
| Super Welterweight 79.5 kg | (Democratic Republic of the Congo) Eliezer Kubanza | def. | (Bahrain) Zagid Gaidarov | Decision (unanimous) | 3 | 5:00 | |
Preliminary card
| Women's Flyweight 57 kg | (Bahrain) Sabrina de Souza | def. | (Philippines) Mariane Mariano | Submission (armbar) | 3 | 4:47 | de Souza missed weight (58.4 kg). |
| Flyweight 57 kg | (Bahrain) Mohammed Alsameea | def. | (Egypt) Salah Walid | KO (knee) | 2 | 0:33 | |
| Lightweight 70 kg | (Bahrain) Hussain Al Kurdi | def. | (Egypt) Seif Shawki | KO (knee) | 3 | 2:25 | |
| Featherweight 66 kg | (Russia) Kantemir Shibzukhov | def. | (Azerbaijan) Adam Khalilov | Decision (unanimous) | 3 | 5:00 | Shibzukhov missed weight (68.6 kg). |
Posliminary card
| Light Heavyweight 93 kg | (Russia) Ubaidula Tagirov | def. | (Belgium) Abdelliah Azzouzi | Submission (arm-triangle choke) | 1 | 3:13 | |

== BRAVE CF 92 ==
BRAVE CF 92
- Promotion: Brave Combat Federation
- Date: December 15, 2024
- Venue: Khalifa Sports City Stadium
- City: Isa Town, Bahrain

BRAVE CF 92 was a mixed martial arts event held by Brave Combat Federation on December 15, 2024 at the Khalifa Sports City Stadium in Isa Town, Bahrain.

=== Fight card ===
BRAVE CF 92
| Weight Class | | | | Method | Round | Time | Notes |
|---|---|---|---|---|---|---|---|
| Catchweight 86 kg | (Lebanon) Mohammad Fakhreddine | def. | (Algeria) Abdel Rahmane Driai | TKO (elbows and punches) | 2 | 3:11 | |
| Lightweight 70 kg | (Pakistan) Rizwan Ali | def. | (India) Srikant Sekhar | TKO (punches) | 1 | 2:22 | |
| Bantamweight 61 kg | (Pakistan) Babar Ali | def. | (India) Mohammad Farhad | Decision (unanimous) | | | |
| Featherweight 66 kg | (Ukraine) Omar Solomonov | def. | (Jordan) Izzeddine Al Derbani | Submission (rear-naked choke) | 1 | 4:53 | |
| Welterweight 77 kg | (Bahrain) Abbas Khan | def. | (India) Seth Rosario | Decision (split) | 3 | 5:00 | |
| Super Welterweight 79.5 kg | (Lebanon) Rami Hamed | def. | (Kyrgyzstan) Salamat Orozakunov | KO (punches) | 1 | 4:20 | |
| Super Lightweight 75 kg | (Egypt) Abdallah Mohamed | def. | (Bahrain) Mohamed Yosif Abdulrahman | Decision (unanimous) | 3 | 5:00 | |
| Bantamweight 61 kg | (Pakistan) Ismail Khan | def. | (India) Yadwinder Singh | Decision (unanimous) | 3 | 5:00 | |
| Flyweight 57 kg | (Pakistan) Awan Aqib | def. | (India) Ehtesham Ansari | TKO (punches) | 3 | 2:01 | |
| Women's Strawweight 52 kg | (India) Suchika Tariyal | def. | (Philippines) Jhen Buzon | Submission (armbar) | 2 | 2:08 | |

== See also ==
- List of current Brave CF fighters
- List of current mixed martial arts champions
- 2024 in UFC
- 2024 in Bellator MMA
- 2024 in ONE Championship
- 2024 in Absolute Championship Akhmat
- 2024 in Konfrontacja Sztuk Walki
- 2024 in Rizin Fighting Federation
- 2024 in LUX Fight League
- 2024 in Oktagon MMA
- 2024 in UAE Warriors
- 2024 in Legacy Fighting Alliance
