= Owais Yaqoob =

Indian mixed martial artist (born 1998)

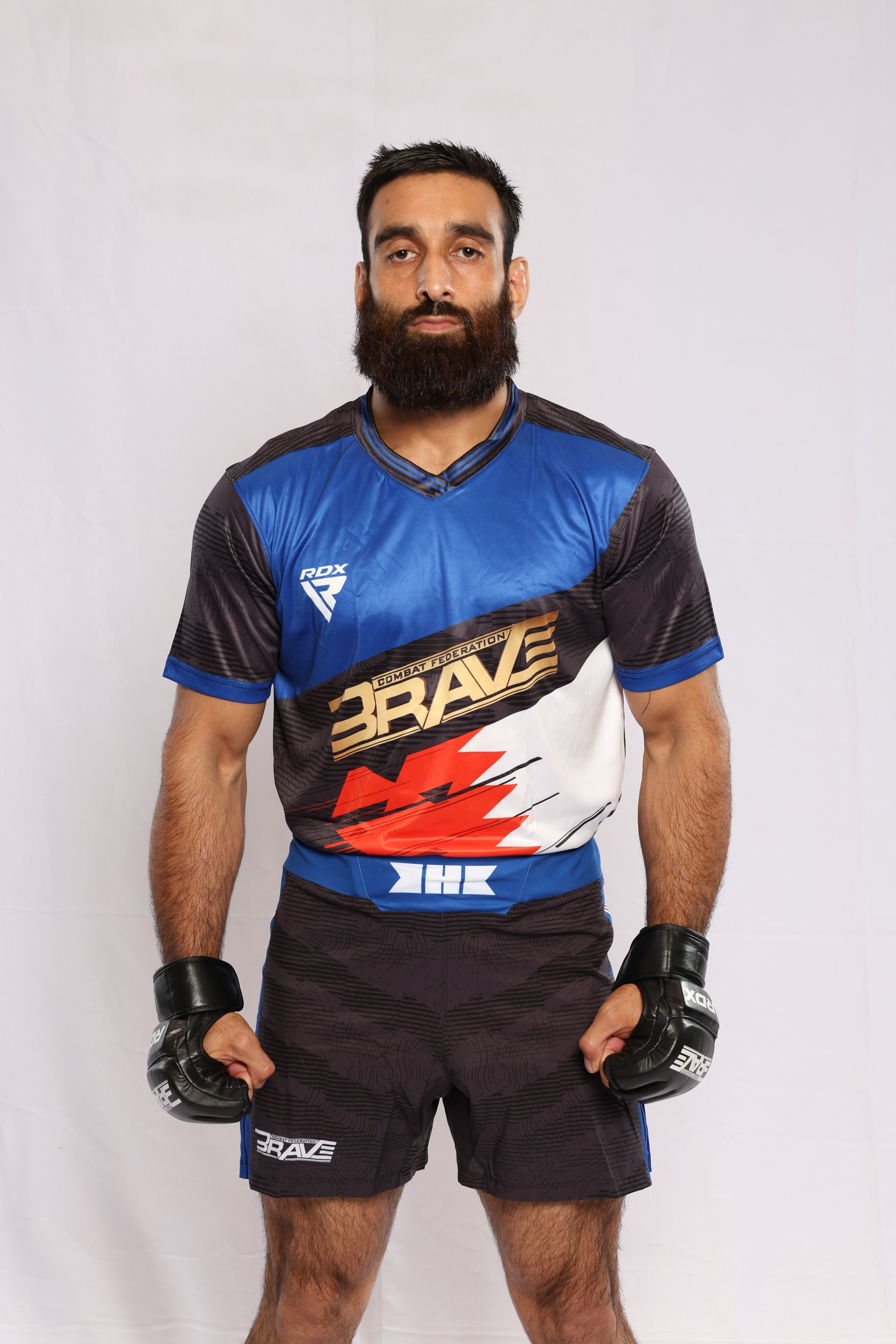
- Born: 1998 (age 27–28); Murran, Pulwama district, Jammu and Kashmir, India
- Nationality: Indian
- Height: 5 ft 7 in (1.70 m)
- Weight: 155 lb (70 kg)
- Division: Lightweight
- Reach: 69.7 in (177 cm)
- Fighting out of: Kashmir, India
- Team: American Kickboxing Academy; Team Khabib
- Trainer: Khabib Nurmagomedov; Javier Mendez
- Years active: 2023–present

Mixed martial arts record
- Total: 5
- Wins: 4
- By knockout: 2
- By submission: 0
- By decision: 2
- Losses: 1
- By knockout: 0
- By submission: 1
- By decision: 0
- Draws: 0
- No contests: 0

Other information
- Mixed martial arts record from Sherdog
- Last updated on: 14 November 2025

Owais Yaqoob (born 1998) is an Indian professional mixed martial artist who competes in the lightweight division. He is the first professional MMA fighter from Murran village of Pulwama district of Kashmir and trains at the American Kickboxing Academy (AKA) under Khabib Nurmagomedov and Javier Mendez. In October 2025, Nurmagomedov publicly praised Yaqoob's progress during training.

== Early life ==
Owais Yaqoob was born in 1998 in Murran village, Pulwama district, Jammu and Kashmir, India. He began training in martial arts in 2013, starting with taekwondo. Over the following decade, Yaqoob competed in national taekwondo competitions, winning 11 gold medals and six silver medals.

== Mixed martial arts career ==
Prior to turning professional, Yaqoob won three National Amateur MMA titles. He started his Amateur MMA journey in 2018 Learning MMA Wrestling/ Jiu-jitsu and Kickboxing under Coach Gurkaran Singh Sawhney at Indian Top Team(iTT) Fight Club in Chandigarh . Representing iTT he Won Multiple Amateur MMA National Championships and Eventually got selected for Tiger Shroffs Matrix Fight Night(MFN) .He also did striking and footwork at Soma Fight Club in Bali, Indonesia, and spent two months at the Abdulmanap Nurmagomedov School in Dagestan, Russia, under Khabib & Islam Makhachev which changed the trajectory of his life, MMA career and stardom.

Yaqoob made his professional MMA debut on 31 March 2023 at Matrix Fight Night 11 in New Delhi, where he lost to Neeraj Panghal via third-round submission (guillotine choke).

He secured his first professional win on 9 March 2024 against Azim Mokhlis at Matrix Fight Night 14 by unanimous decision. On 21 December 2024, Yaqoob defeated Amanzhol Khaisa via unanimous decision at Naiza FC 70 in Semey, Kazakhstan.

Yaqoob earned back-to-back knockout victories in 2025. On 19 April 2025, he stopped Shetty Pratik Sadashiv via second-round TKO (punches) at Veswa Fight Championship 4 in Panchkula, Haryana. His most recent fight, on 19 September 2025, saw him make his debut for Brave Combat Federation at BRAVE CF 98 in Zhengzhou, China, where he defeated Ian Paul Lora via first-round TKO (punches). This victory marked the first win for a fighter from Jammu and Kashmir in BRAVE CF.

In October 2023, Yaqoob was signed as a brand ambassador for Cemtac Cements, a Kashmir-based company.

Yaqoob founded Lion's Den Martial Arts Academy in Pulwama in 2015, where he has trained over 200 youths in martial arts; several of his students have represented Jammu and Kashmir at the national level and won medals.

As of May 2026, Yaqoob holds a professional record of 5–1 and is ranked 11th among professional men's lightweights in South Asia by Tapology. He has expressed his goal of competing in the Ultimate Fighting Championship.

Owais knocked out Delyan Georgiev in 1st 4 minutes at BRAVE Combat Federation on August 1, 2026.

== Mixed martial arts record ==
Professional record breakdown
7 matches	6 wins	1 loss
By knockout	4	0
By submission	0	1
By decision	2	0

Res.	Record	Opponent	Method	Event	Date	Round	Time	Location	Notes
Win	6–1	Delyan Georgiev	TKO (punches)	Brave CF 107	August 1, 2026	1	4:00	Burgas, Bulgaria	
Win	5–1	Mehmet Can Tasdoven	TKO (knee and punches)	Brave CF 103	December 23, 2025	1	1:24	Bukhara, Uzbekistan	
Win	4–1	Ian Paul Lora	TKO (submission to punches)	Brave CF 98	September 19, 2025	1	1:54	Zhengzhou, China	
Win	3–1	Shetty Pratik Sadashiv	TKO (punches)	Veswa FC 4	April 19, 2025	2	1:45	Panchkula, India	
Win	2–1	Amanzhol Khaisa	Decision (unanimous)	Naiza FC 70	December 21, 2024	3	5:00	Semey, Kazakhstan	
Win	1–1	Mohammad Azim Mokhlis	Decision (unanimous)	Matrix Fight Night 14	March 9, 2024	3	5:00	Noida, India	
Loss	0–1	Neeraj Panghal	Submission (guillotine choke)	Matrix Fight Night 11	March 31, 2023	3	1:24	New Delhi, India	Lightweight debut.
