= 2023 in Brave Combat Federation =

Brave Combat Federation
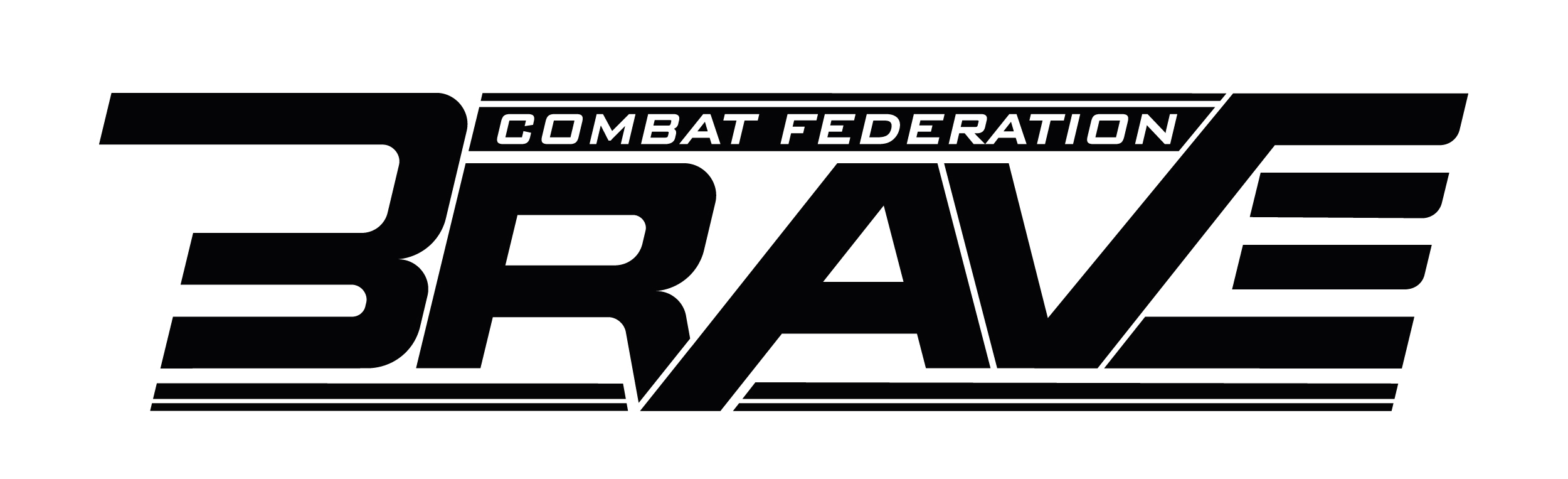

Information
- First date: February 18, 2023
- Last date: December 15, 2023

Events
- Total events: 11

Fights
- Total fights: 87
- Title fights: 6

The year 2023 was the 8th year in the history of the Brave Combat Federation, a mixed martial arts promotion based in Bahrain. For 2023, besides its own channels Brave CF announced official distribution partnerships with DAZN and Fight Network, to broadcast the promotion's Pay-per-view events.

== List of events ==
No.	Event	Date	Venue	Location
1	BRAVE CF 69	February 18, 2023	Stark Arena	Belgrade, Serbia
2	BRAVE CF 70	April 23, 2023	Hala Tivoli	Ljubljana, Slovenia
3	BRAVE CF 71	June 19, 2023	Bahrain National Stadium	Riffa, Bahrain
4	BRAVE CF 72	June 23, 2023	Bahrain National Stadium	Riffa, Bahrain
5	BRAVE CF 73	August 12, 2023	El Coliseo Salitre	Bogotá, Colombia
6	BRAVE CF 74	September 7, 2023	H Arena	Nantes, France
7	BRAVE CF 75	November 18, 2023	Pacho Camurria Arena	Tenerife, Spain
8	BRAVE CF 76	November 25, 2023	Balai Sarbini	Jakarta, Indonesia
9	BRAVE CF 77	December 5, 2023	Khalifa Sports City Stadium	Isa Town, Bahrain
10	BRAVE CF 78: Victorious	December 7, 2023	Centro de Formação Olímpica	Fortaleza, Brazil
11	BRAVE CF 79	December 8, 2023	Khalifa Sports City Stadium	Isa Town, Bahrain
12	BRAVE CF 80	December 15, 2023	Khalifa Sports City Stadium	Isa Town, Bahrain

== BRAVE CF 69 ==
BRAVE CF 69
- Promotion: Brave Combat Federation
- Date: February 18, 2023
- Venue: Stark Arena
- City: Belgrade, Serbia

BRAVE CF 69 was a mixed martial arts event held by Brave Combat Federation on February 18, 2023 at the Stark Arena in Belgrade, Serbia.

=== Background ===
Abdisalam Kubanychbek of Kyrgyzstan, the interim lightweight champion of BRAVE CF, will face Kamil Magomedov of Russia in the main event for the chance to unify the 155-pound global championship. This situation developed after Ahmed Amir, a previous lineal champion, had his title removed because of doubts about his ability to compete again.

Aleksandar "Joker" Ilic, a local celebrity, competes against Marcin Naruszczka of Poland in the third and final fight of the evening in a 90-kilogram catchweight match. When the bout between "Joker" and Brazil's Cleber "Clebinho" Sousa was cancelled, Naruszczka was given the chance to step in and shock the world and achieve the biggest victory of his career - in front of a crowd that hadn't seen their hero fight live since 2018.

=== Results ===
BRAVE CF 69
Weight Class				Method	Round	Time	Note
Lightweight 70 kg	(Kyrgyzstan) Abdisalam Kubanychbek (IC)	def.	(Russia) Kamil Magomedov	Decision (Unanimous)	5	5:00	For the BRAVE CF Lightweight Championship
Heavyweight 120 kg	(Bahrain) Shamil Gaziev	def.	(Serbia) Darko Stošić	TKO (Punches)	1	2:54	
Catchweight 90 kg	(Serbia) Aleksandar Ilić	def.	(Poland) Marcin Naruszczka	Decision (Split)	3	5:00	
Super Lightweight 75 kg	(Croatia) Patrik Čelić	def.	(Serbia) Aleksandar Terzić	KO (Punches)	1	3:57	
Super Lightweight 75 kg	(Belgium) Issa Isakov	def.	(Russia) Ruslan Tedeev	Technical Submission (Rear-Naked Choke)	2	3:55	
Super Lightweight 75 kg	(Egypt) Mahmoud Fawzy	def.	(Greece) Muhammed Kir Ahmet	KO (Punches)	1	0:38	

== BRAVE CF 70 ==
BRAVE CF 70
- Promotion: Brave Combat Federation
- Date: April 23, 2023
- Venue: Hala Tivoli
- City: Ljubljana, Slovenia

BRAVE CF 70 was a mixed martial arts event held by Brave Combat Federation on April 23, 2023 at the Stark Arena in Ljubljana, Slovenia.

=== Background ===
A Heavyweight bout between Erko Jun and Marko Drmonjič was scheduled as the event headliner.

=== Results ===
BRAVE CF 70
Weight Class				Method	Round	Time	Note
Light Heavyweight 93 kg	(Bosnia and Herzegovina) Erko Jun	def.	(Slovenia) Marko Drmonjič	TKO (Punches)	1	2:52	
Super Welterweight 79.5 kg	(Brazil) Joilton Lutterbach	def.	(Sweden) Andreas Gustafsson	Decision (Majority)	3	5:00	
Heavyweight 120 kg	(Lithuania) Pavel Dailidko	def.	(Slovenia) Luka Podkrajšek	KO (Knee)	1	1:23	
Bantamweight 61 kg	(Jordan) Izzeddine Al Derbani	def.	(Colombia) Eduardo Mora	Submission (Guillotine Choke)	2	0:15	
Flyweight 57 kg	(Brazil) Edilceu Alves	def.	(South Africa) Dansheel Moodley	Decision (Unanimous)	3	5:00	
Heavyweight 120 kg	(Slovenia) Miha Frlić	def.	(Ukraine) Danylo Kartavyi	Draw (Unanimous)	3	5:00	
Bantamweight 61 kg	(Ukraine) Vitaliy Yakimenko	def.	(India) Mohammad Farhad	Decision (Unanimous)	3	5:00	
Lightweight 70 kg	(Slovenia) David Forster	def.	(Serbia) Nemanja Nikolić	TKO (Punches)	3	0:41	

== BRAVE CF 71 ==
BRAVE CF 71
- Promotion: Brave Combat Federation
- Date: June 19, 2023
- Venue: National Stadium
- City: Riffa, Bahrain

BRAVE CF 71 was a mixed martial arts event held by Brave Combat Federation on June 19, 2023 at the National Stadium in Riffa, Bahrain.

=== Background ===
A BRAVE CF Super Welterweight Championship bout between current champion Marcin Bandel and the undefeated russian Kamal Magomedov headlined the event. However, Magomedov withdrew from the fight due to an injury, the fight was cancelled and the number one Featherweight contender's bout between Omar Solomanov and Ilyar Askhanov steps in as the new main event.

=== Results ===
BRAVE CF 71
Weight Class				Method	Round	Time	Note
Featherweight 66 kg	(Ukraine) Omar Solomonov	def.	(Kazakhstan) Ilyar Askhanov	Decision (Unanimous)	3	5:00	
Bantamweight 61 kg	(Russia) Velimurad Alkhasov	def.	(Zimbabwe) Nicholas Hwende	Decision (Unanimous)	3	5:00	
Super Lightweight 75 kg	(Pakistan) Abbas Khan	def.	(Palestine) Omar Hussein	Decision (Unanimous)	3	5:00	
Super Lightweight 75 kg	(Egypt) Mahmoud Fawzy	def.	(Tunisia) Oussema Zeidi	Submission (Rear-Naked Choke)	1	1:12	
Preliminary Card
Lightweight 70 kg	(Bahrain) Ramazan Gitinov	def.	(Morocco) Abderrahman Errachidy	Technical Submission (Anaconda Choke)	1	1:55	
Super Lightweight 75 kg	(Turkey) Khamzat Maaev	def.	(Lebanon) Elias Farah	KO (Elbows and Punches)	1	0:41	
Flyweight 57 kg	(Egypt) Maysara Mohamed	def.	(Philippines) Ruel Pañales	KO (Punch)	1	1:25	
Bantamweight 61 kg	(Bahrain) Abdulla Alyaqoob	def.	(Philippines) Kenneth Maningat	TKO (Punches)	2	3:15	

== BRAVE CF 72 ==
BRAVE CF 72
- Promotion: Brave Combat Federation
- Date: June 23, 2023
- Venue: National Stadium
- City: Riffa, Bahrain

BRAVE CF 72 was a mixed martial arts event held by Brave Combat Federation on June 23, 2023 at the National Stadium in Riffa, Bahrain.

=== Background ===
A BRAVE CF Featherweight Championship bout between current champion Roman Bogatov and challenger Nemat Abdrashitov headlined the event.

=== Results ===
BRAVE CF 72
Weight Class				Method	Round	Time	Note
Featherweight 66 kg	(Kyrgyzstan) Nemat Abdrashitov	def.	(Russia) Roman Bogatov (c)	Decision (Unanimous)	5	5:00	For the BRAVE CF Featherweight Championship
Flyweight 57 kg	(Georgia (country)) Bidzina Gavasheshvili	def.	(Bahrain) Magomed Idrisov	Decision (Unanimous)	3	5:00	
Featherweight 66 kg	(France) Yanis Ghemmouri	def.	(Pakistan) Mehmosh Raza	KO (Knee)	2	1:05	
Lightweight 70 kg	(France) Ylies Djiroun	def.	(Kazakhstan) Olzhas Eskaraev	Decision (Unanimous)	3	5:00	
Preliminary Card
Super Welterweight 79.5 kg	(Democratic Republic of the Congo) Eliezer Kubanza	def.	(Algeria) Rayan Atmani	KO (Head Kick)	1	1:10	
Light Heavyweight 93 kg	(Bahrain) Rasul Magomedov	def.	(Egypt) Mohamed Hisham Baraka	TKO (Punches)	1	2:07	
Lightweight 70 kg	(Iran) Mohsen Mohammadseifi	def.	(Egypt) Noor El Islam	KO (Punch)	1	1:37	
Flyweight 57 kg	(Bahrain) Mohamed Alsameea	def.	(Egypt) Ibrahim Hassan	TKO (Punches)	2	4:08	

== BRAVE CF 73 ==
BRAVE CF 73
- Promotion: Brave Combat Federation
- Date: August 12, 2023
- Venue: El Coliseo Salitre
- City: Bogotá, Colombia

BRAVE CF 73: Torres vs. Ndebele will be a mixed martial arts event held by Brave Combat Federation on August 12, 2023 at the El Coliseo Salitre in Bogotá, Colombia.

=== Background ===
A BRAVE CF Bantamweight Championship bout between former two-division Titan FC champion Jose Torres and Nkosi Ndebele headlined the event.

=== Results ===
BRAVE CF 73
Weight Class				Method	Round	Time	Note
Bantamweight 61 kg	(United States) Jose Torres	def.	(South Africa) Nkosi Ndebele	Decision (Split)	5	5:00	For the vacant BRAVE CF Bantamweight Championship
Flyweight 57 kg	(Brazil) Flavio de Queiroz	def.	(United States) Zach Makovsky	TKO (Punches)	1	2:03	
Super Welterweight 79.5 kg	(Brazil) Luiz Cado	def.	(Brazil) Willker Lemos	Submission (Guillotine Choke)	1	2:43	
Bantamweight 61 kg	(Colombia) Eduardo Mora	def.	(Trinidad and Tobago) Keron Bourne	TKO (Punches)	1	1:18	
Preliminary Card
Featherweight 66 kg	(Colombia) Jefferson Gomez	def.	(Colombia) Andres Gómez	Disqualification (Illegal Knees)	1	4:05	
Welterweight 77 kg	(Colombia) Mauricio Otalora	def.	(El Salvador) Carlos Belloso	Decision (Unanimous)	3	5:00	
Flyweight 57 kg	(Peru) Edgar Torres	def.	(Colombia) Carlos Toro	TKO (Punches)	2	1:16	
Lightweight 70 kg	(Ecuador) Diego Morillo	def.	(Colombia) Gabriel Bula	TKO (Head Kick and Punches)	2	3:40	

== BRAVE CF 74 ==
BRAVE CF 74
- Promotion: Brave Combat Federation
- Date: September 7, 2023
- Venue: H Arena
- City: Nantes, France

BRAVE CF 74 was a mixed martial arts event held by Brave Combat Federation on September 7, 2023 at the H Arena in Nantes, France.

=== Background ===
A lightweight bout between Ylies Djiroun and former champion Lucas Martins headlined the event.

=== Results ===
BRAVE CF 74
Weight Class				Method	Round	Time	Note
Lightweight 70 kg	(France) Ylies Djiroun	def.	(Brazil) Lucas Martins	DQ (judgement reversed)	1	3:35	
Lightweight 70 kg	(Ukraine) Vladyslav Rudniev	def.	(France) Anthony Dizy	Decision (unanimous)	3	5:00	
Heavyweight 120 kg	(Lithuania) Pavel Dailidko	def.	(France) Salim El Ouassaidi	TKO (knees and punches)	1	4:11	
Bantamweight 66 kg	(Serbia) Borislav Nikolić	def.	(Azerbaijan) Ali Guliyev	KO (punches)	1	1:34	
Catchweight 81 kg	(France) Levy Carriel	def.	(France) Mathieu Rakotondrazanany	KO (flying switch kick)	1	2:06	
Hexagone MMA 11
Middleweight 84 kg	(France) Laïd Zerhouni	def.	(Brazil) Alessandro Macedo	Submission (rear-naked choke)	1	2:24	For the vacant Hexagone MMA Middleweight Championship.
Featherweight 66 kg	(Algeria) Chabane Chaibeddra	def.	(Argentina) Bruno Conti	Decision (unanimous)	3	5:00	
Featherweight 66 kg	(France) Nacim Belhouachi	def.	(Hungary) Gergely Csibi	Submission (rear-naked choke)	1	3:49	
Lightweight 70 kg	(France) Thomas Glot	def.	(France) Quentin Domergue	Submission (rear-naked choke)	2	3:25	
Heavyweight 120 kg	(France) Tamerlan Albiekov	def.	(Czech Republic) Jindřich Krajča	Submission (north-south choke)	1	3:13	
Heavyweight 120 kg	(France) Anthony Morel	def.	(Senegal) Didier Touré	KO (knee)	2	0:37	
Amateur bouts
Super Lightweight 75 kg	(France) Malik Abdouraguimov	def.	(France) Dylan Hervouin	Decision (unanimous)	3	3:00	
Heavyweight 120 kg	(France) Bafode Gassama	def.	(France) Ferdinand Bretelle	Decision (unanimous)	3	3:00	

== BRAVE CF 75 ==
BRAVE CF 75
- Promotion: Brave Combat Federation
- Date: November 18, 2023
- Venue: Pacho Camurria Arena
- City: Tenerife, Spain

BRAVE CF 75 was a mixed martial arts event held by Brave Combat Federation on November 18, 2023 at the Pacho Camurria Arena in Tenerife, Spain.

=== Background ===
A super lightweight bout between Acoidan Duque and Donovan Desmae headlined the event.

=== Results ===
BRAVE CF 75
Weight Class				Method	Round	Time	Note
Super Lightweight 75 kg	(Spain) Acoidan Duque	def.	(Belgium) Donovan Desmae	TKO (leg injury)	2	5:00	Desmae missed weight (76.4 kg).
Featherweight 66 kg	(Georgia (country)) Levan Kirtadze	def.	(Spain) Kevin Cordero	Decision (unanimous) (29–28, 29–28, 29–28)	3	5:00	
Catchweight 77 kg	(Brazil) Alexander Mikael	def.	(Palestine) Omar Hussein	Decision (split) (29–28, 28–29, 29–28)	3	5:00	
Catchweight 59 kg	(England) Jawany Scott	def.	(Spain) Ubay Gonzalez	Decision (unanimous) (30–27, 30–26, 30–26)	3	5:00	
Lightweight 70 kg	(Morocco) Anuar Bensayiid	def.	(France) Quentin Dumont	TKO (leg kick and punches)	1	3:14	

== BRAVE CF 76 ==
BRAVE CF 76
- Promotion: Brave Combat Federation
- Date: November 25, 2023
- Venue: Balai Sarbini
- City: Jakarta, Indonesia

BRAVE CF 76 was a mixed martial arts event held by Brave Combat Federation on November 25, 2023 at the Balai Sarbini in Jakarta, Indonesia.

=== Background ===
A lightweight bout between Kamil Magomedov and current UAE Warriors Welterweight champion Josh Togo was scheduled as the event headliner.

=== Results ===
BRAVE CF 76
Weight Class				Method	Round	Time	Note
Lightweight 70 kg	(Russia) Kamil Magomedov	def.	(Australia) Josh Togo	Submission (rear-naked choke)	2	1:28	
Super Welterweight 79.5 kg	(Bahrain) Murad Guseinov	def.	(Australia) David Martinez	Technical Submission (buggy choke)	1	3:41	
Lightweight 70 kg	(Indonesia) Windri Patilima	def.	(Philippines) John Manahan	Submission (rear-naked choke)	1	2:45	
Bantamweight 61 kg	(Indonesia) Fajar	def.	(Philippines) Kenneth Maningat	TKO (doctor stoppage)	2	1:08	
Flyweight 57 kg	(Philippines) Ruel Panales	def.	(China) Mao Jianbing	TKO (submission to punches)	1	3:44	
Heavyweight 120 kg	(Mongolia) Ganbayar Tumurkhuyag	def.	(Indonesia) Vincent Majid	KO (punches)	2	1:23	
Preliminary Card
Bantamweight 61 kg	(Iran) Mojtaba Nasiri	def.	(Indonesia) Jefri Arianto	Technical Submission (arm-triangle choke)	1	1:28	
Bantamweight 61 kg	(Indonesia) Randi Febian	def.	(Indonesia) Dwiki Rama Dewantara	TKO (punches)	2	1:38	
Featherweight 66 kg	(Indonesia) Rizal Zulmi	def.	(Thailand) Weerasak Phromsakha	KO (flying knee and punches)	1	0:15	
Bantamweight 61 kg	(Malaysia) Alexander Lew	def.	(Indonesia) Anugrah Simamora	Submission (rear-naked choke)	1	3:40	
Bantamweight 61 kg	(Malaysia) Murugan Silvarajoo	def.	(Indonesia) Ari Fadhillah	Decision (unanimous)	3	5:00	

== BRAVE CF 77 ==
BRAVE CF 77
- Promotion: Brave Combat Federation
- Date: December 5, 2023
- Venue: Khalifa Sports City Stadium
- City: Isa Town, Bahrain

BRAVE CF 77 was a mixed martial arts event held by Brave Combat Federation on December 5, 2023 at the Khalifa Sports City Stadium in Isa Town, Bahrain.

=== Background ===
A BRAVE CF Lightweight Championship bout between reigning champion Abdisalam Kubanychbek and former titleholder Lucas Martins headlined the event. While a BRAVE CF Super Welterweight Championship bout between reigning champion Marcin Bandel and undefeated (10–0) challenger Kamal Magomedov served as the co-main event.

=== Results ===
BRAVE CF 77
Weight Class				Method	Round	Time	Note
Lightweight 70 kg	(Kyrgyzstan) Abdisalam Kubanychbek (c)	def.	(Brazil) Lucas Martins	TKO (punches)	1	3:39	For the BRAVE CF Lightweight Championship
Super Welterweight 79.5 kg	(Russia) Kamal Magomedov	def.	(Poland) Marcin Bandel (c)	TKO (knee and punches)	1	4:01	For the BRAVE CF Super Welterweight Championship
Lightweight 70 kg	(Kazakhstan) Olzhas Eskaraev	def.	(Russia) Ruslan Tedeev	Submission (rear-naked choke)	2	4:28	
Featherweight 66 kg	(Kyrgyzstan) Adilet Nurmatov	def.	(Kazakhstan) Nikolay Samusev	TKO (arm injury)	2	0:06	
Flyweight 57 kg	(Ukraine) Vitaliy Yakimenko	def.	(Egypt) Maysara Mohamed	Submission (rear-naked choke)	1	2:10	
Bantamweight 61 kg	(Zimbabwe) Nicholas Hwende	def.	(Tajikistan) Mutolibsho Akobirov	Decision (unanimous)	3	5:00	
Heavyeight 120 kg	(Slovenia) Haris Aksalič	def.	(Egypt) Eid Amer	TKO (punches)	1	1:27	

== BRAVE CF 78 ==
BRAVE CF 78: Victorious
- Promotion: Brave Combat Federation; Victorious Fighting Entertainment
- Date: December 7, 2023
- Venue: Centro de Formação Olímpica
- City: Fortaleza, Brazil

BRAVE CF 78: Victorious was a mixed martial arts event held by Brave Combat Federation on December 7, 2023 at the Centro de Formação Olímpica in Fortaleza, Brazil.

=== Background ===
An inaugural BRAVE CF Flyweight Championship bout between Velimurad Alkhasov and Edilceu Alves was expected to headline the event. However, due to undisclosed reasons, Alkhasov has pulled out of the title fight and will be replaced by Flavio de Queiroz. Ten days later, it was Flavio's turn to withdraw after the latter fell ill. As a results, a super lightweight bout between Joilton Lutterbach and former BRAVE CF Lightweight champion Luan Santiago was promoted to the main event status. At the weigh-in, Lutterbach missed the weight limit and was removed from the card. In the end, a super welterweight bout between Luiz Cado and Vernon Ramos was decided to lead the main event.

=== Results ===
BRAVE CF 78
Weight Class				Method	Round	Time	Note
Super Welterweight 79.5 kg	(Brazil) Luiz Cado	def.	(Panama) Vernon Ramos	Submission (kneebar)	2	0:43	
Flyweight 57 kg	(Brazil) Marciano Ferreira	def.	(Brazil) Edilceu Alves	TKO (punches)	1	1:56	
Super Lightweight 75 kg	(Brazil) Luan Santiago	def.	(Venezuela) Manuel Mena	Decision (unanimous)	3	5:00	
Lightweight 70 kg	(Brazil) Arlen Ribeiro	vs.	(Guinea-Bissau) Yabna N’Tchalá	Draw (split)	3	5:00	
Catchweight 72.5 kg	(Brazil) Marcelo Marques	def.	(Venezuela) Manuel Mena	Submission (keylock)	1	1:55	
Victorious 5
Lightweight 70 kg	(Brazil) Danillo Santos	def.	(Brazil) Junior Melo	Decision (split)	3	5:00	
Catchweight 68.5 kg	(Brazil) Ricardo de Almeida	def.	(Argentina) Roberto Benítez	TKO (punches)	3	0:32	
Light Heavyweight 93 kg	(Brazil) Jhonathan Azevedo	def.	(Brazil) Raffael Cerqueira	KO (body kick)	1	1:17	
Bantamweight 61 kg	(Brazil) Lazaro Mascarenhas	def.	(Brazil) Tiago Cabloco	Submission (armbar)	1	3:48	
W.Strawweight 52 kg	(Brazil) Ada Leticia	def.	(Brazil) Gracy Maia	Decision (unanimous)	3	5:00	
Featherweight 66 kg	(Angola) Wilker Nsamo	def.	(Brazil) Israel Figueira	Decision (unanimous)	3	5:00	

== BRAVE CF 79 ==
BRAVE CF 79
- Promotion: Brave Combat Federation
- Date: December 8, 2023
- Venue: Khalifa Sports City Stadium
- City: Isa Town, Bahrain

BRAVE CF 79 was a mixed martial arts event held by Brave Combat Federation on December 8, 2023 at the Khalifa Sports City Stadium in Isa Town, Bahrain.

=== Background ===
A middleweight bout between Tahar Hadbi and former BRAVE CF Super Welterweight two-time title challenger Ismail Naurdiev was scheduled as the event headliner.

=== Results ===
BRAVE CF 79
Weight Class				Method	Round	Time	Note
Middleweight 84 kg	(Austria) Ismail Naurdiev	def.	(France) Tahar Hadbi	Submission (guillotine choke)	1	1:10	
Heavyweight 120 kg	(Lithuania) Pavel Dailidko	def.	(Romania) Janos Csukas	TKO (knee injury)	1	0:13	
Super Welterweight 79.5 kg	(Democratic Republic of the Congo) Eliezer Kubanza	def.	(Lebanon) Adel Ibrahim	TKO (punches)	1	3:40	
Super Lightweight 75 kg	(Georgia (country)) Nika Kupravishvili	def.	(Turkey) Khamzat Maaev	TKO (punches)	2	4:34	
Lightweight 70 kg	(Bahrain) Ramazan Gitinov	def.	(Uzbekistan) Ulukbek Ikashev	TKO (leg injury)	1	0:08	
Light Heavyweight 93 kg	(Bahrain) Rasul Magomedov	def.	(Algeria) Mohamed Laid	TKO (punches)	1	3:38	
Lightweight 70 kg	(Iran) Mohsen Mohammadseifi	def.	(Slovenia) David Forster	Decision (unanimous) (30–27, 30–27, 29–28)	3	5:00	
Super Welterweight 79.5 kg	(Netherlands) Chequina Noso Pedro	def.	(United States) Dzhokhar Duraev	Decision (unanimous) (29–28, 29–28, 29–28)	3	5:00	

== BRAVE CF 80 ==
BRAVE CF 80
- Promotion: Brave Combat Federation
- Date: December 15, 2023
- Venue: Khalifa Sports City Stadium
- City: Isa Town, Bahrain

BRAVE CF 80 was a mixed martial arts event held by Brave Combat Federation on December 15, 2023 at the Khalifa Sports City Stadium in Isa Town, Bahrain.

=== Background ===
An immediate BRAVE CF Bantamweight Championship rematch between the newly crowned champion Jose Torres and Nkosi Ndebele served as the event headliner. The pairing first met at BRAVE CF 73 on August 12, 2023, where Torres won the vacant title by split decision.

=== Results ===
BRAVE CF 80
Weight Class				Method	Round	Time	Note
Bantamweight 61 kg	(South Africa) Nkosi Ndebele	def.	(United States) Jose Torres (c)	TKO (retirement)	3	1:38	For the BRAVE CF Bantamweight Championship.
Middleweight 84 kg	(Jordan) Jarrah Al-Silawi	def.	(Serbia) Nenad Avramović	Decision (unanimous)	3	5:00	
Flyweight 57 kg	(Republic of Ireland) Gerard Burns	def.	(Bahrain) Hussain Ayyad Abdulla	KO (punches)	1	1:01	
Super Welterweight 79.5 kg	(England) Jack Grant	def.	(Lebanon) Ahmad Labban	Submission (armbar)	3	4:59	
Bantamweight 61 kg	(England) Dean Garnett	def.	(Jordan) Izzeddine Al Derbani	Decision (unanimous)	3	5:00	
Super Lightweight 75 kg	(England) Chad Griffiths	def.	(Pakistan) Abbas Khan	Submission (guillotine choke)	1	3:03	
Preliminary Card
Women's Bantamweight 61 kg	(Bahrain) Sabrina de Sousa	def.	(India) Monika Kiran Ghag	TKO (punches)	1	0:29	
Flyweight 57 kg	(Bahrain) Mohamed Alsameea	def.	(Egypt) Mohamed Ashraf	TKO (submission to elbows)	1	1:51	
Women's Strawweight 52 kg	(Bahrain) Fabiola Nascimento	def.	(Italy) Jleana Valentino	Decision (unanimous)	3	5:00	

== See also ==
- List of current Brave CF fighters
- List of current mixed martial arts champions
- 2023 in UFC
- 2023 in Bellator MMA
- 2023 in ONE Championship
- 2023 in Absolute Championship Akhmat
- 2023 in Konfrontacja Sztuk Walki
- 2023 in Rizin Fighting Federation
- 2023 in LUX Fight League
- 2023 in Road FC
