= List of current Brave CF fighters =

BRAVE Combat Federation, also known as BRAVE CF, is a mixed martial arts (MMA) promotion based out of Bahrain. It was established on 23 September 2016 by Sheikh Khalid bin Hamad Al Khalifa and is currently one among the fastest-rising MMA properties in the world.

This list is an up-to-date roster of those fighters currently under contract with the BRAVE CF brand. Fighters are organized by weight class and within their weight class by their number of fights with the promotion. Each fight record has four categories: wins, losses, draws, and no-contests. All fight records in this article are displayed in that order, with fights resulting in a no-contest listed in parentheses.

BRAVE Combat Federation adopted a new weight class for 2019: Super Lightweight (165 lbs), and also increased the weight limit of the Welterweight class to 175 lbs.

== Fighters ==
=== Heavyweight (265 Ib, 120 kg) ===
ISO	Name	Nickname	MMA record	BRAVE record	Year of Last BRAVE fight
Lithuania	Pavel Dailidko (C)	The Experiment	12–2	8–1	2026
(Poland)	Patryk Dubiela	Bizon	6–4	1–2	2025
(Ukraine)	Danylo Voievodkin	Ironfist	7–1	0–1	2026

=== Light Heavyweight (205 Ib, 93 kg) ===
ISO	Name	Nickname	MMA record	BRAVE record	Year of Last BRAVE fight
(Algeria)	Mohamed Said Maalem(C)	L'Ambiance	15–6–1 (1)	4–3–1 (1)	2026
(Bosnia and Herzegovina)	Erko Jun	The Bounty Hunter	9–4	3–2	2026

=== Middleweight (185 Ib, 83.9 kg) ===
ISO	Name	Nickname	MMA record	BRAVE record	Year of Last BRAVE fight

=== Welterweight (170 Ib, 77.1 kg) ===
ISO	Name	Nickname	MMA record	BRAVE record	Year of Last BRAVE fight
Bahrain	Murad Guseinov		10–0	4–0	2025
Bahrain	Zagid Gaidarov		7–2	3–1	2025
(Bosnia and Herzegovina)	Amil Tutić		3–1	2–1	2026
(Slovenia)	Jan Berus		7–2	1–2	2026
(Bulgaria)	Deyan Galinov		5–1	2–0	2026

=== Lightweight (155 Ib, 70.3 kg) ===
ISO	Name	Nickname	MMA record	BRAVE record	Year of Last BRAVE fight
(Bahrain)	Ramazan Gitinov		7–0	5–0	2026
Slovenia	Domen Drnovsek		4–2 (1)	4–1 (1)	2026
(Belgium)	Youssef Boughanem		5–0	4–0	2025
(Turkey)	Khamzat Maaev	Borz	6–1	3–1	2025
(Bulgaria)	Anton Yanchev		5–0	3–0	2026
(India)	Owais Yaqoob		6–1	3–0	2026
(Bulgaria)	Pavel Vladev	The Werewolf	10–1	2–0	2026
(Kyrgyzstan)	Nizambek Abdrashitov		12–3	2–0	2026
(Bahrain)	Kurban Idrisov		9–0	2–0	2026
(Russia)	Artur Arutyunyan		11–5	0–2	2026

=== Featherweight (145 Ib, 65.7 kg) ===
ISO	Name	Nickname	MMA record	BRAVE record	Year of Last BRAVE fight
Zimbabwe	Nicholas Hwende (C)		11–2	5–2	2026
Ukraine	Omar Solomonov		14–4	5–2	2026
Kazakhstan	Rauan Bekbolat	Shymyr	12–4–2	3–1	2026

=== Bantamweight (135 Ib, 61.2 kg) ===
ISO	Name	Nickname	MMA record	BRAVE record	Year of Last BRAVE fight
(Philippines)	Stephen Loman	The Sniper	17–4	6–1	2026
(Georgia (country))	Lasha Abramishvili		13–2–1	5–0	2026
(Pakistan)	Ismail Khan	Volcano	12–1	4–0	2025
France	Brice Picaud	Lion Kid	17–11 (1)	1–3	2026
(Tajikistan)	Khurshed Nazarov	Good Boy	10–2–1	1–2	2025
(Pakistan)	Awan Aqib		7–3–1	1–1–1	2025

=== Women's Flyweight (125 Ib, 56.7 kg) ===
ISO	Name	Nickname	MMA record	BRAVE record	Year of Last BRAVE fight
Slovenia	Maja Drnovšek		3–0	3–0	2026

=== Flyweight (125 Ib, 56.7 kg) ===
ISO	Name	Nickname	MMA record	BRAVE record	Year of Last BRAVE fight
Bahrain	Mohamed Alsameea		6–1	6–1	2026
Bahrain	Magomed Idrisov		12–2	4–2	2026
(Georgia (country))	Bidzina Gavashelishvili		15–5	4–2	2026
(Republic of Ireland)	Gerard Burns	The Animal	7–2	4–1	2025
(Kazakhstan)	Dias Yerengaipov	Son of the Steppes	19–3	4–0	2026
(South Africa)	Luthando Biko	Shorty	13–6	1–2	2026

=== Women's Strawweight (115 Ib, 52.2 kg) ===
ISO	Name	Nickname	MMA record	BRAVE record	Year of Last BRAVE fight
England	Mim Grubb		3–0	2–0	2025
India	Aarti Khatri	Destroyer	7–1	1–0	2025

== Partnership with IMMAF ==
Since 2017, IMMAF has partnered with Brave Combat Federation to host world championships outside the USA. As a result, Bahrain became the second nation to host IMMAF World Championships in 2017, 2018, and 2019. The promotion absorbs athletes transitioning from amateur to professional MMA, including major names such as Jose Torres, Frans Mlambo, Mohammed Mokaev, Eliezer Kubanza, Nkosi Ndebele, and many more.

== See also ==
- 2023 in Brave Combat Federation
- List of current UFC fighters
- List of current ACA fighters
- List of current Invicta FC fighters
- List of current KSW fighters
- List of current Oktagon MMA fighters
- List of current ONE fighters
- List of current PFL fighters
- List of current Rizin FF fighters
- List of current Road FC fighters
