= 2020 in Brave Combat Federation =

Brave Combat Federation
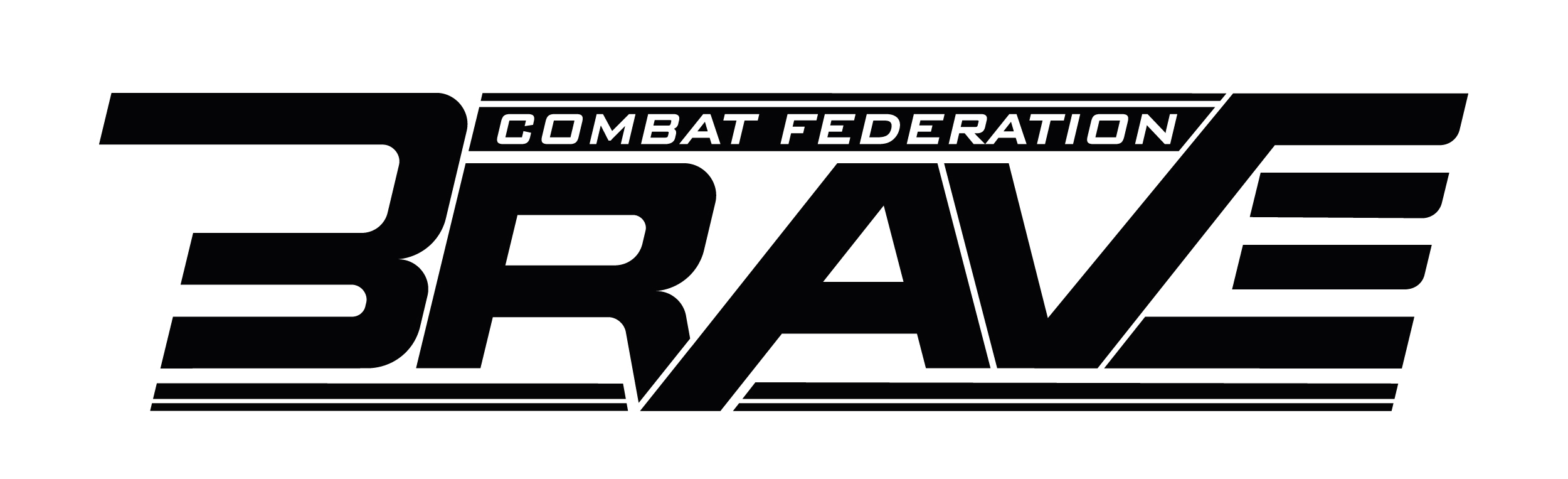

Information
- First date: January 19, 2020

The year 2020 was the 5th year in the history of the Brave Combat Federation, a mixed martial arts promotion based in Bahrain.

== 2020-2021 BRAVE CF Flyweight Tournament ==
=== BRAVE CF Flyweight Tournament bracket ===
Quarter-finals
(Brazil) Flavio de Queiroz	3r.
(Russia) Velimurad Alkhasov	UD
(Finland) Abdul Hussein	-
(United States) Zach Makovsky	Bye^{1}
(Russia) Ali Bagautinov	UD
(United States) Dustin Ortiz	3r.
(United States) Jose Torres	UD
(Republic of Ireland) Blaine O’Driscoll^{2}	3r.

Semi-finals
(Russia) Velimurad Alkhasov	SD
(United States) Zach Makovsky	3r.
(Russia) Ali Bagautinov
(United States) Jose Torres

Final
(Russia) Velimurad Alkhasov
TBD

^{1}Zach Makovsky got a Quarterfinal bye as Abdul Hussein pulled out due to illness during the weightcut.

^{2}First bout between Torres and Sean Santella ended in a draw at Brave CF 42; Santella was replaced for the rematch by Blaine O’Driscoll due to injury and the bout was held at the Catchweight of 61 kgs

Legend
(SD)	(Split Decision)
(UD)	(Unanimous Decision)
(MD)	(Majority Decision)
SUB	Submission
(T)KO	(Technical) Knock Out
L	Loss
#	Round

== Brave CF 34: Slovenia ==
Brave CF 34: Slovenia
- Promotion: Brave Combat Federation; World Freefight Challenge
- Date: January 19, 2020
- Venue: Hala Tivoli
- City: Ljubljana, Slovenia

Brave CF 34: Slovenia (also known as WFC 24: Caged) was a mixed martial arts event held by Brave Combat Federation in partnership with World Freefight Challenge on January 19, 2020 at the Hala Tivoli in Ljubljana, Slovenia.

=== Results ===
BRAVE CF 34
Weight Class				Method	Round	Time	Notes
Heavyweight 120 kg	(Slovenia) Luka Podkrajšek	def.	(Bosnia and Herzegovina) Viktor Vasić	Decision (Split)	3	5:00	For vacant WFC Heavyweight Championship
Welterweight 79 kg	(France) Benoît Saint-Denis	def.	(Croatia) Ivica Trušček	Submission (Kneebar)	1	0:00	
Light Heavyweight 93 kg	(Slovenia) Jakob Nedoh	def.	(Serbia) Zarko Sedoglavic	KO (Punches)	1	0:00	
Middleweight 84 kg	(United States) Phil Hawes	def.	(Brazil) Yuri Fraga	TKO (Punches)	1	0:00	
Flyweight 57 kg	(United States) Zach Makovsky	def.	(Russia) Velimurad Alkhasov	Decision (Split)	3	5:00	
Preliminary Card
Lightweight 70 kg	(Austria) Mochamed Machaev	def.	(Slovenia) Matjaž Vičar	Decision (Unanimous)	3	5:00	
Women's Catchweight 53 kg	(Slovenia) Monika Kucinic	def.	(France) Jennifer Trioreau	Decision (Unanimous)	3	5:00	
Welterweight 79 kg	(Slovenia) Bojan Kosednar	def.	(Croatia) Tonči Peruško	TKO (Punches)	1	0:00	
Catchweight 88 kg	(Slovenia) Marko Drmonjič	def.	(Slovenia) Matej Plavec	TKO (Leg Kicks)	2	0:00	

== Brave CF 35 ==
BRAVE CF 35
- Promotion: Brave Combat Federation; RXF
- Date: July 20, 2020
- Venue: Berăria H
- City: Bucharest, Romania

BRAVE CF 35 was a mixed martial arts event held by Brave Combat Federation in partnership with Real Xtreme Fighting that took place on July 20, 2020 at the Berăria H in Bucharest, Romania.

=== Results ===
BRAVE CF 35
Weight Class				Method	Round	Time	Notes
Catchweight 88 kg	(Italy) Enrico Cortese	def.	(Romania) Claudiu Alexe	Submission (Strikes)	1	2:00	
Heavyweight 120 kg	(Romania) Ion Grigore	def.	(Senegal) Mamadou Lamine Sène	TKO (Punches)	2	4:30	
Women's Flyweight 57 kg	(Sweden) Malin Hermansson	def.	(Romania) Ana Maria Pal	Submission (Rear-Naked Choke)	2	2:30	
Lightweight 70 kg	(France) Aboubakar Tounkara	def.	(Romania) Marvin Belecciu	TKO (Punches and Elbows)	2	3:36	
Bantamweight 61 kg	(Romania) Mihai Laurențiu Iorga	def.	(Romania) Ioan Vrânceanu	KO (Head Kick)	2	3:34	
Welterweight 79 kg	(Romania) Mirel Drăgan	def.	(Romania) Marian Olaru	Submission (Guillotine Choke)	1	2:39	

== Brave CF 36 ==
Brave CF 36
- Promotion: Brave Combat Federation; RXF
- Date: July 27, 2020
- Venue: Berăria H
- City: Bucharest, Romania

BRAVE CF 36 was a mixed martial arts event scheduled held by Brave Combat Federation in partnership with Real Xtreme Fighting that took place on July 27, 2020 at the Berăria H in Bucharest, Romania.

=== Results ===
BRAVE CF 36
Weight Class				Method	Round	Time	Notes
Catchweight 106 kg	(Trinidad and Tobago) Todd Stoute	def.	(Romania) Cristian Constantinov	Submission (Strikes)	1	2:12	
Welterweight 79 kg	(Switzerland) Kevin Ruart	def.	(Romania) Ion Surdu	KO (Punches)	1	3:14	
Catchweight 72 kg	(Poland) Maciej Gierszewski	def.	(Romania) Bogdan Suru	TKO (Punches)	1	1:08	
Featherweight 66 kg	(Austria) Mochamed Machaev	def.	(Romania) Ciprian Mariș	TKO (Doctor Stoppage)	2	5:00	
Bantamweight 61 kg	(Latvia) Matiss Zaharovs	def.	(Sweden) Bilal Tipsaev	TKO (Punches)	3	2:16	

== Brave CF 37 ==
Brave CF 37
- Promotion: Brave Combat Federation
- Date: August 1, 2020
- City: Stockholm, Sweden

Brave CF 37 was a mixed martial arts event scheduled to be held by Brave Combat Federation in co-promotion with Bulldog Fight Night on August 1, 2020, in Stockholm, Sweden.

=== Results ===
BRAVE CF 37
Weight Class				Method	Round	Time	Notes
Welterweight 79 kg	(Denmark) Louis Glismann	def.	(Finland) Henri Lintula	Submission (Rear-Naked Choke)	2	1:30	
Heavyweight 120 kg	(Sweden) Irman Smajić	def.	(Turkey) Fatih Aktas	Decision (Unanimous)	3	5:00	
Bantamweight 61 kg	(United Kingdom) Muhammad Mokaev	def.	(Northern Ireland) Glenn McVeigh	Decision (Unanimous)	3	5:00	
Light Heavyweight 93 kg	(Sweden) Anton Turkalj	def.	(Greece) Athanasios Herkeletzis	TKO (Punches and Elbows)	1	1:15	
Featherweight 66 kg	(Sweden) Fernando Flores	def.	(Brazil) Michael Deiga-Scheck	Submission (Brabo Choke)	1	4:51	
W.Strawweight 52 kg	(Sweden) Bianca Antman	def.	(Finland) Veera Nykanen	KO (Head Kick)	3	1:37	
Lightweight 70 kg	(Sweden) Hamid Sadid	def.	(Iran) Seyedmasud Darake	TKO (Punches)	1	1:37	
Welterweight 79 kg	(Norway) Mohamed Zarey	def.	(France) Ahouzi Kouamé	Submission (Heel-Hook)	1	2:12	
Preliminary Card
W.Catchweight 54 kg	(Sweden) Josefine Lindgren Knutsson	def.	(Sweden) Nina Back	Decision (Unanimous)	3	3:00	Amateur bout
Welterweight 79 kg	(Sweden) Abdallah Habib	def.	(Sweden) Mamadaliyev Mashrab	Decision (Unanimous)	3	3:00	Amateur bout
Welterweight 79 kg	(Sweden) Erik Wahrolen	def.	(Sweden) Ehsan Sheikh	Submission (Rear-Naked Choke)	3	1:11	Amateur bout
Lightweight 70 kg	(Sweden) Martin Corney	def.	(Sweden) Dimitris Dimitriadis	Submission (Rear-Naked Choke)	3	2:40	Amateur bout
Welterweight 79 kg	(Sweden) Mattias Henriksson	def.	(Sweden) Lucas Wallhager	TKO	1	2:05	Amateur bout
Featherweight 66 kg	(Sweden) Baysangur Makaev	def.	(Sweden) Jakob Valegren	Decision (Unanimous)	3	3:00	Amateur bout

== Brave CF 38 ==
BRAVE CF 38
- Promotion: Brave Combat Federation
- Date: August 8, 2020
- City: Stockholm, Sweden

Brave CF 38 was a mixed martial arts event scheduled to be held by Brave Combat Federation in co-promotion with Bulldog Fight Night on August 8, 2020, in Stockholm, Sweden.

=== Results ===
BRAVE CF 38
Weight Class				Method	Round	Time	Notes
Middleweight 84 kg	(France) Abdoul Abdouraguimov	def.	(England) Carl Booth	Submission (Brabo Choke)	1	4:20	
Middleweight 84 kg	(France) Benoît Saint-Denis	def.	(England) Mario Saeed	TKO (Punches)	2	1:49	
Bantamweight 61 kg	(Albania) Bernardo Sopai	def.	(Canada) Tariq Ismail	Decision (Unanimous)	3	5:00	
Super Lightweight 75 kg	(Belgium) Issa Isakov	def.	(Netherlands) Djamil Chan	Decision (Unanimous)	3	5:00	
W.Flyweight 57 kg	(Sweden) Elin Öberg	def.	(Sweden) Malin Hermansson	Decision (Split)	3	5:00	
Catchweight 74 kg	(Sweden) David Jacobsson	def.	(Sweden) Dilmurod Movlonov	Decision (Split)	3	5:00	
Catchweight 72 kg	(Sweden) Robert Nystrom	def.	(Sweden) Joakim Jankovic	Technical Submission (Guillotine Choke)	1	4:46	
Bantamweight 61 kg	(Sweden) Jonny Touma	def.	(Sweden) Moheb Azizi	Decision (Unanimous)	3	5:00	
Catchweight 68 kg	(England) PK Zadeh	def.	(Sweden) Wasi Id	Decision (Unanimous)	3	5:00	
W.Flyweight 57 kg	(Sweden) Jonna Timesgard	def.	(Sweden) Alline Torquato	Decision (Unanimous)	3	3:00	Amateur bout.
Middleweight 84 kg	(Latvia) Rahmads Stromanis	def.	(Sweden) Ola Jacobsson	Decision (Unanimous)	3	3:00	Amateur bout.

== Brave CF 39 ==
BRAVE CF 39
- Promotion: Brave Combat Federation
- Date: August 15, 2020
- City: Stockholm, Sweden

Brave CF 39 was a mixed martial arts event scheduled to be held by Brave Combat Federation in co-promotion with Bulldog Fight Night on August 15, 2020, in Stockholm, Sweden.

=== Results ===
BRAVE CF 39
Weight Class				Method	Round	Time	Notes
Welterweight 79 kg	(Greece) Giannis Bachar	def.	(Algeria) Tahar Hadbi	Decision (Unanimous)	3	5:00	
Middleweight 84 kg	(Sweden) Andreas Berg Gustafsson	def.	(Serbia) Miro Jurković	TKO (Punches)	3	4:10	
Bantamweight 61 kg	(Sweden) Tobias Harila	def.	(Brazil) Rafael Macedo	TKO (Retirement)	2	5:00	
Catchweight 64 kg	(Brazil) Felipe Lima	def.	(Iran) Farbod Irannejad	Decision (Unanimous)	3	5:00	
Bantamweight 61 kg	(Sweden) Sameer Siraj	def.	(Italy) Gregorio Davide La Torre	Decision (Unanimous)	3	5:00	
Preliminary Card
Heavyweight 120 kg	(Sweden) Zvonimir Kralj	def.	(Sweden) Samir Sadoun	TKO (Kick and Punches)	1	0:29	
Middleweight 84 kg	(Sweden) Alexander Lindgren	def.	(Sweden) Eddie Olsson	Submission (D'Arce Choke)	2	0:46	Amateur bout.
W.Featherweight 66 kg	(Sweden) Nikolija Milosevic	def.	(Sweden) Jessica Andersson	Decision (Unanimous)	3	3:00	Amateur bout.

== Brave CF 40 ==
BRAVE CF 40
- Promotion: Brave Combat Federation
- Date: August 24, 2020
- City: Stockholm, Sweden

Brave CF 40 was a mixed martial arts event scheduled to be held by Brave Combat Federation in co-promotion with Bulldog Fight Night on August 24, 2020, in Stockholm, Sweden.

=== Results ===
BRAVE CF 40
Weight Class				Method	Round	Time	Notes
Featherweight 66 kg	(Austria) Mochamed Machaev	def.	(England) Shoaib Yousaf	Decision (Unanimous)	3	5:00	
Light Heavyweight 93 kg	(Sweden) Anton Turkalj	def.	(Austria) Ibo Aslan	Submission (Rear-Naked Choke)	2	1:57	
Welterweight 79 kg	(Sweden) David Jacobsson	def.	(Romania) Corneliu Rotaru Lascar	TKO (Kick and Punches)	1	0:48	
Catchweight 72 kg	(Switzerland) Husein Kadimagomaev	def.	(Germany) Sven Fortenbacher	TKO (Punches)	2	1:37	
Heavyweight 120 kg	(Sweden) Zvonimir Kralj	def.	(Turkey) Fatih Aktas	TKO (Kick and Punches)	2	1:14	
Preliminary Card
Catchweight 63.5 kg	(Uruguay) Mateo Rodriguez	def.	(Sweden) Samir Basheer	Decision (Unanimous)	3	3:00	Amateur bout.

== Brave CF 41 ==
BRAVE CF 41
- Promotion: Brave Combat Federation
- Date: September 17, 2020
- City: Riffa, Bahrain

Brave CF 41 was a mixed martial arts event scheduled to be held by Brave Combat Federation on September 17, 2020, in Riffa, Bahrain.

=== Results ===
BRAVE CF 41
Weight Class				Method	Round	Time	Notes
Middleweight 84 kg	(Lebanon) Mohammad Fakhreddine	def.	(Brazil) Daniel Pereira (c)	TKO (Punches)	4	1:08	For BRAVE Combat Federation Middleweight Championship
Middleweight 84 kg	(Russia) Ikram Aliskerov	def.	(Russia) Denis Tiuliulin	Submission (Kimura)	3	1:48	
Super Lightweight 75 kg	(Egypt) Ahmed Amir	def.	(Republic of Ireland) Cian Cowley	Decision (Unanimous)	3	5:00	
Lightweight 70 kg	(United Kingdom) Sam Patterson	def.	(Brazil) Felipe Silva	KO (Punch)	1	2:12	
Flyweight 57 kg	(Russia) Magomed Idrisov	def.	(Philippines) John Cris Corton	Decision (Unanimous)	3	5:00	
Bantamweight 61 kg	(Afghanistan) Rahmatullah Yousufzai	def.	(Russia) Abdulmanap Magomedov	KO (Punches)	1	0:42	
Bantamweight 61 kg	(Bahrain) Abdulla Alyaqoob	def.	(Russia) Umed Urfonov	Decision (Unanimous)	3	3:00	Amateur bout.

== Brave CF 42 ==
BRAVE CF 42
- Promotion: Brave Combat Federation
- Date: September 24, 2020
- City: Riffa, Bahrain

Brave CF 42 was a mixed martial arts event scheduled to be held by Brave Combat Federation on September 24, 2020, in Riffa, Bahrain.

=== Results ===
BRAVE CF 42
Weight Class				Method	Round	Time	Notes
Flyweight 57 kg	(United States) Jose Torres	vs.	(United States) Sean Santella	Draw (Majority)	3	5:00	Flyweight Tournament Quarter-Final
Flyweight 57 kg	(Russia) Velimurad Alkhasov	def.	(Brazil) Flavio de Queiroz	Decision (Unanimous)	3	5:00	Flyweight Tournament Quarter-Final
Bantamweight 61 kg	(Bahrain) Hamza Kooheji	def.	(Wales) Aidan James	Decision (Split)	3	5:00	
Middleweight 84 kg	(The Gambia) Ibrahim Mané	def.	(Sweden) David Jacobsson	Decision (Unanimous)	3	5:00	
Lightweight 70 kg	(Philippines) Rolando Dy	def.	(Poland) Maciek Gierszewski	Decision (Split)	3	5:00	
Feathereight 66 kg	(Bahrain) Ali Yaqoob	def.	(India) Ariz Ahmed	Decision (Unanimous)	3	3:00	Amateur bout.

== Brave CF 43 ==
BRAVE CF 43
- Promotion: Brave Combat Federation
- Date: October 01, 2020
- City: Riffa, Bahrain

Brave CF 43 was a mixed martial arts event scheduled to be held by Brave Combat Federation on October 01, 2020, in Riffa, Bahrain.

=== Results ===
BRAVE CF 43
Weight Class				Method	Round	Time	Notes
Middleweight 84 kg	(Jordan) Jarrah Hussein Al-Silawi	def.	(Netherlands) Melvin van Suijdam	Decision (Unanimous)	3	5:00	
Bantamweight 61 kg	(Russia) Kasum Kasumov	def.	(Bulgaria) Dimitar Kostov	Submission (Arm-Triangle Choke)	1	2:31	
Lightweight 70 kg	(Russia) Akhmed Shervaniev	def.	(Sweden) Arman Popal	TKO (Punches)	2	2:45	
Bantamweight 61 kg	(United Kingdom) Muhammad Mokaev	def.	(England) Jamie Kelly	Submission (Rear-Naked Choke)	3	2:11	
Feathereight 66 kg	(Russia) Anzor Abdulkhozhaev	def.	(Iran) Soheil Davoodi	Decision (Unanimous)	3	5:00	
Catchweight 67 kg	(South Korea) Tae Kyun Kim	def.	(Mexico) Arturo Chavez	TKO (Corner Stoppage)	2	5:00	
Feathereight 66 kg	(Pakistan) Mehmosh Raza	def.	(Scotland) Calum Murrie	Decision (Split)	3	5:00	

== Brave CF 44 ==
BRAVE CF 44
- Promotion: Brave Combat Federation
- Date: November 05, 2020
- City: Riffa, Bahrain

Brave CF 44 was a mixed martial arts event scheduled to be held by Brave Combat Federation on November 05, 2020, in Riffa, Bahrain.

=== Results ===
BRAVE CF 44
Weight Class				Method	Round	Time	Notes
Lightweight 70 kg	(France) Amin Ayoub	def.	(Brazil) Cleiton Silva (c)	KO (Punches)	4	1:23	For BRAVE CF Lightweight Championship
Welterweight 79 kg	(France) Abdoul Abdouraguimov	def.	(Denmark) Louis Glismann	Submission (Arm-Triangle Choke)	1	2:50	
Lightweight 70 kg	(Philippines) Rolando Dy	def.	(New Zealand) John Brewin	Decision (Unanimous)	3	5:00	
Middleweight 84 kg	(South Africa) Mzwandile Hlongwa	def.	(Austria) Dominic Schober	TKO (Doctor Stoppage)	2	5:00	
Bantamweight 61 kg	(Russia) Bair Shtepin	def.	(Brazil) Gerson Pereira	KO (Spinning Back Kick)	1	5:00	
Lightweight 70 kg	(Luxembourg) Yann Liasse	def.	(Pakistan) Abbas Khan	TKO (Flying Knee and Punches)	1	3:07	
Catchweight 73 kg	(Bahrain) Mohamed Sameer	def.	(Lebanon) Toni Abi Rached	Decision (Split)	3	3:00	Amateur bout
Flyweight 57 kg	(Bahrain) Mohammed Salah AlMuamari	def.	(Palestine) Mohammad Tawfiq Almharat	Decision (Unanimous)	3	3:00	Amateur bout

== Brave CF 45 ==
BRAVE CF 45
- Promotion: Brave Combat Federation
- Date: November 19, 2020
- City: Riffa, Bahrain

Brave CF 45 was a mixed martial arts event scheduled to be held by Brave Combat Federation on November 19, 2020, in Riffa, Bahrain.

=== Results ===
BRAVE CF 45
Weight Class				Method	Round	Time	Notes
Super Lightweight 75 kg	(Colombia) Dumar Roa	def.	(United Kingdom) Ian Entwistle	TKO (Injury)	1	2:47	
Catchweight 97 kg	(Algeria) Mohamed Said Maalem	def.	(Sweden) Zvonimir Kralj	TKO (Punches)	1	3:50	
Catchweight 80 kg	(Kyrgyzstan) Abdysalam Uulu Kubanychiev	def.	(Azerbaijan) Vagif Askerov	TKO (Punches)	1	3:33	
Catchweight 72 kg	(South Africa) Nkosi Ndebele	def.	(Pakistan) Zia Mashwani	TKO (Punches)	1	4:29	
Catchweight 97 kg	(Bahrain) Murtaza Talha Ali	def.	(Belarus) Vadim Litvin	Submission (Rear-Naked Choke)	2	3:00	
Welterweight 79 kg	(Russia) Akhmed Magomedov	def.	(Afghanistan) Abdul Azim Badakhshi	Decision (Unanimous)	3	5:00	
Welterweight 79 kg	(Lebanon) Adon Ayoub	def.	(Bahrain) Isa Alameeri	Submission (Armbar)	2	2:34	Amateur bout
Flyweight 57 kg	(Bahrain) Mohammed Zuhair	def.	(Bahrain) Ali Abuhamda	Decision (Unanimous)	3	3:00	Amateur bout

== See also ==
- List of current Brave CF fighters
- List of current mixed martial arts champions
