= Haruo Ochi =

Japanese mixed martial artist

- Born: 7 February 1984 (age 42); Saijō, Ehime, Japan
- Native name: 越智晴雄
- Nationality: Japanese
- Height: 5 ft 3 in (1.60 m)
- Weight: 115 lb (52 kg; 8 st 3 lb)
- Division: Flyweight (2008–2015, 2021–2023); Strawweight (2015–2026)
- Style: Boxing, Karate
- Stance: Orthodox
- Fighting out of: Saijō, Ehime, Japan
- Team: Paraestra Ehime (2008–2024); Little Giant Gym (2024-present)
- Years active: 2008–present

Mixed martial arts record
- Total: 42
- Wins: 27
- By knockout: 8
- By submission: 9
- By decision: 10
- Losses: 12
- By submission: 1
- By decision: 11
- Draws: 2
- No contests: 1

Other information
- Mixed martial arts record from Sherdog

Haruo Ochi (Japanese: 越智晴雄, born 7 February 1984) is a retired Japanese mixed martial artist, who has professionally competed from 2008 to 2026. He is a former two-time DEEP Strawweight Champion. According to Fight Matrix he is the #4 strawweight in the world as of October 2020, and is considered to be one of the best current strawweights.

== Mixed martial arts career ==
=== Shooto ===
Ochi began his professional career as a flyweight in Shooto. His first fight came in early 2008, during Shooto: Shooting Disco 4: Born in the Fighting, when he fought the 0-1-2 Masumi Tozawa. Ochi would begin the fight with a left hook knockdown of his opponent, helped by Tozawa being off-balanced. Tozawa would, however, prove to be a better striker in the match-up, landing several well placed kicks and knees. Late in the second minute of the fight, Ochi shot for a takedown, lifted his opponent, and slammed Tozawa, earning a slam knockout victory in his debut, after just three minutes.

Ochi fought again during Shooto: Shooto Tradition 2, with his opponent being the streaking Yuta Nezu. Ochi would implement a pressuring game, and landed a left hook in the third round which staggered Nezu. After following up with a second punch, Nezu's corner threw in the towel. This fight would be followed by Ochi's first professional loss, a unanimous decision against Kosuke Eda.

Looking to bounce back from a loss, Ochi participated in the 2009 Shooto Flyweight Tournament. In the first round he would face the DEEP veteran Seiji Akao, who was likewise coming of from a loss. Ochi would once again pressure his opponent and win by a first-round TKO. A month later Ochi fought Tsuyoshi Okada, winning the fight by an armbar. In the tournament finals, Ochi fought the undefeated Keita Yoshida. After an evenly matched fight, the bout was ruled a majority draw. The judges saw Yoshida as having done more and declared him the tournament winner.

Ochi fought twice in 2010. In his first fight of the year he faced Kono Keita. He suffered his second professional loss, again losing by a unanimous decision. Subsequently, he fought Hiroaki Ijima during Shooto: The Way of Shooto 6: Like a Tiger, Like a Dragon. Ochi won a clear decision, with all three judges awarding him the win.

Ochi fought five more times under the Shooto banner, losing once and winning four times. The most notable fight during this 4–1 run was against Kiyotaka Shimizu. Shimizu was at the time the reigning Pancrase Super Flyweight champion, while Ochi came into the fight riding a four fight winning streak and being the #6 ranked flyweight in Shooto. Ochi won the fight by a majority decision, with two judges scoring the fight in his favor, as Ochi successfully defended Shimizu's takedowns and dominated the striking exchanges.

=== DEEP ===
Haruo Ochi's first bout with DEEP was in the co-main slot of the Tokyo Impact event, when he faced Chikara Shimabukuro. The fight was considered a number one contender's bout, with the winner expected to fight Tatsumitsu Wada, who was at the time the DEEP flyweight champion. Ochi secured a first round finish, winning by a guillotine choke.

In his next fight Ochi challenged Tatsumitu Wada for the DEEP Flyweight title during DEEP 64. Wada managed to win a comfortable decision, with all three judges awarding him the victory.

Ochi fought Masakazu Imanari during DEEP 67. During the first round of their matchup Imanari attempted several takedowns, with Ochi managing to defend them and dominate the striking exchanges. Late into the first round, Ochi dropped Imanari with a strike, followed up with ground and pound, and Imanari unsuccessfully attempted a triangle from the bottom. In the second round, Imanari rolled for a heel hook, but Ochi kicked out of it. The referee called for a stop in the action, and the ringside doctor ended the fight, as he suspected that Imanari suffered an orbital fracture.

During DEEP's New Year's Eve event, Dream Impact 2014: Omisoka Special, Ochi fought the former DEEP Bantamweight and Pancrase Featherweight champion Yoshiro Maeda. The majority of the fight was spent in grappling exchanges, with both fighters attempting takedowns, submissions and clinch fighting. Maeda won a majority decision.

Ochi then fought Kota Ishibashi. Ochi relied entirely on out-wrestling Ishibashi, who managed to land several good strikes in between conceding takedowns. The judges ruled the fight a unanimous draw, as Ochi failed to land effective damage on Kota.

In his last career fight at flyweight at that point, Ochi fought Sota Kojima at DEEP Cage Impact 2015 on July 20, 2015. Ochi won the first round through a mixture of body strikes and jab counters. The second round was won by Kojima, who kept distance from Ochi with straight punches and mixing in takedowns, while the third round featured mostly grappling exchanges with Kojima ending the round in back mount. Kojima won a split decision, with two of the three judges scoring 29–28 in his favor.

Following this 0–2–1 run, Ochi would move down to strawweight. His first fight at the weight was against the 0-3 Joo Ho Son, which Ochi won through a second-round TKO.

In April 2016 it was announced that Ochi would be participating in DEEP's 4-man strawweight tournament that would crown the new strawweight champion. In the semifinal bout he faced Kanta Sato at DEEP 76 on June 26, 2016. He lost the bout via split decision and was eliminated from the tournament.

==== DEEP Strawweight Champion ====
Ochi bounced back from this loss with a three fight winning streak over Altantsetseg Uuganbayar, Yutaro Muramoto and Kosuke Suzuki which led him to a chance to fight for the DEEP Strawweight title in a rematch with Kanta Sato. Ochi won the fight by a second round guillotine choke.

Ochi's first title defense was against the former DEEP flyweight title challenger Yuya Shibata at Deep Cage Impact in Osaka on October 8, 2018. Ochi implemented a pressuring game, using his strikes to set up takedowns, winning a unanimous decision and all three rounds of the bout.

=== Rizin Fighting Federation ===
In 2018 Haruo Ochi signed a non-exclusive contract with Rizin Fighting Federation. His first fight with the organization was a super fight between Ochi, the DEEP strawweight champion, and Mitsuhisa Sunabe, the prevailing Pancrase Flyweight Champion at Rizin 13 on September 30, 2018. The bout was contested at strawweight. The first two rounds were largely grappling exchanges, with Ochi controlling Sunabe on the ground. In the third round, Ochi managed to knock his opponent down with hooks to the head and body, and followed up with a soccer kick, winning the fight by a third-round TKO.

Moving back to DEEP, Ochi defended his title against Namiki Kawahara at DEEP 88 on March 9, 2019. Ochi won the fight by a unanimous decision.

Ochi would return to Rizin to fight on August 18, 2019, at Rizin 18, facing the former UFC fighter Jarred Brooks. The fight was stopped after only 10 seconds, due to an accidental clash of heads. The pair was rescheduled to fight during Rizin and Bellator MMA cross promotional event, Bellator 237. Brooks implemented his wrestling game, and won a unanimous decision.

==== Post title reign ====
Ochi was scheduled to make his third title defense, in a rematch against Namiki Kawahara, during DEEP 96. During the first round of the title defense, Ochi was able to take Kawahara down and briefly control him on the ground, before Kawahara scrambled back to his feet. During the striking exchange that followed, Namiki landed a knee to Ochi's midsection which forced Haruo to fight defensively for the remainder of the round. In the second round Ochi once again shot for a double leg takedown, to which Kawahara responded by moving back to the fence. In the ensuing scramble Kawahara managed to take Ochi's back, and after a failed attempt to slam out of the back control, Kawahara managed to finish Ochi with a rear naked choke.

Ochi returned to mixed martial arts following a 13-month absence from the sport, in his first fight post-title loss, to face Kazuki Shibuya at DEEP 103 Impact on September 23, 2021. Ochi won the fight by unanimous decision, with all three judges awarding him a 29-28 scorecard.

Ochi faced Tatsuya So at Rizin 32 - Okinawa on November 20, 2021. He won the bout via unanimous decision.

Ochi faced Sho Sekihara at DEEP 106 on February 26, 2022, in his third fight at flyweight since moving up in weight. He lost the fight by unanimous decision, with all three judges scoring the bout 29-28 in favor of Sekihara.

On July 18, 2022, DEEP announced that Ochi is participating the promotion's 16-man Flyweight Grand Prix and is scheduled to face Ryosuke Honda in the first round taking place at DEEP 109 on August 21, 2022. He lost the bout via split decision.

Ochi faced Masato Nakamura at DEEP 111 Impact on December 11, 2022, winning the bout via first round guillotine choke.

Ochi faced Woo Jae Kim at DEEP Tokyo Impact 2022 7th Round on May 27, 2023. He won the fight by a third-round submission.

==== Second DEEP title reign ====
Ochi faced Yusuke Uehara for the interim DEEP Strawweight championship at DEEP 117 Impact on December 10, 2023. He won the fight by a first-round knockout.

Ochi challenged the DEEP Strawweight champion Namiki Kawahara at DEEP Tokyo Impact 2024 3rd Round on May 26, 2024. He won the fight by a first-round submission.

Ochi was expected to face Nobuyoshi Nakatsukasa at DEEP 123 Impact on December 8, 2024. Nakatsukasa withdrew with an injury on November 12, 2024, and was replaced by Rikito Tago. Ochi won the fight by split decision, with scores of 29—28, 29—28 and 28—29.

Ochi faced Nobuyoshi Nakatsukasa at Rizin 50 on March 29, 2025. He won the fight by a third-round submission.

Ochi made his first DEEP Strawweight title defense against the undefeated Sora Sugiyama at DEEP Tokyo Impact 2025 6th Round on December 14, 2025. He lost the fight by unanimous decision.

=== Retirement ===
On May 15, 2026, it was announced that Ochi would be held a retirement ceremony in DEEP 132 Impact on July 5. The ceremony consisted of an exhibition match where he fought his training partners Yutaka Saito, Shintaro Ishiwata, and Masakatsu Ueda.

== Championship and accomplishments ==
- DEEP
  - DEEP Strawweight World Championship (Two time)
    - Two successful title defenses
- Fight Matrix
  - Strawweight Lineal Championship (One time; former)

== Mixed martial arts record ==
Professional record breakdown
42 matches	27 wins	12 losses
By knockout	8	0
By submission	9	1
By decision	10	11
Draws	2	
No contests	1	

Res.	Record	Opponent	Method	Event	Date	Round	Time	Location	Notes
Loss	27–12–2 (1)	Sora Sugiyama	Decision (unanimous)	DEEP Tokyo Impact 2025 6th Round	December 14, 2025	3	5:00	Tokyo, Japan	Lost the DEEP Strawweight championship.
Win	27–11–2 (1)	Nobuyoshi Nakatsukasa	Submission (guillotine choke)	Rizin 50	March 29, 2025	3	1:22	Takamatsu, Japan	
Win	26–11–2 (1)	Rikito Tago	Decision (split)	DEEP 123 Impact	December 8, 2024	3	5:00	Tokyo, Japan	Non-title bout.
Win	25–11–2 (1)	Namiki Kawahara	Submission (guillotine choke)	DEEP Tokyo Impact 2024 3rd Round	May 26, 2024	1	1:59	Tokyo, Japan	Won and unified the DEEP Strawweight championship.
Win	24–11–2 (1)	Yusuke Uehara	KO (slam)	DEEP 117 Impact	10 December 2023	1	3:31	Tokyo, Japan	Return to Strawweight. Won the interim DEEP Strawweight championship.
Win	23–11–2 (1)	Kim Woo-jae	Technical Submission (guillotine choke)	DEEP Tokyo Impact 2023 4th Round	28 May 2023	3	2:42	Tokyo, Japan	
Win	22–11–2 (1)	Masato Nakamura	Submission (guillotine choke)	DEEP 111 Impact	11 December 2022	1	2:31	Tokyo, Japan	Catchweight (121 lb) bout.
Loss	21–11–2 (1)	Ryosuke Honda	Decision (split)	DEEP 109 Impact	21 August 2022	3	5:00	Tokyo, Japan	2022 DEEP Flyweight Grand Prix First Round.
Loss	21–10–2 (1)	Sho Sekihara	Decision (unanimous)	DEEP 106 Impact	26 February 2022	3	5:00	Tokyo, Japan	
Win	21–9–2 (1)	Tatsuya So	Decision (unanimous)	Rizin 32	20 November 2021	3	5:00	Okinawa, Japan	
Win	20–9–2 (1)	Kazuki Shibuya	Decision (unanimous)	DEEP 103 Impact	23 September 2021	3	5:00	Tokyo, Japan	Return to Flyweight.
Loss	19–9–2 (1)	Namiki Kawahara	Technical Submission (rear-naked choke)	DEEP 96	23 August 2020	2	4:43	Tokyo, Japan	Lost the DEEP Strawweight championship.
Loss	19–8–2 (1)	Jarred Brooks	Decision (unanimous)	Bellator 237	28 December 2019	3	5:00	Saitama, Japan	
NC	19–7–2 (1)	Jarred Brooks	NC (accidental clash of heads)	Rizin 18	18 August 2019	1	0:10	Nagoya, Japan	Accidental clash of heads rendered Ochi unable to continue.
Win	19–7–2	Namiki Kawahara	Decision (unanimous)	Deep - 88 Impact	9 March 2019	3	5:00	Tokyo, Japan	Defended the DEEP Strawweight championship.
Win	18–7–2	Mitsuhisa Sunabe	KO (punch and soccer kicks)	Rizin 13	30 Sep 2018	3	2:53	Saitama, Japan	
Win	17–7–2	Yuya Shibata	Decision (unanimous)	Deep - Cage Impact 2018 in Osaka	8 April 2018	3	5:00	Osaka, Japan	Defended the DEEP Strawweight championship.
Win	16–7–2	Kanta Sato	Submission (guillotine choke)	Deep - 79 Impact	16 September 2017	2	N/A	Tokyo, Japan	Won the DEEP Strawweight championship.
Win	15–7–2	Kosuke Suzuki	Decision (unanimous)	Deep - Cage Impact 2017	13 May 2017	3	5:00	Tokyo, Japan	
Win	14–7–2	Yutaro Muramoto	Submission (guillotine choke)	Deep - Cage Impact 2016: Deep vs. WSOF-GC	17 December 2016	2	3:46	Tokyo, Japan	
Win	13–7–2	Altantsetseg Uuganbayar	Decision (unanimous)	MGL-1 Fighting Championship - MGL-1 vs. Deep	24 September 2016	3	5:00	Ulaanbaatar, Mongolia	
Loss	12–7–2	Kanta Sato	Decision (split)	Deep - 76 Impact	26 June 2016	3	5:00	Tokyo, Japan	DEEP Strawweight Grand Prix Semifinal.
Win	12–6–2	Joo Ho Son	TKO (punches)	Deep - 74 Impact	20 December 2015	2	2:37	Tokyo, Japan	Strawweight debut.
Loss	11–6–2	Sota Kojima	Decision (split)	Deep - Cage Impact 2015	20 July 2015	3	5:00	Tokyo, Japan	
Draw	11–5–2	Kota Ishibashi	Draw (unanimous)	Deep - 71 Impact	28 February 2015	2	5:00	Tokyo, Japan	
Loss	11–5–1	Yoshiro Maeda	Decision (majority)	Deep - Dream Impact 2014: Omisoka Special	31 December 2014	3	5:00	Saitama, Japan	
Win	11–4–1	Masakazu Imanari	TKO (doctor stoppage)	Deep - 67 Impact	22 June 2014	2	0:51	Tokyo, Japan	
Loss	10–4–1	Tatsumitsu Wada	Decision (unanimous)	Deep - 64 Impact	22 December 2013	3	5:00	Tokyo, Japan	
Win	10–3–1	Chikara Shimabukuro	Submission (guillotine choke)	Deep - Tokyo Impact: Wave 6	14 October 2013	1	4:40	Tokyo, Japan	
Loss	9–3–1	Ryuichi Miki	Decision (unanimous)	Shooto - 12th Round	11 November 2012	3	5:00	Tokyo, Japan	
Win	9–2–1	Kiyotaka Shimizu	Decision (majority)	Shooto - 3rd Round	10 March 2012	3	5:00	Tokyo, Japan	
Win	8–2–1	Masaaki Sugawara	TKO (punches)	Shooto - Survivor Tournament Final	8 January 2012	1	1:02	Tokyo, Japan	
Win	7–2–1	Ryuichi Miki	Decision (split)	Shooto: Shootor's Legacy 4	23 September 2011	2	5:00	Tokyo, Japan	
Win	6–2–1	Kosuke Suzuki	KO (punch)	Shooto: Gig Tokyo 6	28 May 2011	2	2:10	Tokyo, Japan	
Win	5–2–1	Hiroaki Ijima	Decision (unanimous)	Shooto: The Way of Shooto 6: Like a Tiger, Like a Dragon	19 November 2010	2	5:00	Tokyo, Japan	
Loss	4–2–1	Keita Kono	Decision (unanimous)	Shooto: Shooting Disco 11: Tora Tora Tora!	27 February 2010	2	5:00	Tokyo, Japan	
Draw	4–1–1	Keita Yoshida	Draw (majority)	Shooto: The Rookie Tournament 2009 Final	13 December 2009	3	5:00	Tokyo, Japan	Shooto Flyweight Tournament Finals.
Win	4–1	Tsuyoshi Okada	Technical Submission (armbar)	Shooto: Grapplingman 8	17 May 2009	1	2:16	Tokyo, Japan	Shooto Flyweight Tournament Semi Finals.
Win	3–1	Seiji Akao	TKO (corner stoppage)	Shooto: Gig Tokyo 2	19 April 2009	1	2:18	Tokyo, Japan	Shooto Flyweight Tournament First Round.
Loss	2–1	Kosuke Eda	Decision (unanimous)	Shooto: Shooting Disco 6: Glory Shines In You	5 October 2008	2	5:00	Tokyo, Japan	
Win	2–0	Yuta Nezu	Submission (bulldog choke)	Shooto: Shooto Tradition 2	18 July 2008	1	3:42	Tokyo, Japan	
Win	1–0	Masumi Tozawa	KO (slam)	Shooto: Shooting Disco 4: Born in the Fighting	23 February 2008	1	3:11	Tokyo, Japan	Flyweight debut.

== See also ==
- List of male mixed martial artists
