= Mohammed Shahid (MMA) =

Bahraini businessman and president of BRAVE CF

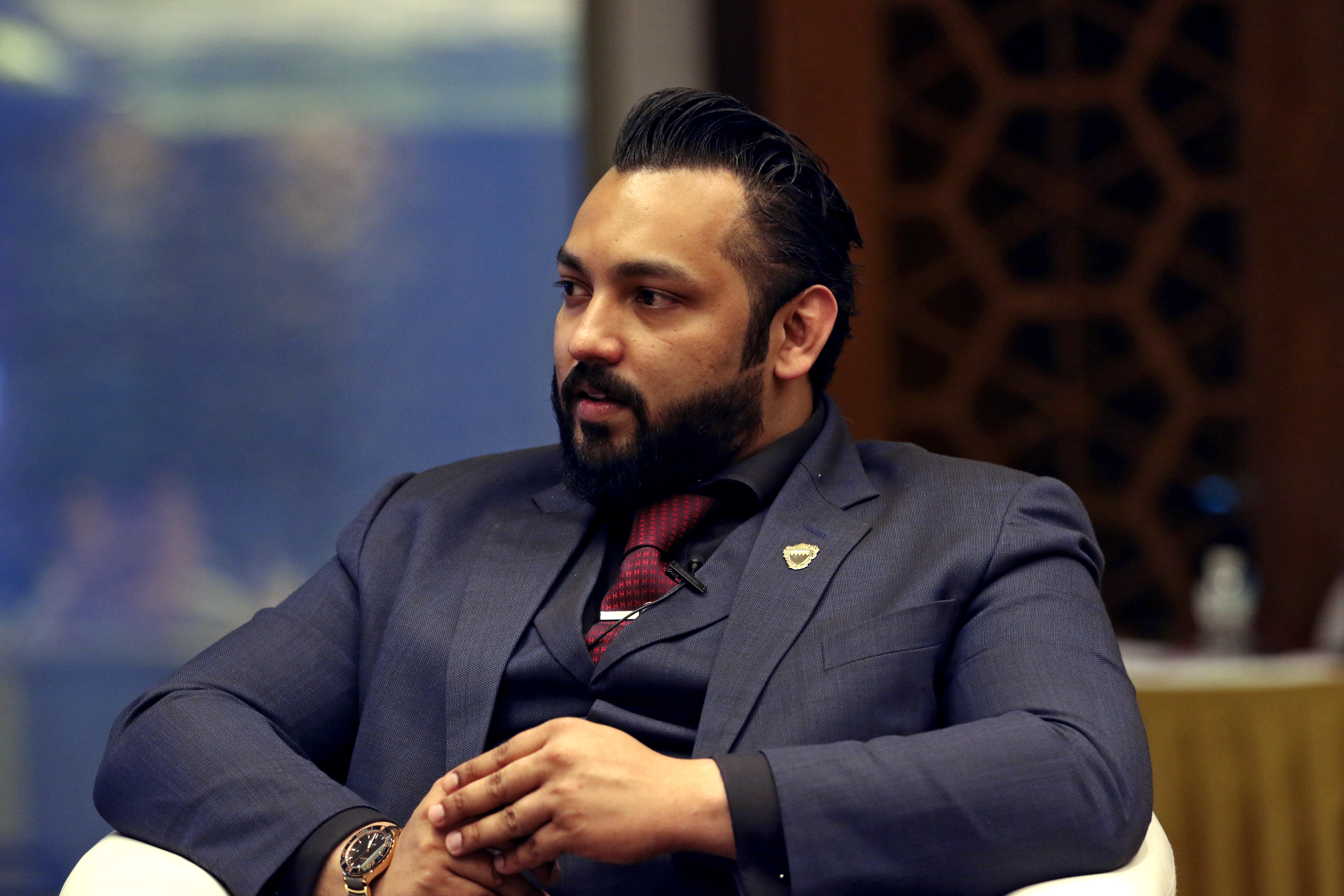
- Born: Mohammed Shahid; July 8, 1989 (age 36); Manama, Bahrain
- Other names: The Hawk
- Height: 5 ft 11 in (1.80 m)
- Weight: 169 lb (76.65 kg)
- Team: KHK MMA

Other information
- Occupation: President, Brave Combat Federation

Mohammed Shahid (born July 8, 1989) is a Bahraini businessman and mixed martial artist who serves as president of the Brave Combat Federation, a Bahrain-based global mixed martial arts organization.

He was the first mixed martial artist to represent Bahrain in a global MMA event. He is the advisor to President of the Bahrain Olympic Committee and the founder of the KHK MMA fight team.

== Career ==
Mohammed Shahid started his career as a mixed martial artist and then transitioned into management at KHK MMA and later became the president of the Brave Combat Federation.

=== KHK MMA ===
Mohammed Shahid was assigned to develop mixed martial arts in Bahrain as the CEO of KHK MMA. Bahrain established a national team alongside bringing global talent to facilitate the growth of MMA in Bahrain. The alumnus at KHK MMA fight team includes former UFC lightweight champion, Khabib Nurmagomedov, John Kavanagh, Frankie Edgar, Hamza Kooheji, and Jose Torres.

=== BRAVE Combat Federation ===
Mohammed Shahid was appointed as the first President of the BRAVE Combat Federation. As the President of BRAVE Combat Federation, Mohammed Shahid announced the partnership with International Mixed Martial Arts Federation to host the IMMAF World Championships in November 2017, which kept renewed till 2023. Till date, with Mohammed Shahid as the President, Brave Combat Federation has organized 74 events in 29 nations after its formation on 23 September 2016. Since Brave Combat Federation was launched back in July 2016, the promotion has held shows in Bahrain, Brazil, UAE, India, and Kazakhstan.

In 2018, Mohammed Shahid revealed a partnership with MTV, the youth channel from Viacom18 to host the 30th edition of the event in India. In 2019, Brave Combat Federation and ESPN5 announce partnership for entry into Philippines in a press conference with the Brave president Mohammed Shahid and TV5 president Vincent "Chot" Reyes. In July 2021, Mohammed Shahid was nominated for the Leading Man Of The Year award at the World MMA Awards. In May 2023, Mohammed Shahid announced a partnership with French promotion Hexagone MMA and Brave Combat Federation for a special co-promoted event in Nantes, France on Thursday, 7 September 2023.

=== Mixed Martial Arts career ===
Mohammed Shahid started his career as a professional fighter in the Super Fight League. He became the first fighter from GCC to be featured in the Super Fight League. He holds a record of 4-2-0 in his professional career.

Professional record breakdown
6 matches	4 wins	2 losses
By knockout	3	1
By submission	0	1
By decision	1	0

Res.	Record	Opponent	Method	Event	Date	Round	Time	Location	Notes
Win	4–2	Prince Alamgeer Khan	TKO (Punches and Elbows)	SFL 38 - India vs. Pakistan	February 27, 2015	1	2:50	Dubai, United Arab Emirates	
Win	3–2	Mohammad Younus Bayat	TKO (Doctor Stoppage)	BFMMA - BodyForce MMA 1	October 10, 2014	1	2:55	Bangalore, India	
Loss	3–1	Satendar Bankura	Submission	SFL 24-25 - Super Fight League 24-25	August 31, 2013	1	0:52	Mumbai, India	
Win	2–1	Abdul Hamid	TKO (Knees)	SFL 16 - Super Fight League 16	August 26, 2013	3	3:17	Mumbai, India	
Loss	1–1	Vikas Singh Ruhil	DQ (Illegal Knee to Grounded Opponent)	SFL 14 - Super Fight League 14	March 29, 2013	1	0:20	Mumbai, India	
Win	1–0	Mayura Dissanayake	SFL 1 - Super Fight League 1	URCC 5 - Beyond Fear	March 11, 2012	3	5:00	Mumbai, India	

=== KHK Cricket ===
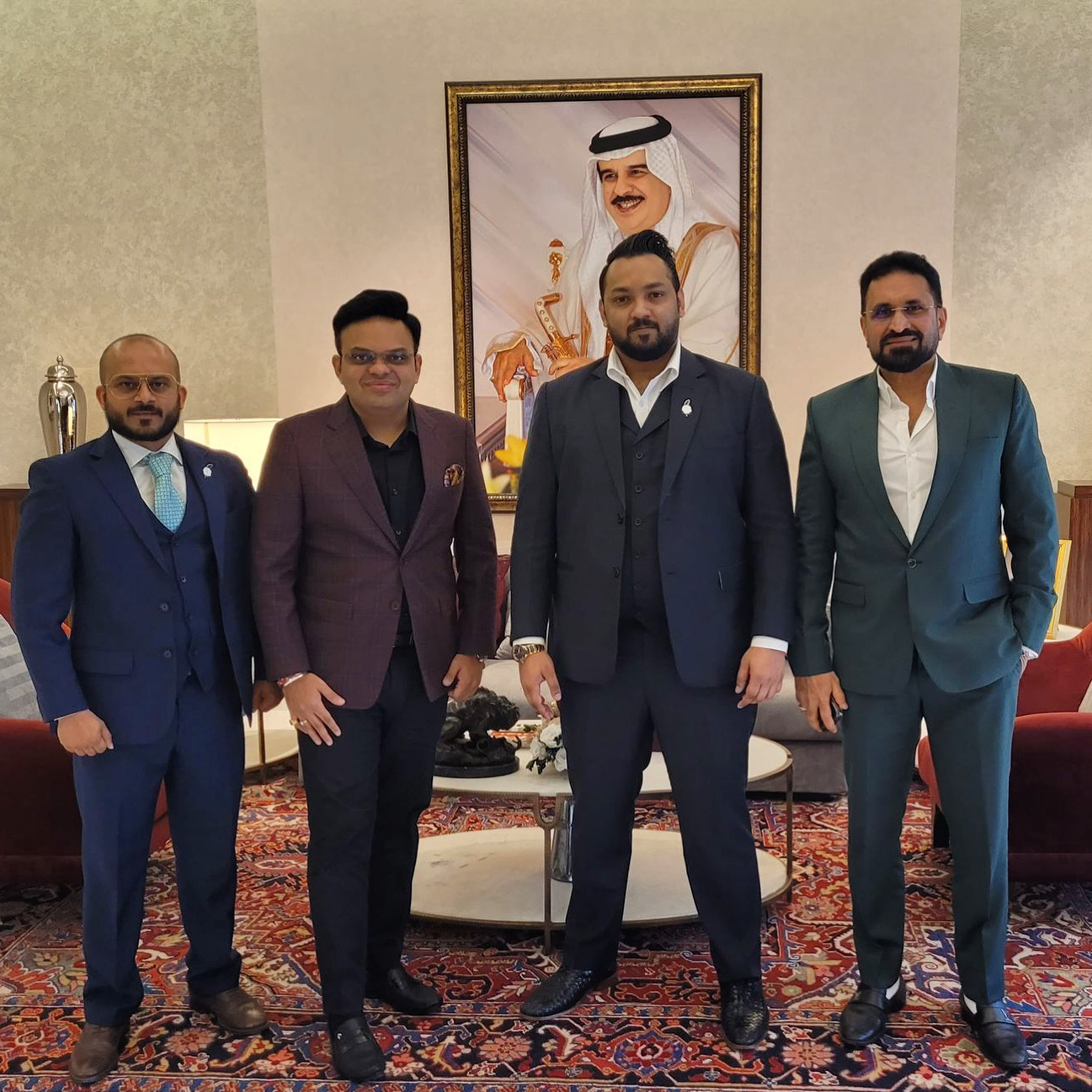
Mohammed Shahid invites Jay Shah, Chairman of the board of directors of the International Cricket Council to Bahrain

Mohammed Shahid helmed as the CEO of KHK Sports to launch KHK Cricket. KHK Cricket introduced franchise-based cricket league in Bahrain, Bahrain Premier League 2018. The initiative launched on 6 December 2017, aimed to bring cricket to the mainstream with live broadcasts on Bahrain National Television, digital campaigns, and with Coca-Cola as title sponsor. In 2018, Bahrain Premier League (BPL) was hosted with six franchise squads comprising on 13 member-squads each. The tournament was hosted from 26 January 2018 to 9 March 2018 at the Isa Town Cricket ground, Bahrain.

KHK Cricket introduced an 8-team women's league, leading Bahrain's women's team to six world records and winning the ICC Women's Initiative of the Year Award. Bahrain secured 25th in ICC T20 rankings, and secured government support to construct a world-class stadium under the patronage of Sheikh Khalid bin Hamad Al Khalifa, alongside a temporary ground, setting the stage for future success. Inviting Jay Shah, Bahrain hosted the first Board Meeting of Asian Cricket Council in Bahrain.

== Awards & Recognition ==
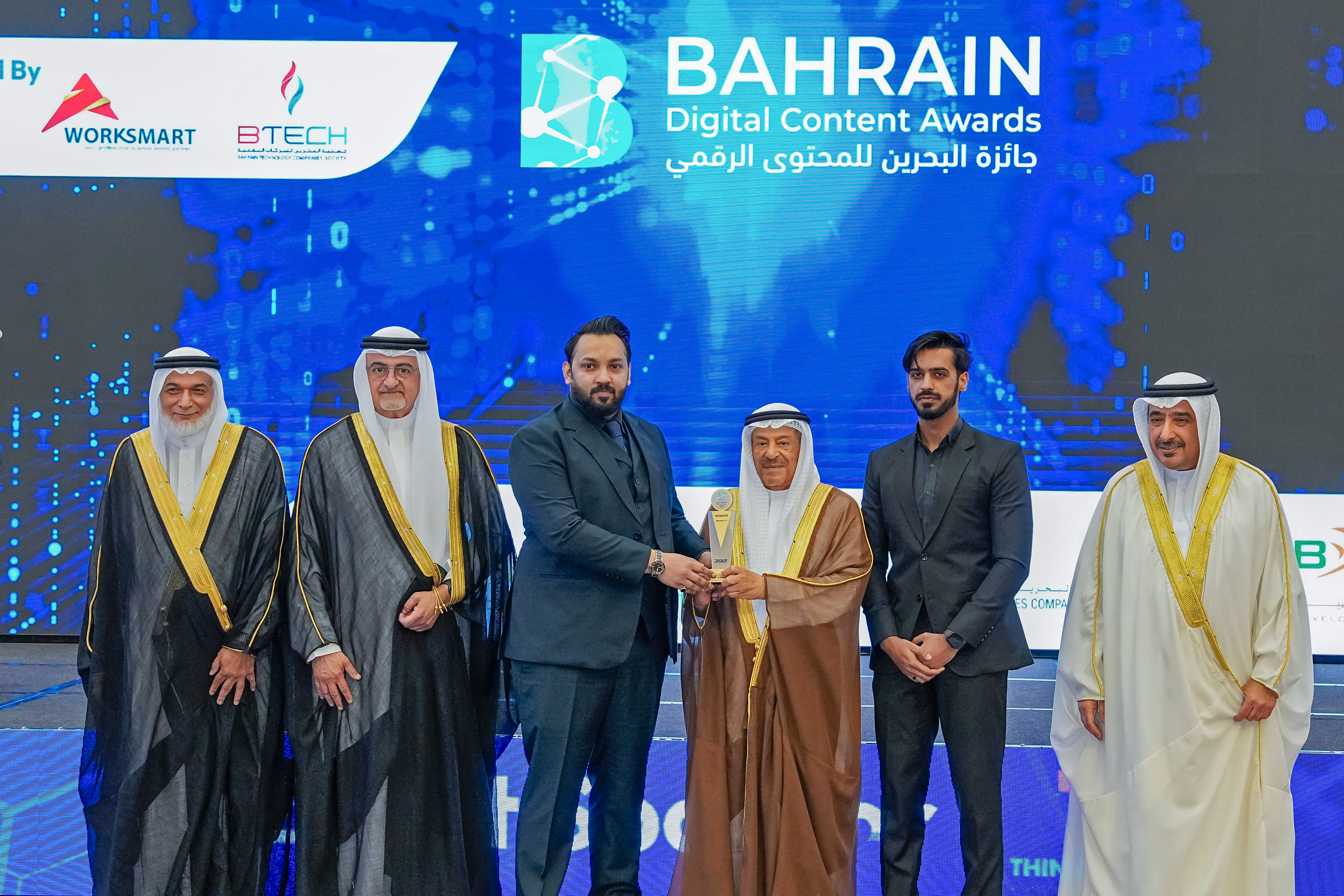
BRAVE TV receiving the Bahrain Digital Content Award (BDCA) for Excellence in the Media and E-Information sector

Mohammed Shahid has been awarded for his contribution in sports ecosystem and for initiating digitized business operations in the Kingdom of Bahrain. In 2025, BRAVE TV was nationally recognized by the Bahrain Technology Companies Society (BTECH) under the patronage of H.E. Ali Bin Saleh Al Saleh.

BRAVE TV under Brave Combat Federation, is the first Bahraini OTT platform that broadcast events, athlete stories, documentaries, and exclusive behind-the-scenes footage. Also, he had been nominated by World MMA Awards for the Leading Man Of The Year award category alongside Dana White in July 2021.

Year	Award	Category	Status
2021	World MMA Awards	Leading Man Of The Year	Nominee
2024	The Times of Bahrain	Sports Icon Award	Awarded
2025	Bahrain Digital Content Award (BDCA)	Excellence in the Media and E-Information	Awarded
2025	Best Practice in eParticipation Award (Private Sector)	eGovernment Excellence Awards 2025	Awarded
