= Jarred Brooks =

American mixed martial artist

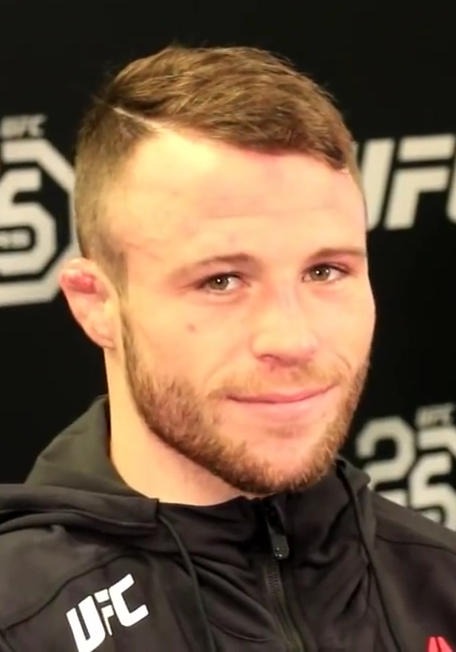
- Brooks in 2018
- Born: Jarred Brooks Ford; May 2, 1993 (age 33); Warsaw, Indiana, U.S.
- Other names: The Monkey God
- Height: 5 ft 3 in (1.60 m)
- Weight: 125 lb (57 kg; 8.9 st)
- Division: Bantamweight; Flyweight; Strawweight
- Reach: 62 in (157 cm)
- Fighting out of: Detroit, Michigan, U.S.
- Team: Mash Fight Team; Roots Combat Club
- Wrestling: NCAA Division II wrestling
- Years active: 2014–present

Mixed martial arts record
- Total: 29
- Wins: 22
- By knockout: 2
- By submission: 9
- By decision: 11
- Losses: 6
- By knockout: 2
- By submission: 1
- By decision: 2
- By disqualification: 1
- No contests: 1

Other information
- Mixed martial arts record from Sherdog

Jarred Brooks Ford (born May 2, 1993) known professionally as Jarred Brooks, is an American professional mixed martial artist currently competing in ONE Championship, where he is the former ONE Strawweight World Champion and former Interim ONE Strawweight World Champion. A professional since 2014, he has also competed for the Ultimate Fighting Championship (UFC), Pancrase, Rizin Fighting Federation, and the World Series of Fighting (WSOF) (now Professional Fighters League).

== Background ==
Born and raised in Warsaw, Indiana, Brooks began wrestling from a young age alongside his brother. Competing in the 113 lb. weight class, Brooks was highly talented and a touted prospect coming out of high school, being ranked first overall in the nation for his weight class as a senior. During his junior season, Brooks entered the state tournament with a record of 27–1, making it to the final before losing. During his senior season, Brooks compiled an undefeated 35–0 record, capturing the state championship in the process. After originally attending Indiana Tech, he later transferred to Notre Dame College before focusing on a career in MMA.

== Mixed martial arts career ==
=== Early career ===
Before joining the UFC, Brooks compiled a record of 12–0 consisting of a variety of different finishes along the way, and also held an amateur record of 28–1, capturing ten titles. His most notable wins before signing with UFC was the four time Shooto title challenger Junji Ito and Abdiel Velazquez when he became the House of Fame flyweight champion.

=== Ultimate Fighting Championship ===
Brooks was expected to face Ian McCall on February 11, 2017, at UFC 208. However, McCall was pulled from the fight the day it was scheduled to take place due to gastrointestinal illness.

Brooks made his promotional debut on July 29, 2017, at UFC 214 against TUF 24 semi-finalist Eric Shelton. He won the fight by split decision.

Brooks faced Deiveson Figueiredo on October 28, 2017, at UFC Fight Night: Machida vs. Brunson. He lost the bout via a controversial split decision.

Brooks was expected to face Hector Sandoval on June 1, 2018, at UFC Fight Night 131. However, Sandoval was removed from the bout on May 22 for undisclosed reasons and replaced by promotional newcomer Jose Torres. Brooks lost the fight in round two after he attempted to slam Torres, but accidentally knocked himself out in the process.

Brooks was tabbed as a short notice replacement to face Roberto Sanchez on September 8, 2018, at UFC 228. He won the fight via split decision.

On November 7, 2018, it was reported Brooks was released from UFC.

=== Rizin ===
After being released from the UFC, Brooks signed with Rizin FF and made his promotional debut against Haruo Ochi at Rizin 18 on August 18, 2019. The bout ended in a no contest due to an accidental headbutt early in the first round.

Brooks next fought with Warrior Xtreme Cagefighting at WXC 83, when he faced the undefeated Legacy Fighting Alliance veteran, Victor Altamirano. Brooks would dominate throughout the fight, and won by a rear-naked choke in the second round.

Brooks' next fight was a return to strawweight, during Bellator Japan, when he re-matched the highly rated DEEP strawweight champion Haruo Ochi. Brooks won a unanimous decision. This would lead many media outlets and fight analysts to name Brooks as the world's best strawweight.

=== ONE Championship ===
Brooks signed a contract with ONE Championship, and was expected to make his promotional debut against Lito Adiwang at ONE on TNT 2 on April 14, 2021. Adiwang would later withdraw from the bout, due to a positive COVID-19 test. The bout was rescheduled for ONE Championship: NextGen III on November 26, 2021. He won the bout via arm-triangle choke in the second round.

Brooks faced Hiroba Minowa at ONE: Only the Brave on January 28, 2022. Brooks won the bout in dominant fashion via unanimous decision.

Brooks faced Bokang Masuyane at ONE 156 on April 22, 2022. Masuyane missed weight at the official weigh-ins and forfeited 20% of his purse to Brooks. Brooks won the fight by a first-round technical submission.

==== ONE Strawweight World Champion ====
Brooks was scheduled to face the ONE Strawweight World Championship bout against Joshua Pacio at ONE 158 on June 3, 2022. However, the bout was eventually postponed, as Brooks withdrew from the fight due to an injury. The fight was rescheduled at ONE 164 on December 3, 2022. Brooks won the fight and the belt by unanimous decision.

Brooks made his first title defense against Joshua Pacio in a rematch on March 1, 2024, at ONE 166. Brooks lost the fight via disqualification due to an illegal slam.

Brooks faced Gustavo Balart for the interim ONE Strawweight World Championship on August 3, 2024, at ONE Fight Night 24. At the weigh-ins, Balart came in at 126 lb (after coming in at 131.75 lb in his first attempt), 1 pounds over the limit. As a result, Balart was fined 25% of his purse and was ineligible for the title, only Brooks was eligible to win the title. He won the fight via a rear-naked choke in round one.

Brooks faced Reece McLaren in a flyweight bout on December 7, 2024, at ONE Fight Night 26. He lost the fight via split decision.

Brooks faced Joshua Pacio in a trilogy bout, for the ONE Strawweight World Championship unification bout on February 20, 2025, at ONE 171. He would lose the bout via technical knockout late in the second round.

== Professional grappling career ==
Brooks describes his style as catch wrestling.

Brooks challenged Mikey Musumeci for the ONE Championship flyweight submission grappling world title at ONE Fight Night 13 on August 5, 2023. He was submitted with a triangle/armbar and lost the match.

== Personal life ==
Brooks is expecting his first child together with his girlfriend, Francesa Ann Dimambro, due on November 14, 2023.

== Championships and accomplishments ==
=== Mixed martial arts ===
- House of Fame
  - House of Fame Flyweight Championship (One time)
- Fight Matrix
  - Strawweight Lineal Champion (One time, former)
- ONE Championship
  - ONE Strawweight World Championship (One time, former)

== Mixed martial arts record ==
Professional record breakdown
29 matches	22 wins	6 losses
By knockout	2	2
By submission	9	1
By decision	11	2
By disqualification	0	1
No contests	1	

Res.	Record	Opponent	Method	Event	Date	Round	Time	Location	Notes
Win	22–6 (1)	Tatsumitsu Wada	Decision (split)	ONE Samurai 5	November 18, 2026	3	5:00	Tokyo, Japan	
Loss	21–6 (1)	Mansur Malachiev	Technical Submission (north-south choke)	ONE Fight Night 36	October 4, 2025	2	2:09	Bangkok, Thailand	Bantamweight bout.
Loss	21–5 (1)	Joshua Pacio	TKO (punches)	ONE 171	February 20, 2025	2	4:22	Lusail, Qatar	For the ONE Strawweight Championship (125 lb).
Loss	21–4 (1)	Reece McLaren	Decision (split)	ONE Fight Night 26	December 7, 2024	3	5:00	Bangkok, Thailand	Bantamweight bout.
Win	21–3 (1)	Gustavo Balart	Submission (rear-naked choke)	ONE Fight Night 24	August 3, 2024	1	4:39	Bangkok, Thailand	Won the interim ONE Strawweight Championship (125 lb). Balart missed weight (126 lb) and was ineligible for the title.
Loss	20–3 (1)	Joshua Pacio	DQ (illegal slam)	ONE 166	March 1, 2024	1	0:56	Lusail, Qatar	Lost the ONE Strawweight Championship (125 lb).
Win	20–2 (1)	Joshua Pacio	Decision (unanimous)	ONE 164	December 3, 2022	5	5:00	Pasay, Philippines	Won the ONE Strawweight Championship (125 lb).
Win	19–2 (1)	Bokang Masunyane	Technical Submission (rear-naked choke)	ONE 156	April 22, 2022	1	4:39	Kallang, Singapore	ONE Strawweight title eliminator; Masunyane missed weight (128 lb).
Win	18–2 (1)	Hiroba Minowa	Decision (unanimous)	ONE: Only the Brave	January 28, 2022	3	5:00	Kallang, Singapore	
Win	17–2 (1)	Lito Adiwang	Submission (arm-triangle choke)	ONE: NextGen 3	November 26, 2021	2	3:07	Kallang, Singapore	
Win	16–2 (1)	Haruo Ochi	Decision (unanimous)	Bellator & Rizin: Japan	December 29, 2019	3	5:00	Saitama, Japan	Strawweight bout.
Win	15–2 (1)	Victor Altamirano	Submission (rear-naked choke)	WXC 83: Warrior Wednesday 8	October 30, 2019	2	4:19	Southgate, Michigan, United States	
NC	14–2 (1)	Haruo Ochi	NC (accidental clash of heads)	Rizin 18	August 18, 2019	1	0:11	Nagoya, Japan	Strawweight bout. Accidental clash of heads rendered Ochi unable to continue.
Win	14–2	Roberto Sanchez	Decision (split)	UFC 228	September 8, 2018	3	5:00	Dallas, Texas, United States	
Loss	13–2	Jose Torres	KO (slam)	UFC Fight Night: Rivera vs. Moraes	June 1, 2018	2	2:55	Utica, New York, United States	Brooks knocked himself out attempting to slam Torres.
Loss	13–1	Deiveson Figueiredo	Decision (split)	UFC Fight Night: Brunson vs. Machida	October 28, 2017	3	5:00	São Paulo, Brazil	
Win	13–0	Eric Shelton	Decision (split)	UFC 214	July 29, 2017	3	5:00	Anaheim, California, United States	Return to Flyweight.
Win	12–0	Jun Nakamura	KO (punch)	Pancrase 281	October 2, 2016	2	1:23	Tokyo, Japan	Strawweight bout.
Win	11–0	Corey Simmons	Submission (rear-naked choke)	Fight Night at the Island: Saunders vs. Volkmann	September 9, 2016	1	2:36	Welch, Minnesota, United States	
Win	10–0	Erik Vo	Submission (rear-naked choke)	Pinnacle Combat 23	April 29, 2016	1	3:05	Dubuque, Iowa, United States	Bantamweight debut.
Win	9–0	Chris Miah	Decision (unanimous)	WFCA 16	March 12, 2016	3	5:00	Grozny, Russia	Return to Flyweight.
Win	8–0	Junji Ito	KO (elbows)	WSOF Global 2	February 7, 2016	2	3:29	Tokyo, Japan	Strawweight debut.
Win	7–0	Abdiel Velazquez	Decision (unanimous)	House of Fame 4: Florida vs. Georgia	October 29, 2015	3	5:00	Jacksonville, Florida, United States	Won the vacant HOF Flyweight Championship.
Win	6–0	Trevor Ward	Decision (unanimous)	Michiana Fight League 38	June 11, 2015	3	5:00	South Bend, Indiana, United States	
Win	5–0	Joey Diehl	Decision (unanimous)	Michiana Fight League 37	March 28, 2015	3	5:00	South Bend, Indiana, United States	
Win	4–0	Cee Jay Hamilton	Decision (split)	Alpha One Sports: IT Fight Series 30	January 30, 2015	3	5:00	Bellefontaine, Ohio, United States	
Win	3–0	Marshawn Hughes	Submission (arm-triangle choke)	Legends of Fighting 55	November 21, 2014	1	0:57	Indianapolis, Indiana, United States	
Win	2–0	Arthur Parker	Submission (rear-naked choke)	Absolute FC 22	September 19, 2014	1	1:23	Hollywood, Florida, United States	
Win	1–0	Chris Catala	Submission	Xplode Fight Series: Lock Down	August 9, 2014	1	0:21	Davenport, Iowa, United States	Flyweight debut.

== Amateur mixed martial arts record ==
Amateur record breakdown		
13 matches	13 wins	0 losses
By knockout	2	0
By submission	9	0
By decision	2	0

Res.	Record	Opponent	Method	Event	Date	Round	Time	Location	Notes
Win	13–0	Jay Edwards	Submission (rear-naked choke)	MFL 34	May 17, 2014	2	1:32	South Bend, Indiana, United States	Defended the MFL Amateur Flyweight Title
Win	12–0	Levi Rose	Submission (verbal submission)	ELE - Extreme Combat Challenge	March 29, 2014	2	1:25	Muncie, IN, United States	Bantamweight bout
Win	11–0	Christopher Tanner	Submission (strikes)	AoW 9 - The Return	February 1, 2014	1	2:53	Indianapolis, United States	For the AoW Amateur Flyweight Title
Win	10–0	Christopher Tanner	Submission (armbar)	MFL 31	August 23, 2013	1	2:15	South Bend, Indiana, United States	For the MFL Amateur Flyweight Title
Win	9–0	Isaac Flores	TKO	Misfit MMA 06/01/13	June 1, 2013	2	1:00	Holland, Michigan, United States	
Win	8–0	Daxton Guericke	Submission (armbar)	MFL 26	August 18, 2012	2	1:04	South Bend, Indiana, United States	
Win	7–0	Zach Spicher	Submission (rear-naked choke)	Elite Kagefighting Championship 2	July 28, 2012	1	2:25	Warsaw, Indiana, United States	Won the EKC Amateur Flyweight Title
Win	6–0	Mikeal Wood Jr.	Submission (guillotine choke)	MFL 25	June 2, 2012	1	0:19	South Bend, Indiana, United States	
Win	5–0	Matt Baker	Submission (rear-naked choke)	XXX Extreme Fighting: Judgement Day	October 1, 2011	1	2:17	Benton Harbor, United States	
Win	4–0	Dallas Berger	Submission (armbar)	Chaos at the Cove	September 2, 2011	1	2:58	South Bend, Indiana, United States	
Win	3–0	Dereck Dooley	TKO (corner stoppage)	XXX Extreme Fighting: Indiana vs Michigan 2	August 21, 2010	2	0:38	South Bend, Indiana, United States	
Win	2–0	Zach Sterling	Decision (unanimous)	Extreme Challenge 159	August 13, 2010	3	3:00	Elkhart, Indiana, United States	
Win	1–0	Vu Pham	Decision (unanimous)	Total Fight Series 2	July 10, 2010	3	5:00	Huntington, Indiana, United States	

== See also ==
- List of current ONE fighters
