= Brad Katona =

Canadian mixed martial artist

- Born: Bradley Devin Katona; December 19, 1991 (age 34); Winnipeg, Manitoba, Canada
- Other names: Superman
- Height: 5 ft 6 in (1.68 m)
- Weight: 135 lb (61 kg; 9 st 9 lb)
- Division: Bantamweight (2010–present); Featherweight (2018); Lightweight (2015)
- Reach: 64.5 in (164 cm)
- Fighting out of: Dublin, Ireland
- Team: Straight Blast Gym Ireland, Winnipeg Academy of Mixed Martial Arts
- Rank: Black belt in Brazilian Jiu-Jitsu; Black belt in Shotokan Karate
- Years active: 2010–present

Mixed martial arts record
- Total: 19
- Wins: 14
- By knockout: 1
- By submission: 3
- By decision: 10
- Losses: 5
- By knockout: 1
- By decision: 4

Amateur record
- Total: 3
- Wins: 3
- By submission: 3
- Losses: 0

Other information
- University: University of Manitoba (BSc)
- Mixed martial arts record from Sherdog

Bradley Devin Katona (born December 19, 1991) is a Canadian mixed martial artist who competed in the Bantamweight division of the Ultimate Fighting Championship (UFC). He is a former Brave CF Bantamweight Champion. He is also the only fighter to win The Ultimate Fighter twice, winning The Ultimate Fighter 27 featherweight tournament and The Ultimate Fighter 31 bantamweight tournament.

== Personal life and background ==
Katona was born in Winnipeg, Manitoba, Canada. He started training in karate at the age of five and earned his black belt at the age of 14. Katona graduated from Dakota Collegiate. He started Brazilian jiu-jitsu at Winnipeg Academy of Mixed Martial Arts. In 2011, Katona fought and won in the Canadian Golden Gloves championship and the Ringside World Championships in Kansas City, Missouri. He earned a degree in mechanical engineering from the University of Manitoba.

== Mixed martial arts career ==
=== Early career ===
Katona began competing in mixed martial arts in 2010 earning an amateur record of 3–0. After turning professional, he competed in smaller promotions, earning himself an unbeaten record of 6–0. Katona earned a degree as a mechanical engineer before deciding to focus fully on his MMA career in 2016. In 2017, he moved to Dublin to train with Straight Blast Gym Ireland under coach John Kavanagh.

=== The Ultimate Fighter: Undefeated ===
In November 2017, it was announced that Katona would be a cast member on The Ultimate Fighter: Undefeated competing in the featherweight tournament. On the show, Katona first defeated Kyler Phillips via majority decision and in the semi-finals he defeated Bryce Mitchell via third round submission (rear-naked choke). Katona then went on to win the final against Jay Cucciniello via a unanimous decision at The Ultimate Fighter 27 Finale. In doing so he became the third Canadian in the show's history to win the tournament and is also the first Canadian to win the competition outside of the TUF: Nations tournament format.

=== Ultimate Fighting Championship ===
Returning to bantamweight, Katona faced Matthew Lopez in a bout on December 8, 2018, at UFC 231. He won the fight by unanimous decision.

Katona next faced Merab Dvalishvili on May 4, 2019, at UFC on ESPN+ 9 in Ottawa, Ontario, Canada. Katona would lose the fight via unanimous decision.

Katona faced Hunter Azure on September 14, 2019, at UFC Fight Night: Cowboy vs. Gaethje. Despite moments of success Katona would lose the fight via unanimous decision.

Katona was released by the UFC on February 11, 2020. After going 2–2 in the promotion.

=== Brave Combat Federation ===
In September 2020, it was reported that Katona signed with Elite MMA Championship (EMC) and he was scheduled to meet Stipe Brčić on October 31, 2020, in the co-main event of EMC 6. However, the event was postponed due to the COVID-19 pandemic.

Katona faced Borislav Nikolić on April 1, 2021, at Brave CF 50. At weigh-ins, Katona came in 1.1 pounds (0.5 kg) over the bantamweight limit and was fined a percentage of his purse which went to his opponent. He won by guillotine in the third round.

Katona faced Bair Shtepin on August 21, 2021, at Brave CF 53. He won the bout via unanimous decision.

Katona defeated Hamza Kooheji on March 11, 2022, at Brave CF 57 for the vacant BRAVE CF Bantamweight Championship.

=== The Ultimate Fighter 31 ===
In March 2023, it was announced that Katona would make his second appearance on The Ultimate Fighter, fighting in the bantamweight division.

He was selected as a part of Team Chandler. In the quarterfinal Katona faced Carlos Vera, and won the fight via unanimous decision. He switched to Team McGregor in the semi-finals.

In the semi-final round, Katona faced former teammate Timur Valiev, and won the fight via split decision.

Katona faced former teammate Cody Gibson in the tournament final on August 19, 2023, at UFC 292. He won the fight via unanimous decision to win the tournament and become the only TUF fighter to win twice. The bout also won the Fight of the Night award.

=== Return to UFC ===
Katona faced Garrett Armfield on January 20, 2024, at UFC 297. He lost the bout by unanimous decision.

Katona faced Jesse Butler on June 8, 2024 at UFC on ESPN 57. He won the fight by unanimous decision.

Katona faced Jean Matsumoto on October 19, 2024 at UFC Fight Night 245. He lost the fight by unanimous decision.

Katona faced Bekzat Almakhan on May 10, 2025 at UFC 315. He lost the fight by knockout in the first round.

On June 17, 2025, it was reported that Katona was no longer on the UFC roster.

== Championships and accomplishments ==
- Ultimate Fighting Championship
  - The Ultimate Fighter 27 Featherweight Tournament Winner
  - The Ultimate Fighter 31 Bantamweight Tournament Winner
    - First and only 2-time winner of The Ultimate Fighter
  - Fight of the Night (One time) vs. Cody Gibson
  - UFC.com Awards
    - 2018: Ranked #6 Newcomer of the Year
- Brave Combat Federation
  - BRAVE CF Bantamweight Championship (One time)
    - One successful title defense

== Mixed martial arts record ==
Professional record breakdown
19 matches	14 wins	5 losses
By knockout	1	1
By submission	3	0
By decision	10	4

Res.	Record	Opponent	Method	Event	Date	Round	Time	Location	Notes
Loss	14–5	Bekzat Almakhan	KO (punches)	UFC 315	May 10, 2025	1	1:04	Montreal, Quebec, Canada	
Loss	14–4	Jean Matsumoto	Decision (unanimous)	UFC Fight Night: Hernandez vs. Pereira	October 19, 2024	3	5:00	Las Vegas, Nevada, United States	
Win	14–3	Jesse Butler	Decision (unanimous)	UFC on ESPN: Cannonier vs. Imavov	June 8, 2024	3	5:00	Louisville, Kentucky, United States	
Loss	13–3	Garrett Armfield	Decision (unanimous)	UFC 297	January 20, 2024	3	5:00	Toronto, Ontario, Canada	
Win	13–2	Cody Gibson	Decision (unanimous)	UFC 292	August 19, 2023	3	5:00	Boston, Massachusetts, United States	Won The Ultimate Fighter 31 Bantamweight tournament. Fight of the Night.
Win	12–2	Gamzat Magomedov	Decision (unanimous)	Brave CF 63	October 19, 2022	5	5:00	Isa Town, Bahrain	Defended the BRAVE CF Bantamweight Championship.
Win	11–2	Hamza Kooheji	Decision (split)	Brave CF 57	March 11, 2022	5	5:00	Isa Town, Bahrain	Won the vacant BRAVE CF Bantamweight Championship.
Win	10–2	Bair Shtepin	Decision (unanimous)	Brave CF 53	August 21, 2021	3	5:00	Almaty, Kazakhstan	
Win	9–2	Borislav Nikolić	Submission (guillotine choke)	Brave CF 50	April 1, 2021	3	0:40	Arad, Bahrain	
Loss	8–2	Hunter Azure	Decision (unanimous)	UFC Fight Night: Cowboy vs. Gaethje	September 14, 2019	3	5:00	Vancouver, British Columbia, Canada	
Loss	8–1	Merab Dvalishvili	Decision (unanimous)	UFC Fight Night: Iaquinta vs. Cowboy	May 4, 2019	3	5:00	Ottawa, Ontario, Canada	
Win	8–0	Matthew Lopez	Decision (unanimous)	UFC 231	December 8, 2018	3	5:00	Toronto, Ontario, Canada	Return to Bantamweight.
Win	7–0	Jay Cucciniello	Decision (unanimous)	The Ultimate Fighter: Undefeated Finale	July 6, 2018	3	5:00	Las Vegas, Nevada, United States	Won The Ultimate Fighter 27 Featherweight tournament.
Win	6–0	Stephen Cervantes	Decision (unanimous)	Mercenary Combat League 1	August 16, 2017	3	5:00	Winnipeg, Manitoba, Canada	
Win	5–0	Austin Ryan	Submission (kneebar)	XFFC 13: Future Stars	February 2017	3	4:49	Grande Prairie, Alberta, Canada	Return to Bantamweight.
Win	4–0	Patrick Ward	Decision (unanimous)	Havoc FC 11	December 2, 2016	3	5:00	Red Deer, Alberta, Canada	Featherweight debut.
Win	3–0	Josh Rich	Decision (unanimous)	Prestige FC 2	March 12, 2016	3	5:00	Regina, Saskatchewan, Canada	Return to Bantamweight.
Win	2–0	Myles Anderson	Submission (guillotine choke)	Prestige FC 1	September 24, 2015	1	3:12	Weyburn, Saskatchewan, Canada	Lightweight debut.
Win	1–0	Michael Hay	KO (punch)	MFC 41: All In	September 3, 2014	1	2:47	Edmonton, Alberta, Canada	Bantamweight debut.

== Mixed martial arts exhibition record ==
Exhibition record breakdown		
4 matches	4 wins	0 losses
By submission	1	0
By decision	3	0

Res.	Record	Opponent	Method	Event	Date	Round	Time	Location	Notes
Win	4–0	Timur Valiev	Decision (split)	The Ultimate Fighter: Team McGregor vs. Team Chandler	Aug 1, 2023 (airdate)	3	5:00	Las Vegas, Nevada, United States	The Ultimate Fighter 31 Semi-final round.
Win	3–0	Carlos Vera	Decision (unanimous)	The Ultimate Fighter: Team McGregor vs. Team Chandler	Jun 27, 2023 (airdate)	2	5:00	Las Vegas, Nevada, United States	The Ultimate Fighter 31 Quarterfinal round.
Win	2–0	Bryce Mitchell	Submission (rear-naked choke)	The Ultimate Fighter: Undefeated	Jun 20, 2018 (airdate)	3	4:17	Las Vegas, Nevada, United States	The Ultimate Fighter 27 Semi-final round.
Win	1–0	Kyler Phillips	Decision (majority)	The Ultimate Fighter: Undefeated	Apr 25, 2018 (airdate)	2	5:00	Las Vegas, Nevada, United States	The Ultimate Fighter 27 Quarterfinal round.

== See also ==
- List of male mixed martial artists
