= 2021 in Brave Combat Federation =

Brave Combat Federation
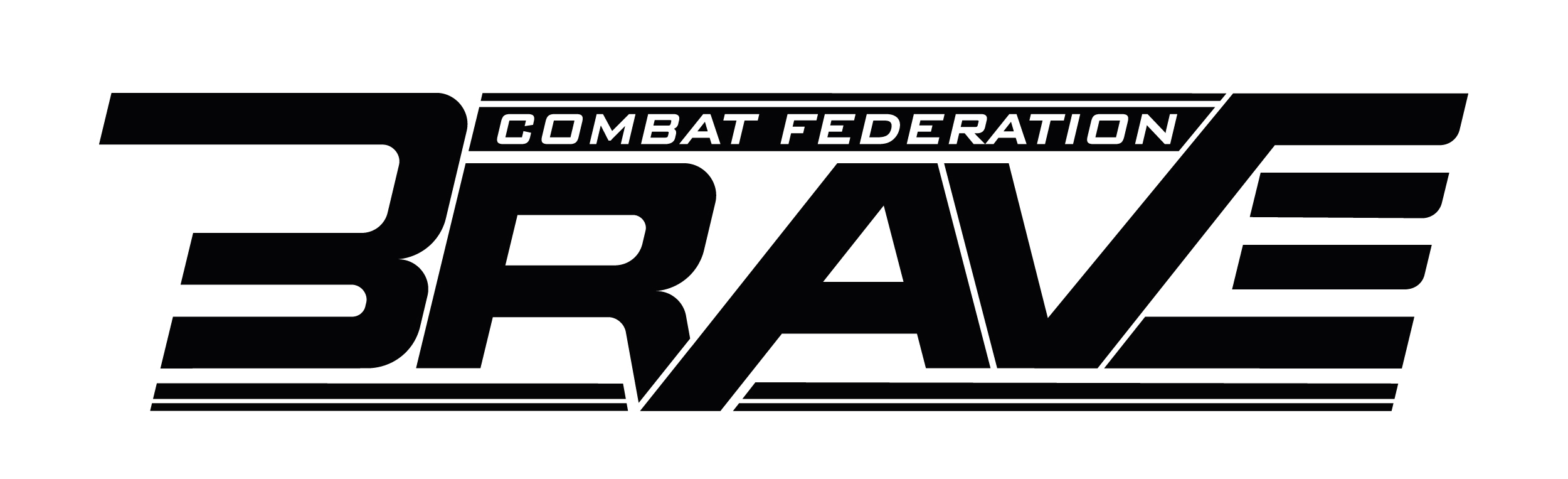

Information
- First date: January 16, 2021
- Last date: December 18, 2021

Events
- Total events: 11

Fights
- Total fights: 122
- Title fights: 4

The year 2021 was the 6th year in the history of the Brave Combat Federation, a mixed martial arts promotion based in Bahrain.

== Brave CF Flyweight Tournament ==
=== Background ===
Brave Combat Federation will look to crown its first Flyweight world champion with an 8-man tournament.

The eight participants of the tournament were revealed. They included the former Bantamweight World Champion Zach Makovsky, the formers UFC fighter Dustin Ortiz, Ali Bagautinov, Jose Torres as well as Abdul Hussein, Flavio de Queiroz, Velimurad Alkhasov and the former Cage Fury Flyweight Champion Sean Santella.

=== BRAVE CF Flyweight Tournament bracket ===
Quarter-finals
(Brazil) Flavio de Queiroz	3r.
(Russia) Velimurad Alkhasov	UD
(Finland) Abdul Hussein	-
(United States) Zach Makovsky	Bye^{1}
(Russia) Ali Bagautinov	UD
(United States) Dustin Ortiz	3r.
(United States) Jose Torres	UD
(Republic of Ireland) Blaine O’Driscoll^{2}	3r.

Semi-finals
(Russia) Velimurad Alkhasov	SD
(United States) Zach Makovsky	3r.
(Russia) Ali Bagautinov	TKO
(United States) Sean Santella ^{3}	1r.

Final
(Russia) Velimurad Alkhasov
(Russia) Ali Bagautinov

^{1}Zach Makovsky got a Quarterfinal bye as Abdul Hussein pulled out due to illness during the weightcut.

^{2}First bout between Torres and Sean Santella ended in a draw at Brave CF 42; Santella was replaced for the rematch by Blaine O’Driscoll due to injury and the bout was held at the Catchweight of 61 kg

^{3}Torres pulled out due to weight cut difficulties and was replaced by Sean Santella

== Brave CF 46: Krepost Selection 10 ==
Brave CF 46: Krepost Selection 10
- Promotion: Brave Combat Federation; Krepost FC
- Date: January 16, 2021
- Venue: WOW Arena
- City: Sochi, Russia

Brave CF 46: Krepost Selection 10 was a mixed martial arts event held by Brave Combat Federation in partnership with Krepost FC on January 16, 2021, at the WOW Arena in Sochi, Russia.

=== Background ===
The event was headlined by a Super Lightweight title bout between the reigning Brave Super Lightweight champion Eldar Eldarov and the former UFC lightweight Leonardo Mafra.

In the co-main event, the one-time UFC Flyweight title challenger Ali Bagautinov was scheduled to fight Oleg Lichkovakha in a 59.5 kg catchweight bout.

=== Results ===
Brave CF 46
Weight Class				Method	Round	Time	Notes
Super Lightweight 75 kg	(Russia) Eldar Eldarov (c)	def.	(Brazil) Leonardo Mafra	TKO (Doctor Stoppage)	1	5:00	For Brave CF Super Lightweight Championship
Catchweight 59.5 kg	(Russia) Ali Bagautinov	def.	(Russia) Oleg Lichkovakha	Decision (Unanimous)	3	5:00	
Catchweight 67 kg	(Russia) Roman Bogatov	def.	(Kazakhstan) Nurzhan Akishev	Decision (Unanimous)	3	5:00	
Heavyweight 120 kg	(Russia) Konstantin Erokhin	def.	(Kyrgyzstan) Zhyrgalbek Chomonov	KO (Punches)	2	0:41	
Catchweight 68 kg	(Russia) Magomed Abdusalamov	-	(Ukraine) Andrey Lezhnev	No Contest (Accidental Clash of Heads)	1	4:30	
Preliminary Card
Lightweight 71 kg	(Kyrgyzstan) Abdysalam Uulu Kubanychbek	def.	(Tajikistan) Jahongir Saidjamolov	Submission (Rear-Naked Choke)	2	2:05	
Super Lightweight 75 kg	(Russia) Khunkar-Pasha Osmaev	def.	(Russia) Yuriy Verenitsen	Decision (Unanimous)	3	5:00	
Catchweight 90 kg	(Bahrain) Murtaza Talha Ali	def.	(Russia) Dmitriy Krivulets	TKO (Punches)	1	1:40	
Lightweight 70 kg	(Russia) Murad Bilarov	def.	(Kazakhstan) Fedor Babich	Submission (Kimura)	2	1:42	
Catchweight 59 kg	(Russia) Magomed Kamalov	def.	(Uzbekistan) Zokirjon Khoshimov	TKO (Punches and Elbows)	2	3:40	
Super Lightweight 75 kg	(Russia) Said Surkhaev	def.	(Kyrgyzstan) Erkinbai Abdusalamov	Submission (Guillotine Choke)	1	3:02	

== Brave CF 47: Asian Domination ==
Brave CF 47: Asian Domination
- Promotion: Brave Combat Federation
- Date: March 11, 2021
- Venue: Arad Fort
- City: Arad, Bahrain

Brave CF 47: Asian Domination was a mixed martial arts event held by Brave Combat Federation on March 11, 2021, at the Arad Fort in Arad, Bahrain.

=== Background ===
A lightweight title eliminator between Rolando Dy and Abdysalam Uulu Kubanychiev was scheduled as the main event of the card.

Two undefeated featherweight prospects were scheduled to fight in the co-main event: Tae Kyun Kim and Husein Kadimagomaev.

Nursulton Ruziboev was set to face off against Andreas Stahl, but the Swede was forced to drop out due to injury. Ibrahim Mane will step up on five days’ notice to take on Ruziboev.

=== Results ===
Brave CF 47
Weight Class				Method	Round	Time	Notes
Lightweight 71 kg	(Kyrgyzstan) Abdysalam Uulu Kubanychbek	def.	(Philippines) Rolando Dy	TKO (Corner Stoppage)	2	5:00	
Featherweight 66 kg	(South Korea) Tae Kyun Kim	def.	(Switzerland) Husein Kadimagomaev	TKO (Punches)	3	2:43	
Welterweight 79.5 kg	(Uzbekistan) Nursulton Ruziboev	def.	(France) Ibrahim Mané	KO (Slam)	1	3:12	
Catchweight 68 kg	(Kyrgyzstan) Nemat Abdrashitov	def.	(Russia) Anzor Abdulkhozhaev	TKO (Punches)	2	2:27	
Featherweight 66 kg	(Afghanistan) Abdul Azim Badakhshi	def.	(Azerbaijan) Agshin Babaev	KO (Punches)	1	4:23	
Flyweight 57 kg	(Kyrgyzstan) Ryskulbek Ibraimov	def.	(Philippines) Jenel Lausa	Decision (Unanimous)	3	5:00	
Bantamweight 61 kg	(India) Mohammad Farhad	def.	(Pakistan) Uloomi Karim	KO (Punch)	2	1:18	
Catchweight 63 kg	(Azerbaijan) Ali Guliev	def.	(India) Rana Rudra	TKO (Referee Stoppage)	1	1:34	
Preliminary Card
Flyweight 57 kg	(Bahrain) Mohammed Zuhair	def.	(Lebanon) Wissam Sandakli	Submission (Rear-Naked Choke)	2	2:43	Amateur Bout
Lightweight 71 kg	(Bahrain) Husain Muhammad	def.	(Lebanon) Raymond Rizk	TKO (Punches)	2	1:11	Amateur Bout

== Brave CF 48: Arabian Night ==
Brave CF 48: Arabian Night
- Promotion: Brave Combat Federation
- Date: March 18, 2021
- Venue: Arad Fort
- City: Arad, Bahrain

Brave CF 48: Arabian Night was a mixed martial arts event held by Brave Combat Federation on March 18, 2021, at the Arad Fort in Arad, Bahrain.

=== Background ===
The event was headlined by a lightweight bout between two promotional newcomers, the PFL veterant Ylies Djiroun has met the former ACA fighter Abdul-Rakhman Makhazhiev.

Tariq Ismail and Nkosi Ndebele were scheduled to fight at bantamweight, but Ismail was forced off the card due to undisclosed reasons. Ndebele instead faced Abdelmoumen Mssaate, who stepped in on short notice for this encounter.

=== Results ===
Brave CF 48
Weight Class				Method	Round	Time	Notes
Lightweight 71 kg	(France) Ylies Djiroun	def.	(Russia) Abdul-Rakhman Makhazhiev	Submission (Guillotine Choke)	3	3:38	
Super Lightweight 75 kg	(Lebanon) Ahmad Labban	def.	(Serbia) Nemanja Kovač	Decision (Unanimous)	3	5:00	
Catchweight 77 kg	(Finland) Olli Santalahti	def.	(Lebanon) Georges Eid	Decision (Split)	3	5:00	
Bantamweight 61 kg	(South Africa) Nkosi Ndebele	def.	(France) Abdelmoumen Mssaate	TKO (Knees)	2	0:46	
Catchweight 88 kg	(Bahrain) Murtaza Talha	def.	(South Africa) Cameron Meintjes	KO (Elbows and Punches)	1	1:51	
Catchweight 58.5 kg	(Kazakhstan) Azat Maksum	def.	(France) Michael Aljarouj	KO (Punches)	3	0:56	
Featherweight 66 kg	(Lebanon) Yousif Ghrairi	def.	(Iraq) Hassan Talal	TKO (Knee)	3	2:53	
Super Lightweight 75 kg	(Pakistan) Abbas Khan	def.	(Egypt) Omar El Dafrawy	Decision (Unanimous)	3	5:00	
Middleweight 84 kg	(Lebanon) Hassan Fakhreddine	def.	(Egypt) Eslam Abdel Menem	TKO (Body Kick and Punches)	1	3:49	
Middleweight 84 kg	(Egypt) Eslam Abdul Baset	def.	(Lebanon) Mohamad Ghorabi	TKO (Punches)	1	2:04	
Catchweight 70 kg	(Iraq) Hussein Salem	def.	(Brazil) Gerson Pereira	TKO (Punches)	2	3:35	
Catchweight 59 kg	(Egypt) Maysara Mohamed	def.	(Iraq) Issa Salem	Decision (Unanimous)	3	5:00	
Featherweight 66 kg	(Bahrain) Abdulla Alyaqoob	def.	(Kurdistan Region) Ramyar Luqman	Decision (Unanimous)	3	5:00	
Lightweight 71 kg	(Iran) Mohsen Mohammadseifi	def.	(Morocco) Bichi Zakaria	TKO (Punches)	1	0:43	

== Brave CF 49: Super Fights ==
Brave CF 49: Super Fights
- Promotion: Brave Combat Federation
- Date: March 25, 2021
- Venue: Arad Fort
- City: Arad, Bahrain

Brave CF 49: Super Fights was a mixed martial arts event scheduled to be held by Brave Combat Federation on March 25, 2021, at the Arad Fort in Arad, Bahrain.

=== Background ===
The event was headlined by a fight between Luan Santiago and Benoît Saint-Denis in a super lightweight bout.

The co-main event featured a rematch between Jose Torres and Sean Santella. The fight is part of the Brave Flyweight Tournament, with their first fight ending in a draw. The week of the event, Santella had to pull out due to injury and was replaced by SBG Ireland's Blaine O’Driscoll. While the fight will be contested at a Catchweight of 61 kg, due to the short-notice nature of the match-up, the bout between Torres and O’Driscoll will indeed serve as a quarter-final fight for the Flyweight tournament.

Two IMMAF flyweight standouts, Muhammad Mokaev and Abdul Hussein, were scheduled to fight at the event.

=== Results ===
Brave CF 49
Weight Class				Method	Round	Time	Notes
Super Lightweight 75 kg	(France) Benoît Saint-Denis	def.	(Brazil) Luan Santiago	Submission (Arm-Triangle Choke)	2	2:52	
Catchweight 61 kg	(United States) Jose Torres	def.	(Republic of Ireland) Blaine O'Driscoll	Decision (Unanimous)	3	5:00	Flyweight Tournament Quarter-Final
Middleweight 84 kg	(Russia) Ikram Aliskerov	def.	(Serbia) Miro Jurković	Submission (Kimura)	2	1:11	
Flyweight 57 kg	(Russia) Muhammad Mokaev	def.	(Finland) Abdul Hussein	Decision (Unanimous)	3	5:00	
Bantamweight 61 kg	(Russia) Gamzat Magomedov	def.	(Latvia) Matiss Zaharovs	Decision (Unanimous)	3	5:00	
Bantamweight 61 kg	(Italy) Francesco Nuzzi	def.	(Albania) Bernardo Sopai	Decision (Split)	3	5:00	
Middleweight 84 kg	(South Africa) Chad Hanekom	def.	(Austria) Dominic Schober	TKO (Leg Kick and Punches)	2	0:18	
Catchweight 77 kg	(Russia) Gadzhimusa Gaziev	def.	(Brazil) Geraldo Coelho	TKO (Pinches)	3	4:25	
Welterweight 79.5 kg	(France) Axel Sola	def.	(Kosovo) Kuitty Begaj	Submission (Arm-Triangle Choke)	1	4:59	
Bantamweight 61 kg	(Jordan) Frieh Harahsheh	def.	(Northern Ireland) Glenn McVeigh	Submission (Guillotine Choke)	1	1:10	
Preliminary Card
Catchweight 77 kg	(Bahrain) Ali Marhoon	def.	(Bahrain) Hamad Mubarak	Submission (Triangle Choke)	2	2:02	Amateur Bout

== Brave CF 50 ==
Brave CF 50
- Promotion: Brave Combat Federation
- Date: April 1, 2021
- Venue: Arad Fort
- City: Arad, Bahrain

Brave CF 50 was a mixed martial arts event held by Brave Combat Federation on April 1, 2021, at the Arad Fort in Arad, Bahrain.

=== Background ===
This event featured a title fight between the champion Jarrah Hussein Al-Silawi and the promotional newcomer Ismail Naurdiev for the Brave Welterweight title as the event headliner.

The co-main event was set to feature a fight for the vacant Brave Light Heavyweight title, between the current Brave Middleweight champion Mohammad Fakhreddine and Mohamed Said Maalem. However, on the day of the event, Fakhreddine had to pull out due to illness, the bout was postponed.

Amin Ayoub was scheduled to make the first defense of his Brave Lightweight title, against the 8-fight Brave veteran Ahmed Amir. However, a week before the event, Amir had to pull out due to injury and was replaced by Mashrabjon Ruziboev, who would fight Ayoub in a 74 kg catchweight non-title fight.

The Brave flyweight tournament has continued with a semi-finals bout who has featured a rematch between Velimurad Alkhasov and Zach Makovsky, and a quarter-final bout between two formers UFC flyweights, Ali Bagautinov and Dustin Ortiz.

=== Results ===
BRAVE CF 50
Weight Class				Method	Round	Time	Notes
Welterweight 79.5 kg	(Jordan) Jarrah Hussein Al-Silawi (c)	def.	(Austria) Ismail Naurdiev	TKO (Leg Kicks)	2	1:19	For Brave CF Welterweight Championship
Flyweight 57 kg	(Russia) Ali Bagautinov	def.	(United States) Dustin Ortiz	Decision (Unanimous)	3	5:00	Flyweight Tournament Quarter-Final
Flyweight 57 kg	(Russia) Velimurad Alkhasov	def.	(United States) Zach Makovsky	Decision (Split)	3	5:00	Flyweight Tournament Semi-Final
Catchweight 74 kg	(France) Amin Ayoub	def.	(Uzbekistan) Mashrabjon Ruziboev	Decision (Unanimous)	3	5:00	
Super Lightweight 75 kg	(Germany) Marcel Grabinski	def.	(Belgium) Issa Isakov	Decision (Unanimous)	3	5:00	
Welterweight 79.5 kg	(Denmark) Louis Glismann	def.	(Switzerland) Kevin Ruart	TKO (Punches)	2	4:57	
Featherweight 66 kg	(Ukraine) Omar Solomonov	def.	(Moldova) Valeriu Mircea	Decision (Unanimous)	3	5:00	
Light Heavyweight 93 kg	(Sweden) Anton Turkalj	def.	(Kazakhstan) Konstantin Soldatov	KO (Punches)	1	0:13	
Bantamweight 61 kg	(Canada) Brad Katona	def.	(Serbia) Borislav Nikolić	Submission (Guillotine Choke)	3	0:40	
Middleweight 84 kg	(Russia) Rustam Chsiev	def.	(South Africa) Brendan Lesar	TKO (Doctor Stoppage)	1	5:00	
Catchweight 77 kg	(England) Carl Booth	def.	(El Salvador) Carlos Belloso	TKO (Leg Kick and Punches)	1	1:12	
Bantamweight 61 kg	(Russia) Alexander Keshtov	def.	(Russia) Bair Shtepin	Decision (Unanimous)	3	5:00	
Featherweight 66 kg	(England) Shoaib Yousaf	def.	(South Africa) Steven Goncalves	Decision (Unanimous)	3	5:00	
Catchweight 73 kg	(Poland) Maciek Gierszewski	def.	(Brazil) Felipe Silva	KO (Punches)	1	2:28	
Lightweight 71 kg	(Russia) Magomed Magomedov	def.	(Luxembourg) Yann Liasse	Decision (Unanimous)	3	5:00	
Featherweight 66 kg	(Northern Ireland) Glenn McVeigh	def.	(Russia) Abdulmanap Magomedov	Decision (Unanimous)	3	5:00	

== Brave CF 51: The Future Is Here ==
Brave CF 51: The Future Is Here
- Promotion: Brave Combat Federation
- Date: June 04, 2021
- Venue: Falcon Club
- City: Minsk, Belarus

Brave CF 51: The Future Is Here was a mixed martial arts event held by Brave Combat Federation on June 4, 2021, at the Falcon Club in Minsk. Belarus will become the 21st country to host a Brave CF show.

=== Background ===
Former UFC fighter Lucas Martins was scheduled to fight Marcel Grabinski in the main event. However, Grabinski has to pull out from the fight due to medical condition. The bout has been called off.

In the co-main event Denis Maher was scheduled to fight Giannis Bachar in a welterweight bout, but Bachar has been forced to withdraw due to an injury. Fernando Gonzalez has stepped in as a replacement. Unfortunately, Gonzalez has been forced to pull due to an undisclosed injury. Maher instead faced Rinat Sagyntay, who stepped in on 3 weeks notice for this encounter.

Frenchmen Ylies Djiroun fought the brit Sam Patterson in lightweight bout. One-time UFC fighter Roman Bogatov fought Abdulmutalip Gairbekov in a featherweight bout.

=== Results ===
Brave CF 51
Weight Class				Method	Round	Time	Notes
Welterweight 79.5 kg	(Belarus) Denis Maher	def.	(Kazakhstan) Rinat Sagyntay	TKO (Punches)	1	2:54	
Lightweight 71 kg	(England) Sam Patterson	def.	(France) Ylies Djiroun	Decision (Unanimous)	3	5:00	
Welterweight 79.5 kg	(Belarus) Vadim Kutsyi	def.	(Kyrgyzstan) Daniyar Abdibaev	Decision (Unanimous)	3	5:00	
Featherweight 66 kg	(Russia) Roman Bogatov	def.	(Russia) Abdulmutalip Gairbekov	Decision (Unanimous)	3	5:00	
Catchweight 59 kg	(Russia) Muhammad Mokaev	-	(Georgia (country)) Ibragim Navruzov	No Contest (Accidental Groin Kick)	1	2:34	
Bantamweight 61 kg	(France) Yanis Ghemmouri	def.	(Belarus) Vladislav Novitskiy	Decision (Split)	3	5:00	
Flyweight 57 kg	(Russia) Badmatsyren Dorzhiev	def.	(Kyrgyzstan) Almanbet Abdyvasy Uulu	Decision (Unanimous)	3	5:00	
Bantamweight 61 kg	(Afghanistan) Abdul Karim Badakhshi	def.	(Russia) Aydemir Kazbekov	Technical Submission (Triangle Choke)	1	4:08	
W.Strawweight 52 kg	(Russia) Anastasia Feofanova	def.	(Turkey) Sevde Turk	Submission (Inverted Triangle Choke)	1	4:23	
Light Heavyweight 93 kg	(Belarus) Vadim Rolich	def.	(Tajikistan) Kurbonsho Jamolov	KO (Spinning Back Kick and Punches)	3	4:35	
Catchweight 62.5 kg	(Tajikistan) Bakhtovar Yunusov	def.	(Belarus) Artem Lukyanov	TKO (Punches)	2	3:08	

== Brave CF 52: Bad Blood ==
Brave CF 52: Bad Blood
- Promotion: Brave Combat Federation
- Date: August 1, 2021
- City: Milan, Italy

Brave CF 52: Bad Blood was a mixed martial arts event held by Brave Combat Federation in partnership with The Golden Cage promotion on August 1, 2021, in Milan, Italy. Italy will become the 22nd country to host a Brave CF show.

=== Background ===
Brave middleweight champion Mohammad Fakhreddine faced Mohamed Said Maalem for the vacant BRAVE Light Heavyweight title. The two of them were scheduled to fight at Brave CF 50, before Fakhreddine withdrew due to illness. Mohamed Said Maalem was strip of the title by FIGMMA for intentional punches opponent's back of the head.

Two additions to the card were announced on July 1: A middleweight bout between Enrico Cortese and the 2015 ADCC bronze medalist Rustam Chsiev, as well as a featherweight bout between the former featherweight champion Elias Boudegzdame and the promotional newcomer Declan Dalton.

The five-fight Brave veteran Gamzat Magomedov is scheduled to meet the undefeated Mochamed Machaev in a bantamweight bout.

Promotional newcomer Olli Santalahti was scheduled to fight the three-fight Brave veteran Kevin Ruart in a super-welterweight bout.

Abdoul Abdouraguimov was scheduled to face Nursulton Ruziboev in an 81 kg catchweight bout.

A featherweight bout between Husein Kadimagomaev and Agshin Babaev was announced for the event, after both fighters had called each other out though social media.

=== Results ===
Brave CF 52
Weight Class				Method	Round	Time	Notes
Light Heavyweight 93 kg	(Algeria) Mohamed Said Maalem	-	(Lebanon) Mohammad Fakhreddine	No Contest (Punches to the Back of the Head)	1	4:20	For the vacant Brave Light Heavyweight title
Middleweight 84 kg	(Russia) Rustam Chsiev	def.	(Italy) Enrico Cortese	TKO (Corner Stoppage Injury)	1	5:00	
Lightweight 70 kg	(Moldova) Valeriu Mircea	def.	(Austria) Ayub Gaziev	KO (Punch)	1	0:43	
Bantamweight 61 kg	(Russia) Gamzat Magomedov	def.	(Austria) Mochamed Machaev	KO (Punches)	1	0:54	
Super Lightweight 75 kg	(France) Benoît Saint-Denis	def.	(Spain) Arkaitz Ramos	Submission (Arm-Triangle Choke)	1	3:09	
Featherweight 66 kg	(Algeria) Elias Boudegzdame	def.	(France) Brice Picaud	Submission (Triangle Choke)	1	1:31	
Super Lightweight 75 kg	(Lebanon) Ahmed Labban	def.	(Moldova) Virgiliu Frasineac	TKO (Knees and Punches)	2	1:09	

== Brave CF 53 ==
Brave CF 53
- Promotion: Brave Combat Federation
- Date: August 21, 2021
- City: Almaty, Kazakhstan

Brave CF 53 was a mixed martial arts event held by Brave Combat Federation in partnership with the Octagon League promotion on August 21, 2021, in Almaty, Kazakhstan.

=== Background ===
A lightweight bout between Lucas Martins and Marcel Grabinski was announced for the event. The two were originally scheduled to fight at Brave CF 51, before Grabinski withdrew from the bout due to health issues. According to Brave CF officials, Grabinski was forced to withdraw from the rescheduled bout a little bit less than week prior to the event due to COVID-19 protocols. Marcel hasn't traveled to Kazakhstan and will be replaced by local standout Olzhas Eskaraev.

A bantamweight bout between UFC veteran Brad Katona and Bair Shtepin was scheduled as the co-main event.

Nurzhan Akishev was scheduled to face the undefeated Tae Kyun Kim in a featherweight bout.

=== Results ===
Brave CF 53
Weight Class				Method	Round	Time	Notes
Featherweight 66 kg	(South Korea) Tae Kyun Kim	def.	(Kazakhstan) Nurzhan Akishev	Decision (Unanimous)	3	5:00	
Catchweight 73 kg	(Kazakhstan) Vasiliy Takhtay	def.	(Brazil) Roger Sampaio	Submission (Rear-Naked Choke)	2	1:24	
Flyweight 57 kg	(Kazakhstan) Asu Almabayev	def.	(Ukraine) Aleksander Doskalchuk	Submission (Rear-Naked Choke)	2	3:47	
Catchweight 74 kg	(Kazakhstan) Olzhas Eskaraev	def.	(Brazil) Lucas Martins	Submission (Rear-Naked Choke)	2	2:49	
Bantamweight 61 kg	(Canada) Brad Katona	def.	(Russia) Bair Shtepin	Decision (Unanimous)	3	5:00	
Flyweight 57 kg	(Kazakhstan) Azat Maksum	def.	(Brazil) Flavio de Queiroz	KO (Punch)	1	3:00	
Catchweight 68 kg	(Russia) Akhmed Magomedov	def.	(Kazakhstan) Ilyar Askhanov	Decision (Unanimous)	3	5:00	
Octagon Preliminary Card
Catchweight 59 kg	(Kazakhstan) Damir Tolenov	def.	(Kyrgyzstan) Nurbek Bolotbekov	Technical Submission (Americana)	1	3:25	
Flyweight 57 kg	(Kazakhstan) Aktore Batyrbek	def.	(Kyrgyzstan) Ernis Abdilakim Uulu	Submission (Triangle Choke)	1	1:02	
Light Heavyweight 93 kg	(Kazakhstan) Karim Ruzbakiev	def.	(Uzbekistan) Khodirkhon Ganiev	Decision (Unanimous)	3	5:00	
Welterweight 79.5 kg	(Kazakhstan) Bauyrzhan Kuanyshbayev	def.	(Uzbekistan) Fakhriddin Mardiev	TKO (Corner Stoppage)	2	5:00	
Catchweight 59 kg	(Kazakhstan) Alisher Gabdullin	def.	(Kyrgyzstan) Bekzat Saparov	Decision (Unanimous)	3	5:00	
Heavyweight 120 kg	(Uzbekistan) Zhasur Mirzamukhamedov	def.	(Kyrgyzstan) Islambek Baktybek Uulu	Decision (Unanimous)	3	5:00	
Super Lightweight 75 kg	(Kyrgyzstan) Maksat Zholdosh	def.	(Uzbekistan) Sanjarbek Erkinov	Submission (Triangle Choke)	2	2:44	

== Brave CF 54 ==
Brave CF 54
- Promotion: Brave Combat Federation
- Date: September 25, 2021
- City: Konin, Poland

Brave CF 54 was a mixed martial arts event held by Brave Combat Federation in partnership with Galana Group on September 25, 2021, in Konin, Poland. Poland will become the 23rd country to host a Brave CF show.

=== Background ===
A Brave Lightweight Championships title bout between the reigning champion Amin Ayoub and challenger Ahmed Amir was scheduled as the event headliner.

A super lightweight bout between Marcel Grabinski and Mihail Kotruţă was scheduled as the co-main event.

=== Results ===
Brave CF 54
Weight Class				Method	Round	Time	Notes
Lightweight 70 kg	(Egypt) Ahmed Amir	def.	(France) Amin Ayoub (c)	Decision (Unanimous)	5	5:00	For the Brave Lightweight title
Catchweight 59 kg	(England) Muhammad Mokaev	def.	(Republic of Ireland) Blaine O'Driscoll	Submission (Rear-Naked Choke)	2	1:36	
Welterweight 79.5 kg	(Poland) Marcin Bandel	def.	(Switzerland) Magomed Ayskhanov	Submission (Rear-Naked Choke)	1	1:38	
Super Lightweight 75 kg	(Germany) Marcel Grabinski	def.	(Moldova) Mihail Kotruţă	TKO (Knees and Punches)	1	4:57	
Welterweight 79.5 kg	(Austria) Ismail Naurdiev	def.	(Finland) Olli Santalahti	Decision (Unanimous)	3	5:00	
W.Strawweight 52 kg	(Poland) Ewelina Woźniak	def.	(Italy) Samin Kamal Beik	TKO (Knee and Punches)	2	0:30	
Featherweight 66 kg	(Ukraine) Omar Solomonov	def.	(Brazil) Rafael Hudson	Submission (Arm-Triangle Choke)	2	2:12	
Welterweight 79.5 kg	(France) Axel Sola	def.	(Poland) Wawrzyniec Bartnik	Decision (Unanimous)	3	5:00	
Bantamweight 61 kg	(Sweden) Bilal Tipsaev	-	(Northern Ireland) Glenn McVeigh	Draw (Unanimous)	3	5:00	

== Brave CF 55 ==
Brave CF 55
- Promotion: Brave Combat Federation
- Date: November 6, 2021
- City: Rostov-on-Don, Russia

Brave CF 55 was a mixed martial arts event held by Brave Combat Federation in partnership with Pro FC on November 6, 2021, in Rostov-on-Don, Russia.

=== Background ===
A Brave flyweight tournament semifinal bout between Ali Bagautinov and José Torres was announced for the event. However, due to difficulties making weight, Torres pulled out and was replaced by Sean Santella.

=== Results ===
Brave CF 55
Weight Class				Method	Round	Time	Notes
Flyweight 57 kg	(Russia) Ali Bagautinov	def.	(United States) Sean Santella	TKO (Punches)	1	1:01	Flyweight Tournament Semi-Final
Welterweight 79.5 kg	(Russia) Artur Sviridov	vs.	(France) Ibrahim Mané	Draw (Unanimous)	3	5:00	
Lightweight 70 kg	(England) Sam Patterson	def.	(Russia) Kamil Magomedov	Submission (Guillotine Choke)	2	3:21	
Middleweight 84 kg	(Russia) Abusupyan Alikhanov	def.	(Russia) Rustam Chsiev	Decision (Majority)	3	5:00	
Welterweight 77 kg	(Russia) Sergey Yaskovec	def.	(Russia) Andrey Bragovskiy	TKO (Punches)	2	4:53	
Welterweight 79.5 kg	(Russia) Kamal Magomedov	def.	(Russia) Vitaly Tverdokhlebov	Submission (Armbar)	1	0:52	
Catchweight 72.5 kg	(Russia) Ali Abdulkhalikov	def.	(Russia) Artur Aliev	Decision (Unanimous)	3	5:00	
Middleweight 84 kg	(Russia) Gadzhimurad Magomedov	def.	(Russia) Djabrail Aidamirov	KO (Punches)	1	0:46	
Featherweight 66 kg	(Russia) Albert Mallakurbanov	def.	(Russia) Islam Omarov	Decision (Unanimous)	3	5:00	
Bantamweight 61 kg	(Russia) Vadim Pavlikov	def.	(Russia) Alan Balaev	Submission (Rear-Naked Choke)	3	3:56	

== Brave CF 56 ==
Brave CF 56
- Promotion: Brave Combat Federation
- Date: December 18, 2021
- City: Belgrade, Serbia

Brave CF 56 was a mixed martial arts event held by Brave Combat Federation in partnership with MMA League of Serbia on December 18, 2021, in Belgrade, Serbia. Serbia will become the 24th country to host a Brave CF show.

=== Background ===
A middleweight bout between Chad Hanekom and Miro Jurković was slated to serve as the event co-headliner. However, on December 12, Hanekom have to withdraw for this event due to travel restrictions. Mikhail Allakhverdian step in on short notice to face Jurković in the co-main event.

=== Results ===
Brave CF 56
Weight Class				Method	Round	Time	Notes
Lightweight 70 kg	(Serbia) Slobodan Maksimović	def.	(Philippines) Rolando Dy	Decision (Unanimous)	3	5:00	
Middleweight 84 kg	(Armenia) Mikhail Allakhverdian	def.	(Serbia) Miro Jurković	Decision (Unanimous)	3	5:00	
Super Lightweight 75 kg	(Lebanon) Ahmed Labban	def.	(Serbia) Nemanja Kovac	Submission (Ninja Choke)	2	1:32	
Bantamweight 61 kg	(Serbia) Borislav Nikolić	def.	(Latvia) Matiss Zaharovs	Decision (Unanimous)	3	5:00	
Light Heavyweight 93 kg	(Slovenia) Jakob Nedoh	def.	(Croatia) Zvonimir Kralj	KO (Punches)	1	0:50	
Welterweight 79.5 kg	(Serbia) Jovan Marjanovic	def.	(Poland) Tomek Łangowski	TKO (Punches)	1	1:31	
Featherweight 66 kg	(Saudi Arabia) Abdullah Al-Qahtani	def.	(Slovenia) Nejc Preložnik	TKO (Body Kick and Punches)	3	1:03	
Welterweight 77 kg	(Bulgaria) Nikolay Nikolov	def.	(Serbia) Milos Cvetkovic	Submission (Rear-Naked Choke)	2	2:10	
Bantamweight 61 kg	(Serbia) Miljan Zdravković	def.	(Turkey) Ahmet Şimşek	Decision (Unanimous)	3	5:00	

== See also ==
- List of current Brave CF fighters
- List of current mixed martial arts champions
