= Jose Torres (fighter) =

American mixed martial arts fighter (born 1992)

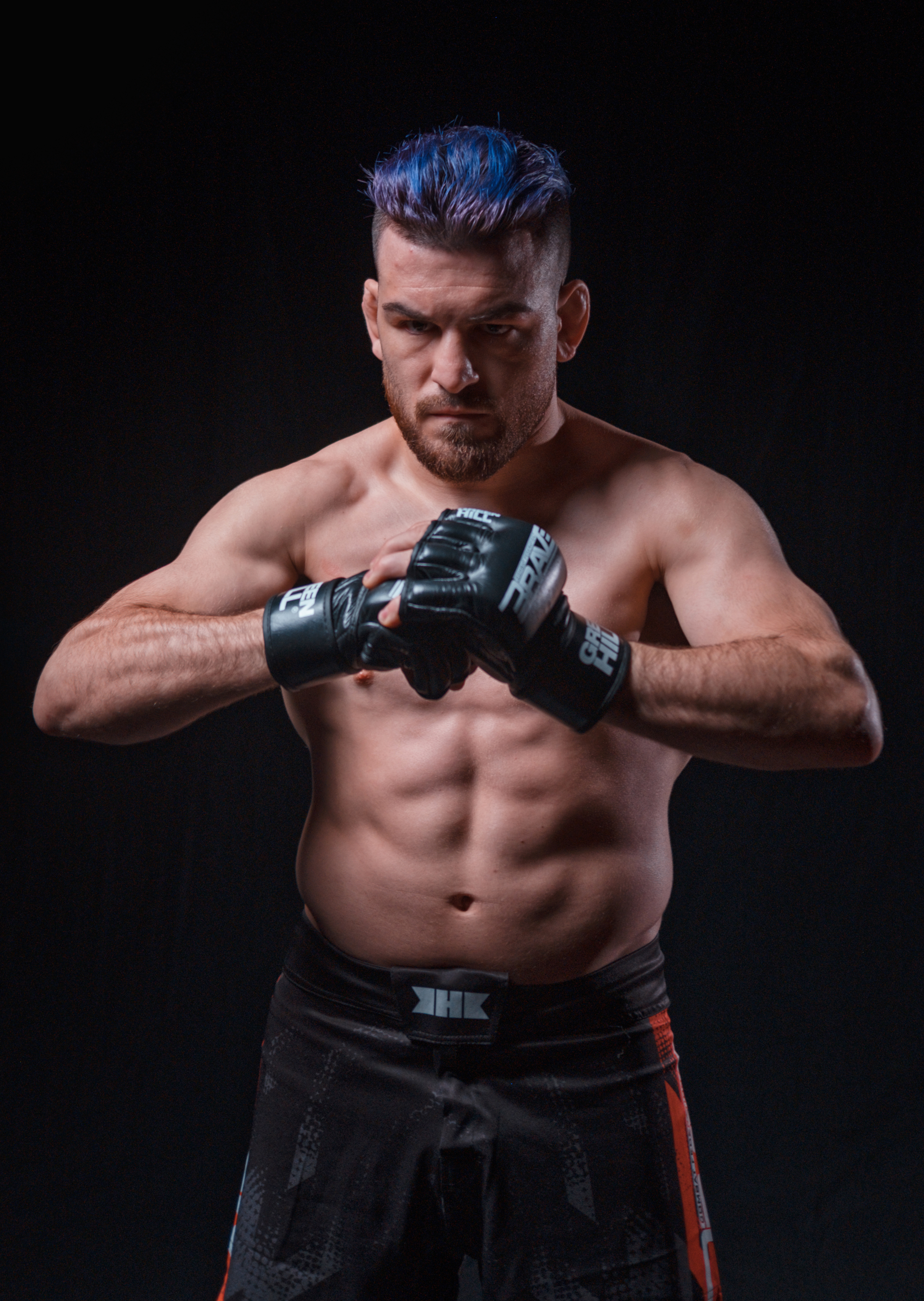
- Born: August 2, 1992 (age 34); Chicago, Illinois, United States
- Other names: Shorty
- Nationality: American
- Height: 5 ft 4 in (1.63 m)
- Weight: 125 lb (57 kg; 8.9 st)
- Division: Bantamweight; Flyweight
- Reach: 66.0 in (168 cm)
- Style: Shotokan
- Fighting out of: Chicago, Illinois
- Team: Combat-Do
- Years active: 2016–present

Mixed martial arts record
- Total: 21
- Wins: 14
- By knockout: 5
- By submission: 2
- By decision: 7
- Losses: 6
- By knockout: 2
- By submission: 0
- By decision: 4
- Draws: 1

Other information
- Mixed martial arts record from Sherdog

Jose Torres (born August 2, 1992) is an American mixed martial artist who competes in the bantamweight division of Rizin Fighting Federation. He is a former Brave CF Bantamweight Champion and the current bantamweight title contender. A professional mixed martial artist since 2016, Torres has also competed in the Titan Fighting Championships and Ultimate Fighting Championship.

== Early life ==
Torres was born in Chicago to parents of Mexican and Puerto Rican descent. He started practicing Shotokan at the age of four. By age 14, Torres joined Combat-Do, with Bob Schirmer as his master.

== Mixed martial arts career ==
=== International Mixed Martial Arts Federation (IMMAF) ===
Torres began his amateur MMA career in 2014, competing until 2015. He went undefeated in 25 bouts. Torres made his International Mixed Martial Arts Federation debut at the inaugural IMMAF World Championships in 2014. Representing the United States of America, Torres holds an amateur MMA record of 25-1 and is a two-time IMMAF World Championships gold medalist.

=== Titan Fighting Championships ===
Torres started his professional MMA career in 2016 and fought for the American-based promotion Titan Fighting Championships. In his Titan FC debut, he fought Travis Taylor on March 4, 2016, at Titan FC 37. Torres won the bout via submission.

Torres then faced Reynaldo Duarte on April 30, at Titan FC 38. He won the bout via unanimous decision.

Torres faced Abdiel Velazquez for the vacant Titan FC Flyweight Championship on August 5, at Titan FC 40. He won the bout by knockout in the second round to win the title.

In his first flyweight title defense, Torres faced Pedro Nobre at Titan FC 43, on January 21, 2017. He won the bout by technical knockout in the third round.

Torres faced Farkhad Sharipov for the Titan FC Bantamweight Championship at Titan FC 44, on May 19. He won the bout via unanimous decision to win the title, becoming the promotion's first double champion in the process.

In his bantamweight title defense, Torres faced Gleidson DeJesus at Titan FC 46, on November 17. He won the bout via technical submission.

In his second and last flyweight title defense, Torres faced Alberto Orellano at Titan FC 48, on February 16, 2018. He won the bout by knockout in the first round.

=== Ultimate Fighting Championship ===
Torres made his UFC debut, replacing Hector Sandoval against Jarred Brooks on June 1, 2018, at UFC Fight Night: Rivera vs. Moraes. He won the fight in round two after Brooks attempted to slam Torres, but Brooks had accidentally knocked himself out in the process.

Torres faced Alex Perez on August 9, 2018, at UFC 227. He lost the bout via knockout in round one. Torres would be released from his UFC contract on November 7.

=== BRAVE CF ===
After his release from the UFC, Torres signed with Brave Combat Federation. In his first fight there, he faced Amir Albazi at BRAVE CF 23 on April 19, 2019. Torres won the bout via unanimous decision.

Torres was scheduled to face Sean Santella for the Flyweight Tournament Quarter-Final at Brave CF 42 on September 24, 2020. The match ended in a majority draw.

Torres was scheduled to Santella at Brave FC 49 on March 25, 2021. The fight was part of the Brave Flyweight Tournament, with their first fight ending in a draw. The week of the event, however, Santella had to pull out due to injury and was replaced by SBG Ireland's Blaine O’Driscoll. While the fight was contested at a Catchweight of 61 kg, due to the short-notice nature of the match-up, the bout between Torres and O’Driscoll indeed served as a quarter-final fight for the Flyweight tournament. Torres won the bout via unanimous decision.

Torres was scheduled to face Ali Bagautinov in the semi-final of the Flyweight tournament at Brave CF 55 on November 6, 2021. Due to difficulties making weight, however, he pulled out and was replaced by Sean Santella.

Moving to bantamweight, Torres was scheduled to face Izzeddine Al Derbani on October 28, 2022, at Brave CF 65. He won the bout via unanimous decision.

Torres faced Nkosi Ndebele for the vacant BRAVE CF Bantamweight Championship on August 12, 2023, at Brave CF 73. He won the bout via split decision to win the vacant title.

Torres faced Ndebele in a rematch for the Brave CF bantamweight title on December 15, 2023, at Brave CF 80. He lost the bout by third-round TKO via retirement.

The two rivals faced each other again in the first-ever trilogy in BRAVE Combat Federation history in the main event of Brave CF 82 in Mauritius on 11 May 2024. He lost the bout again, this time via unanimous decision.

== Championships and accomplishments ==
=== Mixed martial arts ===
- Brave Combat Federation
  - Brave CF Bantamweight Championship (One time)
- Titan Fighting Championships
  - Titan FC Bantamweight Championship (One time)
  - Titan FC Flyweight Championship (One time)
- Fight Matrix
  - 2016 Male Rookie of the Year

== Mixed martial arts record ==
Professional record breakdown
21 matches	14 wins	6 losses
By knockout	5	2
By submission	2	0
By decision	7	4
Draws	1	

Res.	Record	Opponent	Method	Event	Date	Round	Time	Location	Notes
Win	14–6–1	Wagner Noronha	TKO (punches)	Gamebred Bareknuckle MMA 12	October 2, 2026	2	4:37	Santo Domingo, Dominican Republic	
Loss	13–6–1	Joji Goto	Decision (split)	Rizin: Shiwasu no Cho Tsuwamono Matsuri	December 31, 2025	3	5:00	Saitama, Japan	Return to Bantamweight.
Loss	13–5–1	Hiromasa Ougikubo	Decision (unanimous)	Super Rizin 4	July 27, 2025	3	5:00	Saitama, Japan	2025 Rizin Flyweight Grand Prix Quarterfinal.
Loss	13–4–1	Dias Yerengaipov	Decision (unanimous)	Brave CF 95	May 30, 2025	3	5:00	Tenerife, Spain	Return to Flyweight.
Win	13–3–1	Makoto Takahashi	Decision (split)	Rizin 49	December 31, 2024	3	5:00	Saitama, Japan	Catchweight (130 lb) bout.
Loss	12–3–1	Nkosi Ndebele	Decision (unanimous)	Brave CF 82	May 11, 2024	5	5:00	Saint Pierre, Mauritius	For the Brave CF Bantamweight Championship.
Loss	12–2–1	Nkosi Ndebele	TKO (retirement)	Brave CF 80	December 15, 2023	3	1:38	Isa Town, Bahrain	Lost the Brave CF Bantamweight Championship.
Win	12–1–1	Nkosi Ndebele	Decision (split)	Brave CF 73	August 12, 2023	5	5:00	Bogotá, Colombia	Won the vacant Brave CF Bantamweight Championship.
Win	11–1–1	Izzeddine Al Derbani	Decision (unanimous)	Brave CF 65	October 28, 2022	5	5:00	Isa Town, Bahrain	Return to Bantamweight.
Win	10–1–1	Blaine O'Driscoll	Decision (unanimous)	Brave CF 49	March 25, 2021	3	5:00	Arad, Bahrain	Brave CF Flyweight Tournament Quarterfinal.
Draw	9–1–1	Sean Santella	Draw (majority)	Brave CF 42	September 24, 2020	3	5:00	Riffa, Bahrain	Brave CF Flyweight Tournament Quarterfinal.
Win	9–1	Amir Albazi	Decision (unanimous)	Brave CF 23	April 19, 2019	3	5:00	Amman, Jordan	
Loss	8–1	Alex Perez	KO (punches)	UFC 227	August 9, 2018	1	3:34	Los Angeles, California, United States	
Win	8–0	Jarred Brooks	KO (slam)	UFC Fight Night: Rivera vs. Moraes	June 1, 2018	2	2:55	Utica, New York, United States	Brooks knocked himself out attempting to slam Torres.
Win	7–0	Alberto Orellano	KO (punch)	Titan FC 48	February 16, 2018	1	3:52	Coral Gables, Florida, United States	Defended the Titan FC Flyweight Championship.
Win	6–0	Gleidson DeJesus	Technical Submission (rear-naked choke)	Titan FC 46	November 17, 2017	4	4:13	Pembroke Pines, Florida, United States	Defended the Titan FC Bantamweight Championship.
Win	5–0	Farkhad Sharipov	Decision (unanimous)	Titan FC 44	May 19, 2017	5	5:00	Pembroke Pines, Florida, United States	Won the Titan FC Bantamweight Championship.
Win	4–0	Pedro Nobre	TKO (punches)	Titan FC 43	January 21, 2017	3	3:14	Coral Gables, Florida, United States	Defended the Titan FC Flyweight Championship.
Win	3–0	Abdiel Velazquez	KO (punch and knee)	Titan FC 40	August 5, 2016	2	3:52	Coral Gables, Florida, United States	Flyweight debut. Won the Titan FC Flyweight Championship.
Win	2–0	Reynaldo Duarte	Decision (unanimous)	Titan FC 38	April 30, 2016	3	5:00	Miami, Florida, United States	
Win	1–0	Travis Taylor	Submission (guillotine choke)	Titan FC 37	March 4, 2016	1	2:09	Ridgefield, Washington, United States	Bantamweight debut.

== See also ==
- List of current Rizin Fighting Federation fighters
- List of male mixed martial artists
