= Namiki Kawahara =

Japanese mixed martial artist

- Born: July 17, 1989 (age 37); Osaka, Japan
- Native name: 川原波輝
- Nationality: Japanese
- Height: 5 ft 7 in (1.70 m)
- Weight: 125 lb (57 kg; 8 st 13 lb)
- Division: Strawweight (2015-2020); Flyweight (2021–present)
- Stance: Orthodox
- Fighting out of: Sacramento, California, United States
- Team: Team Alpha Male
- Years active: 2015 - present

Mixed martial arts record
- Total: 20
- Wins: 9
- By knockout: 4
- By submission: 2
- By decision: 3
- Losses: 9
- By knockout: 2
- By submission: 1
- By decision: 6
- Draws: 1
- No contests: 1

Other information
- Mixed martial arts record from Sherdog

Namiki Kawahara (Japanese: 川原波輝, born 17 July 1989) is a Japanese mixed martial artist who competed in the Strawweight division of ONE Championship. He is the former DEEP Strawweight champion.

== Mixed martial arts career ==
=== Early career ===
Kawahara made his professional debut at Pancrase Osaka on July 26, 2015, against Tsukasa Zenji. The fight ended in a draw, as neither fighter achieved a stoppage inside the time limit. He won his next fight against Tatsuki Ozaki, which was likewise contested under the Pancrase banner, by unanimous decision.

He moved briefly to DEEP, where he made his promotional debut against Icho Tomonaga at DEEP Osaka Impact 2016. He won the fight by TKO, after just 16 seconds. He next fought Magisa at DEEP Cage Impact 2016 in Osaka, and won the fight by an armbar in the second round.

Returning to Pancrase, Kawahara suffered his first professional loss to Takuya Goto, by split decision.

He rebounded from this loss with a first-round TKO of Noriyuki Takei at DEEP Osaka Impact. He was then scheduled to fight Yutaro Muramoto at DEEP Cage Impact 2017, whom he beat by a second-round TKO.

His next fight was against Yuya Kodama at DEEP 80. The fight ended in a no-contest, as Kawahara landed an accidental low blow which rendered Kodama unable to continue. His next fight against Yutaro Muramoto, at DEEP 85, ended in a majority draw.

Following this four-fight unbeaten streak, Kawahara was scheduled to fight Haruo Ochi at DEEP 88 for the DEEP Strawweight title. Ochi won the fight by unanimous decision.

After his failed title bid, Kawahara was scheduled to make his RIZIN debut at Rizin 16 - Kobe, when he was scheduled to fight Takaki Soya. Soya won the fight by a first-round TKO.

=== DEEP title reign ===
Kawahara was scheduled to fight Jun Nakamura in a Pancrase and DEEP cross-promotional event, in a DEEP Strawweight title eliminator. Kawahara won the fight by a first-round TKO. After beating Nakamura, Kawahara was scheduled to once again challenge for the DEEP Strawweight title, in a rematch with Haruo Ochi. He beat Ochi by a second-round submission, locking in a rear-naked choke in the dying seconds of the second round. It was the highest profile victory of Kawahara's career up to that point.

Following his win against Haruo Ochi, and prior to signing with ONE Championship, Fight Matrix ranked him as the second best strawweight in the world.

=== ONE Championship ===
Kawahara then made his ONE Championship debut at ONE Championship: Unbreakable, being scheduled to fight Lito Adiwang as a late notice replacement for Hexigetu. Adiwang won the fight by a second-round TKO.

Kawahara was booked to face Danial Williams at ONE 156 on April 22, 2022. He lost the fight by unanimous decision.

== Championships and accomplishments ==
- Urijah Faber's A-1 Combat
  - Strawweight Champion (One time, current)
- Cage Warriors Southeast
  - CWSE Strawweight Champion (One time, current)
- DEEP
  - DEEP Strawweight championship (One time, former)
- eFight.jp
  - August 2020 Fighter of the Month

== Mixed martial arts record ==
Professional record breakdown
20 matches	9 wins	9 losses
By knockout	4	2
By submission	2	1
By decision	3	6
Draws	1	
No contests	1	

Res.	Record	Opponent	Method	Event	Date	Round	Time	Location	Notes
Loss	9–9–1 (1)	An Tuan Ho	Decision (unanimous)	Urijah Faber's A1 Combat 36	June 27, 2026	3	5:00	Wheatland, California, United States	
Loss	9–8–1 (1)	Phumi Nkuta	Decision (unanimous)	Urijah Faber's A1 Combat 34	March 27, 2026	3	5:00	Wheatland, California, United States	For the vacant A1 Combat Flyweight Championship.
Loss	9–7–1 (1)	Elias Garcia	Decision (split)	Urijah Faber's A1 Combat 31	October 10, 2025	3	5:00	Long Beach, California, United States	Return to Flyweight.
Win	9–6–1 (1)	Charlie Falco	Decision (unanimous)	Cage Warriors Academy South East 36	October 5, 2024	3	5:00	Colchester, England	Won the CWSE Strawweight Championship.
Loss	8–6–1 (1)	Haruo Ochi	Submission (guillotine choke)	DEEP Tokyo Impact 2024 3rd Round	May 26, 2024	1	1:59	Tokyo, Japan	Lost the DEEP Strawweight championship.
Win	8–5–1 (1)	Anthony Do	Decision (unanimous)	Urijah Faber's A1 Combat 19	March 29, 2024	3	5:00	Wheatland, California, United States	Return to Strawweight. Won the vacant A1C Strawweight Championship.
Loss	7–5–1 (1)	Danial Williams	Decision (unanimous)	ONE 156	April 22, 2022	3	5:00	Kallang, Singapore	
Loss	7–4–1 (1)	Lito Adiwang	KO (punch)	ONE: Unbreakable	January 22, 2021	2	2:02	Kallang, Singapore	Flyweight debut.
Win	7–3–1 (1)	Haruo Ochi	Submission (rear-naked choke)	Deep 96 Impact	23 August 2020	2	4:43	Tokyo, Japan	Won the DEEP Strawweight championship.
Win	6–3–1 (1)	Jun Nakamura	KO (punch)	Deep & Pancrase: Osaka Tournament	November 17, 2019	1	1:54	Tokyo, Japan	
Loss	5–3–1 (1)	Takaki Soya	KO (punch)	Rizin 16 - Kobe	June 2, 2019	1	4:02	Kobe, Japan	
Loss	5–2–1 (1)	Haruo Ochi	Decision (unanimous)	Deep 88 Impact	March 9, 2019	3	5:00	Tokyo, Japan	For the DEEP Strawweight championship.
Draw	5–1–1 (1)	Yutaro Muramoto	Draw (majority)	Deep 85 Impact	August 26, 2018	3	5:00	Tokyo, Japan	
NC	5–1 (1)	Yuya Kodama	NC (accidental groin kick)	Deep 80 Impact	October 21, 2017	1	4:06	Tokyo, Japan	Accidental groin kick rendered Kodama unable to continue.
Win	5–1	Yutaro Muramoto	KO (knee and punches)	Deep: Cage Impact 2017 in Korakuen Hall	July 15, 2017	2	1:42	Tokyo, Japan	
Win	4–1	Noriyuki Takei	TKO (punches)	Deep Osaka Impact 2017	March 20, 2017	1	4:24	Osaka, Japan	
Loss	3–1	Takuya Goto	Decision (split)	Pancrase Osaka	December 11, 2016	3	3:00	Osaka, Japan	
Win	3–0	Magisa Magisa	Submission (armbar)	Deep: Cage Impact 2016 in Osaka	October 9, 2016	2	1:25	Osaka, Japan	
Win	2–0	Icho Tomonaga	TKO (punches)	Deep Osaka Impact 2016	March 21, 2016	1	0:16	Osaka, Japan	
Win	1–0	Tatsuki Ozaki	Decision (unanimous)	Pancrase Osaka	December 23, 2015	3	3:00	Osaka, Japan	

=== Amateur mixed martial arts record ===
Amateur record breakdown		
3 matches	3 wins	0 losses
By knockout	3	0

Res.	Record	Opponent	Method	Event	Date	Round	Time	Location	Notes
Win	3–0	Ryoma Uemura	TKO (punches)	JML Kansai 12	17 May 2015	1	1:14	Osaka, Japan	
Win	2–0	Yuki Doi	TKO (referee stoppage)	JML Kansai 11	15 February 2015	1	2:46	Osaka, Japan	
Win	1–0	Naoto Arimura	TKO (referee stoppage)	JML Kansai 11	15 February 2015	1	0:58	Osaka, Japan	

== See also ==
- List of Deep champions
- List of current ONE fighters
