= ONE 156 =

Combat sport events in 2022

ONE 156: Eersel vs. Sadiković
- The poster for ONE 156: Eersel vs. Sadiković
- Promotion: ONE Championship
- Date: April 22, 2022
- Venue: Singapore Indoor Stadium
- City: Kallang, Singapore

Event chronology
ONE X: 10 Years Anniversary	ONE 156: Eersel vs. Sadiković	ONE 157: Petchmorakot vs. Vienot

ONE 156: Eersel vs. Sadiković was a Combat sport event produced by ONE Championship that took place on April 22, 2022, at the Singapore Indoor Stadium in Kallang, Singapore.

== Background ==
The event was headlined by a ONE Lightweight Kickboxing World Championship bout between the reigning champion Regian Eersel and title challenger Arian Sadiković.

The co-main event took place for the inaugural ONE Women's Strawweight Muay Thai World Championship bout between Jackie Buntan and Smilla Sundell.

A strawweight MMA clash between #1-ranked Bokang Masunyane and #2-ranked Jarred Brooks took place at the event.

Former WBC and WMC Muay Thai World Champion Liam Harrison faced "Elbow Zombie" Muangthai PK.Saenchai in a bantamweight muay thai showdown and the strawweight mixed martial arts bout between Namiki Kawahara and Danial Williams took place at the event.

Marcus Almeida returns to action against Oumar Kane. However, Kane withdrew due to Injury.

A Strawweight bout between former ONE Strawweight Champion Yosuke Saruta and Gustavo Balart was expected to take place at ONE: Bad Blood in February, but Saruta withdraw from the bout due to tested positive for COVID-19. The pairing was rebooked for this event.

A kickboxing light heavyweight bout between former SUPERKOMBAT Super Cruiserweight Champion Andrei Stoica and Giannis Stoforidis was scheduled for the event.

A Women's Atomweight Muay Thai bout between Former Glory Women's Super Bantamweight Championship Anissa Meksen and Estonian phenom Marie Ruumet was scheduled for the event.

A Women's Strawweight bout between former Women's Strawweight title Challenger Ayaka Miura and Dayane Cardoso was scheduled for the event.

Mikey Musumeci is to compete against Japanese MMA veteran Masakazu Imanari this particular bout will be a Submission Grappling match.

== Results ==
Main Card (YouTube / Watch ONE)
Weight class				Method	Round	Time	Notes
Lightweight Kickboxing	Regian Eersel (c)	def.	Arian Sadiković	Decision (unanimous)	5	3:00	(Note: For the ONE Lightweight Kickboxing World Championship)
Women's Strawweight Muay Thai	Smilla Sundell	def.	Jackie Buntan	Decision (unanimous)	5	3:00	(Note: For the inaugural ONE Women's Strawweight Muay Thai World Championship)
Catchweight (128 lbs)	Jarred Brooks	def.	Bokang Masunyane	Technical Submission (rear-naked choke)	1	4:39	(Note: ONE Strawweight title eliminator. Masunyane missed weight (128 lbs).)
Bantamweight Muay Thai	Liam Harrison	def.	Muangthai P.K.Saenchai	TKO (three knockdowns)	1	2:19
Bantamweight	Song Min-jong	def.	Chen Rui	Technical Submission (rear-naked choke)	2	4:26
Strawweight	Danial Williams	def.	Namiki Kawahara	Decision (unanimous)	3	5:00
Lead Card (YouTube / Watch ONE)
Strawweight	Gustavo Balart	def.	Yosuke Saruta	Decision (unanimous)	3	5:00
Light Heavyweight Kickboxing	Andrei Stoica	def.	Giannis Stoforidis	Decision (majority)	3	3:00	(Note: Originally announced as a split decision, due to a miscalculation in scores.)
Women's Atomweight Muay Thai	Anissa Meksen	def.	Marie Ruumet	Decision (unanimous)	3	3:00
Flyweight	Windson Ramos	def.	Woo Sung-hoon	Decision (unanimous)	3	5:00
Women's Strawweight	Dayane Souza	def.	Ayaka Miura	TKO (shoulder injury)	2	0:56
Lightweight	Abraao Amorim	def.	Dae Sung-park	TKO (knee and punches)	2	1:20
Welterweight	Jin Tae-ho	def.	Agilan Thani	Submission (kimura)	1	2:26
Catchweight (142 lbs)	Mikey Musumeci	def.	Masakazu Imanari	Submission (rear-naked choke)	1	4:09	(Note: Submission Grappling bout. Awarded 'Performance of the Night'.)
Featherweight	Keanu Subba	def.	James Yang	Decision (unanimous)	3	5:00

== Bonus awards ==
The following fighters were awarded bonuses:

- $50,000 Performance of the Night: Mikey Musumeci, Smilla Sundell and Regian Eersel
- $100,000 Performance of the Night: Liam Harrison

== See also ==
- 2022 in ONE Championship
- List of ONE Championship events
- List of current ONE fighters
