= Hamid Sadid =

Afghan footballer and mixed martial artist

Personal information
- Full name: Hamid Sadid
- Date of birth: 24 May 1989 (age 37)
- Place of birth: Afghanistan
- Height: 1.78 m (5 ft 10 in)
- Position: Midfielder

International career^{‡}
Years	Team	Apps	(Gls)
	Afghanistan	2	(0)
- ‡ National team caps and goals as of 24 May 2017

Hamid Sadid (born 24 May 1989) is a mixed martial artist and a professional Afghan footballer who plays as a midfielder.

== International career ==
In 2014, Sadid was called up for a friendly match between the Afghanistan national football team and Kyrgyzstan. He was not selected for the AFC Challenge Cup 2014.
