= Brave 6: Kazakhstan =

Brave Combat Federation MMA event in 2017

- Promotion: Brave Combat Federation
- Date: April 28th, 2017
- Venue: Almaty Arena
- City: Almaty, Kazakhstan

Event chronology
Brave 5: Go For Glory	Brave 6: Kazakhstan

Brave 6: Kazakhstan (also known as Brave 6 or 'Brave Kazakhstan') was a mixed martial arts event held live by Brave Combat Federation on Saturday April 28, 2017 at the Almaty Arena in Almaty, Kazakhstan. The event was broadcast live online and locally through Bahrain TV, ABS-CBN Sports and Action, Combate, Kazakh TV Claro Sports and OSN Sports.

== Background ==
Brave 6: Kazakhstan was Brave Combat Federation's sixth card, the fourth to take place outside Bahrain, where the company headquarters is located, and the first one in Central Asia. In addition, Brave 6 was the first co-promotion in the event's history, promoted in partnership with the local promotion Qazaq FC.

The event had the first ever Women's MMA fight, between Mariya Agapova and Yulia Litvinceva, in the Flyweight division.

Júlio César "Morceguinho" was supposed to face Bakhtiyar Arzumanov in a main card featured bout but was forced to withdraw after being diagnosed with dengue fever. His opponent Arzumanov was kept on the card, but was also pulled a few days later after having his visa denied while entering Kazakhstan. The bout was then canceled.

Ikram Aliskerov was originally scheduled to face Ireland's Will Fleury in a main card featured bout but Fleury was forced to withdraw due to an injury. Fleury was then replaced by Azerbaijan's Rufat Asadov.

=== Fakhreddine vs Mafra cancellation ===
After debuting with a win at Brave 4: Unstoppable, Lebanon's Mohammad Fakhreddine had a quick turnaround and was scheduled to face The Ultimate Fighter: Brazil season 1 veteran Leonardo Mafra in a welterweight bout.

However, Fakhreddine missed the weight during the official weigh-ins and Mafra failed to reach an agreement to compete against his opponent under these circumstances. Fakhreddine, on the other hand, was kept on the card and took a catchweight fight against Poland's Lukasz Witos in 81 kg.

== Broadcast ==
The event was broadcast internationally online, through Brave's official website and YouTube channel, for free. In addition, the card was also broadcast in Bahrain through Bahrain TV, Middle East through OSN Sports, Kazakhstan through Kazakh TV, Hispanic America through Claro Sports, Brazil through Combate and Asia through ABS-CBN Sports and Action.

=== Broadcasting team ===
- Play-by-play commentator: Cyrus Fees
- Color Commentator: Nate Quarry
- Cage announcer: Carlos Kremer

== Results ==
Main Card (TV)
Weight class				Method	Round	Time	Notes
Lightweight	Eldar Eldarov	def.	Henrique Gomes	TKO (elbows)	1	3:52
Lightweight	Habiti Tuerxunbieke	def.	Orkhan Mamedov	KO (punches)	1	4:51
Catchweight (179 lb)	Mohammad Fakhreddine	def.	Lucasz Witos	TKO (punches)	1	4:24
Bantamweight	Teimur Zhaparov	def.	Amirchan Saidjalolov	Submission (armbar)	2	3:30
Bantamweight	Anatoliy Kondratyev	def.	Zhuman Zhumabekov	Decision (unanimous) (29–28, 29–28, 29–28)	3	5:00
Lightweight	Erik Carlsson	def.	Gadzhimusa Gaziev	KO (knee to the body)	1	3:13
Women's Flyweight	Mariya Agapova	def.	Yulia Litvinceva	TKO (punches)	1	2:15
Middleweight	Ikram Aliskerov	vs.	Rufat Asadov	Submission (guillotine choke)	1	4:00
Featherweight	Igor Zhirkov	def.	Kuanysh Shrynbekov	Submission (arm-triangle choke)	1	4:55
Postliminary card: Amateur bout
Featherweight	Berik Shinalyev	def.	Yerbol Kozhanov	Submission (rear-naked choke)	2	3:19
