= Brave 4: Unstoppable =

Brave Combat Federation MMA event in 2017

- Promotion: Brave Combat Federation
- Date: March 31st, 2017
- Venue: IPIC Arena
- City: Abu Dhabi, UAE

Event chronology
Brave 3: Battle in Brazil	Brave 4: Unstoppable	Brave 5: Go For Glory

Brave 4: Unstoppable (also known as Brave 4) was a mixed martial arts event held live by Brave Combat Federation on Friday March 31, 2017 at the IPIC Arena in Abu Dhabi, United Arab Emirates. The event was broadcast live online and locally through Bahrain TV, ABS-CBN Sports and Action, Combate, Abu Dhabi Sports and OSN Sports.

== Background ==
Brave 4: Unstoppable was Brave Combat Federation's fourth card and the first to be held in the Middle East but outside of Bahrain, where the company headquarters is located. The event was the second international edition of Brave, right after Brave 3: Battle in Brazil.

Brave 4 was headlined by Brave's first ever title fight, between Algeria's Elias Boudegzdame and Mexico's Masio Fullen. Masio was scheduled to be part of Brave's first attempt of a title fight, the canceled bout against Alan Omer at Brave 2: Dynasty, and was kept in the fight. With Omer moving up to the Lightweight division, Elias Boudegzdame filled his spot in the championship fight.

The event also marked the long-awaited debut of Mohammad Fakhreddine under Brave banner, after the Lebanese failed to compete at Brave 1: The Beginning due to an injury. Fakhreddine was set to face Brazil's Vinícius Cruz in the co-main event of the evening.

Abdul Kareem Al-Selwady was supposed to fight Alexandre Rodrigues in a featured Lightweight main card bout. One week before the fight, though, Alexandre was forced to withdraw due to an injury and was replaced by Michael Deiga-Scheck.

== Broadcast ==
The event was broadcast internationally online, through Brave's official website and YouTube channel, for free. In addition, the card was also broadcast in Bahrain through Bahrain TV, Middle East through OSN Sports and Abu Dhabi Sports, Brazil through Combate and Asia through ABS-CBN Sports and Action.

=== Broadcasting team ===
- Play-by-play commentator: Cyrus Fees
- Color Commentator: Alex Soto (former UFC, Titan FC, and Bellator fighter)
- Guest Commentator: Cris Cyborg
- Cage announcer: Carlos Kremer

== Results ==
Main Card
Weight class				Method	Round	Time	Notes
Featherweight	Elias Boudegzdame	def.	Masio Fullen	Submission (triangle choke)	1	3:24	(Note: For the inaugural Brave CF Featherweight Championship.)
Welterweight	Mohammad Fakhreddine	def.	Vinicius Cruz	TKO (doctor stoppage)	2	3:37
Lightweight	Ottman Azaitar	def.	Charlie Leary	TKO (punches)	1	2:22
Strawweight	Jomar Pa-ac	def.	Atif Mohammad Khadim	Decision (split) (29–28, 27–30, 29–28)	3	5:00
Welterweight	Jarrah Al-Silawi	def.	Daniele Scatizzi	Decision (unanimous) (29–28, 29–28, 29–28)	3	5:00
Lightweight	Alan Omer	def.	Robbie Peralta	Submission (rear-naked choke)	3	4:44
Lightweight	Abdul-Kareem Al-Selwady	def.	Michael Deiga-Scheck	TKO (punches)	2	3:55
Preliminary Card
Heavyweight	Fabiano Silva	def.	Ramadan Mohammed	TKO (punches)	1	2:35
Catchweight (163 lb)	Ahmed Amir	def.	Kevin Koldobsky	Technical Submission (rear-naked choke)	2	1:24
Bantamweight	Frans Mlambo	def.	Jalal Al Daaja	Submission (guilotine choke)	3	3:59
Light Heavyweight	Marco Knöbel	def.	Ben Forsyth	Submission (rear-naked choke)	1	1:24
Bantamweight	Rafael Souza Bernardino	def.	Serg Jayson	Decision (unanimous) (30–27, 30–27, 30–27)	3	5:00
Postliminary card (Dark bout)
Light Heavyweight	Klidson Abreu	def.	Artur Guseinov	Submission (rear-naked choke)	1	2:22

== Bonus Awards ==
- Fight of the Night: Ottman Azaitar x Charlie Leary
- Knockout of the Night: Ottman Azaitar
- Submission of the Night: Elias Boudegzdame
