= Brave 3: Battle In Brazil =

Brave Combat Federation MMA event in 2017

Brave 3: Battle in Brazil
- Promotion: Brave Combat Federation
- Date: March 18th, 2017
- Venue: Ginásio Max Rosenmann
- City: Curitiba, Brazil

Event chronology
Brave 2: Dynasty	Brave 3: Battle in Brazil	Brave 4: Unstoppable

Brave 3: Battle in Brazil (also known as Brave 3) was a mixed martial arts event held live by Brave Combat Federation on Saturday March 18, 2017 at the Max Rosenmann Arena in São José dos Pinhais, Curitiba metropolitan area, Brazil. The event was broadcast live online and locally through Bahrain TV, ABS-CBN Sports and Action, Combate and OSN Sports.

== Background ==
Brave 3: Battle in Brazil was Brave Combat Federation's third card and the first to be held outside Bahrain, where the company headquarters is located.

The event was the second international mixed martial arts fight night to take place in the Curitiba Metropolitan Area, after UFC 198 on May 14, 2016, and the first to be held in the municipality of São José dos Pinhais.

The Brazilian card was first announced during Brave 2: Dynasty post-fight press conference in Bahrain. The original date was February 25, 2017, but the event was then rescheduled to March 18, 2017.

Brave 3 was originally supposed to be headlined by the fight between the Brazilian rivals Lucas "Mineiro" Martins and Paulo "Bananada" Gonçalves. The promotion of the main event was very intense, with the opponents trading shots publicly and involved even local celebrities, like MasterChef Brasil judge Henrique Fogaça and Brazilian model and TV host Ana Hickmann.

During the fight week, though, Paulo Bananada suffered a knee injury and was forced to withdraw from the fight . To Paulo's place, Brave promoted Mexico's Fabian Galvan, who was originally scheduled to face Willian Lima on the preliminary card. A new opponent for Willian was cogitated, but the promotion ended up pulling the Brazilian from the card.

Julio César "Morceguinho" was supposed to face Nate Landwehr in a main card featured bout, but Landwehr pulled from the fight due to a last minute injury. For his spot, Brave brought Brazil's Fernando Colman and made the fight a Catchweight bout in 150 lb (68 kg).

Walel Watson was originally scheduled to face the former Bellator fighter Diego Marlon in a Bantamweight bout. Two weeks before the fight, Diego was pulled from the fight and the former Titan FC contender Felipe Efrain took his place against Watson.

India's Pawan Singh was supposed to fight USA's James Pou in a preliminary lightweight bout but both athletes were considered unable to compete as per the Brazilian Athletic Commission medical protocol and the fight was then canceled.

== Broadcast ==
The event was broadcast internationally online, through Brave's official website and YouTube channel, for free. In addition, the card was also broadcast in Bahrain through Bahrain TV, Middle East through OSN Sports, Brazil through Combate and Asia through ABS-CBN Sports and Action.

=== Broadcasting team ===
- Play-by-play commentator: Cyrus Fees
- Color Commentator: Frankie Edgar
- Cage announcer: Carlos Kremer

== Results ==
Main Card
Weight class				Method	Round	Time	Notes
Featherweight	Lucas Martins	def.	Fabian Galvan	Submission (brabo choke)	2	4:42
Welterweight	Carlston Harris	def.	Thiago Vieira	TKO (punches)	2	1:04
Middleweight	Antonio Marcos Pirata	def.	Jeremy Smith	Decision (split) (29–28, 28–29, 29–28)	3	5:00
Lightweight	Luan Santiago	def.	Ivan Castillo	TKO (punches)	1	2:23
Catchweight (150 lb)	Julio Cesar Neves Jr.	def.	Fernando Colman	Decision (unanimous) (30–27, 30–27, 29–28)	3	5:00
Bantamweight	Felipe Efrain	def.	Walel Watson	KO (punch to the body)	2	2:10
Preliminary Card
Flyweight	Marcel Adur	def.	Iván López	KO (punches)	2	2:40
Featherweight	Rogério Bontorin	def.	Jon Olivar	Submission (rear-naked choke)	1	3:00
Bantamweight	Cristiano Souza	def.	Cristian Quiñónez	TKO (punches)	2	2:35
Featherweight	Max Lima	def.	Bruno Roverso	KO (punch)	2	1:50

== Bonus Awards ==
- Fight of the Night: Marcos Pirata x Jeremy Smith
- Knockout of the Night: Felipe Efrain
- Submission of the Night: Lucas Martins
