= Brave 5: Go For Glory =

Brave Combat Federation MMA event in 2017

- Promotion: Brave Combat Federation
- Date: April 22nd, 2017
- Venue: Sardar Vallabhbhai Patel Indoor Stadium
- City: Mumbai, India

Event chronology
Brave 4: Unstoppable	Brave 5: Go For Glory	Brave 6: Kazakhstan

Brave 5: Go For Glory (also known as Brave 5) was a mixed martial arts event held live by the Brave Combat Federation on Sunday April 22, 2017, at the Sardar Vallabhbhai Patel Indoor Stadium in Mumbai, India. The event was broadcast live online and locally through Bahrain TV, ABS-CBN Sports and Action, Combate, Claro Sports and OSN Sports.

== Background ==
Brave 2: Dynasty was Brave Combat Federation's fifth card, the third to take place outside Bahrain, where the company headquarters is located, and the first one in the Indian subcontinent.

Mohammad Farhad was supposed to face Aziz Julaidan in a featured bantamweight bout but Julaidan was forced to withdraw due to a last-minute injury. India's Irfan Khan was then called and fought Farhad in the only match between Mumbai-based fighters.

Bahrain's Hamza Kooheji was supposed to fight India's Chaitanya Gavali in a featured bantamweight bout but was injured during a training session and pulled from the card. Hamza was replaced by Jeremy Pacatiw, from the Philippines.

=== The Muneer-Mangat rivalry ===
Labeled by the local media as the biggest rivalry in the history of combat sports in India, the bad blood between Gurdarshan Mangat and Abdul Muneer started with a fan poll conducted by The Fan Garage to pick the best Indian fighter in 2016, won by Muneer.

A fight was then set in India to determine who was the country's best fighter. Since they do not compete in the same division, Gurdarshan moved up to featherweight for the bout, set as the co-main event of the evening.

After an extensive war of words before the match, the rivalry reached its peak during the official weigh-ins, a day before the event when Gurdarshan and Muneer almost started a fight on the stage after an intense staredown.

=== The main event controversy ===
Originally a decision win in favor of Carl Booth, the main event of the evening was surrounded by controversy, being eventually overturned into a no contest.

The fight was supposed to be a 5-minute x 5-round bout but ended up being finished between rounds 4 and 5. The All India Mixed Martial Arts Federation (AIMMAF) opened and investigation and decided to overturn the result to a no contest.

=== Aftermath ===
After their fight, Gurdarshan and Muneer showed a great amount of respect for each other. Meanwhile, Irfan Khan expressed his desire to have a rematch with Mohammed Farhad. At the same time, Ahmed Faress and Mohammed Farhad noted that they would love to fight Mangat next.

== Broadcast ==
The event was broadcast internationally online for free through Brave's official website and YouTube channel. In addition, the card was also broadcast in Bahrain through Bahrain TV, OSN Sports, Claro Sports, Combate, and ABS-CBN Sports and Action.

=== Broadcasting team ===
- Play-by-play commentator: Cyrus Fees
- Color Commentator: Rama Reddy
- Cage announcer: Carlos Kremer

== Results ==
Main Card (TV)
Weight class				Method	Round	Time	Notes
Welterweight	Carl Booth	vs.	Tahar Hadbi	No Contest (overturned)	3	5:00	(Note: Originally a unanimous decision win for Booth; overturned after the bout scheduled for 5 rounds mistakenly stopped after 3 rounds.)
Featherweight	Gurdarshan Mangat	def.	Abdul Muneer	Decision (unanimous) (30–26, 30–27, 30–27)	3	5:00
Featherweight	Jakub Kowalewicz	def.	Alex da Silva Coelho	Decision (unanimous) (29–28, 29–28, 29–28)	3	5:00
Lightweight	Erick da Silva	def.	Brian Hooi	Decision (split) (29–28, 28–29, 29x–28)	3	5:00
Bantamweight	Jeremy Pacatiw	def.	Chaitanya Gavali	Decision (split) (30–27, 29–30, 30–27)	3	5:00
Catchweight (150 lb)	Alejandro Martinez	def.	Paulo Gonçalves	TKO (punches)	2	4:37
Featherweight	Rolando Dy	vs.	Nelson Paes	No Contest (accidental clash of heads)	1	0:28	(Note: Accidental clash of heads rendered Paes unable to continue.)
Bantamweight	Mohammad Farhad	def.	Irfan Khan	TKO (punches)	1	0:40
Preliminary card (bravefights.com)
Bantamweight	Ahmed Faress	def.	Bharat Khandare	Submission (triangle choke)	1	3:19
Lightweight	Hardeep Rai	def.	Arnan Chaiyasan	Submission (armbar)	1	2:10

== Bonus Awards ==
- Fight of the Night: Haider Farman x Jomar Pa-ac
- Knockout of the Night: Carl Booth
- Submission of the Night: Elias Boudegzdame
