= Brave 2: Dynasty =

Brave Combat Federation MMA event in 2016

- Promotion: Brave Combat Federation
- Date: December 2nd, 2016
- Venue: Khalifa Sports City Arena
- City: Isa Town, Bahrain

Event chronology
Brave 1: The Beginning	Brave 2: Dynasty	Brave 3: Battle in Brazil

Brave 2: Dynasty (also known as Brave 2) was a mixed martial arts event held live by Brave Combat Federation on Friday December 2, 2016 at the Khalifa Sports City in Isa Town, Bahrain. The event was broadcast live online and locally through Bahrain TV, ABS-CBN Sports and Action, and OSN Sports.

== Background ==
Brave 2: Dynasty was Brave Combat Federation's second card and the second to take place in Bahrain, where the company headquarters is located.

The event was the third professional mixed martial arts fight night to take place in Bahrain, after Desert Force 11 on March 7, 2014, and its predecessor Brave 1: The Beginning on September 23, 2016.

Brave 2 was originally supposed to be headlined by the fight between Mexico's Masio Fullen and Germany's Alan Omer for the inaugural featherweight title. One week before the fight, Omer suffered a severe eyebrow laceration and pulled from the fight. One day later, Masio Fullen also pulled, due to a rib injury and the title fight was canceled. Brave then promoted Gadzhimusa Gaziev vs Carl Booth from the co-main event to the main event spot.

With the card dropping to nine bouts after Omer vs Fullen being scrapped, the promotion added a tenth bout, a last-minute strawweight addition between Jomar Pa-ac and Haider Farman.

Ottman Azaitar was supposed to face New Zealand's John Vake in a featured main card fight but Vake failed to reach an agreement for the bout, being replaced by Kevin Koldobsky in the Welterweight match.

SBG Ireland's Ben Forsyth was supposed to make his Brave debut against India's Amit Thapa but Thapa failed to reach an agreement for the bout. In turn, Tyree Fortune, from the United States, was scheduled to fight Forsyth.

=== The Maradona controversy ===
One of the biggest controversies of Brave 2 promotion involved Argentina's football player and FIFA World Cup champion Diego Maradona. Before the event, Maradona appeared in a video giving his support to Ottman Azaitar, whose brother is friends with the former footballer. The story came up in social media and the Argentinian fans got revolted with the support from the idol to a foreign athlete instead of his fellow countryman Kevin Koldobsky.

== Broadcast ==
The event was broadcast internationally online, through Brave's official website and YouTube channel, for free. In addition, the card was also broadcast in Bahrain through Bahrain TV, Middle East through OSN Sports, and Asia through ABS-CBN Sports and Action.

=== Broadcasting team ===
- Play-by-play commentator: Cyrus Fees
- Color Commentator: Alex Soto (former UFC, Titan FC, and Bellator fighter)
- Cage announcer: Carlos Kremer

== Results ==
Main Card
Weight class				Method	Round	Time	Notes
Welterweight	Carl Booth	def.	Gadzhimusa Gaziev	TKO (punches)	2	2:24
Welterweight	Ottman Azaitar	def.	Kevin Koldobsky	Decision (unanimous) (30–27, 30–27, 30–27)	3	5:00
Bantamweight	Hamza Kooheji	def.	Jeremy Pacatiw	Decision (unanimous) (29–28, 29–28, 29–28)	3	5:00
Welterweight	Jarrah Al-Silawi	def.	Erik Carlsson	Submission (kimura)	2	1:39
Featherweight	Elias Boudegzdame	def.	Walel Watson	Submission (kimura)	1	1:47
Preliminary Card
Featherweight	Alex da Silva Coelho	def.	Daniel Swain	TKO (punches)	2	4:37
Bantamweight	Gurdarshan Mangat	def.	Troy Bantiag	TKO (punches)	2	0:23
Light Heavyweight	Tyree Fortune	def.	Ben Forsyth	Decision (unanimous) (30–27, 30–27, 30–27)	3	5:00
Bantamweight	Cristian Quiñónez	def.	Ahmed Faress	TKO (punches)	2	2:46
Flyweight	Jomar Pa-ac	def.	Haider Farman	Decision (unanimous) (30–27, 29–28, 29–28)	3	5:00

== Bonus Awards ==
- Fight of the Night: Haider Farman x Jomar Pa-ac
- Knockout of the Night: Carl Booth
- Submission of the Night: Elias Boudegzdame
