= Brave 1: The Beginning =

Brave Combat Federation MMA event in 2016

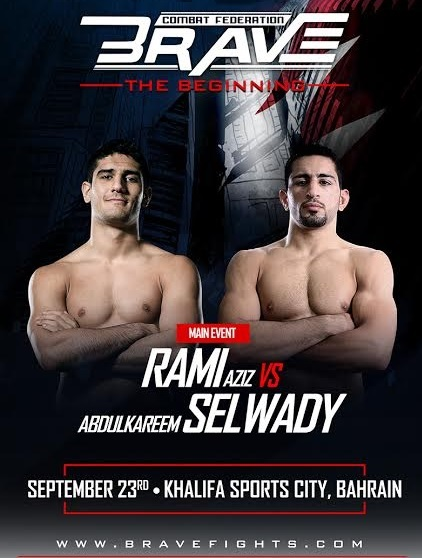
- The poster for Brave 1: The Beginning
- Promotion: Brave Combat Federation
- Date: September 23rd, 2016
- Venue: Khalifa Sports City Arena
- City: Isa Town, Bahrain

Event chronology
Brave 1: The Beginning	Brave 2: Dynasty

Brave 1: The Beginning (also known as Brave 1 and Brave: The Beginning) was a mixed martial arts event held live by Brave Combat Federation on Friday September 23, 2016 at the Khalifa Sports City in Isa Town, Bahrain. The event was broadcast live online and locally through Bahrain TV.

== Background ==
Brave 1: The Beginning was Brave Combat Federation's debut card and took place on its founder and patron's, Sheikh Khalid bin Hamad Al Khalifa, 27th birthday.

The event was the second professional Mixed Martial Arts fight night to take place in Bahrain, after Desert Force 11 on March 7, 2014, but the first one involving a Bahrain-based promotion. The card was officially announced in the promotion's launching press conference, on July 27, 2016.

Brave 1 was originally supposed to be headlined by the welterweight bout between Lebanon's Mohammad Fakhreddine and Brazil's Thiago "Monstro" Vieira. Six days before the fight, though, Fakhreddine suffered a knee injury and pulled from the fight, being replaced by Russia's Gadzhimusa Gaziev. Gaziev vs Vieira was then moved to the co-main event position on the fight card, with Abdul Kareem Al-Selwady vs Rami Aziz becoming the new main event of the evening.

For years, Abdul Kareem Al-Selwady vs Rami Aziz was one of the hottest rivalries in Middle East. The Iraqi started calling out the opponent when he was still the Desert Force featherweight champion, but the fight never took place in the promotion. With both fighters signing with Brave simultaneously, the agreement for the anticipated bout came soon and the promotion was marked by an intense war of words.

A bout between Russia's Eldar Eldarov and Ireland's Peter Queally, from SBG Ireland, was in the works for this card but Queally didn't reach an agreement with Brave and Eldar ended up facing Kevin Koldobsky, also from SBG.

Ivan Lopez, from Mexico, was originally scheduled to face Crisanto Pitpitunge, from the Philippines, in a featured flyweight bout but Crisanto pulled from the fight due to an injury. Jessie Rafols, also from the Philippines, was chosen as his replacement.

== Broadcast ==
The event was broadcast internationally online, through Brave's official website and YouTube channel, for free. In addition, the card was also broadcast in Bahrain, and in selected cable companies, through Bahrain TV.

=== Broadcasting team ===
- Play-by-play commentator: Cyrus Fees
- Color Commentator: José "Shorty" Torres (Titan FC champion)
- Cage announcer: Carlos Kremer

== Results ==
Main Card
Weight class				Method	Round	Time	Notes
Lightweight	Abdul-Kareem Al-Selwady	def.	Rami Aziz	Submission (rear-naked choke)	1	4:30
Welterweight	Gadzhimusa Gaziev	def.	Thiago Vieira	TKO (punches)	1	4:01
Welterweight	Ahmed Amir	def.	Richie Martinez	TKO (punches)	1	2:15
Featherweight	Masio Fullen	def.	Abdul Muneer	TKO (punches)	1	3:50
Welterweight	Eldar Eldarov	def.	Kevin Koldobsky	Decision (unanimous) (30–27, 30–27, 30–27)	3	5:00
Preliminary Card
Bantamweight	Hamza Kooheji	def.	Mohamed Mashaly	Submission (north-south choke)	2	3:01
Flyweight	Iván López	def.	Jessie Rafols	Submission (rear-naked choke)	1	3:16
Bantamweight	Mohammed Farhad	def.	Zouhir Badre-Eddine	TKO (punches)	2	3:04
Bantamweight	Stephen Loman	def.	Frans Mlambo	Decision (unanimous) (29–28, 29–28, 29–28)	3	5:00
Flyweight	Atif Mohammad Khadim	def.	Sunny Khatri	Decision (unanimous) (30–27, 29–28, 29–28)	3	5:00

== Bonus Awards ==
- Fight of the Night: Mark Stephen Loman vs Frans Mlambo
- Knockout of the Night: Gadzhimusa Gaziev
- Submission of the Night: Abdul Kareem Al-Selwady
