= Haya Al Qassim =

Bahraini journalist

- هيا القاسم
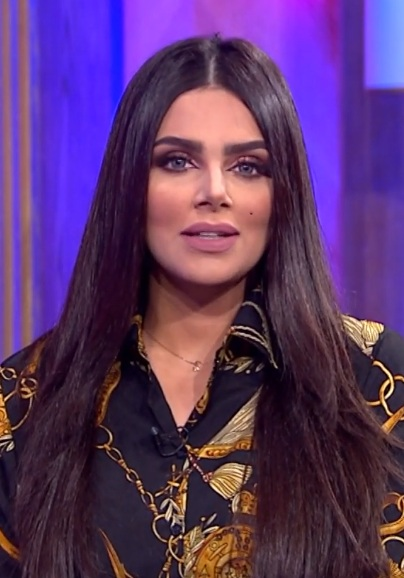
- Haya Al Qassim presents on Bahrain TV, 7 April 2020
- Born: October 18, 1988 (age 37); Muharraq, Bahrain
- Education: University of Bahrain
- Occupation: TV presenter
- Years active: 2004—Present
- Employer: Bahrain Radio and Television Corporation

Haya Al Qassim (Arabic: هيا القاسم, born October 18, 1986) is a Bahraini journalist. A media studies graduate with a Bachelor of Arts from the University of Bahrain, she works for the national broadcaster, the Bahrain Radio and Television Corporation, and is nicknamed the “Butterfly of Bahraini television.” She began her media career in 2004 as the host of the youth talk show Chat with Batelco, followed in 2009 by the three-year run of the youth news show Youth Time.

From 2012 to 2014, she hosted بين يديك (“In Your Hands”), a general-interest newsmagazine. Finally, since 2014 she has hosted هذا الأسبوع (“This Week”), a news show viewed throughout the Gulf states. Her work came to the attention of the King of Bahrain, Hamad bin Isa Al Khalifa, who has appeared with Al Qassim on Bahraini newspaper covers. His two sons, Their Highnesses Nasser bin Hamad Al Khalifa and Khalid bin Hamad Al Khalifa, both appeared on Youth Time to discuss their concerns and hobbies, a first in the history of the kingdom.
