= Bahrain Youth Radio =

Bahraini radio channel

Bahrain Youth Radio Arabic: إذاعة البحرين الشبابية
Bahrain
- Frequency: 98.4
- Branding: Shabab

Programming
- Affiliations: Bahrain Radio and Television Corporation

History
- First air date: February 14, 2010

Bahrain Youth Radio (Arabic: إذاعة البحرين الشبابية), or 98.4 Shabab, is a Bahraini radio channel affiliated with the Bahrain Radio and Television Corporation. Launched on February 14, 2010, it takes its frequency and name from the percentage of votes in favor of the National Action Charter of Bahrain that established limited constitutional rule in 2001.

== Mission ==
Its mission is to contribute to positive thinking and values enrichment in Bahraini youth, according to its founding statement.

== Programs ==
- صباح الخير يا شباب (“Good Morning, Chums”)
- برنامج رادار (“Radar”)
- برنامج لبيه (“Liby’s Show”)
- برنامج سري للغاية (“Top Secret”)
- برنامج الاثنين الرياضي (“Monday Sports”)
- برنامج مفاتيح (“Keys Show”)
- برنامج فيتو (“Vito’s Show”)
- برنامج راديو مسنجر (“Radio Messenger”)
