= Cristian Quiñónez =

Mexican mixed martial artist (born 1996)

- Born: Cristian de Jesús Quiñónez Navarro; April 26, 1996 (age 30); Tlaltenango, Zacatecas, Mexico
- Other names: Problema
- Height: 5 ft 10 in (1.78 m)
- Weight: 61 kg (134 lb; 9 st 8 lb)
- Division: Bantamweight
- Years active: 2013–present

Mixed martial arts record
- Total: 24
- Wins: 19
- By knockout: 10
- By submission: 3
- By decision: 6
- Losses: 5
- By knockout: 2
- By submission: 3

Cristian de Jesús Quiñónez Navarro (born April 26, 1996) is a Mexican mixed martial artist who competes in the Bantamweight division of Ultimate Fighting Championship (UFC). Previously, Quiñónez was the bantamweight champion in the Ultimate Warrior Challenge Mexico promotion.

== Background ==
Cristian Quiñónez was born in Tlaltenango de Sánchez Román, in the state of Zacatecas, Mexico. From his teenage years, he began training in martial arts with his older brother, José Alberto.

== Mixed martial arts career ==
=== Ultimate Warrior Challenge México ===
On May 17, 2014, Quiñónez made his professional debut at the Ultimate Warrior Challenge Mexico's event UWC & EVT: Duarte vs. Beristaín, defeating Arnoldo Castillo by submission in the first round. He then recorded one win and one loss before moving to other promotions.

=== Brave Combat Federation ===
Quiñónez's first fights in a major promotion outside his native Mexico were with the fledgling Brave Combat Federation, based in Bahrain. In his debut, he was scheduled to face Ahmed Faress on December 2, 2016, at Brave 2: Dynasty; he won the fight by technical knockout in the second round.

On March 18, 2017, Quiñónez faced Cristiano Souza at the following event, Brave 3: Battle In Brazil. He lost the fight by technical knockout in the second round.

=== Combate Americas ===
In 2018, Quiñónez joined Combate Americas to face Vinicius Oliveira at Combate Americas: Mexico vs. The World on May 18, winning the fight by TKO due to a medical stoppage in the second round.

Quiñónez faced Víctor Madrigal on October 26, 2018, at Combate Americas: The Battle of Guadalajara. He lost the fight by submission in the third round after an armbar by Madrigal.

=== Return to UWC ===
After a five-year hiatus, Quiñónez returned to UWC in late 2020, facing Erick Ruano on November 13 of that year at UWC Mexico 24 and securing a decisive first-round technical knockout victory.

At UWC Mexico 25, held on February 26, 2021, Quiñónez headlined the event against Adonilton Matos. He won the fight by unanimous decision.

=== Dana White's Contender Series ===
In October 2021, Quiñónez participated in the fifth season of Dana White's Contender Series (week 9) with the goal of entering the UFC. He faced Xiao Long on October 16, defeating him by unanimous decision and becoming one of the five fighters who earned a contract.

=== Ultimate Fighting Championship ===
Quiñónez was scheduled to face Youssef Zalal on August 13, 2022, at UFC on ESPN 41. However, Quiñónez was forced out of the event due to visa issues and was replaced by Da'Mon Blackshear.

Quiñónez made his UFC debut on September 3, 2022, at UFC Fight Night 209 against Khalid Taha as a replacement for Taylor Lapilus. He won the fight by technical knockout in the first round.

Quiñónez faced Kang Kyung-ho on June 17, 2023, at UFC on ESPN 47. He lost the fight by submission in the first round.

Quiñónez faced Raoni Barcelos on February 24, 2024, at UFC Fight Night 237. He lost the fight, again by submission, this time in the third round.

He was scheduled to face Adrian Yanez on November 8, 2025, at UFC Fight Night 264, but during the week leading up to the event, Quiñónez withdrew for unknown reasons, and the fight was canceled.

Quiñónez faced Kris Moutinho on February 28, 2026, at UFC Fight Night 268. He won the fight by unanimous decision.

== Championships and accomplishments ==
- Ultimate Warrior Challenge Mexico
  - UWC Bantamweight Championship (one time)

== Mixed martial arts record ==
Professional record breakdown
24 matches	19 wins	5 losses
By knockout	10	2
By submission	3	3
By decision	6	0

Res.	Record	Opponent	Method	Event	Date	Round	Time	Location	Notes
Win	19–5	Kris Moutinho	Decision (unanimous)	UFC Fight Night: Moreno vs. Kavanagh	February 28, 2026	3	5:00	Mexico City, Mexico	
Loss	18–5	Raoni Barcelos	Submission (rear-naked choke)	UFC Fight Night: Moreno vs. Royval 2	February 24, 2024	3	2:04	Mexico City, Mexico	
Loss	18–4	Kang Kyung-ho	Submission (rear-naked choke)	UFC on ESPN: Vettori vs. Cannonier	June 23, 2023	1	2:25	Las Vegas, Nevada, United States	
Win	18–3	Khalid Taha	TKO (punches)	UFC Fight Night: Gane vs. Tuivasa	September 3, 2022	1	3:15	Paris, France	
Win	17–3	Xiao Long	Decision (unanimous)	Dana White's Contender Series 45	October 26, 2021	3	5:00	Las Vegas, Nevada, United States	
Win	16–3	Donny Matos	Decision (unanimous)	UWC Mexico 25	February 26, 2021	5	5:00	Tijuana, Mexico	Won the vacant UWC Bantamweight Championship.
Win	15–3	Erick Ruano Barrera	TKO (punches)	UWC Mexico 24	November 13, 2020	1	4:58	Tijuana, Mexico	
Win	14–3	José Benito Solorzano	Decision (unanimous)	Gladiadores Fight League 2	April 6, 2019	3	5:00	Guatemala City, Guatemala	Catchweight (150 lb) bout.
Loss	13–3	Víctor Madrigal	Submission (rear-naked choke)	Combate 27	October 26, 2018	3	2:14	Guadalajara, Mexico	
Win	13–2	Vinicius Oliveira	TKO (doctor stoppage)	Combate 23	May 18, 2018	2	0:44	Tijuana, Mexico	
Win	12–2	Ricardo Hernández	Submission (rear-naked choke)	Cabo Bato Fights MMA 1	March 15, 2018	1	2:11	Cabo San Lucas, Mexico	
Win	11–2	Diego Illescas	TKO (punches)	Xtreme Fighters Latino 35	August 18, 2017	2	3:05	Mexico City, Mexico	
Loss	10–2	Cristiano Souza	TKO (punches)	Brave CF 3	March 18, 2017	2	2:35	São José dos Pinhais, Brazil	
Win	10–1	Ahmed Faress	TKO (punches)	Brave CF 2	December 2, 2016	2	2:46	Isa Town, Bahrain	
Win	9–1	Matías Vásquez	Decision (split)	Xtreme Fighters Latino: CDMX October 2016	October 14, 2016	3	5:00	Mexico City, Mexico	
Win	8–1	Héctor Valenzuela	Submission	MV Promotions: Glory Fight 2	August 27, 2016	3	N/A	Tijuana, Mexico	Won the Glory Fight Bantamweight Championship.
Win	7–1	Fernando Rodríguez	Decision (unanimous)	The Supreme Cage 6	October 2, 2015	3	5:00	Monterrey, Mexico	
Win	6–1	Agustín Alamillo	TKO (punches)	UWC Mexico 14	June 25, 2015	2	2:13	Tijuana, Mexico	
Win	5–1	Willy Martinez	TKO (punches)	World Best Gladiators 7	March 27, 2015	2	2:13	Delicias, Mexico	Return to Bantamweight. Won the interim WBG Bantamweight Championship.
Loss	4–1	José Ruelas	TKO (punches)	UWC & EVT: Sánchez vs. Castillo	October 18, 2014	3	0:57	Tijuana, Mexico	Lightweight debut.
Win	4–0	Arnoldo Castillo	Submission (armbar)	UWC & EVT: Duarte vs. Beristaín	May 17, 2014	1	2:08	Tijuana, Mexico	
Win	3–0	Gastón Manzur	TKO (retirement)	Jungle Fight 69	May 3, 2014	2	5:00	Itu, Brazil	
Win	2–0	Oscar Galván	TKO (retirement)	Combate Extremo: Solo Los Más Fuertes	October 5, 2013	1	5:00	Monterrey, Mexico	
Win	1–0	Diego Pérez	TKO (doctor stoppage)	Fight Club México 3	August 2, 2013	2	N/A	Aguascalientes, Mexico	Bantamweight debut.

== See also ==
- List of current UFC fighters
- List of Dana White's Contender Series alumni
- List of Mexican UFC fighters
- List of male mixed martial artists
