= Stephen Loman =

Filipino mixed martial arts fighter

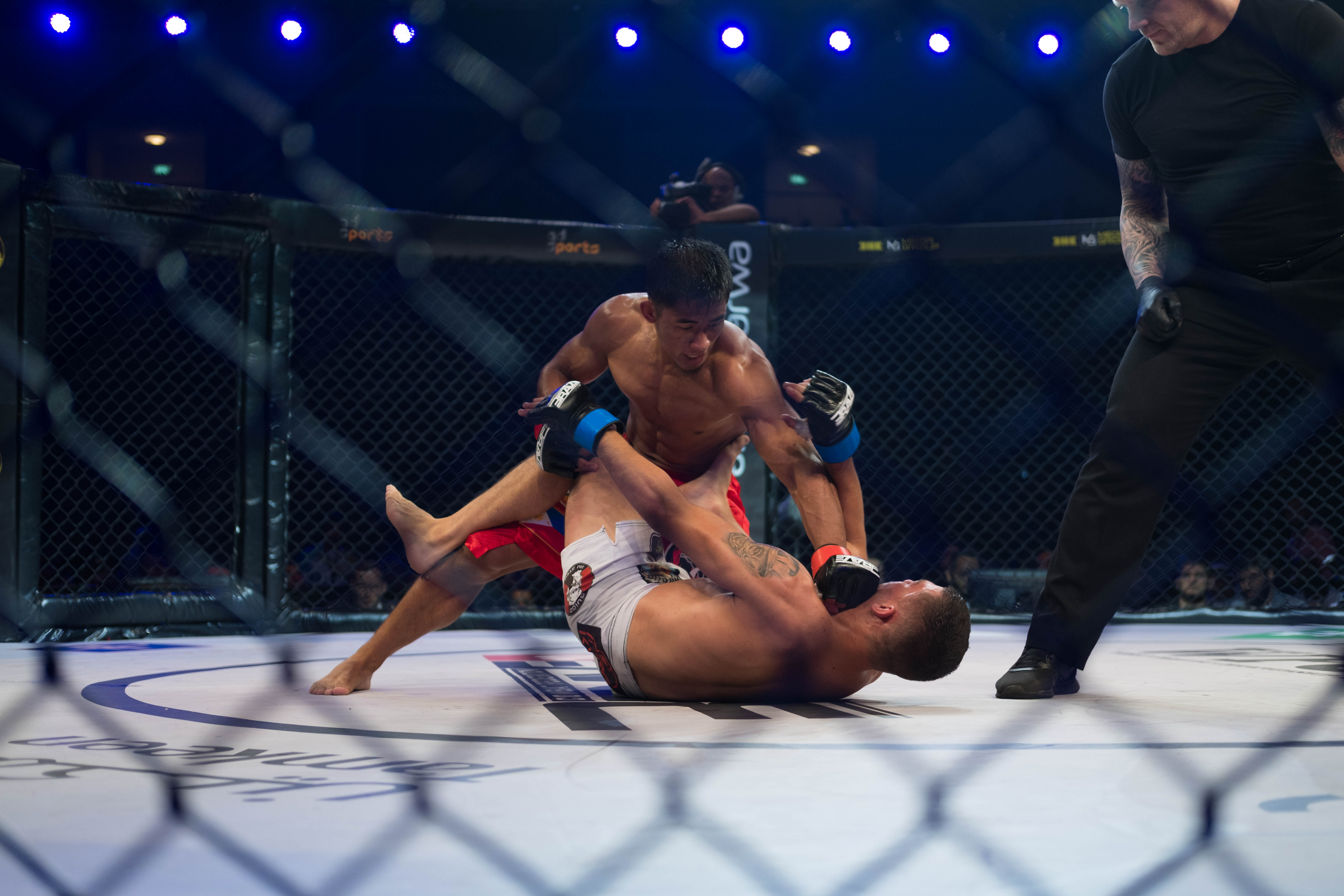
- Stephen Loman at BRAVE CF 18
- Born: Mark Stephen Nabehet Loman; June 24, 1999 (age 27); Baguio, Philippines
- Other names: The Sniper
- Nationality: Filipino
- Height: 168 cm (5 ft 6 in)
- Weight: 64.7 kg (143 lb; 10 st)
- Division: Bantamweight (2012–2019); Featherweight (2021–present) (Note: ONE Championship refers to their 145 lb class as Bantamweight, but under the Association of Boxing Commissions in the United States, 145 lbs is considered Featherweight.)
- Reach: 67.7 in (172 cm)
- Style: Wushu
- Stance: Orthodox
- Fighting out of: Baguio, Philippines
- Team: Team Lakay (until 2024); Lions Nation MMA (2024–present)
- Years active: 2012–present

Mixed martial arts record
- Total: 20
- Wins: 16
- By knockout: 5
- By submission: 2
- By decision: 9
- Losses: 4
- By knockout: 2
- By decision: 2

Other information
- Occupation: Mixed Martial Artist, Influencer, Entrepreneur
- University: University of Baguio
- Mixed martial arts record from Sherdog

Mark Stephen Nabehet Loman (born June 24, 1995) is a Filipino mixed martial artist, currently competes in the Bantamweight division. He has previously fought for ONE Championship and in Brave Combat Federation, where he was the inaugural and former Brave CF Bantamweight Champion.

Loman is the first MMA fighter from the Philippines to win a world championship title at Brave Combat Federation and the longest reigning bantamweight world champion in the promotion's history.

== Mixed martial arts career ==
=== BRAVE Combat Federation ===
Loman made his promotional debut against Frans Mlambo at BRAVE CF 1: The Beginning on September 23, 2016. He won the fight via unanimous decision. He faced Gurdarshan Mangat for the inaugural BRAVE CF Bantamweight Championship at Brave CF 9: The Kingdom of Champions on November 17, 2017, winning the bout via TKO in the first round.

Loman defended his title in a rematch against Frans Mlambo at BRAVE CF 13: European Evolution on June 9, 2018, where he won the fight via unanimous decision. He went on to defend his bantamweight world championship title against Felipe Efrain at BRAVE CF 18 on November 16, 2018. Loman won the fight via unanimous decision.

Loman defense title against former Brave CF Featherweight Champion Elias Boudegzdame at BRAVE CF 22: Storm of Warriors on March 15, 2019. He won the fight via knockout in the fourth round. He went on to defend the title against Louie Sanoudakis at BRAVE CF 30 on November 23, 2019, winning the fight via unanimous decision. He vacated the title while being undefeated to sign with ONE Championship.

=== ONE Championship ===
On February 8, 2021, it was announced that Loman had signed with the ONE Championship and was scheduled to face John Lineker at ONE on TNT 4 on April 28, 2021. However, Loman would later withdraw from the card due to tested positive for COVID-19 and was replaced by Troy Worthen.

He later made his debut against Yusup Saadulaev at ONE: Winter Warriors II on December 3, 2021, and aired December 17, 2021. He won the bout via technical knockout in the first round. Loman faced Shoko Sato, replacing Yusup Saadulaev at ONE: X on March 26, 2022. He won the bout via unanimous decision.

Loman faced Bibiano Fernandes on November 19, 2022, at ONE on Prime Video 4. At weigh-ins, the pair failed to make weight in the bantamweight division and agreed to compete in the 153.25 lbs catchweight. He won the fight via unanimous decision.

Loman faced John Lineker on September 30, 2023, at ONE Fight Night 14. He lost the fight via unanimous decision.

On December 1, 2025, Loman announced via Instagram account that he parted ways with ONE Championship. Two days later, it was reported that he re-signed with Brave Combat Federation.

== Championships and accomplishments ==
- Brave Combat Federation
  - Brave CF Bantamweight Championship (One time; inaugural)
    - Four successful title defences
    - Longest reigning bantamweight world champion at BRAVE CF
    - First MMA fighter from the Philippines to be crowned a champion at BRAVE CF

== Mixed martial arts record ==
Professional record breakdown
20 matches	16 wins	4 losses
By knockout	5	2
By submission	2	0
By decision	9	2

Res.	Record	Opponent	Method	Event	Date	Round	Time	Location	Notes
Loss	16–4	Lasha Abramishvili	Decision (unanimous)	Brave CF 108	September 5, 2026	3	5:00	Pula, Croatia	Return to Bantamweight; Loman missed weight (136.6 lb).
Loss	16–3	John Lineker	Decision (unanimous)	ONE Fight Night 14	September 30, 2023	3	5:00	Kallang, Singapore	
Win	16–2	Bibiano Fernandes	Decision (unanimous)	ONE on Prime Video 4	November 19, 2022	3	5:00	Kallang, Singapore	Catchweight (153.25 lb) bout; both fighters missed weight.
Win	15–2	Shoko Sato	Decision (unanimous)	ONE: X	March 26, 2022	3	5:00	Kallang, Singapore	
Win	14–2	Yusup Saadulaev	TKO (punches)	ONE: Winter Warriors II	December 17, 2021	1	4:09	Kallang, Singapore	Featherweight debut.
Win	13–2	Louie Sanoudakis	Decision (unanimous)	Brave CF 30	November 23, 2019	5	5:00	Hyderabad, India	Defended the Brave CF Bantamweight Championship.
Win	12–2	Elias Boudegzdame	KO (punches)	Brave CF 22	March 15, 2019	4	4:59	Pasay, Philippines	Defended the Brave CF Bantamweight Championship.
Win	11–2	Felipe Efrain	Decision (unanimous)	Brave CF 18	November 16, 2018	5	5:00	Manama, Bahrain	Defended the Brave CF Bantamweight Championship.
Win	10–2	Frans Mlambo	Decision (unanimous)	Brave CF 13	June 9, 2018	5	5:00	Belfast, Northern Ireland	Defended the Brave CF Bantamweight Championship.
Win	9–2	Gurdarshan Mangat	TKO (punches)	Brave CF 9	November 17, 2017	1	2:49	Isa Town, Bahrain	Won the inaugural Brave CF Bantamweight Championship.
Win	8–2	Mark Abelardo	Decision (unanimous)	Pacific Xtreme Combat 55	November 18, 2016	3	5:00	Mangilao, Guam	
Win	7–2	Frans Mlambo	Decision (unanimous)	Brave CF 1	September 23, 2016	3	5:00	Isa Town, Bahrain	
Win	6–2	Ernie Braca	Decision (unanimous)	Pacific Xtreme Combat 53	April 8, 2016	3	5:00	Parañaque, Philippines	
Loss	5–2	Rex De Lara	KO (punch)	Pacific Xtreme Combat 51	January 16, 2016	1	0:12	Parañaque, Philippines	
Win	5–1	Dindo Camansa	Submission (rear-naked choke)	Breaking Barriers 1	October 16, 2015	1	N/A	Baguio, Philippines	
Win	4–1	Richard Moraes	Submission (rear-naked choke)	Team Lakay Championship 9	March 21, 2015	1	N/A	La Trinidad, Philippines	
Loss	3–1	Asker Baragunov	KO (punch)	DARE 1/13: Rebels of MMA	October 12, 2013	1	N/A	Bangkok, Thailand	
Win	3–0	Carlo Laurel	Decision (unanimous)	Team Lakay Championship 7	April 27, 2013	3	5:00	Baguio, Philippines	
Win	2–0	Alvin Velasco	TKO (punches)	URCC: Baguio 5	March 2, 2013	1	1:32	Baguio, Philippines	
Win	1–0	Raffy Lim	TKO (punches)	Team Lakay MMA Eliminations 6	December 11, 2012	1	0:26	La Trinidad, Philippines	Bantamweight debut.
