= Mounir Lazzez =

Tunisian mixed martial arts fighter

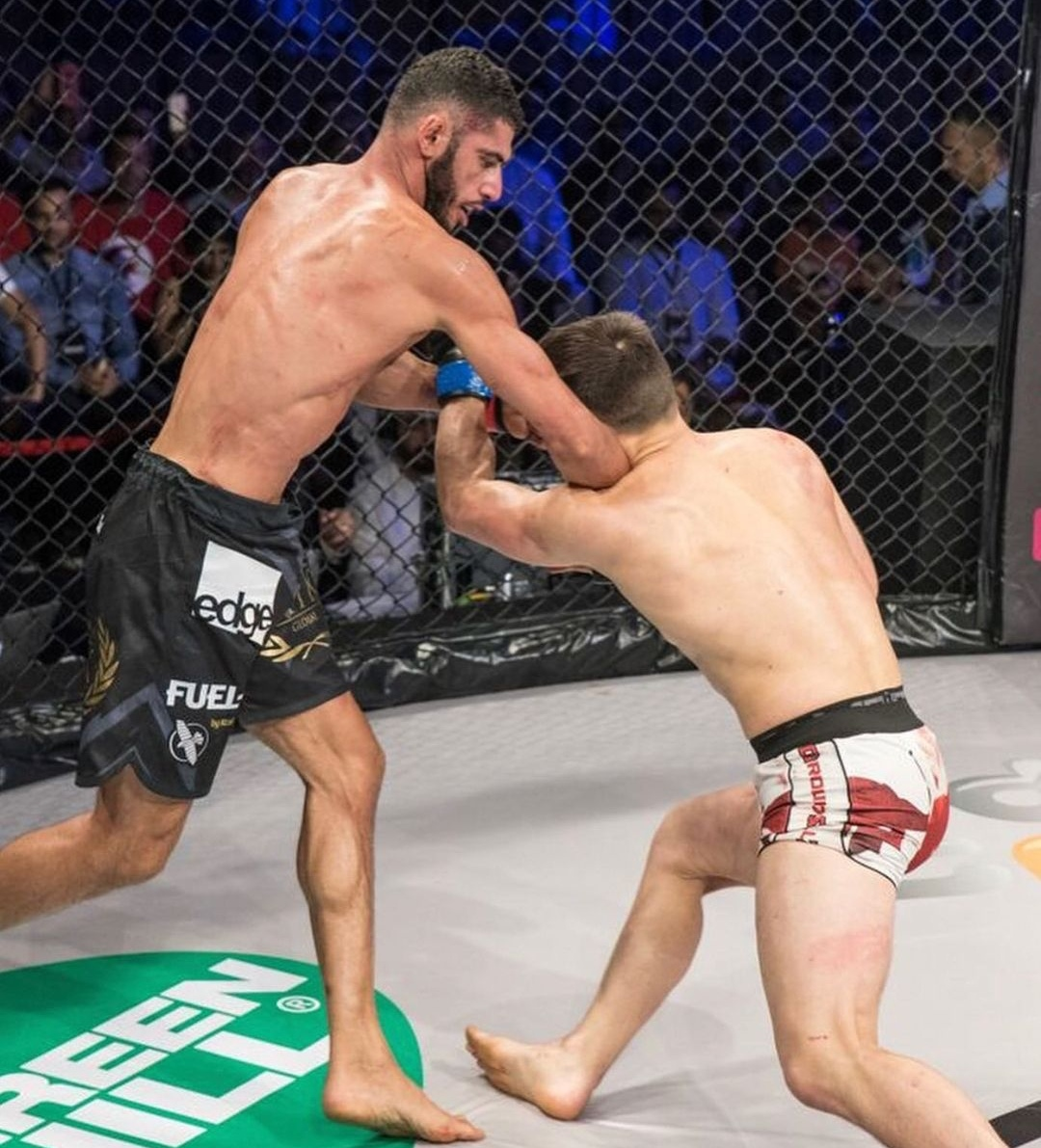
- Mounir Lazzez VS Dmitrijs Homjakovs in 2018.
- Born: November 16, 1987 (age 39); Sfax, Tunisia
- Other names: The Sniper
- Height: 6 ft 1 in (1.85 m)
- Weight: 170 lb (77 kg; 12 st 2 lb)
- Division: Welterweight
- Reach: 76 in (193 cm)
- Fighting out of: Sfax, Tunisia
- Team: Team Nogueira Dubai
- Years active: 2012–2023

Mixed martial arts record
- Total: 14
- Wins: 11
- By knockout: 8
- By decision: 3
- Losses: 3
- By knockout: 1
- By submission: 1
- By decision: 1

Other information
- Mixed martial arts record from Sherdog

Mounir Lazzez (born November 16, 1987) is a Tunisian former mixed martial artist who competed in the Welterweight division. A professional fighter since 2012, he is the first fighter who was born and raised in an Arab country to be signed to the UFC.

== Background ==
Born in the major port town of Sfax in the South East of Tunisia, it was Mounir Lazzez highlights that lead to him being the first fighter that was born and raised in an Arab country to be signed to the UFC. Indeed, it was after Dana White watched Mounir Lazzez highlights whilst sitting in a restaurant that he was so impressed that he decided to sign him to the UFC. A friend of Lazzez had recognized the UFC president Dana White at a restaurant in Las Vegas in the United States of America and took the opportunity to show Mounir Lazzez highlights to him, and White being immediately impressed by the footage took the next steps to sign him to the UFC as soon as possible.

He started MMA classes at the age of 15 in Tunisia, when his parents decided to put him in martial arts because he was being bullied. After competing on the regional and national level, he moved to Canada to focus on his wrestling, spending from 2009 until 2011 there until a business opportunity lured him to Dubai.

== Mixed martial arts career ==
Lazzez made his professional debut in 2012 and compiled a 9–1 record fighting for a variety of Middle Eastern promotions, most notably Brave Combat Federation, where he competed for the Super Lightweight title, losing the fight unanimous decision to Eldar Eldarov.

=== Ultimate Fighting Championship ===
Lazzez faced Abdul Razak Alhassan on July 16, 2020 at UFC on ESPN: Kattar vs. Ige. At the weigh-ins, Alhassan weighed in at 174 pounds, 3 pounds over the welterweight non-title fight limit. He was fined 20% of his purse which went to Lazzez and the bout proceeded at catchweight. He won the fight via unanimous decision. This fight earned him the Fight of the Night bonus.

Lazzez, as a replacement for Christian Aguilera, faced Warlley Alves on January 20, 2021 at UFC on ESPN: Chiesa vs. Magny. He lost the fight via first round TKO.

Lazzez was scheduled to face Niklas Stolze on July 31, 2021 at UFC on ESPN: Hall vs. Strickland. However, Lazzez pulled out just a few days before the event due to visa issues and was replaced by Jared Gooden.

Lazzez was scheduled to face Elizeu Zaleski dos Santos on April 16, 2022 at UFC on ESPN: Luque vs. Muhammad 2. However, Zaleski dos Santos withdrew the week of the fight and was replaced by Ange Loosa. He won the fight via unanimous decision.

Lazzez faced Gabriel Bonfim on January 21, 2023 at UFC 283. He lost the fight via a guillotine choke submission in the first round.

On June 5, 2023, news surfaced that Lazzez had fought out his contract and the organization opted not to renew it.

== Championships and awards ==
=== Mixed martial arts ===
- Ultimate Fighting Championship
  - Fight of the Night (One time) vs. Abdul Razak Alhassan
- Desert Force Championship
  - Desert Force Welterweight Championship (One Time)

== Personal life ==
=== Association with Daniel Kinahan ===
Lazzez is reportedly close to Irish reputed gang boss and boxing promoter Daniel Kinahan, and praised him during his post fight octagon and media interview at UFC on ESPN: Luque vs. Muhammad 2. Kinahan is from Dublin, and is allegedly a senior figure in an international crime syndicate, the Kinahan Cartel, with criminal activities including drugs and firearm smuggling. Kinahan has been sanctioned by the United States government, who have offered a $5 million reward for key information on Kinahan and his brother and father.

== Mixed martial arts record ==
Professional record breakdown
14 matches	11 wins	3 losses
By knockout	8	1
By submission	0	1
By decision	3	1

Res.	Record	Opponent	Method	Event	Date	Round	Time	Location	Notes
Loss	11–3	Gabriel Bonfim	Submission (guillotine choke)	UFC 283	January 21, 2023	1	0:49	Rio de Janeiro, Brazil	
Win	11–2	Ange Loosa	Decision (unanimous)	UFC on ESPN: Luque vs. Muhammad 2	April 16, 2022	3	5:00	Las Vegas, Nevada, United States	
Loss	10–2	Warlley Alves	TKO (body kicks and punches)	UFC on ESPN: Chiesa vs. Magny	January 20, 2021	1	2:35	Abu Dhabi, United Arab Emirates	
Win	10–1	Abdul Razak Alhassan	Decision (unanimous)	UFC on ESPN: Kattar vs. Ige	July 15, 2020	3	5:00	Abu Dhabi, United Arab Emirates	Catchweight (174 lb) bout; Alhassan missed weight. Fight of the Night.
Win	9–1	Arber Murati	TKO (knees and punches)	Probellum MMA Dubai: Lazzez vs. Murati	February 7, 2020	1	0:59	Dubai, United Arab Emirates	
Win	8–1	Sasha Palatnikov	TKO (elbows and punches)	UAE Warriors 8	October 18, 2019	1	4:48	Abu Dhabi, United Arab Emirates	Return to Welterweight.
Loss	7–1	Eldar Eldarov	Decision (unanimous)	Brave CF 23	April 19, 2019	5	5:00	Amman, Jordan	For the vacant Brave CF Super Lightweight Championship.
Win	7–0	Dmitrijs Homjakovs	TKO	Brave CF 16	September 21, 2018	2	4:15	Abu Dhabi, United Arab Emirates	Catchweight (176 lb) bout.
Win	6–0	Christophe Van Dijck	Decision (unanimous)	Phoenix FC 4	December 22, 2017	3	5:00	Dubai, United Arab Emirates	
Win	5–0	Mohamad Ghorabi	TKO (punches)	Desert Force 16	March 23, 2015	2	3:50	Riyadh, Saudi Arabia	Won the vacant Desert Force Welterweight Championship.
Win	4–0	Amr Fathee Wahman	KO (head kick)	Desert Force 11	March 7, 2014	1	2:00	Manama, Bahrain	
Win	3–0	Anas Siraj Mounir	KO (head kick)	Desert Force 10	January 27, 2014	3	1:15	Amman, Jordan	
Win	2–0	Ashkan Mehrdadpoor	TKO (punches)	Dubai FC 3	November 16, 2012	1	2:25	Dubai, United Arab Emirates	
Win	1–0	Andrew Connor	KO (punch)	Dubai FC 2	January 8, 2012	1	0:54	Dubai, United Arab Emirates	

== See also ==
- List of male mixed martial artists
