= Brave Combat Federation =

MMA promoter based in Bahrain

BRAVE Combat Federation
- Current season, competition or edition: 2026 in Brave Combat Federation
- Sport: Mixed martial arts
- Founded: 2016; 10 years ago
- Founder: Khalid bin Hamad Al Khalifa
- President: Mohammed Shahid
- Country: Bahrain
- Headquarters: Seef
- Website: www.bravecf.com

BRAVE Combat Federation is a mixed martial arts (MMA) promotion based in Bahrain. The organization was established on 23 September 2016 by Sheikh Khalid bin Hamad Al Khalifa. BRAVE Combat Federation features mixed martial artists from more than 80 nations located in five continents. BRAVE Combat Federation events are aired though multiple media partners including El Rey Network, Combate, Myx TV, S+A ESPN 5 and Bahrain Radio and Television Corporation.

In 2023, BRAVE Combat Federation set a new record for an MMA promotion hosting events in most number of nations after organizing events in 38 nations worldwide.

The organization was formally launched in 2016 and has established operations in Dublin, São Paulo and Mumbai prior to launching events and for talent relations. BRAVE Combat Federation, alongside the holding company, KHK MMA and Bahrain Mixed Martial Arts Federation hosted the IMMAF World Championships in November, 2017, a partnership which was renewed for 2018 and 2019

In July 2021, BRAVE Combat Federation was nominated for the first time as Promotion of the Year on the World MMA Awards. The organization also has global strategic partnerships with fellow fight promoters Real Xtreme Fighting (RXF), Alash Pride FC, LFC, RXF, WEF, WFC, BFN, Krespost, PRO FC, RSM, Golden Cage, Oktagon, GEC, Beast CF, ATF, NFC, Hexagone MMA, Fight2One, and Victorious Fighting and Entertainment.

== History ==
=== Overview ===
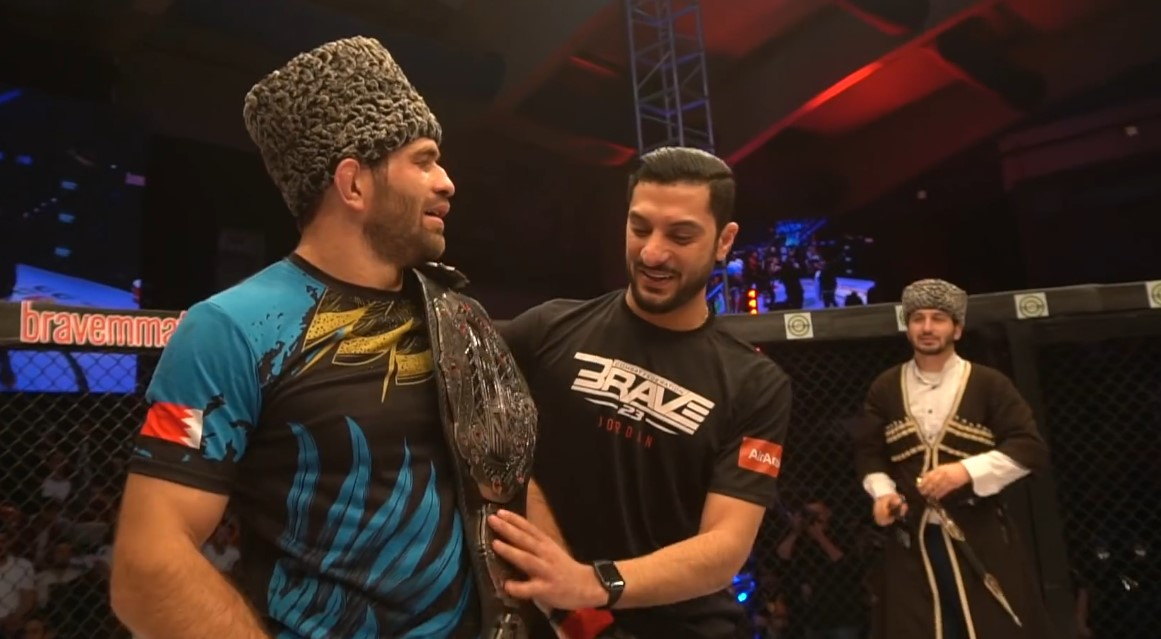
Eldar Eldarov at Brave CF 23 being presented with the BRAVE CF Super Lightweight Championship

KHK MMA is a Bahrain based mixed martial arts organization that promotes the growth of mixed martial arts in the region. KHK MMA Fight Team featured fighters from multiple promotions including Khabib Nurmagomedov, Frankie Edgar, Jose Torres and James Gallagher. Coaches and UFC Hall of Famers like Renzo Gracie, John Kavanagh, Bob Schirmer, and Pete Williams were enlisted to work with KHK MMA.

BRAVE Combat Federation was established under KHK MMA. The promotion held its inaugural event, Brave 1: The Beginning took place in Isa Town, Bahrain, on September 23, 2016, a date which coincided with Sheikh Khalid bin Hamad Al Khalifa's birthday. During its initial phase, BRAVE CF expanded into markets such as Brazil, India, Indonesia, Mexico, Jordan, and the United Arab Emirates, positioning itself as a promotion focused on global talent development rather than a single-region model. BRAVE CF also hosted the first-ever International Combat Week, in partnership with the IMMAF.

Between 2018 and 2021, BRAVE CF accelerated its international growth by hosting events across Europe, Asia, and Africa. The organization entered new markets including Northern Ireland, Morocco, and Kazakhstan. The promotion emphasized partnerships with local organizations and regulatory bodies to develop MMA ecosystems in host countries. This period also saw an increase in athlete diversity, with fighters representing a wide range of nationalities. The events also showcased the former UFC champion and KHK MMA fighter Frankie Edgar as a color commentator Later, MMA legend and BRAVE ambassador Wanderlei Silva. BRAVE Combat Federation became the first global MMA promotion to host an event in Africa, with BRAVE 14, in Tangier, Morocco, on August 18. The event was hosted under the patronage of King Mohammed VI, the king of Morocco.

BRAVE Combat Federation hosted its first show in Ljubljana, Slovenia in 2020, in partnership with WFC. The organization announced BRAVE CF 35 (Brazil), BRAVE CF 36 (Romania), and BRAVE CF 37 (Sweden). However, the shows were cancelled due to the coronavirus pandemic. BRAVE CF returned to action in July, with BRAVE CF 35 and BRAVE CF 36 taking place in Romania, in closed venues. BRAVE CF continued its expansion strategy by increasing the number of host countries and strengthening its presence in Europe and Asia. The organization has also focused on digital distribution and international broadcasting partnerships to expand its global audience reach.

== Rules ==
BRAVE Combat Federation follows the Unified Rules of Mixed Martial Arts that were originally established by the New Jersey State Athletic Control Board and modified by the Nevada State Athletic Commission.

After the Association of Boxing Commissions approved the opening of new weight classes, BRAVE announced it would become the first international promotion to introduce a Super Lightweight division, as well as pushing the Welterweight limit to 175 lbs.

== Weight divisions and champions ==
BRAVE Combat Federation has following weight classes:

Weight class name	Upper limit		Current champion	Date won	Title Defenses
Weight class name	in pounds (lb)	in kilograms (kg)	Current champion	Date won	Title Defenses
Flyweight	125	56.7	(England) Muhammad Mokaev	November 7, 2025	0
Bantamweight	135	61.2	(Serbia) Borislav Nikolić	June 7, 2025	0
Featherweight	145	65.8	(Kyrgyzstan) Nemat Abdrashitov	June 23, 2023	0
Lightweight	155	70.3	(Kyrgyzstan) Abdisalam Kubanychbek	December 5, 2023	3
Super Lightweight	165	74.8	(Bahrain) Eldar Eldarov	April 19, 2019	1
Welterweight (Note: Brave CF refers to their 175 lb weight class as Welterweight, but per the Association of Boxing Commissions in the United States, 175 lbs is considered Super Welterweight.)	175	79.4	(Brazil) Luiz Cado	October 19, 2024	0
Middleweight	185	83.9	(Lebanon) Mohammad Fakhreddine	June 7, 2025	0
Light Heavyweight	205	93.0	(Bosnia and Herzegovina) Erko Jun	September 28, 2024	0
Heavyweight	265	120.0	(Lithuania) Pavel Dailidko	September 28, 2024	2

== Championship history ==
=== Heavyweight Championship ===
206 to 265 lbs (93.4 to 120.2 kg)

No.	Name	Event	Date	Reign (total)	Defenses
1	(Lithuania) Pavel Dailidko def. Patryk Dubiela	Brave CF 88; Ljubljana, Slovenia	Sep 28, 2024	736 days (incumbent)	1. def. Odie Delaney at Brave CF 94 on May 17, 2025 2. def. Gregory Robinet at Brave CF 99 on Oct 18, 2025 3. def. Miha Frlic at Brave CF 106 & WCF 30 on Jun 6, 2026

=== Light Heavyweight Championship ===
186 to 205 lbs (84.3 to 93 kg)

No.	Name	Event	Date	Reign (total)	Defenses
1	(Brazil) Klidson Abreu def. Timo Feucht	Brave CF 8 Curitiba, Brazil	Aug 12, 2017	327 days	1. def. Matt Baker at Brave CF 11 on April 13, 2018
Abreu vacated his title and parted ways with BRAVE CF on July 5, 2018.
2	(Algeria) Mohammed Said Maalem def. Mohammad Fakhreddine	Brave CF 52; Milan, Italy	Aug 1, 2021	14 days	
Said Maalem was stripped of the title on August 15, 2021, when his bout with Fakhreddine was overturned to a no contest due to illegal blows to the back of the head.
3	(Lebanon) Mohammad Fakhreddine def. Mohammed Said Maalem	Brave CF 57; Isa Town, Bahrain	Mar 11, 2022	105 days	
Fakhreddine vacated the title on June 24, 2022, when he left the promotion.
4	(Bosnia and Herzegovina) Erko Jun def. Alexander Wesner	Brave CF 88; Ljubljana, Slovenia	Sep 28, 2024	616 days	
5	(Algeria) Mohamed Said Maalem (2)	Brave CF 106 & WFC 30; Ljubljana, Slovenia	Jun 6, 2026	120 days (incumbent)	

=== Middleweight Championship ===
176 to 185 lbs (79.8 to 83.9 kg)

No.	Name	Event	Date	Reign (total)	Defenses
1	(Brazil) Daniel Souza Pereira def. Chad Hanekom	Brave CF 31; Durban, South Africa	Dec 7, 2019	285 days	
2	(Lebanon) Mohammad Fakhreddine	Brave CF 41; Riffa, Bahrain	Sep 17, 2020	645 days	
Fakhreddine vacated the title on June 24, 2022, when he left the promotion.
3	(Lebanon) Mohammad Fakhreddine (2) def. Erko Jun	Brave CF 96; Ljubljana, Slovenia	Jun 7, 2025	484 days (incumbent)	

=== Welterweight Championship ===
166 to 175 lbs (75.3 kg to 79.4 kg)

In 2019 Brave CF revised this weight limit from 170 lb (77.1 kg) to its current limits.

No.	Name	Event	Date	Reign (total)	Defenses
1	(Guyana) Carlston Harris def. Carl Booth	Brave CF 8 Curitiba, Brazil	Aug 12, 2017	405 days	
2	(Jordan) Jarrah Al-Silawi	Brave CF 16; Abu Dhabi, UAE	Sep 21, 2018	210 days	
3	(France) Abdoul Abdouraguimov	Brave CF 23; Amman, Jordan	Apr 19, 2019	168 days	
4	(Jordan) Jarrah Al-Silawi (2)	Brave CF 27; Abu Dhabi, UAE	Oct 4, 2019	706 days	1. def. Ismail Naurdiev at Brave CF 50 on Apr 1, 2021
Al-Silawi vacated his title after signing with Professional Fighters League.
5	(Poland) Marcin Bandel def. Ismail Naurdiev	Brave CF 63; Isa Town, Bahrain	Oct 19, 2022	422 days	
6	(Russia) Kamal Magomedov	Brave CF 77; Isa Town, Bahrain	Dec 5, 2023	319 days	
7	(Brazil) Luiz Cado	Brave CF 89; Tenerife, Spain	Oct 19, 2024	715 days (incumbent)	

=== Super Lightweight Championship ===
156 to 165 lbs (70.8 kg to 74.9 kg)

No.	Name	Event	Date	Reign (total)	Defenses
1	(Bahrain) Eldar Eldarov def. Mounir Lazzez	Brave CF 23; Amman, Jordan	Apr 19, 2019	2725 days (incumbent)	1. def. Leonardo Mafra at Brave CF 46 on Jan 16, 2021
Joilton Lutterbach defeated Mihail Kotruţă for the interim Super Lightweight Championship at Brave CF 68 on December 17, 2022, but was ineligible to win the title due to missing weight.

=== Lightweight Championship ===
146 to 155 lbs (66.2 to 70.3 kg)

No.	Name	Event	Date	Reign (total)	Defenses
1	(Germany) Ottman Azaitar def. Alejandro Martinez	Brave CF 9 Isa Town, Bahrain	Nov 17, 2017	671 days	
Azaitar was stripped of his title and released by BRAVE on September 19, 2018 for not defending the belt
-	(Brazil) Lucas Martins def. Luan Santiago Carvalho for interim title	Brave CF 11; Belo Horizonte, Brazil	Apr 13, 2018	–	
2	(Brazil) Lucas Martins promoted to undisputed champion	–	Sep 19, 2018	58 days	
3	(Jordan) Abdul-Kareem Al-Selwady	Brave CF 18; Isa Town, Bahrain	Nov 16, 2018	154 days	
4	(Brazil) Luan Santiago Carvalho	Brave CF 23; Amman, Jordan	Apr 19, 2019	133 days	
5	(Brazil) Cleiton Pereira da Silva	Brave CF 25; Belo Horizonte, Brazil	Aug 30, 2019	433 days	
6	(France) Amin Ayoub	Brave CF 44; Riffa, Bahrain	Nov 5, 2020	324 days	
7	(Egypt) Ahmed Amir	Brave CF 54; Konin, Poland	Sep 25, 2021	472 days	
Amir was stripped of his title on January 10, 2023 due to uncertainty regarding his competition status.
–	(Kyrgyzstan) Abdisalam Kubanychbek def. Olzhas Eskaraev for interim title	Brave CF 59; Bukhara, Uzbekistan	Jun 18, 2022	–	
8	(Kyrgyzstan) Abdisalam Kubanychbek def. Kamil Magomedov	Brave CF 69; Belgrade, Serbia	Feb 18, 2023	1324 days (incumbent)	1. def. Lucas Martins at Brave CF 77 on Dec 5, 2023 2. def. Raul Tutarauli at Brave CF 87 on Sep 22, 2024
–	(Georgia (country)) Raul Tutarauli def. Pieter Buist for interim title	Brave CF: Georgia vs. The World; Tbilisi, Georgia	Oct 3, 2025	366 days (incumbent)	

=== Featherweight Championship ===
136 to 145 lbs (61.7 to 65.8 kg)

No.	Name	Event	Date	Reign (total)	Defenses
1	(France) Elias Boudegzdame def. Masio Fullen	Brave CF 4 Abu Dhabi, UAE	May 31, 2017	478 days	1. def. Jakub Kowalewicz at Brave CF 10 on Mar 2, 2018
2	(United States) Bubba Jenkins	Brave CF 16; Abu Dhabi, UAE	Sep 21, 2018	532 days	1. def. Lucas Martins at Brave CF 24 on Jul 25, 2019
Bubba Jenkins vacated his title after signing with Professional Fighters League.
3	(Russia) Roman Bogatov def. Kim Tae-kyun	Brave CF 64; Isa Town, Bahrain	Oct 22, 2022	244 days	
4	(Kyrgyzstan) Nemat Abdrashitov	Brave CF 72; Riffa, Bahrain	Jun 23, 2023	1199 days (incumbent)	
–	(Ukraine) Omar Solomanov def. Rauan Bekbolat for interim title	Brave CF 98; Zhengzhou, China	Sep 19, 2025	380 days (incumbent)	
Abdrashitov vacated his title after signing with Tuff-N-Uff.
5	(Zimbabwe) Nicholas Hwende def. Omar Solomanov	Brave CF 105; Almaty, Kazakhstan	May 31, 2026	126 days (incumbent)	

=== Bantamweight Championship ===
126 to 135 lbs (57.1 to 61.2 kg)

No.	Name	Event	Date	Reign (total)	Defenses
1	(Philippines) Stephen Loman def. Gurdarshan Mangat	Brave CF 9 Isa Town, Bahrain	Nov 17, 2017	1179 days	1. def. Frans Mlambo at Brave CF 13 on Jun 9, 2018; 2. def. Felipe Efrain at Brave CF 18 on Nov 16, 2018; 3. def. Elias Boudegzdame at Brave CF 22 on Mar 15, 2019; 4. def. Louie Sanoudakis at Brave CF 30 on Nov 23, 2019
Loman vacated his title after signing with ONE Championship.
2	(Canada) Brad Katona def. Hamza Kooheji	Brave CF 57; Isa Town, Bahrain	Mar 11, 2022	359 days	1. def. Gamzat Magomedov at Brave CF 63 on Oct 19, 2022
Katona vacated the title, would make his appearance on The Ultimate Fighter 31.
3	(United States) Jose Torres def. Nkosi Ndebele	Brave CF 73; Bogotá, Colombia	Aug 12, 2023	125 days	
4	(South Africa) Nkosi Ndebele	Brave CF 80; Isa Town, Bahrain	Dec 15, 2023	365 days	1. def. Jose Torres at Brave CF 82 on May 11, 2024
5	(Zimbabwe) Nicholas Hwende	Brave CF 91; Isa Town, Bahrain	Dec 13, 2024	176 days	
6	(Serbia) Borislav Nikolic	Brave CF 96; Ljubljana, Slovenia	Jun 7, 2025	484 days (incumbent)	1. def. Hamza Kooheji at Brave CF 100 on Nov 7, 2025

=== Flyweight Championship ===
116 to 125 lbs (52.6 to 57 kg)

No.	Name	Event	Date	Reign (total)	Defenses
1	(England) Muhammad Mokaev def. Gerard Burns	Brave CF 100; Isa Town, Bahrain	Nov 7, 2025	331 days (incumbent)	

== List of events ==
#	Event	Date	Venue	Location
105	Brave CF 104	February 14, 2026	Aleksandar Nikolić Hall	Belgrade, Serbia
104	Brave CF 103	December 23, 2025	Bukhara Universal Sports Complex	Bukhara, Uzbekistan
103	Brave CF 102	November 23, 2025	Hala Tivoli	Ljubljana, Slovenia
102	Brave CF 101	November 9, 2025	Khalifa Sports City Stadium	Isa Town, Bahrain
101	Brave CF 100	November 7, 2025	Khalifa Sports City Stadium	Isa Town, Bahrain
100	Brave CF 99	October 18, 2025	Twinsbet Arena	Vilnius, Lithuania
99	Brave CF: Georgia vs. The World	October 3, 2025	Tbilisi New Sports Palace	Tbilisi, Georgia
98	Brave CF 98	September 19, 2025	Henan TV Studio 8	Zhengzhou, China
97	Brave CF 97	July 12, 2025	Arena Burgas	Burgas, Bulgaria
96	Brave CF 96	June 7, 2025	Hala Tivoli	Ljubljana, Slovenia
95	Brave CF 95	May 31, 2025	Pabellón Santiago Martín	Tenerife, Spain
94	Brave CF 94	May 17, 2025	Geneva Arena	Geneva, Switzerland
93	BRAVE CF 93	April 18, 2025	Henan TV Television Studio	Zhengzhou, China
92	BRAVE CF 92	December 15, 2024	Khalifa Sports City Arena	Isa Town, Bahrain
91	BRAVE CF 91	December 13, 2024	Khalifa Sports City Arena	Isa Town, Bahrain
90	BRAVE CF 90	November 23, 2024	Mulitversum Schwechat	Vienna, Austria
89	BRAVE CF 89	October 19, 2024	Pabellon Santiago Martin	Tenerife, Spain
88	BRAVE CF 88	September 28, 2024	Hala Tivoli	Ljubljana, Slovenia
87	BRAVE CF 87	September 22, 2024	Hoornse Vaart	Alkmaar, Netherlands
86	BRAVE CF 86	August 24, 2024	Burgas Arena	Burgas, Bulgaria
85	BRAVE CF 85	August 18, 2024	Captain Fasih Babar Amin Shaheed Sports Complex	Lahore, Pakistan
84	BRAVE CF 84	August 9, 2024	Henan TV Television Studio	Zhengzhou, China
83	BRAVE CF 83	May 25, 2024	Hoornse Vaart	Alkmaar, Netherlands
82	BRAVE CF 82	May 11, 2024	Cote d'Or National Sports Complex	Cote d'Or, Mauritius
81	BRAVE CF 81	April 20, 2024	Hala Tivoli	Ljubljana, Slovenia
80	BRAVE CF 80	December 15, 2023	Khalifa Sports City Arena	Isa Town, Bahrain
79	BRAVE CF 79	December 8, 2023	Khalifa Sports City Arena	Isa Town, Bahrain
78	BRAVE CF 78	December 7, 2023	Centro de Formação Olímpica	Fortaleza, Brazil
77	BRAVE CF 77	December 5, 2023	Khalifa Sports City Arena	Isa Town, Bahrain
76	BRAVE CF 76	November 25, 2023	Balai Sarbini	Jakarta, Indonesia
75	BRAVE CF 75	November 18, 2023	Pacho Camurria Arena	Tenerife, Spain
74	BRAVE CF 74	September 7, 2023	H Arena	Nantes, France
73	BRAVE CF 73: Pan-American Combat Week 2023	August 12, 2023	Coliseo El Salitre	Bogotá, Colombia
72	BRAVE CF 72	June 23, 2023	National Stadium	Riffa, Bahrain
71	BRAVE CF 71	June 19, 2023	National Stadium	Riffa, Bahrain
70	BRAVE CF 70	April 23, 2023	Hala Tivoli	Ljubljana, Slovenia
69	BRAVE CF 69	February 18, 2023	Stark Arena	Belgrade, Serbia
68	BRAVE CF 68	December 17, 2022	Maritim Hotel	Düsseldorf, Germany
67	BRAVE CF 67	December 12, 2022	Hall B	Riffa, Bahrain
66	BRAVE CF 66	November 26, 2022	Politeknik Pariwisata	Bali, Indonesia
65	BRAVE CF 65: Rumble in the Kingdom	October 28, 2022	Khalifa Sports City Stadium	Isa Town, Bahrain
64	BRAVE CF 64: African All Star	October 22, 2022	Khalifa Sports City Stadium	Isa Town, Bahrain
63	BRAVE CF 63: Two Title Fights	October 19, 2022	Khalifa Sports City Stadium	Isa Town, Bahrain
62	BRAVE CF 62	September 30, 2022	Baluan Sholak Sports Palace	Almaty, Kazakhstan
61	BRAVE CF 61	August 6, 2022	Maritim Hotel	Bonn, Germany
60	BRAVE CF 60	July 30, 2022	National Stadium	Riffa, Bahrain
59	BRAVE CF 59	June 18, 2022	Amphitheater Bukhara	Bukhara, Uzbekistan
58	BRAVE CF 58	April 30, 2022	Samsan World Gymnasium	Incheon, South Korea
57	BRAVE CF 57	March 11, 2022	Khalifa Sports City Stadium	Isa Town, Bahrain
56	BRAVE CF 56	December 18, 2021	BEL Expo Center	Belgrade, Serbia
55	BRAVE CF 55	November 6, 2021	—N/a	Rostov-on-Don, Russia
54	BRAVE CF 54	September 24, 2021	—N/a	Konin, Poland
53	BRAVE CF 53	August 21, 2021	—N/a	Almaty, Kazakhstan
52	BRAVE CF 52: Bad Blood	August 1, 2021	—N/a	Milan, Italy
51	BRAVE CF 51: The Future Is Here	June 4, 2021	Falcon Club	Minsk, Belarus
50	BRAVE CF 50	April 1, 2021	Arad Fort	Arad, Bahrain
49	BRAVE CF 49: Super Fights	March 25, 2021	Arad Fort	Arad, Bahrain
48	BRAVE CF 48: Arabian Night	March 18, 2021	Arad Fort	Arad, Bahrain
47	BRAVE CF 47: Asian Domination	March 11, 2021	Arad Fort	Arad, Bahrain
46	BRAVE CF 46	January 16, 2021	WOW Arena	Sochi, Russia
45	BRAVE CF 45	November 19, 2020	National Stadium	Riffa, Bahrain
44	BRAVE CF 44	November 5, 2020	National Stadium	Riffa, Bahrain
43	BRAVE CF 43	October 1, 2020	National Stadium	Riffa, Bahrain
42	BRAVE CF 42	September 24, 2020	National Stadium	Riffa, Bahrain
41	BRAVE CF 41	September 17, 2020	National Stadium	Riffa, Bahrain
40	BRAVE CF 40	August 24, 2020	—N/a	Stockholm, Sweden
39	BRAVE CF 39	August 15, 2020	—N/a	Stockholm, Sweden
38	BRAVE CF 38	August 8, 2020	—N/a	Stockholm, Sweden
37	BRAVE CF 37	August 1, 2020	—N/a	Stockholm, Sweden
36	BRAVE CF 36	July 27, 2020	Berăria H	Bucharest, Romania
35	BRAVE CF 35	July 20, 2020	Berăria H	Bucharest, Romania
34	BRAVE CF 34	January 19, 2020	Hala Tivoli	Ljubljana, Slovenia
33	BRAVE CF 33: Aliskerov vs. Gonzalez	December 27, 2019	Prince Abdullah Al Faisal Stadium	Jeddah, Saudi Arabia
32	BRAVE CF 32: Booth vs. Hassan	December 14, 2019	Sport Palace Kozhomkul	Bishkek, Kyrgyzstan
31	BRAVE CF 31: Hanekom vs. Gaucho	December 7, 2019	Sibaya Casino	Durban, South Africa
30	BRAVE CF 30: Loman vs. Sanoudakis	November 23, 2019	Gachibowli Indoor Arena	Hyderabad, India
29	BRAVE CF 29	November 15, 2019	Khalifa Sports City Arena	Isa Town, Bahrain
28	BRAVE CF 28: Brewin vs. Gierzsewski	November 4, 2019	Beraria H	Bucharest, Romania
27	BRAVE CF 27: Abdoul vs. Jarrah 2	October 4, 2019	Mubadala Arena	Abu Dhabi, United Arab Emirates
26	BRAVE CF 26: Silva vs. Roa	September 7, 2019	Coliseo Hernán Jaramillo	Bogotá, Colombia
25	Brave CF 25: Santiago vs. Silva	August 30, 2019	Juscelino Kubitschek Arena	Belo Horizonte, Brazil
24	Brave CF 24: London	July 25, 2019	Queen Elizabeth Olympic Park	London, England
23	Brave CF 23: Pride and Honor	April 19, 2019	Martyr Rashid Al-Ziyoud Hall Boxing Arena	Amman, Jordan
22	Brave CF 22: Storm of Warriors	March 15, 2019	SM Mall of Asia Arena	Pasay, Philippines
21	Brave CF 21: Saudi Arabia	December 28, 2018	King Abdullah Sports City Indoor Sports Hall	Jeddah, Saudi Arabia
20	Brave CF 20: Chimaev vs. Sidney	December 22, 2018	G. M. C. Balayogi Indoor Stadium	Hyderabad, India
19	BRAVE CF 19: Adam vs. Mark	December 8, 2018	Sun City Resort	Sun City, South Africa
18	BRAVE CF 18: Mineiro vs. Selwady	November 16, 2018	Khalifa Sports City Stadium	Isa Town, Bahrain
17	Brave CF 17: Cavalheiro vs. Abdouraguimov	October 27, 2018	Nishtar Park Sports Concert	Lahore, Pakistan
16	Brave CF 16: Abu Dhabi	September 21, 2018	Mubadala Arena	Abu Dhabi, United Arab Emirates
15	Brave CF 15: Colombia	September 7, 2018	Coliseo Bicentenario	Bucaramanga, Colombia
14	Brave CF 14: Azaitar vs. Kokora	August 18, 2018	Omnisports Indoor Club of Tangier	Tangier, Morocco
13	Brave CF 13: European Evolution	June 9, 2018	SSE Arena	Belfast, Northern Ireland
12	Brave CF 12: KHK Legacy	May 11, 2018	Balai Sarbini	Jakarta, Indonesia
11	Brave CF 11: Mineiro vs. Santiago	April 13, 2018	Mineirão	Belo Horizonte, Brazil
10	Brave CF 10: The Kingdom Rises	March 2, 2018	Prince Hamza Hall	Amman, Jordan
9	Brave CF 9: The Kingdom of Champions	November 17, 2017	Khalifa Sports City Stadium	Isa Town, Bahrain
8	Brave CF 8: The Rise of Champions	August 12, 2017	Almir Nelson de Almeida Gymnasium	Tarumã, Brazil
7	Brave CF 7: Untamed	July 29, 2017	Caliente Bullring	Tijuana, Mexico
6	Brave CF 6: Kazakhstan	April 29, 2017	Almaty Arena	Almaty, Kazakhstan
5	Brave CF 5: Go For Glory	April 23, 2017	Sardar Vallabhbhai Patel Indoor Stadium	Mumbai, India
4	Brave CF 4: Unstoppable	March 31, 2017	IPIC Arena	Abu Dhabi, United Arab Emirates
3	Brave CF 3: Battle in Brazil	March 18, 2017	Max Rosenmann Sports and Leisure Gymnasium	São José dos Pinhais, Brazil
2	Brave CF 2: Dynasty	December 2, 2016	Khalifa Sports City Stadium	Isa Town, Bahrain
1	Brave CF 1: The Beginning	September 23, 2016	Khalifa Sports City Stadium	Isa Town, Bahrain

=== Event locations ===
The following cities have hosted a total of 98 Brave CF events as of Brave CF 98

Bahrain (total: 25)
- Isa Town (13)
- Riffa (8)
- Arad (4)

Brazil (total: 5)

- Belo Horizonte (2)
- Curitiba (1)
- Fortaleza (1)
- São José dos Pinhais (1)

Slovenia (total: 5)

- Ljubljana (5)

Sweden (total: 4)

- Stockholm (4)

Colombia (total: 3)

- Bogotá (2)
- Bucaramanga (1)

India (total: 3)

- Mumbai (1)
- Hyderabad (2)

Indonesia (total: 3)

- Bali (1)
- Jakarta (2)

Kazakhstan (total: 3)

- Almaty (3)

Romania (total: 3)

- Bucharest (3)

United Arab Emirates (total: 3)

- Abu Dhabi (3)

Bulgaria (total: 2)

- Burgas (2)

Germany (total: 2)

- Bonn (1)
- Düsseldorf (1)

Jordan (total: 2)

- Amman (2)

Netherlands (total: 2)

- Alkmaar (2)

Pakistan (total: 2)

- Lahore (2)

Russia (total: 2)

- Rostov-on-Don (1)
- Sochi (1)

Saudi Arabia (total: 2)

- Jeddah (2)

Serbia (total: 2)

- Belgrade (2)

Spain (total: 3)

- Santa Cruz de Tenerife (3)

South Africa (total: 2)

- Durban (1)
- Sun City (1)

Uzbekistan (total: 2)

- Bukhara (2)

Switzerland (total: 1)

- Geneva (1)

Austria (total: 1)

- Vienna (1)

Belarus (total: 1)

- Minsk (1)

China (total: 1)

- Zhengzhou (2)

England (total: 1)

- London (1)

France (total: 1)

- Nantes (1)

Italy (total: 1)

- Milan (1)

Kyrgyzstan (total: 1)

- Bishkek (1)

Mauritius (total: 1)

- Saint Pierre (1)

Mexico (total: 1)

- Tijuana (1)

Morocco (total: 1)

- Tangier (1)

Northern Ireland (total: 1)

- Belfast (1)

Philippines (total: 1)

- Pasay (1)

Poland (total: 1)

- Konin (1)

South Korea (total: 1)

- Incheon (1)

== BRAVE Combat Federation records ==
Record	Fighter	Number
Most Bouts	(Lebanon) Mohammad Fakhreddine	12
Most Wins	(Jordan) Jarrah Al-Silawi	10
Most Total Fight Time	(Bahrain) Hamza Kooheji	144m17s
Most Knockouts	(Lebanon) Mohammad Fakhreddine	7
Fastest Knockout	(Bahrain) Ramazan Gitinov	0:08
Most Submissions	(France) Elias Boudegzdame	4
Fastest Submission	(Uzbekistan) Mashrabjon Ruziboev	0:18

== Broadcast ==
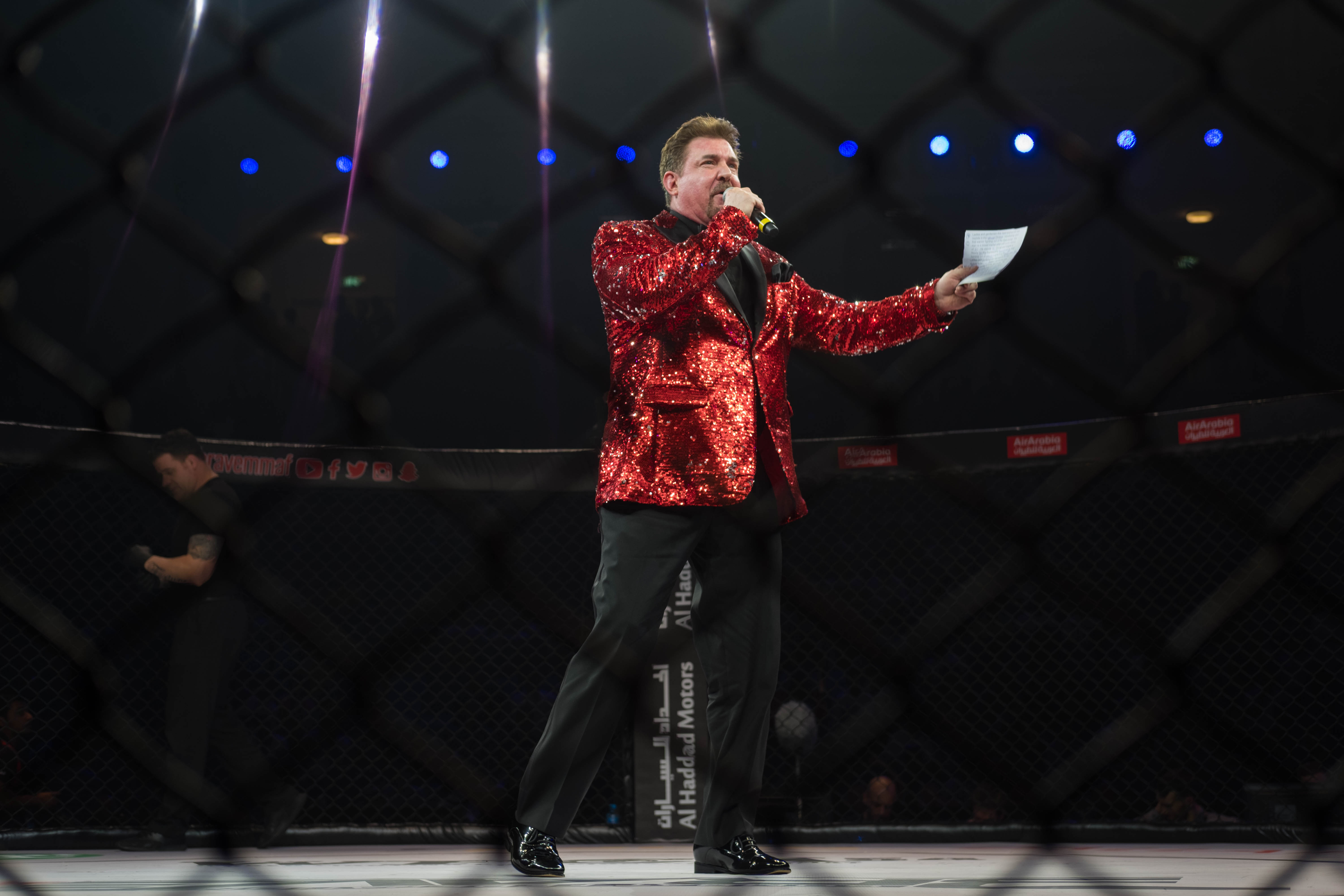
Cage Announcer, Carlos Kremer during BRAVE CF 18

=== Talents ===
- Cyrus Fees: Play-by-play commentator
- Frankie Edgar: Color Commentator
- Nate Quarry: Color Commentator
- Alex Soto: Color Commentator
- Phil Campbell: Color Commentator
- Carlos Kremer: Cage announcer
- Cris Cyborg: Guest commentator
- Noel O'Keefe
- Kirik Jenness

=== Broadcast Talent ===
The BRAVE Combat Federation broadcast team consists of Phil Campbell, Kirik Jenness, and Carlos Kremer. Kremer has been the promotion’s official cage announcer since BRAVE CF 1, making him one of the longest-serving on-air figures in the organization’s history. In recognition of his contributions, he was inducted into the BRAVE CF Hall of Fame during BRAVE CF 100, becoming the first cage announcer to receive this honor.

==== Phil Campbell ====
Philip Laurence Campbell (born 9 October 1988) is an Irish broadcaster and former combat sports athlete who serves as one of BRAVE CF’s color commentators. Campbell was raised in the town of Larne in County Antrim and educated at Garron Tower College before earning an honours degree in Criminology and Criminal Justice from the University of Ulster. Prior to his broadcasting career, he competed in multiple combat sports, becoming an Irish National MMA Champion as well as an Irish National Bare-Knuckle Boxing Champion. His background as a fighter has contributed to his analytical style and technical breakdowns during BRAVE CF broadcasts.

==== Kirik Jenness ====
Kirik Jenness, a long-time figure within the global mixed martial arts community, joined BRAVE CF’s broadcast team as an analyst. Jenness is known for his role as the official keeper of MMA records under the Muhammad Ali Boxing Reform Act in the United States, as well as for providing expert commentary for events in more than 30 countries. In 2022, he received the World MMA Awards Lifetime Achievement Award, recognizing decades of contributions to the sport.

==== Carlos Kremer ====
Carlos Kremer serves as BRAVE CF’s official cage announcer and has been part of the promotion since BRAVE CF 1. A former U.S. Marine Corps Captain and media personality, Kremer has become one of the longest-serving voices of the organization. In 2025, during BRAVE CF 100, he was inducted into the BRAVE CF Hall of Fame, becoming the first cage announcer to receive this distinction. Kremer graduated from UC Davis and played Collegiate Football before serving as a US Marine Corps Captain and recipient of Two Navy Achievement Medals for Honor and Valor. He was the only Marine out of 42 Marines to escape SERE School ( Survival, Evasion, Resistance and Escape), and was selected to lead Marine Boot Camp at MCRD. He was also inducted to the Hall of Fame of the USA Martial Arts in the class of 2024. Kremer is married to Teca Kremer and has two children.

=== TV partners ===
- Bahrain Radio and Television Corporation
- OSN Sports
- El Rey Network
- Abu Dhabi Sports
- Combate
- Myx TV
- S+A
- ESPN 5
- MTV India
- Fite TV
- Polsat Sport

== BRAVE TV & BRAVE Films ==
Poster of SMILE

BRAVE Combat Federation announced the initiation of operations of their subsidiary film production unit named BRAVE Films. To commence operations the film production unit produced the television documentary-drama "SMILE" on 26 June during Eid. In 2024, BRAVE CF produced two documentaries, sharing the narratives of Hamza Kooheji (Bahrain) and Muhammad Mokaev (United Kingdom).

BRAVE TV: BRAVE Combat Federation announced last year the creation of BRAVE TV, an online subscription service in which fans would be able to watch live events, as well as reruns of old shows. BRAVE 23 was available on the newly formed online streaming platform to fans from all over the world, except for those territories contemplated with preexisting TV deals.

SMILE: The short film narrates the story of the featherweight champion of BRAVE Combat Federation and behind the scenes of his training leading to the championship bout. The content was shot extensively in Montpellier, France and Tijuana, Mexico apart from locations in Bahrain and in Abu Dhabi, United Arab Emirates. The initiative was publicized to popularise mixed martial arts and to showcase the lifestyle of fighters and marks the launch of "BRAVE Films", a film production segment by BRAVE Combat Federation.

The Untold Story Hamza Kooheji: The documentary premiered focusing on the career of Bahraini MMA fighter Hamza Kooheji.

Beyond the UFC: An Inside Look at BRAVE CF 91: The documentary, directed by MMA filmmaker Will Harris provides an inside look at Muhammad Mokaev's return to BRAVE CF at BRAVE CF 91 and offers a behind-the-scenes perspective on Mokaev's training at KHK MMA.

== BRAVE International Combat Week ==
In February 2017, KHK MMA and IMMAF announced, a partnership which would see the Amateur World Championships move from Las Vegas to Bahrain for the first time. IMMAF president Kerrith Brown announced the shift for the world championships to move to Bahrain. In addition to the world championships, BRAVE president Mohammed "The Hawk" Shahid announced that the promotion would host a show in the same week as the World Championships. The first International Combat Week was held from November 12 to November 19, with BRAVE 9 taking place on November 17, featuring two title fights. Subsequently, Bahrain hosted the Amateur World Championships for 2018 and 2019.

== See also ==
- List of current Brave CF fighters
