= 2014 in Ultimate Warrior Challenge Mexico =

Information
- First date: May 17, 2014
- Last date: October 18, 2014

Events
- Total events: 2

Fights
- Total fights: 21
- Title fights: 2

The year 2014 was the six year in the history of Ultimate Warrior Challenge Mexico, a mixed martial arts promotion based in Mexico. In these year, UWC held 2 events.

== Events list ==
#	Event	Date	Venue	Location
1	UWC & EVT: Duarte vs. Beristaín	May 17, 2014	Auditorio Fausto Gutiérrez Moreno	Tijuana, Mexico
2	UWC & EVT: Sánchez vs. Castillo	October 18, 2014	ONIXEUS	Tijuana, Mexico

== UWC & EVT: Duarte vs. Beristaín ==
UWC & EVT: Duarte vs. Beristaín
- Promotion: Ultimate Warrior Challenge Mexico
- Date: May 17, 2014
- Venue: Auditorio Fausto Gutiérrez Moreno
- City: Tijuana, Mexico

Event chronology
UWC México: New Blood 2	UWC & EVT: Duarte vs. Beristaín	UWC & EVT: Sánchez vs. Castillo

UWC & EVT: Duarte vs. Beristaín was a mixed martial arts event held by Ultimate Warrior Challenge Mexico on May 17, 2014, at the Auditorio Fausto Gutiérrez Moreno in Tijuana, Mexico.

=== Background ===
The main event featured a UWC Bantamweight Championship fight between Marcos Beristaín and Antonio Duarte.

=== Results ===
Main card
Weight class				Method	Round	Time	Notes
Bantamweight	Antonio Duarte	def.	Marcos Beristaín	Submission (guillotine choke)	3	5:00	(Note: For the UWC Bantamweight Championship)
Bantamweight	Iván López	def.	Kevin Amador	Decision (unanimous)	2	1:46
Featherweight	Martin Bravo	def.	Jaime Flores	TKO (corner stoppage)	1	2:53
Bantamweight	Atiq Jihaid	def.	Miguel Rosales	TKO (elbows)	1	2:08
Bantamweight	Cristian Quiñónez	def.	Arnoldo Castillo	Submission (armbar)		0:00
Lightweight	Manuel Amor Sánchez	def.	David Trujillo	TKO (punches)	1	1:05
Featherweight	Raúl Coronado	def.	Keanu Fleming	TKO (punches)	1	0:12
Flyweight	Ernesto Galán	def.	Juan Rayo	Decision (unanimous)	3	5:00
Featherweight	Daniel Rincón	def.	Eduardo Alvarado	Decision (unanimous)	3	5:00
Featherweight	Alejandro Gíl	def.	Arturo Lemus	Submission (rear-naked choke)	3	2:34

== UWC & EVT: Sánchez vs. Castillo ==
UWC & EVT: Sánchez vs. Castillo
- Promotion: Ultimate Warrior Challenge Mexico
- Date: October 18, 2014
- Venue: ONXEUS
- City: Tijuana, Mexico

Event chronology
UWC & EVT: Duarte vs. Beristaín	UWC & EVT: Sánchez vs. Castillo	UWC Mexico 14: Bravo vs. Suruy

UWC & EVT: Sánchez vs. Castillo was a mixed martial arts event held by Ultimate Warrior Challenge Mexico on October 18, 2014, at the ONXEUS in Tijuana, Mexico.

=== Background ===
The main event featured a UWC Welterweight Championship fight between champion Jesús Sánchez and Iván Castillo.

=== Results ===
Main card
Weight class				Method	Round	Time	Notes
Welterweight	Iván Castillo	def.	Jesús Sánchez	Decision (majority)	3	5:00	(Note: For the UWC Welterweight Championship)
Lightweight	Edgar Escarrega	vs.	Manuel Amor Sánchez	Draw	3	5:00
Lightweight	José Ruelas	def.	Cristian Quiñónez	TKO (punches)	3	0:57
Featherweight	Armando Espejel	def.	Israel Farfan	Submission (guillotine choke)	2	0:52
Bantamweight	José Alday	def.	Alexis Ramos	Submission (rear-naked choke)	2	4:47
Featherweight	Eduardo Alvarado	def.	Arnoldo Castillo	Decision (unanimous)	3	5:00
Catchweight	Luis Zaragoza	def.	Daniel Luna	Decision (split)	2	5:00
Catchweight	Oscar Quintero	def.	Joaquín Balderas	Decision (split)	2	5:00
Catchweight	Iván Vásquez	def.	Jason García	TKO (punches)	1	3:07
Catchweight	Alfredo Moreno	def.	Juan Gonzales	Submission (neck crank)	1	2:40
Catchweight	Alexander Abad	def.	Even Jauregui	Submission (rear-naked choke)	1	2:54
