= Julio Cesar Neves Jr. =

Brazilian mixed martial artist

Julio Cesar Neves
- Born: Julio Cesar Neves Jr. 25 April 1994 (age 32); Balneário Camboriú, Lages, Brazil
- Other names: Morceguinho ("Little Bat")
- Height: 6 ft 1 in (1.85 m)
- Weight: 145 lb (66 kg)
- Division: Lightweight; Featherweight
- Reach: 74.0 in (188 cm)
- Style: Muay Thai, Luta Livre
- Fighting out of: Balneário Camboriú, Santa Catarina, Brazil
- Team: Astra Fight Team
- Trainer: Marcelo Brigadeiro
- Years active: 2011–present

Mixed martial arts record
- Total: 38
- Wins: 36
- By knockout: 20
- By submission: 10
- By decision: 6
- Losses: 2
- By submission: 1
- By decision: 1

Other information
- Mixed martial arts record from Sherdog

Julio Cesar Neves Jr. (born 25 April 1994) is a Brazilian mixed martial artist who competes in the featherweight division of Konfrontacja Sztuk Walki (KSW). He has previously fought in Bellator MMA.

== Background ==
Julio Cesar was born in Brazil. He achieved a coveted 30-0 record after defeating Poppies Martinez at Bellator 125, an unheard of accomplishment in mixed martial arts competition, given his age and the time span in which he competed.

== Mixed martial arts career ==
=== Early career ===
Neves had been competing in the Brazilian circuit since late-2011, amassing 28 bouts and early finishes in a very condensed period of time before signing with Bellator MMA. He was doing so at a very young age, being only 19-years-old when he was signed to Bellator. He was expected to face Yuri Maia at Golden Fighters 7 on 9 November 2013, but it was cancelled because of the subsequent signing to Bellator.

=== Bellator MMA ===
Neves made his Bellator debut on 18 April 2014 (just days before his 20th birthday) at Bellator 117 against Josh Arocho. The 19-year-old was successful in his debut, defeating Arocho in the second round via TKO.

In his second bout with the promotion, Neves faced Poppies Martinez on 19 September 2014 at Bellator 125. He won via TKO in the first round.

In his third bout with the promotion, Neves faced fellow up-and-comer Jordan Parsons at Bellator 137 on 15 May 2015. He lost the back and forth fight via submission in the third round. This marked the first professional defeat of his career.

In June 2015, it was revealed that Neves, along with his brother Rafael Silva, were among 8 fighters released from the promotion.

=== Criticism ===
Neves' record has been subject of controversy in his home country of Brazil. According to many local MMA resources and forums, Neves built his undefeated record facing mostly "cans" and opponents with irregular MMA records while avoiding tougher challengers. Some of his opponents' records, in order, are: 0-3, 0-2, 3-2, 0-2, 9-8, 4-3, 0-1, 2-3, 1-3, 1-1, 0-3, 1-7, 1-1, 0-2, 12-10 and 0-2.

=== Konfrontacja Sztuk Walki ===
Winning the next 6 bouts mostly on the Brazilian regional scene, Neves signed with Konfrontacja Sztuk Walki, making his debut against Daniel Rutkowski on March 16, 2024 at KSW 92. After a three-round fight, he lost to his rival unanimously on the scorecards, thus suffering the second defeat in his career.

== Mixed martial arts record ==
Professional record breakdown
39 matches	36 wins	3 losses
By knockout	20	0
By submission	10	2
By decision	6	1

Res.	Record	Opponent	Method	Event	Date	Round	Time	Location	Notes
Loss	36–3	Piotr Kacprzak	Submission (triangle choke)	KSW 102	January 25, 2025	3	2:19	Radom, Poland	
Loss	36–2	Daniel Rutkowski	Decision (unanimous)	KSW 92	16 March 2024	3	5:00	Gorzów Wielkopolski, Poland	
Win	36–1	Rafael Luiz de Almeida	TKO	Brusque MMA 4	12 December 2021	1	2:00	Brusque, Brazil	
Win	35–1	Kevin Park	Decision (unanimous)	Battlefield FC 2	27 July 2019	3	5:00	Macau SAR, China	
Win	34–1	Roger Sampaio	Submission (guillotine choke)	Aspera FC 57	9 September 2017	1	1:14	Florianópolis, Brazil	
Win	33–1	Fernando Colman	Decision (unanimous)	Brave CF 3	18 March 2017	3	5:00	São José dos Pinhais, Brazil	Catchweight (150 lb) bout.
Win	32–1	Carlisson Diego Santos	Submission (anaconda choke)	Smash Fight 4	28 October 2016	2	4:08	Curitiba, Brazil	
Win	31–1	Ranieri Zenidim	Decision (unanimous)	Aspera FC 40	18 June 2016	3	5:00	Balneário Camboriú, Brazil	
Loss	30–1	Jordan Parsons	Submission (arm-triangle choke)	Bellator 137	15 May 2015	3	4:09	Temecula, California, United States	
Win	30–0	Poppies Martinez	TKO (spinning back kick and punches)	Bellator 125	19 September 2014	1	2:16	Fresno, California, United States	
Win	29–0	Josh Arocho	TKO (elbows and punches)	Bellator 117	18 April 2014	2	2:37	Council Bluffs, Iowa, United States	Catchweight (149 lb) bout; Arocho missed weight.
Win	28–0	Nelson Junior	Submission (rear-naked choke)	Sparta MMA 9	15 September 2013	1	0:57	Itajaí, Brazil	
Win	27–0	Maikon Jonathan de Carvalho	Decision (unanimous)	Sparta MMA 8	24 August 2013	3	5:00	Balneário Camboriú, Brazil	
Win	26–0	Dener dos Santos	KO (head kick)	Watch Out Combat Show 28	10 August 2013	1	2:42	Gramado, Brazil	
Win	25–0	Hamilton Ferreira	TKO (punches)	Watch Out Combat Show 26	24 May 2013	1	1:50	Itajaí, Brazil	
Win	24–0	Renato Gabardi	Submission (rear-naked choke)	Island FC 1	26 April 2013	2	4:47	Palhoça, Brazil	
Win	23–0	Alex de Souza	TKO (punches)	Sparta MMA 5	20 April 2013	1	0:36	Balneário Camboriú, Brazil	
Win	22–0	Kaique Silva	Submission (arm-triangle choke)	Nocaute Fight Champion	13 April 2013	2	2:18	Curitibanos, Brazil	
Win	21–0	Danilo Santos	TKO (head kick)	BingoFight 1	22 March 2013	2	2:11	Blumenau, Brazil	
Win	20–0	Mauricio Machado	KO (flying knee)	Sparta MMA 4	16 March 2013	1	0:37	Itajaí, Brazil	
Win	19–0	Tiago Esquilo	TKO (punches)	CTA Combat: MMA & Muay Thai	9 March 2013	1	1:08	Palmeira das Missões, Brazil	
Win	18–0	Kelvin Kuster	TKO (punches)	Sparta MMA 3	23 February 2013	2	2:10	Balneário Camboriú, Brazil	
Win	17–0	Ramones Silva	TKO (punches)	Tavares Combat 5	16 February 2013	1	2:47	Jaguaruna, Brazil	
Win	16–0	Rafael Bixão	Submission (rear-naked choke)	Tavares Combat 4	3 February 2013	1	3:26	Antônio Carlos, Brazil	
Win	15–0	Vitor Miranda	KO (head kick)	Tavares Combat 2	24 January 2013	1	2:34	Itajaí, Brazil	
Win	14–0	Maicon Silva	KO (flying knee)	Sparta MMA: Sparta Qualify 1	12 January 2013	1	3:14	Itajaí, Brazil	
Win	13–0	Joao Capoeira	KO (punch)	Corupá Fight Champion 1	22 December 2012	1	3:37	Corupá, Brazil	
Win	12–0	Guilherme Alves Nascimento	Submission (armbar)	Tavares Combat 1	8 December 2012	1	N/A	Palhoça, Brazil	
Win	11–0	Guilherme Severo	Decision (unanimous)	Golden Fighters 4	1 December 2012	3	5:00	Novo Hamburgo, Brazil	
Win	10–0	Antonio Nelson Magalhães Bezerra	KO (flying knee)	Soul Fight Night 1	11 August 2012	2	3:11	Pirabeiraba, Brazil	
Win	9–0	Luiz André Valentim	TKO (punches)	Soul Fight Night 1	11 August 2012	1	1:16	Pirabeiraba, Brazil	
Win	8–0	Gustavo Mendonca	KO (flying knee)	Connect Fight Night 2	17 June 2012	2	1:16	Biguaçu, Brazil	
Win	7–0	Fernando Giacometti	Submission (rear-naked choke)	Energy Force 1	19 May 2012	1	1:50	Navegantes, Brazil	
Win	6–0	Lucas Moraes	TKO (elbows)	Connect Fight Night 1	31 March 2012	3	3:04	Balneário Camboriú, Brazil	
Win	5–0	Jonathan Giocomossi	Submission (arm-triangle choke)	Blufight MMA 2	10 March 2012	1	3:10	Blumenau, Brazil	
Win	4–0	Apostolis Andrade Halianis	Decision (unanimous)	Nitrix Champion Fight 10	11 February 2012	3	5:00	Camboriu, Brazil	
Win	3–0	Renato Monaco	Submission (rear-naked choke)	Blufight MMA 1	3 December 2011	1	1:57	Blumenau, Brazil	
Win	2–0	Fabio Japones	KO (flying knee)	Federation of Paulista Mixed Martial Arts: Combat 2	13 November 2011	1	2:17	São Caetano do Sul, Brazil	
Win	1–0	Maicon Gregor	KO (flying knee)	Octagon MMA 1	1 October 2011	1	4:12	Itajaí, Brazil	Featherweight debut.
