= Eye of the Beholder (TV series) =

- Country of origin: Canada
- Original language: English
- No. of episodes: 6

Production
- Producer: Rick Campbell

Original release
- Network: CBC Television
- Release: 9 September – 20 September 1974

Eye of the Beholder is a Canadian travel documentary television miniseries that aired on CBC Television in 1974.

== Premise ==
This series featured scenes from such nations as Brazil, Hong Kong, Peru, Spain and Thailand.

== Scheduling ==
This half-hour series was broadcast Mondays, Wednesdays and Fridays at 4:30 p.m. (Eastern) from 9 to 20 September 1974. It was rebroadcast weekdays at 4:30 p.m. from 15 to 30 September 1977.
