= Desert Force Championship =

Mixed martial arts promoter based in Jordan

Desert Force MMA Championship
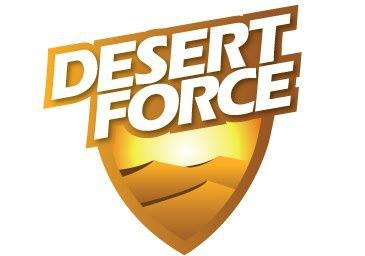
- Company type: Private
- Industry: Mixed martial arts promotion
- Founded: October 10, 2010
- Founder: Zaid Mirza, Mohammad Mirza, Zaid Abu-Soud
- Headquarters: Amman, Jordan
- Parent: X-Sports Management, LLC

Desert Force Championship (DFC) was a mixed martial arts promotion company in the Arab world, which held most of the top-ranked Arab MMA fighters in the region. The championship has held ten televised events and presided over approximately 100 matches. DFC currently airs on MBC Action on a bi-monthly basis. In 2010 Desert Force launched the “Elimination Series”, a single-elimination tournament for Arab MMA fighters competing to become the first regional MMA title belt holders in 7 respective weight classes. Fighters from across the Middle East have competed in 7 weight classes, namely Bantamweights, Featherweights, Lightweights, Welterweights, Middleweights, Light-Heavyweights and Heavyweights; each class enforcing the Unified Rules of Mixed Martial Arts. Participating countries include: KSA, United Arab Emirates, Qatar, Kuwait, Jordan, Iraq, Bahrain, Palestine, Syria, Lebanon, Egypt, Morocco, Tunisia. In recent years DFC fights have been officially refereed by MMA referee Yves Lavigne.

== Current champions ==
Division	Upper weight limit	Champion	Since	Title defenses
Bantamweight	61 kg (134.5 lb)	(Jordan) Nawras Abzakh	September 5, 2016 (Desert Force 24)	0
Middleweight	84 kg (185.2 lb)	(Lebanon) Mohammed Karaki	December 7, 2015 (Desert Force 19)	0
Welterweight	77 kg (169.8 lb)	(Tunisia) Mounir Lazzez	March 23, 2015 (Desert Force 16)	0
Lightweight	70 kg (154.3 lb)	(Morocco) Mohammed Treki	March 23, 2015 (Desert Force 16)	0
Featherweight	66 kg (145.5 lb)	(Saudi Arabia) Aziz Julaidan	December 15, 2014 (Desert Force 14 - Al Academiya 2 Finale)	0
Welterweight	77 kg (169.8 lb)	(Lebanon) Ahmed Labban	November 15, 1991 (Desert Force 15 - Al Academiya 3 Finale)	0

== Events ==
Country	Event title	Location	Date
Egypt	Desert Force 19 - Egypt	Shooting Club Stadium, Cairo	2015-12-07
Lebanon	Desert Force 18 - Lebanon	Ghazir Stadium, BEIRUT	2015-08-18
Jordan	Desert Force 17 - Homecoming	Al-Hussein Youth City Boxing Arena - Amman	2015-05-25
Saudi Arabia	Desert Force 16 - Saudi Arabia	Green Halls - Riyadh	2015-03-23
(United Arab Emirates) UAE	Desert Force 15 - Abu Dhabi	FGB Arena	2015-02-09
Saudi Arabia	Desert Force 14 - Al Academiya 2 Finale	KSA Venue Jeddah	2014-12-15
(United Arab Emirates) UAE	Desert Force 13 - Abu Dhabi	FGB Arena	2014-08-25
Jordan	Desert Force 12	Al-Hussein Youth City Boxing Arena - Amman	2014-04-28
Bahrain	Desert Force 11 Bahrain	Khalifa Sports City Arena, Manama	2014-03-07
Jordan	Desert Force 10 - Al Academiya Finale	Al-Hussein Youth City Boxing Arena - Amman	2014-01-27
(United Arab Emirates) UAE	Desert Force Dubai	AUD Knights Arena	2013-10-17
Jordan	Desert Force - 2013 Grand Prix Finals	Al-Hussein Youth City Boxing Arena -Amman	2013-06-15
Jordan	Desert Force - 2013 Grand Prix Semifinals	Al-Hussein Youth City Boxing Arena - Amman	2013-03-07
Jordan	Desert Force - Round 2 on MBC Action	Al-Hussein Youth City Boxing Arena - Amman	2012-12-14
Jordan	DFC - Desert Force 5	Amman National Orthodox Club Gymnasium	2012-09-07
Jordan	Desert Force 4 - Middle East Grand Prix	Amman National Orthodox Club Gymnasium	2012-03-30
Jordan	Desert Force 3 - Elimination Series: Knockout Round	Amman National Orthodox Club Gymnasium	2010-09-30
Jordan	DFC - Desert Force 2	Amman National Orthodox Club Gymnasium	2011-05-19
Jordan	DFC - Desert Force 1	Amman National Orthodox Club Gymnasium	2010-09-08

=== Weight divisions ===
Weight class name	Upper limit	
Weight class name	in pounds (lb)	in kilograms (kg)
Bantamweight	135 lb	61 kg
Featherweight	145 lb	66 kg
Lightweight	155 lb	70 kg
Welterweight	170 lb	77 kg
Middleweight	185 lb	84 kg
Light Heavyweight	205 lb	93 kg
Heavyweight	265 lb	120 kg

== Desert Force Academy ==
The Desert Force Academy is a 13 episode reality TV series that started airing in November 2013 on MBC Action. The series follows the lives of 16 amateur Arab MMA fighters training and fighting for a chance to hold the Desert Force title for their respective weight.

In the second season there was a big change and surprises in the fighters test, before it was only organize matches between fighters and the winner get the opportunity to participate. But in the second season they will train the fighters in military base for five days and who will survive will participate.
