= Cyrus Fees =

American sports announcer (born 1982)

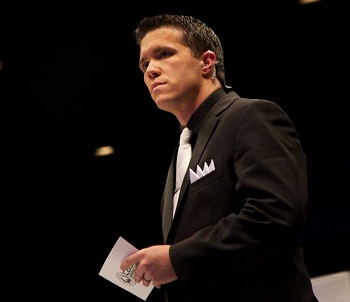
- Fees ring announcing for CWFC, 2013
- Born: Cyrus John Fees; March 15, 1982 (age 44); Des Moines, Iowa, United States
- Other names: Mr. International, Mr. 100
- Education: Tusculum College (BS); Iowa Central Community College (AA)
- Occupations: Ring announcer Sports commentator
- Employer: BKFC (2022–present)
- Spouse: Kayla Fees (m. 2009)
- Children: 2

Cyrus Fees (born March 15, 1982) is an American ring announcer and sports commentator currently working as the on-air host for Bare Knuckle Fighting Championship (BKFC).

Fees previously did commentary for promotions including Real American Freestyle (RAF), Eagle Fighting Championship (EFC), Xtreme Fighting Championships (XFC), Fight Nights Global (FNG), Brave Combat Federation (BRAVE), Global Force Wrestling (GFW), Superkombat Fighting Championship (SK), Australian Fighting Championship (AFC), and NWA Smoky Mountain. He previously worked as ring announcer for promotions including Jim Crockett Promotions (JCP), Dana White's Contender Series (DWCS), National Wrestling Alliance (NWA), Cage Warriors Fighting Championship (CWFC), and UAE Warriors.

He currently serves as President of the Rotary club of Johnson City, Tennessee.

== Early life and education ==
Cyrus John Fees was born on March 15, 1982, in Des Moines, Iowa to John and Deana Fees.

Fees began his broadcasting career working for the campus radio station KICB as a student of Iowa Central Community College.

He later worked as a disc jockey for WXIS while majoring in mass communication at Tusculum University, hosting the station’s hip-hop programming.

== Career ==
Fees worked as a news anchor for WKPT-TV from 2010 to 2012.

He began his sports broadcasting career by doing both ring announcing and commentary for NWA Smoky Mountain.

Fees co-hosted and produced MMA: Inside The Cage with Casey Oxendine, which was broadcast on Fight Now TV, Tuff TV, and YouTube from 2010 to 2014. Fees and Oxendine were both hired as commentators for Australian Fighting Championship (AFC) in December 2012.

He was hired as ring announcer and commentator for Superkombat Fighting Championship (SK) in September 2013.

Fees and Casey Oxendine purchased the Russian 2-on-2 mixed martial arts promotion Hip Show in 2014 and attempted to relaunch it in the United States.

He was hired as ring announcer for UAE Warriors in March 2015.

Fees was hired as lead play-by-play commentator for Global Force Wrestling (GFW) in July 2015.

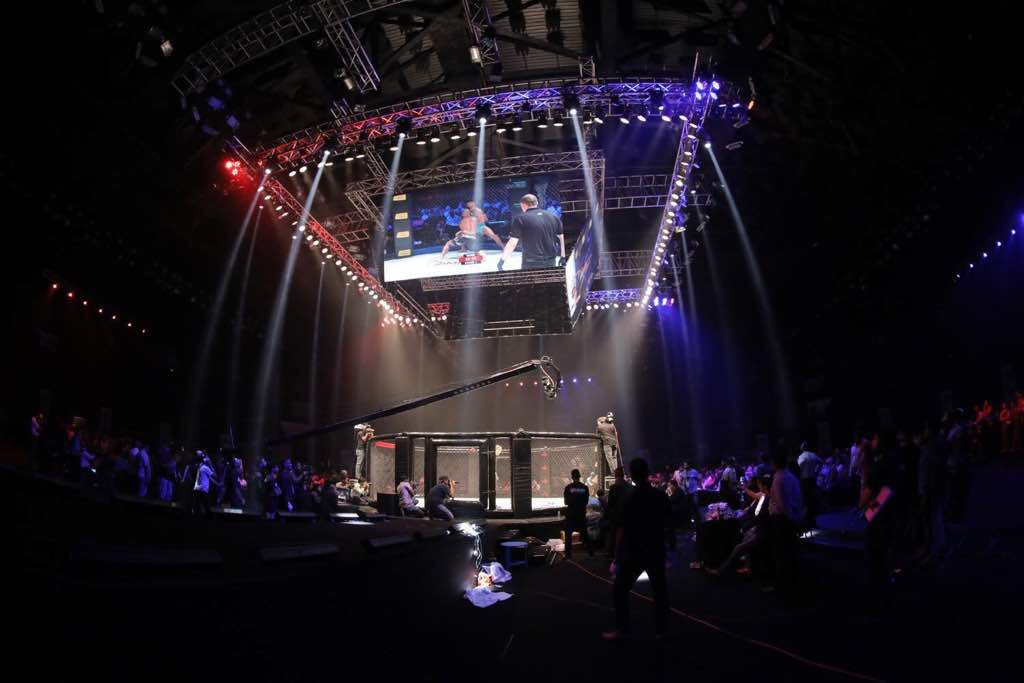
Brave 1: The Beginning, September 2016

He debuted as lead play-by-play commentator for Brave Combat Federation (BRAVE) at Brave 1: The Beginning in September 2016.

Fees was hired as lead play-by-play commentator for Fight Nights Global (FNG) in January 2018.

He was hired as ring announcer for National Wrestling Alliance (NWA) in October 2018.

Fees was hired as lead play-by-play commentator for Xtreme Fighting Championships (XFC) in March 2021.

He was hired as ring announcer for Dana White's Contender Series (DWCS) in October 2021.

Fees was hired as lead play-by-play commentator for Eagle Fighting Championship (EFC) in December 2021 prior to their first American events.

He was hired as on-air host and post-fight interviewer by Bare Knuckle Fighting Championship (BKFC) in January 2022.

Fees worked for Jim Crockett Promotions (JCP) as ring announcer for the undercard of Ric Flair's Last Match in July 2022.

He debuted as lead play-by-play commentator for Real American Freestyle (RAF) at RAF 03 in November 2025.

== Personal life ==
Fees is married to his wife Kayla, a registered nurse. They have two children and reside in Kingsport, Tennessee.

He currently serves as president of the Rotary club of Johnson City, Tennessee.

Fees has owned and operated the Vision Quest VR video arcade in Johnson City since 2019.

He appeared a contestant on the game show 25 Words or Less in January 2025. In November 2025, he appeared as a contestant on the game show Flip Side with fellow Tusculum University alumnus Keddrain Bowen.
