= Bahrain Radio and Television Corporation =

Public broadcaster in Bahrain

تلفزيون البحرين Bahrain Radio and Television Corporation
- Type: Government-owned corporation
- Founded: 1971; 55 years ago
- Headquarters: Manama, Bahrain
- Owner: Government of Bahrain
- Website: www.mia.gov.bh www.bna.bh/Index.aspx

Bahrain Radio and Television Corporation (BRTC; Arabic: تلفزيون البحرين, romanized: Tilifizyūn al-Baḥrayn) is a public broadcaster in Bahrain with headquarters in Manama. The BRTC is owned by the government of Bahrain, and under the control of the Information Affairs Authority.

== History ==
BRTC was set up in 1971, and became an independent body in January 1993. The corporation regulates visual and audio broadcasting in the Kingdom of Bahrain. It broadcasts programs in both Arabic and English.

== Radio Bahrain ==
Radio Bahrain was established in 1955, was taken over by BRTC in 1971, and became an independent body in 1993. Its English-language radio service has been on-air since 1977, broadcasting four hours a day from a studio in Isa Town. In 1982 the station was moved to a building in Adliya. On-air time was extended to 18 hours a day. A second station, Radio 2, began broadcasting 6 hours a day. In 1989 a new studio was established in the Ministry of Information building, and the following year the station went 24 hours. In 2007 Radio Bahrain switched its frequency from 101.0FM to 96.5FM.

== Bahrain TV ==
Bahrain TV was formed in 1973 by an American company (RTV International) with limited equipment. The government bought the station in 1975 and improved its facilities. A second channel (Channel 55) opened in December 1981. BTV has produced many Bahraini-created and produced shows, the most prominent being youth shows such as Chat with Batelco, and Hala Bahrain. Bahrain TV was criticised for the way it handled the 2011 Bahrain uprising, during which it ran a campaign to name, punish and shame those who took part in the uprising.

== Programs ==
=== Former ===
==== Imported shows ====
===== Animated shows =====
- The Adventures of Blinky Bill
- The Adventures of Dawdle the Donkey
- The Adventures of Hutch the Honeybee
- The Adventures of Marco & Gina
- Adventures of Pow Wow
- Adventures of Sonic the Hedgehog
- The Adventures of Tintin
- Aladdin
- The All New Popeye Hour
- The Animals of Farthing Wood
- Animaniacs
- Animated Classics
- Arthur
- Atom Ant
- Avenger Penguins
- Babar
- The Baby Huey Show
- Basket Fever
- Batman: The Animated Series
- Beast Wars: Transformers
- Biker Mice from Mars
- Billy the Cat
- Bionic Six
- Blazing Dragons
- Bob the Builder
- Budgie the Little Helicopter
- Cadillacs and Dinosaurs
- Captain Cook's Travels
- Captain Planet and the Planeteers
- Captain Simian and the Space Monkeys
- Casper the Friendly Ghost
- Crocadoo
- Dennis and Gnasher
- Dog City
- Double Dragon
- Dragon Tales
- DuckTales
- The Enchanted House
- Fables of the Green Forest
- Ferdy the Ant
- Flash Gordon
- Franklin
- Freakazoid!
- Gargoyles
- Goof Troop
- G.I. Joe
- Heathcliff and the Catillac Cats
- Hey Arnold!
- The Hot Rod Dogs and Cool Car Cats
- Jamie and the Magic Torch
- Karlsson-on-the-Roof
- Laurel and Hardy
- Little Bear
- Looney Tunes/Merrie Melodies
- The Magic School Bus
- Marsupilami
- The Mask: Animated Series
- Mighty Ducks: The Animated Series
- Molly's Gang
- Mortal Kombat: Defenders of the Realm
- The Mozart Band
- Mr. Bogus
- The New Adventures of Jonny Quest
- Noddy's Toyland Adventures
- Oscar and Friends
- The Pink Panther
- Pinky and the Brain
- Pippi Longstocking
- ProStars
- Popeye the Sailor Man
- Postman Pat
- The Prince of Atlantis
- The Raggy Dolls
- ReBoot
- Renada
- Road Rovers
- Rugrats
- Rupert
- Salty's Lighthouse
- The Secret Lives of Waldo Kitty
- Spider-Woman
- Spirou
- Street Sharks
- Stone Protectors
- SWAT Kats: The Radical Squadron
- TaleSpin
- Tayo the Little Bus
- Teo
- Tiny Toon Adventures
- Tom and Jerry
- Topper’s Tales
- The Transformers
- Voltron
- Where's Wally?
- Widget
- Wild West C.O.W.-Boys of Moo Mesa
- The Woody Woodpecker Show
- X-Men: Evolution

===== Documentary =====
- Across the Seven Seas
- The Ascent of Man
- Big Cat Diary
- Deadly Australians
- Eye of the Beholder
- Great Railway Journeys
- Insectia
- Pioneers of Egyptology
- Untamed World
- Walking with Dinosaurs
- Wonders of Weather

===== Game shows =====
- The Crystal Maze
- Wheel of Fortune

===== Children =====
- The Adventures of Shirley Holmes
- The Adventures of the Aftermath Crew
- Alphabet Castle
- Animal Park
- Animal Tales
- Art Attack
- At the Zoo
- Back to Sherwood
- Bananas in Pyjamas
- Barney & Friends
- Bear in the Big Blue House
- Big Bag
- Big Blue Marble
- Blue's Clues
- Brum
- Camp Wilderness
- Cappelli & Company
- Captain Power and the Soldiers of the Future
- Children of Fire Mountain
- Children's Film Foundation Films
- Don't Blame the Koalas
- Finger Tips
- Fudge
- Fun House
- Ghostwriter
- Glad Rags
- Goosebumps
- Groundling Marsh
- Huckleberry Finn and His Friends
- Jay Jay the Jet Plane
- The Latchkey Children
- Lift Off
- Lizzie McGuire
- McDuff, the Talking Dog
- The Mechanical Universe
- Mentors
- Mirror, Mirror
- Mowgli: The New Adventures of the Jungle Book
- My Best Friend is an Alien
- My Secret Identity
- The New Ghostwriter Mysteries
- Ocean Girl
- Pappyland
- Pardon My Genie
- Secret Life of Toys
- The Secret World of Alex Mack
- Sesame Street
- Spellbinder: Land of the Dragon Lord
- So You Want to Be
- Take Hart
- Take Off
- Theodore Tugboat
- Thomas The Tank Engine & Friends
- The Wayne Manifesto
- The Wonderful World of Brother Buzz
- Woobinda (Animal Doctor)
- You and Me

===== Comedy =====
- 3rd Rock from the Sun
- ALF
- America's Funniest Home Videos
- Baby Boom
- Batman
- Beadle's About
- Boy Meets World
- Brotherly Love
- B. J. and the Bear
- Café Americain
- Candid Camera
- Coach
- Dad's Army
- Diff'rent Strokes
- Dinosaurs
- The Double Life of Henry Phyfe
- Empty Nest
- Everybody Loves Raymond
- Family Matters
- Family Ties
- Fay
- The Fresh Prince of Bel-Air
- Friends
- The Golden Girls
- Good Time Harry
- Grace Under Fire
- Green Acres
- The Gregory Hines Show
- Growing Pains
- Harper Valley PTA
- The Hogan Family
- The Jeff Foxworthy Show
- Joey
- Just for Laughs Gags
- The King of Queens
- Mad About You
- The Misadventures of Sheriff Lobo
- Mind Your Language
- Newhart
- A Sharp Intake of Breath
- Sister, Sister
- Sledge Hammer!
- Smart Guy
- Some Mothers Do 'Ave 'Em
- Spin City
- The Tony Randall Show

===== Cooking =====
- Bake with Anna Olson
- Huey's Cooking Adventures
- Let's Bake and Decorate

===== Drama =====
- 240-Robert
- The Adventures of Sinbad
- The Adventures of Swiss Family Robinson
- Airwolf
- Armchair Thriller
- Automan
- The A-Team
- Bailey's Bird
- Battlestar Galactica
- Buck Rogers in the 25th Century
- Buffalo Girls
- Buffy the Vampire Slayer
- Delvecchio
- Dickens of London
- Doctor Who
- Dr. Quinn, Medicine Woman
- The Duchess of Duke Street
- Due South
- The Eddie Capra Mysteries
- Ellery Queen
- Emergency!
- Enemy at the Door
- A Family at War
- Fast Track
- First Wave
- F/X: The Series
- Griff
- Hawaii Five-O
- Helen: A Woman of Today
- Hercules: The Legendary Journeys
- Hill Street Blues
- The Incredible Hulk
- Jake and the Fatman
- Judging Amy
- Katts and Dog
- Knight Rider
- The Legend of William Tell
- Lois & Clark: The New Adventures of Superman
- Lou Grant
- L.A. Heat
- Magnum, P.I.
- Manimal
- A Man Called Sloane
- Martial Law
- Moloney
- Moonlighting
- Murder One
- M.A.N.T.I.S.
- The Nancy Drew/Hardy Boys Mysteries
- New York Undercover
- Perry Mason
- Pit Pony
- Police Rescue
- Pride and Prejudice
- The Rockford Files
- Sapphire & Steel
- Shannon
- Simon & Simon
- Sirens
- The Six Billion Dollar Man
- Sliders
- The Sopranos
- Star Trek: The Next Generation
- Starsky & Hutch
- Street Hawk
- Superboy
- Sword of Justice
- Team Knight Rider
- Upstairs, Downstairs
- Viper
- Walker, Texas Ranger
- Water Rats
- Wildside
- Xena: Warrior Princess
- The X-Files
- Young Ramsay
- Zorro

===== Wrestling =====
- WWF Superstars of Wrestling

===== Biographical =====
- George Washington

===== Sports =====
- Trans World Sport

===== Horror =====
- Werewolf

===== Magazine =====
- Cybernet
- Martha Stewart Living

===== Reality =====
- Candid Camera
- Healthy, Wealthy and Wise
- Man vs. Wild

===== Education =====
- Beyond 2000
- Science International

===== Western =====
- The Adventures of Brisco County, Jr.
- Dusty's Trail

===== Soap Opera =====
- The Colbys
- Dallas
- Dynasty
- Falcon Crest
- Knots Landing
- The Young Doctors

===== Talk Shows =====
- The Oprah Winfrey Show

== See also ==
- Media in Bahrain
- Information Affairs Authority
