= Konfrontacja Sztuk Walki =

MMA promoter based in Poland

- Current season, competition or edition: 2026 in Konfrontacja Sztuk Walki
- Sport: Mixed martial arts promotion
- Founded: 2004; 22 years ago
- Founder: Martin Lewandowski; Maciej Kawulski
- Owner: Private
- Country: Poland
- Headquarters: Warsaw, Poland
- Website: www.kswmma.com

Konfrontacja Sztuk Walki (English: Martial Arts Confrontation), better known by its initials KSW, is widely considered to be the premier mixed martial arts organization in Poland and one of the leading in Europe.

== Awards ==
- Violent Money TV
  - VMTV European Promotion of the Year 2022

== History ==
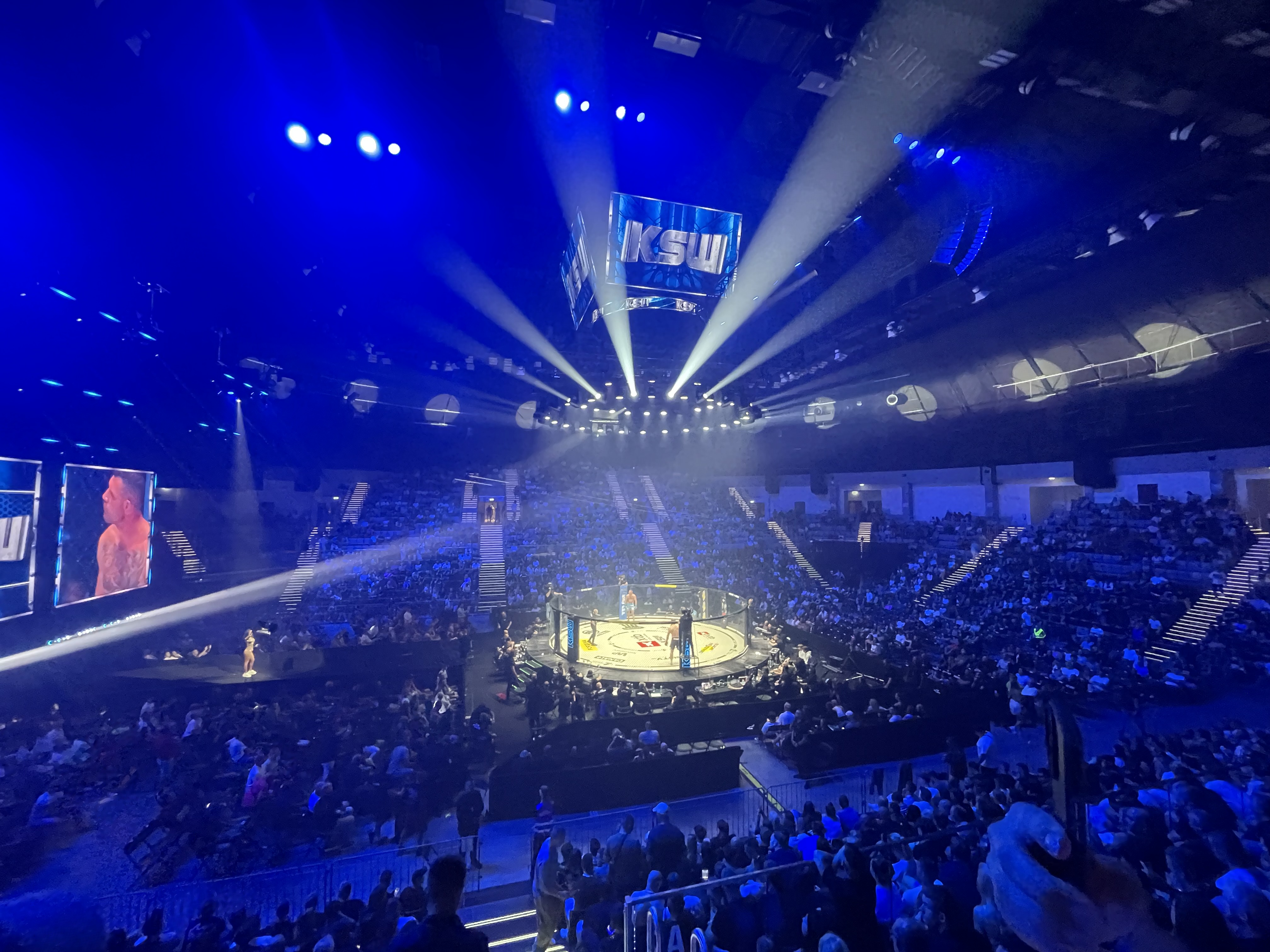
The cage during XTB KSW 108

Martin Lewandowski had been the manager of the Hotel Marriott in Warsaw when he met Maciej Kawulski in 2002. Kawulski was organizing one of the biggest sports expos in Poland at that time, and as both businessmen come from martial arts backgrounds, they quickly found a common subject. Eighteen months later the first KSW show was born.

The promotion is famed for its four and eight-man tournaments, which until KSW X - Dekalog took place over the period of one night, but since KSW XI they are split, with the tournament final taking place on the next event. KSW XV is the first event without a new tournament, only with extra fights and finals from previous tournaments.

Different from other bigger promotions such as the UFC, KSW adopted the strategy of having events that are less frequent but bigger, focusing on creating big shows with stacked cards and with great spectacle. In 2017, KSW 39: Colosseum beat the record for the largest live attendance to a MMA event in Europe, and second-largest in history with 57,776 fans, only after the Pride Shockwave in 2002 and ahead of UFC 193.

Several fighters who have been successful in KSW have signed on to more well known promotions such as the UFC. KSW has its own fight team, the KSW Team, which consists of some of the promotion's elite fighters, such as Mamed Khalidov, Jan Błachowicz, Krzysztof Kulak, Łukasz Jurkowski or Antoni Chmielewski. KSW co-operates with many other promotions in Europe by exchanging fighters, for example WFC and The Cage. KSW runs the majority of its shows live on a variety of TV networks (Polsat Sport, Polsat Sport Extra) throughout Europe. Since KSW XI, the promotion runs its shows live on nationally available at private free-to-air television network Polsat.

=== Viaplay era ===
On November 22, 2021, KSW announced a long-term partnership with streaming platform Viaplay. Contract includes increasing number of KSW events to 12 per year and exclusive rights to Viaplay to broadcast KSW events on its platform for the Polish, Nordic, Scandinavian, Dutch and English markets.

=== Cooperation with XTB ===
In October 2022, it was announced that as part of the extension of cooperation with XTB - one of the largest Polish fintechs offering its own investment platform, a new agreement was concluded, in which XTB will become the title sponsor of the KSW gala in 2023. The agreement is concluded for the entire year 2023 and will be valid for ten out of twelve planned galas, of which six of these events will be called XTB KSW. In other cases, XTB will be a strategic sponsor, just like in 2022 - at galas in Łódź, Toruń, Radom and Warsaw.

=== Hall of Fame ===
On May 10, 2023, the KSW federation announced the introduction of the Hall of Fame, intended to recognize players every year, as well as other people who have made a unique contribution to the history of the organization. The first honored player inducted into the Hall of Fame was former KSW commentator and the first KSW tournament champion, Łukasz "Juras" Jurkowski [33] . The official ceremony of Jurkowski's introduction to the Hall of Fame took place during the XTB KSW 83: Colosseum 2 gala.

=== Special XTB KSW Epic gala ===
On February 24, 2024, a special XTB KSW Epic gala took place, focusing on organizing fights in formulas other than just MMA. During the fight of the evening of this event, Mamed Chalidow and Tomasz Adamek crossed gloves in the boxing formula.

The KSW ring announcer is Waldemar Kasta, a former rapper born in Wrocław.

== Rankings ==
The rankings for the KSW's fighters are both recorded and updated when information has been obtained from the KSW's website.

- Updated as of October 22, 2026.

KSW MMA rankings
Rank	Heavyweight	Light heavyweight	Middleweight	Welterweight
C	(England) Phil De Fries	(Poland) Bartosz Leśko	(Poland) Paweł Pawlak	(Poland) Adrian Bartosiński
1	(Slovakia) Štefan Vojčák (ic)	(Poland) Rafał Haratyk	(Poland) Piotr Kuberski (ic)	(Germany) Muslim Tulshaev
2	(Poland) Arkadiusz Wrzosek	(Poland) Maciej Różański	(Poland) Michał Michalski	(Poland) Kacper Koziorzębski
3	(Poland) Marcin Wójcik	(Poland) Sergiusz Zając	(Poland) Mamed Khalidov	(Poland) Tymoteusz Łopaczyk
4	(Poland) Artur Szpilka	(Turkey) Ibragim Chuzhigaev	(Croatia) Andi Vrtačić ▲1	(Poland) Artur Szczepaniak
5	(Brazil) Augusto Sakai	(Poland) Bartosz Szewczyk	(Poland) Bartosz Kurek ▲1	(France) Adam Masaev
6	(Poland) Szymon Bajor	(Canada) Mariusz Książkiewicz ▲1	(Poland) Andrzek Grzebyk	(Poland) Igor Michaliszyn ▲1
7	(Czech Republic) Michal Martinek	(France) Salim El Ouassaidi	(France) Laïd Zerhouni ▼3	(Latvia) Madras Fleminas ▲1
8	(Brazil) Matheus Scheffel	(Poland) Kacper Sochacki	(Poland) Radosław Paczuski ▼1	(Poland) Dawid Kuczmarski ▲1
9	(Poland) Marek Samociuk	(Belgium) Cedric Lushima	(Poland) Damian Janikowski ▼1	(Poland) Adam Niedźwiedź ▲1
10	(Brazil) Ricardo Prasel	(Poland) Aleksander Winiarski	(Poland) Tomasz Romanowski ▼1	(Poland) Mateusz Pawlik
Rank	Lightweight	Featherweight	Bantamweight	
C	(N/A) Vacant	(Poland) Patryk Kaczmarczyk	(Ukraine) Vitalii Yakymenko	
1	(Moldova) Valeriu Mircea	(Poland) Daniel Rutkowski ▲1	(Poland) Sebastian Przybysz	
2	(Poland) Marcin Held	(Czech Republic) Josef Štummer ▲1	(Brazil) Bruno Azevedo	
3	(Poland) Adam Soldaev	(Poland) Łukasz Charzewski ▲1	(Venezuela) Marcello Morelli	
4	(Poland) Mateusz Makarowski ▼1	(Moldova) Daniel Tărchilă ▲1	(Poland) Kamil Szkaradek	
5	(France) Davy Gallon	(Ukraine) Oleksii Polishchuk ▲1	(Brazil) Rogério Bontorin	
6	(Cape Verde) Wilson Varela ▲1	(France) Souheil Kaouchen ▲1	(Latvia) Edgars Skrīvers	
7	(Poland) Marian Ziółkowski ▼3	(Poland) Michał Domin ▲1	(Brazil) Werlleson Martins	
8	(Poland) Kacper Formela ▼2	(Poland) Wojciech Kazieczko ▲1	(Poland) Andrzej Karkula	
9	(Poland) Roman Szymański ▼1	(Poland) Dawid Kareta ▲1	(Poland) Patryk Surdyn ▼1	
10	(France) Hugo Deux	(France) Nacim Belhouachi	(Poland) Mariusz Joniak ▼1	

== List of KSW events ==
=== Upcoming events ===
No.	Event	Date	Venue	Location
131	XTB KSW 124: Pawlak vs. Kuberski	December 19, 2026	Gliwice Arena	Gliwice, Poland
130	XTB KSW 123: Mircea vs. Held	November 21, 2026	Enea Arena	Szczecin, Poland

=== Past events ===
No.	Event	Date	Venue	Location
129	XTB KSW 122: Yakymenko vs. Morelli	October 10, 2026	Hala Podpromie	Rzeszów, Poland
128	XTB KSW 121: Vojčák vs. Wójcik	September 19, 2026	Home Credit Arena	Liberec, Czech Republic
127	XTB KSW 120: Haratyk vs. Leśko 2	July 18, 2026	Gdynia Arena	Gdynia, Poland
126	XTB KSW 119: Kaczmarczyk vs. Brichta	June 20, 2026	Radom Sports Center	Radom, Poland
125	XTB KSW 118: Kuberski vs. Michalski	May 16, 2026	Arena Kalisz	Kalisz, Poland
124	XTB KSW 117: Pawlak vs. Khalidov	April 18, 2026	Arena COS Torwar	Warsaw, Poland
123	XTB KSW 116: Bartosiński vs. Fleminas	March 14, 2026	Arena Gorzów	Gorzów Wielkopolski, Poland
122	XTB KSW 115: Przybysz vs. Yakymenko	February 21, 2026	Hala RCS	Lubin, Poland
121	XTB KSW 114: Parnasse vs. Held	January 17, 2026	Radom Sports Center	Radom, Poland
120	XTB KSW 113: Bartosiński vs. Tulshaev	December 20, 2025	Atlas Arena	Łódź, Poland
119	XTB KSW 112: Kaczmarczyk vs. Soldaev	November 15, 2025	Enea Arena	Szczecin, Poland
118	XTB KSW 111: De Fries vs. Vojčák	October 18, 2025	Werk Arena	Třinec, Czech Republic
117	XTB KSW 110: Grzebyk vs. Tulshaev	September 20, 2025	Hala Podpromie	Rzeszów, Poland
116	XTB KSW 109: Kuberski vs. Paczuski	August 9, 2025	ATM Studio	Warsaw, Poland
115	XTB KSW 108: Soldaev vs. Brichta	July 19, 2025	Hala Urania	Olsztyn, Poland
114	XTB KSW 107: De Fries vs. Wrzosek	June 14, 2025	Ergo Arena	Gdańsk, Poland
113	XTB KSW 106: Parnasse vs. Ziółkowski	May 10, 2025	LDLC Arena	Lyon, France
112	XTB KSW 105: Bartosiński vs. Grzebyk 2	April 26, 2025	Gliwice Arena	Gliwice, Poland
111	XTB KSW 104: Kuberski vs. Romanowski	March 8, 2025	Arena Gorzów	Gorzów Wielkopolski, Poland
110	XTB KSW 103: Brichta vs. Charzewski	February 21, 2025	Home Credit Arena	Liberec, Czech Republic
109	XTB KSW 102: Przybysz vs. Azevedo	January 25, 2025	Radom Sports Center	Radom, Poland
108	XTB KSW 101: Le Classique	December 20, 2024	Paris La Défense Arena	Nanterre, France
107	XTB KSW 100: Khalidov vs. Bartosiński	November 23, 2024	Gliwice Arena	Gliwice, Poland
106	KSW 99 Vojčák vs. Martínek	October 19, 2024	Gliwice Arena	Gliwice, Poland
105	KSW 98: Paczuski vs Zerhouni	September 14, 2024	Hala RCS	Lubin, Poland
104	KSW 97: Bajor vs Scheffel	August 24, 2024	Arena Jaskółka Tarnów	Tarnów, Poland
103	KSW 96: Pawlak vs. Janikowski 2	July 20, 2024	Łódź Sport Arena	Łódź, Poland
102	KSW 95: Wikłacz vs. Przybysz 5	June 7, 2024	Hala Urania	Olsztyn, Poland
101	XTB KSW 94: Bartosiński vs. Michaliszyn	May 11, 2024	Ergo Arena	Gdańsk, Poland
100	XTB KSW 93: Parnasse vs Mircea	April 6, 2024	Adidas Arena	Paris, France
99	XTB KSW 92: Wikłacz vs. Jojua	March 16, 2024	Arena Gorzów	Gorzów Wielkopolski, Poland
98	XTB KSW Epic: Khalidov vs. Adamek	February 24, 2024	Gliwice Arena	Gliwice, Poland
97	KSW 91: Brichta vs. Mircea	February 17, 2024	Home Credit Arena	Liberec, Czech Republic
96	XTB KSW 90: Wrzosek vs. Vitasović	January 20, 2024	Arena COS Torwar	Warsaw, Poland
95	XTB KSW 89: Bartosiński vs. Parnasse	December 16, 2023	Gliwice Arena	Gliwice, Poland
94	XTB KSW 88: Rutkowski vs. Kaczmarczyk	November 11, 2023	Radom Sports Center	Radom, Poland
93	KSW 87: Stošić vs. Martínek	October 14, 2023	Werk Arena	Třinec, Czech Republic
92	KSW 86: Wikłacz vs. Przybysz 4	September 16, 2023	Hala Orbita	Wrocław, Poland
91	XTB KSW 85: Parnasse vs. Ruchała	August 19, 2023	Amfiteatr Parku Strzeleckiego	Nowy Sacz, Poland
90	KSW 84: De Fries vs. Bajor	July 15, 2023	Gdynia Arena	Gdynia, Poland
89	XTB KSW 83: Colosseum 2	June 3, 2023	PGE Narodowy	Warsaw, Poland
88	KSW 82: Hooi vs. Grzebyk	May 13, 2023	ATM Studio	Warsaw, Poland
87	KSW 81: Bartosinski vs. Szczepaniak	April 22, 2023	Ice Arena Tomaszów Mazowiecki	Tomaszów Mazowiecki, Poland
86	KSW 80: Ruchala vs. Eskiev	March 17, 2023	Hala RCS Sport	Lubin, Poland
85	KSW 79: De Fries vs. Duffee	February 25, 2023	Home Credit Arena	Liberec, Czech Republic
84	KSW 78: Materla vs. Grove 2	January 28, 2023	Enea Arena	Szczecin, Poland
83	KSW 77: Khalidov vs. Pudzianowski	December 17, 2022	Gliwice Arena	Gliwice, Poland
82	KSW 76: Parnasse vs. Rajewski	November 12, 2022	Sports and Entertainment Hall	Grodzisk Wielkopolski, Poland
81	KSW 75: Stasiak vs. Ruchala	October 14, 2022	Amfiteatr Parku Strzeleckiego	Nowy Sacz, Poland
80	KSW 74: De Fries vs. Prasel	September 10, 2022	Arena Ostrów	Ostrów Wielkopolski, Poland
79	KSW 73: Wrzosek vs. Sarara	August 20, 2022	Arena COS Torwar	Warsaw, Poland
78	KSW 72: Romanowski vs. Grzebyk	July 23, 2022	Kadzielnia Amphitheater	Kielce, Poland
77	KSW 71: Ziolkowski vs. Rajewski	June 18, 2022	Arena Toruń	Toruń, Poland
76	KSW 70: Pudzianowski vs. Materla	May 28, 2022	Atlas Arena	Łódź, Poland
75	KSW 69: Przybysz vs. Martins	April 23, 2022	ATM Studio	Warsaw, Poland
74	KSW 68: Parnasse vs. Rutkowski	March 19, 2022	Radom Sports Center	Radom, Poland
73	KSW 67: De Fries vs. Stošić	February 26, 2022	Global EXPO	Warsaw, Poland
72	KSW 66: Ziolkowski vs. Mankowski	January 15, 2022	Enea Arena	Szczecin, Poland
71	KSW 65: Khalidov vs. Soldic	December 18, 2021	Gliwice Arena	Gliwice, Poland
70	KSW 64: Przybysz vs. Santos	October 23, 2021	Atlas Arena	Łódź, Poland
69	KSW 63: Crime of The Century	September 4, 2021	ATM studio	Warsaw, Poland
68	KSW 62: Kołecki vs. Szostak	July 17, 2021	ATM studio	Warsaw, Poland
67	KSW 61: To Fight or Not To Fight	June 5, 2021	Ergo Arena	Gdańsk, Poland
66	KSW 60: De Fries vs. Narkun 2	April 24, 2021	Wytwórnia Club	Łódź, Poland
65	KSW 59: Fight Code	March 20, 2021	Wytwórnia Club	Łódź, Poland
64	KSW 58: Parnasse vs. Torres	January 30, 2021	Wytwórnia Club	Łódź, Poland
63	KSW 57: De Fries vs. Kita	December 19, 2020	Wytwórnia Club	Łódź, Poland
62	KSW 56: Materla vs. Soldić	November 14, 2020	Wytwórnia Club	Łódź, Poland
61	KSW 55: Askham vs. Khalidov 2	October 10, 2020	Wytwórnia Club	Łódź, Poland
60	KSW 54: Gamrot vs. Ziółkowski	August 29, 2020	Global EXPO	Warsaw, Poland
59	KSW 53: Reborn	July 11, 2020	ATM studio	Warsaw, Poland
58	KSW 52: Race	December 7, 2019	Gliwice Arena	Gliwice, Poland
57	KSW 51: Croatia	November 9, 2019	Arena Zagreb	Zagreb, Croatia
56	KSW 50: London	September 14, 2019	Wembley Arena	London, United Kingdom
55	KSW 49: Soldić vs. Kaszubowski	May 18, 2019	Ergo Arena	Gdańsk, Poland
54	KSW 48: Szymański vs. Parnasse	April 27, 2019	Globus Hall	Lublin, Poland
53	KSW 47: The X-Warriors	March 23, 2019	Atlas Arena	Łódź, Poland
52	KSW 46: Narkun vs. Khalidov 2	December 1, 2018	Gliwice Arena	Gliwice, Poland
51	KSW 45: The Return to Wembley	October 6, 2018	Wembley Arena	London, United Kingdom
50	KSW 44: The Game	June 9, 2018	Ergo Arena	Gdańsk, Poland
49	KSW 43: Soldić vs. Du Plessis	April 14, 2018	Centennial Hall	Wrocław, Poland
48	KSW 42: Khalidov vs. Narkun	March 3, 2018	Atlas Arena	Łódź, Poland
47	KSW 41: Mankowski vs. Soldić	December 23, 2017	Spodek	Katowice, Poland
46	KSW 40: Dublin	October 22, 2017	3Arena	(Republic of Ireland) Dublin, Ireland
45	KSW 39: Colosseum	May 27, 2017	The PGE Narodowy	Warsaw, Poland
44	KSW 38: Live in Studio	April 7, 2017	Studio Apricor	Sękocin Nowy, Poland
43	KSW 37: Circus of Pain	December 3, 2016	Tauron Arena	Kraków, Poland
42	KSW 36: Trzy Korony	October 1, 2016	Hala CRS	Zielona Góra, Poland
41	KSW 35: Khalidov vs. Karaoglu	May 27, 2016	Ergo Arena	Gdańsk, Poland
40	KSW 34: New Order	March 5, 2016	Hala Torwar	Warsaw, Poland
39	KSW 33: Khalidov vs. Materla	November 28, 2015	Tauron Arena	Kraków, Poland
38	KSW 32: Road to Wembley	October 31, 2015	Wembley Arena	London, United Kingdom
37	KSW 31: Materla vs. Drwal	May 23, 2015	Ergo Arena	Gdańsk, Poland
36	KSW 30: Genesis	February 21, 2015	HWS Arena	Poznań, Poland
35	KSW 29: Reload	December 6, 2014	Kraków Arena	Kraków, Poland
34	KSW 28: Fighters Den	October 4, 2014	Enea Arena	Szczecin, Poland
33	KSW 27: Cage Time	May 17, 2014	Ergo Arena	Gdańsk, Poland
32	KSW 26: Materla vs. Silva 3	March 22, 2014	Hala Torwar	Warsaw, Poland
31	KSW 25: Khalidov vs. Sakurai	December 8, 2013	Wrocław Centennial Hall	Wrocław, Poland
30	KSW 24: Clash of the Giants	September 28, 2013	Atlas Arena	Łódź, Poland
29	KSW 23: Khalidov vs. Manhoef	June 8, 2013	Ergo Arena	Gdańsk, Poland
28	KSW 22: Pride Time	March 16, 2013	Hala Torwar	Warsaw, Poland
27	KSW 21: Ultimate Explanation	December 1, 2012	Hala Torwar	Warsaw, Poland
26	KSW 20: Fighting Symphonies	September 15, 2012	Ergo Arena	Gdańsk, Poland
25	KSW 19: Pudzianowski vs. Sapp	May 12, 2012	Atlas Arena	Łódź, Poland
24	KSW 18: Unfinished Sympathy	February 25, 2012	Orlen Arena	Płock, Poland
23	KSW 17: Revenge	November 26, 2011	Atlas Arena	Łódź, Poland
22	KSW 16: Khalidov vs. Lindland	May 21, 2011	Ergo Arena	Gdańsk, Poland
21	KSW 15: Contemporary Gladiators	March 19, 2011	Hala Torwar	Warsaw, Poland
20	KSW Extra 2	January 29, 2011	Hala MOSiR	Ełk, Poland
19	KSW Fight Club	October 9, 2010	Ryn Castle	Ryn, Poland
18	KSW 14: Judgment Day	September 18, 2010	Atlas Arena	Łódź, Poland
17	KSW 13: Kumite	May 7, 2010	Spodek	Katowice, Poland
16	KSW Elimination 3	April 1, 2010	CWKS Legia Boxing Club	Warsaw, Poland
15	KSW 12: Pudzianowski vs. Najman	December 11, 2009	Hala Torwar	Warsaw, Poland
14	KSW 11: Khalidov vs. Acacio	May 15, 2009	Hala Torwar	Warsaw, Poland
13	KSW 10: Dekalog	December 12, 2008	Hala Torwar	Warsaw, Poland
12	KSW Extra	September 13, 2008	Hala Centrum	Dabrowa Górnicza, Poland
11	KSW IX: Konfrontacja	May 9, 2008	Hala Torwar	Warsaw, Poland
10	KSW Elimination 2	March 29, 2008	Hala Stulecia	Wrocław, Poland
9	KSW VIII: Konfrontacja	November 10, 2007	Hala Torwar	Warsaw, Poland
8	KSW Elimination 1	September 15, 2007	Hala Orbita	Wrocław, Poland
7	KSW VII: Konfrontacja	June 2, 2007	Hala Torwar	Warsaw, Poland
6	KSW VI: Konfrontacja	October 14, 2006	Hala Torwar	Warsaw, Poland
5	KSW V: Konfrontacja	June 3, 2006	Hotel Marriott	Warsaw, Poland
4	KSW IV: Konfrontacja	September 10, 2005	Hotel Marriott	Warsaw, Poland
3	KSW III: Konfrontacja	January 15, 2005	Hotel Marriott	Warsaw, Poland
2	KSW II: Konfrontacja	October 7, 2004	Hotel Marriott	Warsaw, Poland
1	KSW I: Konfrontacja	February 27, 2004	Hotel Marriott	Warsaw, Poland

List of KSW events:

- 2004 in Konfrontacja Sztuk Walki - 2005 in Konfrontacja Sztuk Walki - 2006 in Konfrontacja Sztuk Walki - 2007 in Konfrontacja Sztuk Walki - 2008 in Konfrontacja Sztuk Walki - 2009 in Konfrontacja Sztuk Walki - 2010 in Konfrontacja Sztuk Walki - 2011 in Konfrontacja Sztuk Walki - 2012 in Konfrontacja Sztuk Walki - 2013 in Konfrontacja Sztuk Walki - 2014 in Konfrontacja Sztuk Walki - 2015 in Konfrontacja Sztuk Walki - 2016 in Konfrontacja Sztuk Walki - 2017 in Konfrontacja Sztuk Walki - 2018 in Konfrontacja Sztuk Walki - 2019 in Konfrontacja Sztuk Walki - 2020 in Konfrontacja Sztuk Walki - 2021 in Konfrontacja Sztuk Walki - 2022 in Konfrontacja Sztuk Walki - 2023 in Konfrontacja Sztuk Walki - 2024 in Konfrontacja Sztuk Walki - 2025 in Konfrontacja Sztuk Walki - 2026 in Konfrontacja Sztuk Walki

=== Event locations ===
- The following cities have hosted a total of 126 KSW events as of XTB KSW 122: Yakymenko vs. Morelli (10.10.2026.)
Poland (total: 110)
- Masovian Voivodeship, (39)
  - Warsaw, Hala Torwar (15)
  - Warsaw, ATM Studio (6)
  - Radom, Radom Sports Center (5)
  - Warsaw, Hotel Marriott (5)
  - Warsaw, Stadion Narodowy (2)
  - Warsaw, Global EXPO (2)
  - Warsaw, CWKS Legia Boxing Club (1)
  - Płock, Orlen Arena (1)
  - Grodzisk Mazowiecki, Sports and Entertainment Hall (1)
  - Sękocin Nowy, Studio Apricor (1)
- Łódź Voivodeship, (16)
  - Łódź, Atlas Arena (9)
  - Łódź, Wytwórnia Club (5)
  - Tomaszów Mazowiecki, Ice Arena Tomaszów Mazowiecki (1)
  - Łódź, Łódź Sport Arena (1)
- Pomeranian Voivodeship, (12)
  - Gdańsk, Ergo Arena (10)
  - Gdynia, Gdynia Arena (2)
- Silesian Voivodeship, (12)
  - Gliwice, Gliwice Arena (9)
  - Katowice, Spodek (2)
  - Dąbrowa Górnicza, Hala Centrum (1)
- Lower Silesian Voivodeship, (8)
  - Lubin, Hala RCS Sport (3)
  - Wrocław, Hala Stulecia (3)
  - Wrocław, Hala Orbita (2)
- Lesser Poland Voivodeship, (6)
  - Kraków, Kraków Arena (3)
  - Nowy Sacz, Amfiteatr Parku Strzeleckiego (2)
  - Tarnów, Arena Jaskółka Tarnów (1)
- Lubusz Voivodeship, (4)
  - Gorzów Wielkopolski, Arena Gorzów (3)
  - Zielona Góra, CRS Hall (1)
- Warmian–Masurian Voivodeship, (4)
  - Olsztyn, Hala Urania (2)
  - Ełk, Hala MOSiR (1)
  - Ryn, Ryn Castle (1)
- West Pomeranian Voivodeship, (4)
  - Szczecin, Enea Arena (4)
- Greater Poland Voivodeship, (3)
  - Poznań, HWS Arena (1)
  - Ostrów Wielkopolski, Arena Ostrów (1)
  - Kalisz, Arena Kalisz (1)
- Subcarpathian Voivodeship, (2)
  - Rzeszów, Hala Podpromie (2)
- Lublin Voivodeship, (1)
  - Lublin, Globus Hall (1)
- Kuyavian–Pomeranian Voivodeship, (1)
  - Toruń, Arena Toruń (1)
- Świętokrzyskie Voivodeship, (1)
  - Kielce, Kadzielnia Amphitheater (1)

Czech Republic (total: 6)

- Liberec, Home Credit Arena (4)
- Třinec, Werk Arena (2)

United Kingdom (total: 3)

- London, Wembley Arena (3)

France (total: 3)

- Paris, Adidas Arena (1)
- Nanterre, Paris La Défense Arena (1)
- Lyon, LDLC Arena (1)

Ireland (total: 1)

- Dublin, 3Arena (1)

Croatia (total: 1)

- Zagreb, Arena Zagreb (1)

== Current champions ==
=== Men's divisions ===
Division	Upper weight limit	Champion	Since	Title defenses
Heavyweight	120 kg (264.6 lb; 18.9 st)	(England) Phil De Fries	April 14, 2018 (KSW 43)	14
Heavyweight	120 kg (264.6 lb; 18.9 st)	(Slovakia) Štefan Vojčák (interim)	September 19, 2026 (KSW 121)	0
Light Heavyweight	93 kg (205.0 lb; 14.6 st)	(Poland) Bartosz Leśko	July 18, 2026 (KSW 120)	0
Middleweight	84 kg (185.2 lb; 13.2 st)	(Poland) Paweł Pawlak	June 3, 2023 (KSW 83: Colosseum 2)	4
Middleweight	84 kg (185.2 lb; 13.2 st)	(Poland) Piotr Kuberski (interim)	March 8, 2025 (KSW 104)	2
Welterweight	77 kg (169.8 lb; 12.1 st)	(Poland) Adrian Bartosiński	April 22, 2023 (KSW 81)	5
Lightweight	70 kg (154.3 lb; 11.0 st)	(Poland) Marcin Held	November 21, 2026 (KSW 123)	0
Featherweight	66 kg (145.5 lb; 10.4 st)	(Poland) Patryk Kaczmarczyk	April 6, 2026	1
Bantamweight	61 kg (134.5 lb; 9.6 st)	(Ukraine) Vitalii Yakymenko	February 21, 2026 (KSW 115)	1

=== Women's divisions ===
Division	Upper weight limit	Champion	Since	Title defenses
Bantamweight	61 kg (134.5 lb; 9.6 st)	(Croatia) Sara Luzar-Smajić	May 16, 2026 (KSW 118)	0
Flyweight	57 kg (125.7 lb; 9.0 st)	Vacant	September 23, 2018	
Strawweight	52 kg (114.6 lb; 8.2 st)	Vacant	September 21, 2015	

== Championship history ==
=== Heavyweight championship ===
120 kg (264.6 lb; 18.9 st)

No.	Name	Event	Date	Reign (total)	Defenses
1	(Poland) Karol Bedorf def. Pawel Nastula	KSW 24; Łódź, Poland	Sep 28, 2013	1162 days	1. def. Rolles Gracie at KSW 28 on Oct 4, 2014; 2. def. Michał Kita at KSW 33 on Nov 28, 2015; 3. def. James McSweeney at KSW 34 on Mar 5, 2016
2	(Brazil) Fernando Rodrigues Jr.	KSW 37; Kraków, Poland	Dec 3, 2016	175 days	
3	(Poland) Marcin Rozalski	KSW 39; Warsaw, Poland	May 27, 2017	163 days	
Rozalski vacated the title on November 6, 2017, after he announced his return to kickboxing.
4	(England) Phil De Fries def. Michał Andryszak	KSW 43; Wrocław, Poland	Apr 14, 2018	3144 days (incumbent)	1. def. Karol Bedorf at KSW 45 on Oct 6, 2018; 2. def. Tomasz Narkun at KSW 47 on Mar 23, 2019; 3. def. Luis Henrique at KSW 50 on Sep 14, 2019; 4. def. Michał Kita at KSW 57 on Dec 19, 2020; 5. def. Tomasz Narkun at KSW 60 on Apr 24, 2021; 6. def. Darko Stošić at KSW 67 on Feb 26, 2022; 7. def. Ricardo Prasel at KSW 74 on Sep 10, 2022; 8. def. Todd Duffee at KSW 79 on Feb 25, 2023; 9. def. Szymon Bajor at KSW 84 on Jul 15, 2023; 10. def. Augusto Sakai at KSW 95 on Jun 7, 2024; 11. def. Darko Stošić at KSW 100 on Nov 16, 2024; 12. def. Arkadiusz Wrzosek at KSW 107 on Jun 14, 2025; 13. def. Štefan Vojčák at KSW 111 on Oct 18, 2025; 14. def. Marcin Wójcik at KSW 117 on Apr 18, 2026
–	(Slovakia) Štefan Vojčák def. Marcin Wójcik for interim title	KSW 121; Liberec, Czech Republic	Sep 19, 2026	64 days (incumbent)	

=== Light heavyweight championship ===
93 kg (205.0 lb; 14.6 st)

No.	Name	Event	Date	Reign (total)	Defenses
1	(Poland) Mamed Khalidov def. Daniel Acacio	KSW 11; Warsaw, Poland	May 15, 2009	? days	1. drew with Ryuta Sakurai at KSW 13 on May 7, 2010
Title vacated after Khalidov moved down to middleweight.
2	(Cameroon) Rameau Thierry Sokoudjou def. Jan Błachowicz	KSW 15; Warsaw, Poland	Mar 19, 2011	252 days	
3	(Poland) Jan Błachowicz	KSW 17; Łódź, Poland	Nov 26, 2011	796 days	1. def. Houston Alexander at KSW 20 on Sep 15, 2012; 2. def. Goran Reljic at KSW 22 on Mar 16, 2013
Błachowicz vacated the title on January 30, 2014, after he signed with Ultimate Fighting Championship.
4	(Croatia) Goran Reljić def. Attila Végh	KSW 31; Gdańsk, Poland	May 23, 2015	161 days	
5	(Poland) Tomasz Narkun	KSW 32; London, England	Oct 31, 2015	2268 days	1. def. Cassio Barbosa de Oliveira at KSW 34 on Mar 5, 2016; 2. def. Rameau Thierry Sokoudjou at KSW 36 on Oct 1, 2016; 3. def. Marcin Wójcik at KSW 39 on May 27, 2017; 4. def. Przemyslaw Mysiala at KSW 50 on Sep 14, 2019; 5. def. Ivan Erslan at KSW 56 on Nov 14, 2020
6	(Turkey) Ibragim Chuzhigaev	KSW 66; Szczecin, Poland	Jan 15, 2022	689 days	1. def. Ivan Erslan at KSW 77 on Dec 17, 2022; 2. def. Bohdan Gdnidko at KSW 85 on Aug 19, 2023
Title was vacated on December 5, 2023, after Chuzhigaev left KSW.
7	(Poland) Rafał Haratyk def. Damian Piwowarczyk	KSW Epic: Khalidov vs. Adamek; Gliwice, Poland	Feb 24, 2024	875 days	1. def. Marcin Wójcik at KSW 100 on Nov 16, 2024; 2. def. Bartosz Leśko at KSW 111 on Oct 18, 2025
8	(Poland) Bartosz Leśko	KSW 120; Gdynia, Poland	Jul 18, 2026	127 days (incumbent)	

=== Middleweight championship ===
84 kg (185.2 lb; 13.2 st)

No.	Name	Event	Date	Reign (total)	Defenses
1	(Poland) Krzysztof Kułak def. Vitor Nobrega	KSW 13; Katowice, Poland	May 7, 2010	? days	
Title vacated after Kułak was unable to defend the title due to injury.
2	(Poland) Michał Materla def. Jay Silva	KSW 19; Łódź, Poland	May 12, 2012	1295 days	1. def. Rodney Wallace at KSW 21 on Dec 1, 2012; 2. def. Kendall Grove at KSW 23 on Jun 8, 2013; 3. def. Jay Silva at KSW 26 on Mar 22, 2014; 4. def. Tomasz Drwal at KSW 31 on May 23, 2015
3	(Poland) Mamed Khalidov	KSW 33; Kraków, Poland	Nov 28, 2015	975 days	1. def. Aziz Karaoglu at KSW 35 on May 27, 2016
Khalilov vacated the title after lost Tomasz Narkun in a champion vs. champion superfight and instead pursue a rematch against Narkun.
4	(England) Scott Askham def. Michał Materla	KSW 49; Gdańsk, Poland	May 18, 2019	511 days	
5	(Poland) Mamed Khalidov (2)	KSW 55; Łódź, Poland	Oct 10, 2020	434 days	
6	(Croatia) Roberto Soldić	KSW 65; Gliwice, Poland	Dec 18, 2021	226 days	
Soldić vacated the title on August 1, 2022, when he signed with ONE Championship.
7	(Poland) Paweł Pawlak def. Tomasz Romanowski	KSW 83; Warsaw, Poland	Jun 3, 2023	1268 days (incumbent)	1. def. Michał Materla at KSW 89 on Dec 16, 2023; 2. def. Damian Janikowski at KSW 96 on Jul 20, 2024; 3. def. Laïd Zerhouni at KSW 113 on Dec 20, 2025 4. def. Mamed Khalidov at KSW 117 on Apr 18, 2026
–	(Poland) Piotr Kuberski def. Tomasz Romanowski for interim title	KSW 104; Gorzów Wielkopolski, Poland	Mar 8, 2025	624 days (incumbent)	1. def. Radosław Paczuski at KSW 109 on Aug 9, 2025 2. def. Michał Michalski at KSW 118 on May 16, 2026

=== Welterweight championship ===
77 kg (169.8 lb; 12.1 st)

No.	Name	Event	Date	Reign (total)	Defenses
1	(Russia) Aslambek Saidov def. Borys Mańkowski	KSW 21; Warsaw, Poland	Dec 1, 2012	532 days	1. def. Daniel Acacio at KSW 25 on Dec 8, 2013
2	(Poland) Borys Mańkowski	KSW 27; Gdańsk, Poland	May 17, 2014	1316 days	1. def. David Zawada at KSW 29 on Dec 6, 2014; 2. def. Mohsen Bahari at KSW 30 on Feb 21, 2015; 3. def. Jesse Taylor at KSW 32 on Oct 31, 2015; 4. def. John Maguire at KSW 37 on Dec 3, 2016
3	(Croatia) Roberto Soldić	KSW 41; Katowice, Poland	Dec 23, 2017	112 days	
4	(South Africa) Dricus du Plessis	KSW 43; Wrocław, Poland	Apr 14, 2018	175 days	
5	(Croatia) Roberto Soldić (2)	KSW 45; London, England	Oct 6, 2018	1395 days	1. def. Krystian Kaszubowski at KSW 49 on May 18, 2019; 2. def. Patrik Kincl at KSW 63 on Sep 4, 2021
Soldić vacated the title on August 1, 2022, when he signed with ONE Championship.
6	(Poland) Adrian Bartosiński def. Artur Szczepaniak	KSW 81; Tomaszów Mazowiecki, Poland	Apr 22, 2023	1310 days (incumbent)	1. def. Salahdine Parnasse at KSW 89 on Dec 16, 2023; 2. def. Igor Michaliszyn at KSW 94 on May 11, 2024; 3. def. Andrzej Grzebyk at KSW 105 on Apr 26, 2025; 4. def. Muslim Tulshaev at KSW 113 on Dec 20, 2025; 5. def. Madars Fleminas at KSW 116 on Mar 14, 2026

=== Lightweight championship ===
70 kg (154.3 lb; 11.0 st)

No.	Name	Event	Date	Reign (total)	Defenses
1	(Poland) Maciej Jewtuszko def. Artur Sowiński	KSW 21; Warsaw, Poland	Dec 1, 2012	812 days	
Jewtuszko vacated the title on February 21, 2015, when he pulled out of a title fight due to an injury and moved up to compete in the Welterweight division.
2	(Poland) Mateusz Gamrot def. Mansour Barnaoui	KSW 35; Gdánsk, Poland	May 27, 2016	1574 days	1. def. Renato Gomes at KSW 36 on Oct 1, 2016; 2. def. Norman Parke at KSW 39 on May 27, 2017; 3. def. Grzegorz Szulakowski at KSW 42 on Mar 3, 2018; 4. def. Marian Ziółkowski at KSW 54 on Aug 29, 2020
–	(Northern Ireland) Norman Parke def. Marcin Wrzosek for interim title	KSW 50; London, England	Sep 14, 2019	–	
Originally scheduled as a title unification bout, Mateusz Gamrot defeated interim champion Norman Parke on July 11, 2020 in a non-title bout due to Parke missing weight. Interim title was vacated at this time.
Gamrot vacated the title on September 17, 2020, when he signed with the Ultimate Fighting Championship.
3	(Poland) Marian Ziółkowski def. Roman Szymański	KSW 57; Łódź, Poland	Dec 19, 2020	896 days	1. def. Maciej Kazieczko at KSW 60 on Apr 24, 2021; 2. def. Borys Mańkowski at KSW 66 on Jan 15, 2022; 3. def. Sebastian Rajewski at KSW 71 on Jun 18, 2022
–	(France) Salahdine Parnasse def. Sebastian Rajewski for interim title	KSW 76; Grodzisk Mazowiecki, Poland	Nov 12, 2022	–	
Ziółkowski vacated the title due to continue inactivity and an injury minutes before his fight against Salahdine Parnasse at KSW 83.
4	(France) Salahdine Parnasse promoted to undisputed champion	—	Jun 3, 2023	1050 days	1. def. interim champion Valeriu Mircea at KSW 93 on Apr 6, 2024 2. def. Wilson Varela at KSW 101 on Dec 20, 2024; 3. def. Marian Ziółkowski at KSW 106 on May 10, 2025; 4. def. Marcin Held at KSW 114 on Jan 17, 2026
–	(Moldova) Valeriu Mircea def. Leo Brichta for interim title	KSW 91; Liberec, Czech Republic	Feb 17, 2024	–	
Parnesse officially vacated the title on April 18, 2026, when he left the promotion.
5	(Poland) Marcin Held def. Valeriu Mircea	KSW 123; Szczecin, Poland	Nov 21, 2026	1 day (incumbent)	

=== Featherweight championship ===
66 kg (145.5 lb; 10.4 st)

No.	Name	Event	Date	Reign (total)	Defenses
1	(Poland) Artur Sowiński def. Kleber Koike Erbst	KSW 33; Kraków, Poland	Nov 28, 2015	371 days	1. def. Fabiano Silva da Conceicao at KSW 34 on Mar 5, 2016
2	(Poland) Marcin Wrzosek	KSW 37; Kraków, Poland	Dec 3, 2016	175 days	
3	(Japan) Kleber Koike Erbst	KSW 39; Warsaw, Poland	May 27, 2017	209 days	
Koike was stripped of the title on December 22, 2017, after failing to make weight for his title defense against Artur Sowiński at KSW 41.
4	(Poland) Mateusz Gamrot def. Kleber Koike Erbst	KSW 46; Gliwice, Poland	Dec 1, 2018	167 days	
–	(France) Salahdine Parnasse def. Roman Szymanski for interim title	KSW 48; Lublin, Poland	Apr 27, 2019	–	
Gamrot vacated the belt to focus on the Lightweight division. The interim champion Salahdine Parnasse became the new champion.
5	(France) Salahdine Parnasse promoted to undisputed champion	—	May 17, 2019	624 days	1. def. Ivan Buchinger at KSW 52 on Dec 7, 2019
6	(Austria) Daniel Torres	KSW 58; Łódź, Poland	Jan 30, 2021	321 days	
Torres was stripped of the title on December 17, 2021, after failing to make weight for his title defense against Salahdine Parnasse at KSW 65.
7	(France) Salahdine Parnasse (2) def. Daniel Torres	KSW 65; Gliwice, Poland	Dec 18, 2021	1582 days	1. def. Daniel Rutkowski at KSW 68 on Mar 19, 2022; 2. def. interim champion Robert Ruchała at KSW 85 on Aug 19, 2023
–	(Poland) Robert Ruchała def. Lom-Ali Eskiev for interim title	KSW 80; Lublin, Poland	Mar 17, 2023	–	
–	(Poland) Robert Ruchała (2) def. Patryk Kaczmarczyk for interim title	KSW 94; Gdańsk, Poland	May 11, 2024	–	1. def. Kacper Formela at KSW 100 on Nov 16, 2024
Ruchała vacated the interim title on June 19, 2025, when he signed with the UFC.
–	(Poland) Patryk Kaczmarczyk def. Adam Soldaev for interim title	KSW 112; Szczecin, Poland	Nov 15, 2025	-	
Parnasse was stripped of the featherweight title on April 6, 2026, after his addition to the MVP MMA: Rousey vs. Carano card.
8	(Poland) Patryk Kaczmarczyk promoted to undisputed champion	—	Apr 6, 2026	230 days (incumbent)	1. def. Leo Brichta at KSW 119 on Jun 20, 2026

=== Bantamweight championship ===
61 kg (134.5 lb; 9.6 st)

No.	Name	Event	Date	Reign (total)	Defenses
1	(Croatia) Antun Račić def. Damian Stasiak	KSW 51; Zagreb, Croatia	Nov 9, 2019	497 days	1. def. Bruno dos Santos at KSW 57 on Dec 19, 2020
2	(Poland) Sebastian Przybysz	KSW 59; Łódź, Poland	Mar 20, 2021	637 days	1. def. Bruno dos Santos at KSW 64 on Oct 23, 2021; 2. def. Werlleson Martins at KSW 69 on Apr 23, 2022
3	(Poland) Jakub Wikłacz	KSW 77; Gliwice, Poland	Dec 17, 2022	730 days	1. drew with Sebastian Przybysz at KSW 86 on Sep 16, 2023; 2. def. Zuriko Jojua at KSW 92 on Mar 16, 2024; 3. def. Sebastian Przybysz at KSW 95 on Jun 7, 2024
Wikłacz vacated the title on December 16, 2024, when he parted ways with KSW.
4	(Poland) Sebastian Przybysz (2) def. Bruno Azevedo	KSW 102; Radom, Poland	Jan 25, 2025	392 days	1. def. Marcelo Morelli at KSW 107 on Jun 14, 2025
5	(Ukraine) Vitalii Yakymenko	KSW 115; Lubin, Poland	Feb 21, 2026	274 days (incumbent)	1. def. Marcelo Morelli at KSW 122 on Oct 10, 2026

=== Women's bantamweight championship ===
61 kg (134.5 lb; 9.6 st)

No.	Name	Event	Date	Reign (total)	Defenses
1	(Croatia) Sara Luzar-Smajić def. Wiktoria Czyżewska	KSW 118; Kalisz, Poland	May 16, 2026	190 days (incumbent)	

=== Women's flyweight championship ===
57 kg (125.7 lb; 9.0 st)

No.	Name	Event	Date	Reign (total)	Defenses
1	(Brazil) Ariane Lipski def. Diana Belbiţă	KSW 39; Warsaw, Poland	May 27, 2017	485 days	1. def. Mariana Morais at KSW 40 on Oct 22, 2017; 2. def. Silvana Gómez Juárez at KSW 42 on Mar 3, 2018
Lipski vacated the title on September 24, 2018, when she signed with the Ultimate Fighting Championship.

=== Women's strawweight championship ===
52 kg (114.6 lb; 8.2 st)

No.	Name	Event	Date	Reign (total)	Defenses
1	(Poland) Karolina Kowalkiewicz def. Marta Chojnoska	KSW 23; Gdańsk, Poland	Jun 8, 2013	851 days	1. def. Jasminka Cive at KSW 27 on May 17, 2014
Kowalkiewicz vacated the title on October 7, 2015, when she signed with the Ultimate Fighting Championship.

== KSW fighters ==
- List of current KSW fighters

== Notable fighters ==
Poland

- (Poland) Tomasz Adamek
- (Poland) Michał Andryszak
- (Poland) Adrian Bartosiński
- (Poland) Karol Bedorf
- (Poland) Jan Błachowicz
- (Poland) Tomasz Drwal
- (Poland) Bartosz Fabiński
- (Poland) Mateusz Gamrot
- (Poland) Krzysztof Głowacki
- (Poland) Damian Grabowski
- (Poland) Rafał Haratyk
- (Poland) Marcin Held
- (Poland) Rafal Jackiewicz
- (Poland) Damian Janikowski
- (Poland) Maciej Jewtuszko
- (Poland) Lukasz Jurkowski
- (Poland) Dawid Kasperski
- (Poland) Mamed Khalidov
- (Poland) Karolina Kowalkiewicz
- (Poland) Szymon Kołecki
- (Poland) Piotr Kuberski
- (Poland) Bartosz Leśko
- (Poland) Tymoteusz Łopaczyk
- (Poland) Borys Mankowski
- (Poland) Michał Materla
- (Poland) Paweł "Popek" Mikołajuw
- (Poland) Tomasz Narkun
- (Poland) Pawel Nastula
- (Poland) Daniel Omielańczuk
- (Poland) Wojciech Orłowski
- (Poland) Paweł Pawlak
- (Poland) Damian Piwowarczyk
- (Poland) Mariusz Pudzianowski
- (Poland) Marcin Różalski
- (Poland) Robert Ruchała
- (Poland) Daniel Rutkowski
- (Poland) Aslambek Saidov
- (Poland) Przemysław Saleta
- (Poland) Marek Samociuk
- (Poland) Tomasz Sarara
- (Poland) Daniel Skibiński
- (Poland) Peter Sobotta
- (Poland) Artur Sowiński
- (Poland) Damian Stasiak
- (Poland) Artur Szpilka
- (Poland) Jakub Wikłacz
- (Poland) Marcin Wójcik
- (Poland) Arkadiusz Wrzosek

Brazil

- (Brazil) Daniel Acácio
- (Brazil) Rogério Bontorin
- (Brazil) Maiquel Falcao
- (Brazil) Kalindra Faria
- (Brazil) Rolles Gracie Jr.
- (Brazil) Luis Henrique
- (Brazil) Ariane Lipski
- (Brazil) Mario Miranda
- (Brazil) Julio Cesar Neves
- (Brazil) Vitor Nobrega
- (Brazil) Rousimar Palhares
- (Brazil) Wagner Prado
- (Brazil) Fernando Rodriguez Jr
- (Brazil) Augusto Sakai
- (Brazil) Henrique da Silva
- (Brazil) Thiago Silva
- (Brazil) Paulo Thiago
- (Brazil) Daniel Torres

United States

- (United States) Houston Alexander
- (United States) Josh Barnett
- (United States) Brett Cooper
- (United States) Todd Duffee
- (United States) Eric Esch
- (United States) Kendall Grove
- (United States) Jason Guida
- (United States) Mike Hayes
- (United States) Matt Horwich
- (United States) James Irvin
- (United States) Matt Lindland
- (United States) Sean McCorkle
- (United States) Bob Sapp
- (United States) Jesse Taylor
- (United States) Rodney Wallace
- (United States) Virgil Zwicker

England

- (England) Scott Askham
- (England) Tom Breese
- (England) Phil De Fries
- (England) Eddie Hall
- (England) John Maguire
- (England) James McSweeney
- (England) James Thompson
- (England) Oli Thompson
- (England) Jim Wallhead
- (England) Curt Warburton
- (England) Andre Winner

Croatia

- (Croatia) Ante Delija
- (Croatia) Ivan Erslan
- (Croatia) Igor Pokrajac
- (Croatia) Goran Reljic
- (Croatia) Roberto Soldić
- (Croatia) Ivica Trušček

Czech Republic

- (Czech Republic) Leo Brichta
- (Czech Republic) Patrik Kincl
- (Czech Republic) Viktor Pešta
- (Czech Republic) Simona Soukupova
- (Czech Republic) Josef Štummer

France

- (France) Mansour Barnaoui
- (France) Francis Carmont
- (France) Hugo Deux
- (France) Salahdine Parnasse
- (France) Oumar Sy

Japan

- (Japan) Yusuke Kawaguchi
- (Japan) Kleber Koike Erbst
- (Japan) Satoshi Ishii
- (Japan) Ryuta Sakurai
- (Japan) Kazuki Tokudome

Germany

- (Germany) Sheila Gaff
- (Germany) Abusupiyan Magomedov
- (Germany) Muslim Tulshaev
- (Germany) David Zawada

Netherlands

- (Netherlands) Rodney Glunder
- (Netherlands) Brian Hooi
- (Netherlands) Valentijn Overeem
- (Netherlands) Errol Zimmerman

Ukraine

- (Ukraine) Bohdan Gnidko
- (Ukraine) Sasha Moisa
- (Ukraine) Oleksii Polischuck
- (Ukraine) Vitalii Yakymenko

Serbia

- (Serbia) Aleksandar Ilić
- (Serbia) Darko Stošić
- (Serbia) Miljan Zdravković

Slovakia

- (Slovakia) Ivan Buchinger
- (Slovakia) Attila Végh
- (Slovakia) Štefan Vojčák

Australia

- (Australia) Peter Graham
- (Australia) Paul Slowinski

Lithuania

- (Lithuania) Sergej Grecicho
- (Lithuania) Marius Žaromskis

Russia

- (Russia) Maxim Grishin
- (Russia) Aleksei Oleinik

Sweden

- (Sweden) Niklas Bäckström
- (Sweden) Alexander Gustafsson

Turkey

- (Turkey) Ibragim Chuzhigaev
- (Turkey) Aziz Karaoglu

Other

- (Romania) Diana Belbiţă
- (Austria) Jasminka Cive
- (South Africa) Dricus du Plessis
- (Switzerland) Yasubey Enomoto
- (Belarus) Andrey Gerasimchuk
- (Latvia) Konstantin Gluhov
- (Montenegro) Miloš Janičić
- (Argentina) Silvana Gómez Juárez
- (Bosnia and Herzegovina) Erko Jun
- (Canada) Mariusz Książkiewicz
- (Luxembourg) Yann Liasse
- (Suriname) Melvin Manhoef
- (Norway) Emil Weber Meek
- (Moldova) Valeriu Mircea
- (Democratic Republic of the Congo) Christian M'Pumbu
- (Northern Ireland) Norman Parke
- (Bulgaria) Jordan Radev
- (Angola) Jay Silva
- (Cameroon) Rameau Thierry Sokoudjou

== Broadcasting ==
Below is a list of official broadcasting of KSW:

Country/Region	Broadcasters	
Country/Region	Cable/Pay television	PPV
Poland	Canal+	—N/a
Czech Republic/Slovakia	Nova Sport	—N/a
France	RMC Sport	—N/a
Rest of World	—N/a	KSWTV.com
