= Maciej Jewtuszko =

Polish mixed martial arts fighter

- Born: January 31, 1981 (age 45); Szczecin, Poland
- Other names: Irokez
- Nationality: Polish
- Height: 6 ft 0 in (1.83 m)
- Weight: 155 lb (70 kg; 11.1 st)
- Division: Welterweight; Lightweight
- Reach: 74.0 in (188 cm)
- Stance: Southpaw
- Fighting out of: Szczecin, Poland
- Team: Berserker's Team; Nak Muay Szczecin; Linke Gold Team
- Trainer: Mariusz Linke; Piotr Bagiński
- Rank: Second degree purple belt in Brazilian Jiu-Jitsu
- Years active: 2005-2024

Mixed martial arts record
- Total: 18
- Wins: 13
- By knockout: 6
- By submission: 6
- By decision: 1
- Losses: 5
- By knockout: 2
- By decision: 3

Other information
- Mixed martial arts record from Sherdog

Maciej Jewtuszko (born January 31, 1981) is a Polish retired mixed martial artist who competed in the Lightweight and Welterweight divisions. A professional from 2005 till 2024, he had fought in the UFC, WEC, and KSW, where he was the former KSW Lightweight Champion.

== Background ==
Jewtuszko comes from a Muay Thai and Brazilian Jiu-Jitsu background. He is currently ranked as the #2 Polish lightweight mixed martial artist by mmarocks.pl

Jewtuszko has fought for promotions in Poland and Germany, as well as the Dutch promotion BOTE, one of the largest MMA promotions in Europe, defeating solid opponents like Edvardas Norkeliunas and Grzegorz Trędowski. After going 7-0 (never out of the second round), Jewtuszko attracted the attention of larger promotions. Maciej has also competed in the sport of Muay Thai.

== Mixed martial arts career ==
=== World Extreme Cagefighting ===
Jewtuszko then signed for the WEC and made his debut at WEC 50 - where he was regarded as a heavy underdog - against Anthony Njokuani. Jewtuszko went on to defeat his opponent via TKO (punches) early in the first round. By doing so, he was awarded the Knockout of the Night bonus. Maciej was scheduled to make his second World Extreme Cagefighting appearance against Ricardo Lamas at WEC 53, but had to withdraw as he suffered a broken hand during training.

=== Ultimate Fighting Championship ===
In October 2010, World Extreme Cagefighting merged with the Ultimate Fighting Championship. As part of the merger, all WEC fighters were transferred to the UFC.

Jewtuszko faced Curt Warburton on February 27, 2011, at UFC 127 and suffered his first loss of his professional career via unanimous decision. After the loss, Jewtuszko was released from the promotion.

=== Konfrontacja Sztuk Walki ===
In September 2011, he signed a contract with the largest Polish MMA organization, Konfrontacja Sztuk Walki. On November 26, 2011, during the KSW 17: Revenge, despite being the favorite, he lost to Artur Sowiński in the 1st round by knockout.

On February 25, 2012, he defeated the Ultimate Fighter contestant Dean Amasinger by TKO in the 1st round at the KSW 18. For this victory, he received a financial bonus for the "knockout of the evening". In the same year - on December 1, he fought a rematch with Artur Sowiński at the KSW 21 for the KSW Lightweight Championship, in which he defeated Sowiński after a spectacular fight in the 2nd round by choking him unconscious via D'arce choke.

After defeating Vaso Bakočević in a non-title bout at KSW 28: Fighters Den, in 2015, he vacated the lightweight championship belt, changing the weight category to welterweight (-77 kg). In the first fight in the welterweight division at KSW 31: Materla vs. Drwal, he lost to former PLMMA champion Kamil Szymuszowski by unanimous decision, who was a replacement for the injured Robert Radomski.

At the KSW 34: New Order, which took place on March 5, 2016 in Warsaw, he faced the experienced Krzysztof Kułak, winning after Kułak submitted to ground and pound in the second round.

On October 22, 2017 at KSW 40: Dublin in the capital of Ireland, he crossed gloves with the contender for the KSW welterweight title, David Zawada. After a dynamic fight focused mainly on stand up, he lost by unanimous decision of the judges.

=== Fight in FEN ===
In January 2019, it was announced that he had signed a contract with Fight Exclusive Night. In his debut, he was supposed to face Norman Parke, but the fight did not take place. On June 15, 2019, he made his debut in the main event of the FEN 25, which took place at the Amphitheater in Ostróda, he rematched with Vaso Bakočević. The competitor from Montenegro successfully took revenge on the "Iroquois", defeating him by technical knockout when he did not advance to the next round due to a knee injury.

Jewtuszko returned five years later to face Marius Žaromskis in a retirement bout for both men on March 16, 2024 at KSW 92: Wikłacz vs. Jojua, winning the bout via unanimous decision, for the first time in his career.

== Personal life ==
Maciej is a firefighter in his hometown of Szczecin, Poland.

== Championships and accomplishments ==
- Konfrontacja Sztuk Walki
  - KSW Lightweight Championship (One time)
  - Knockout of the Night (Two times) vs. Dean Amasinger, Vaso Bakocevic
- World Extreme Cagefighting
  - Knockout of the Night (One time) vs. Anthony Njokuani

== Mixed martial arts record ==
Professional record breakdown
18 matches	13 wins	5 losses
By knockout	6	2
By submission	6	0
By decision	1	3

Res.	Record	Opponent	Method	Event	Date	Round	Time	Location	Notes
Win	13–5	Marius Žaromskis	Decision (unanimous)	KSW 92	March 16, 2024	3	5:00	Gorzów Wielkopolski, Poland	
Loss	12–5	Vaso Bakočević	TKO (leg injury)	Fight Exclusive Night 25	Jun 15, 2019	1	5:00	Ostroda, Poland	
Loss	12–4	David Zawada	Decision (unanimous)	KSW 40	October 22, 2017	3	5:00	Dublin, Ireland	
Win	12–3	Krzysztof Kułak	TKO (submission to punches)	KSW 34	March 5, 2016	2	2:18	Warsaw, Poland	
Loss	11–3	Kamil Szymuszowski	Decision (unanimous)	KSW 31	May 23, 2015	3	5:00	Gdańsk, Poland	Welterweight debut.
Win	11–2	Vaso Bakočević	KO (knee to the body)	KSW 28	October 4, 2014	3	3:00	Szczecin, Poland	Non-title bout. Knockout of the Night.
Win	10–2	Artur Sowiński	Submission (brabo choke)	KSW 21	December 1, 2012	2	4:01	Warsaw, Poland	Won the inaugural KSW Lightweight Championship.
Win	9–2	Dean Amasinger	TKO (punches)	KSW 18	February 25, 2012	1	3:39	Płock, Poland	Knockout of the Night.
Loss	8–2	Artur Sowiński	KO (punches)	KSW 17	November 26, 2011	1	0:46	Łódź, Poland	
Loss	8–1	Curt Warburton	Decision (unanimous)	UFC 127	February 27, 2011	3	5:00	Sydney, Australia	
Win	8–0	Anthony Njokuani	TKO (punches)	WEC 50	August 18, 2010	1	1:35	Las Vegas, United States	Knockout of the Night.
Win	7–0	Edvardas Norkeliunas	Submission (heel hook)	Beast of the East: Grabowski vs Kita	June 12, 2010	1	3:42	Gdynia, Poland	
Win	6–0	Erikas Petraitis	KO (punches)	Iron Fist 2	May 14, 2010	1	1:38	Szczecin, Poland	
Win	5–0	Grzegorz Tredowski	Submission (guillotine choke)	Beast of the East: Gdynia	November 14, 2009	2	0:37	Gdynia, Poland	
Win	4–0	Maros Nagy	TKO (corner stoppage)	Fight Club Berlin 13	April 5, 2009	2	5:00	Berlin, Germany	
Win	3–0	Tomas Pallai	Submission (rear-naked choke)	Fight Club Berlin 12	November 2, 2008	1	1:37	Berlin, Germany	
Win	2–0	Adam Lazowski	TKO (soccer kicks)	Extreme Cage 2	November 19, 2006	1	4:57	Warsaw, Poland	
Win	1–0	Dainius Krishtopaitis	Submission (armbar)	La Onda: Germany vs. Lithuania	December 4, 2005	1	N/A	Magdeburg, Germany	Lightweight debut.

== See also ==
- List of current mixed martial arts champions
- List of male mixed martial artists
