= 2017 in Konfrontacja Sztuk Walki =

Mixed martial arts events

Information
- First date: April 7, 2017
- Last date: December 23, 2017

Events
- Total events: 4

Fights
- Total fights: 37
- Title fights: 7

Chronology
2016 in KSW	2017 in Konfrontacja Sztuk Walki	2018 in KSW

The year 2017 was the 14th year in the history of the Konfrontacja Sztuk Walki, a mixed martial arts promotion based in Poland. 2017 began with KSW 38.

== List of events ==
#	Event title	Date	Arena	Location
1	KSW 38: Live in Studio	April 7, 2017	Studio Apricor	Warsaw, Poland
2	KSW 39: Colosseum	May 27, 2017	The PGE Narodowy	Warsaw, Poland
3	KSW 40: Dublin	October 22, 2017	3Arena	(Republic of Ireland) Dublin, Ireland
4	KSW 41	December 23, 2017	Spodek	Katowice, Poland

== Title fights ==
Title fights in 2017
#	Weight Class				Method	Round	Time	Event	Notes
1	Women's Flyweight 57 kg	(Brazil) Ariane Lipski	def.	(Romania) Diana Belbiţă	Submission (Armbar)	1	4:52	KSW 39	For the Inaugural KSW Women's Flyweight Championship
2	Featherweight 66 kg	(Japan) Kleber Koike Erbst	def.	(Poland) Marcin Wrzosek (c)	Decision (Unanimous)	3	5:00	KSW 39	For the KSW Featherweight Championship
3	Lightweight 70 kg	(Poland) Mateusz Gamrot (c)	def.	(Northern Ireland) Norman Parke	Decision (Unanimous)	3	5:00	KSW 39	For the KSW Lightweight Championship
4	Light Heavyweight 93 kg	(Poland) Tomasz Narkun(c)	def.	(Poland) Marcin Wójcik	Submission (Triangle Choke)	1	4:59	KSW 39	For the KSW Light Heavyweight Championship
5	Heavyweight 120 kg	(Poland) Marcin Rozalski	def.	(Brazil) Fernando Rodrigues Jr (c)	KO (Punch)	1	0:16	KSW 39	For the KSW Heavyweight Championship
6	Women's Flyweight 57 kg	(Brazil) Ariane Lipski (c)	def.	(Brazil) Mariana Morais	Submission (Rear-Naked Choke)	1	0:58	KSW 40	For the KSW Women's Flyweight Championship
7	Welterweight77 kg	(Croatia) Roberto Soldić	def.	(Poland) Borys Mańkowski (c)	TKO (Corner Stoppage)	3	5:00	KSW 41	For the KSW Welterweight Championship

== KSW 38: Live in Studio ==
KSW 38: Live in Studio
- Promotion: Konfrontacja Sztuk Walki
- Date: April 7, 2017
- Venue: Studio Apricor
- City: Warsaw, Poland
- Attendance: 300

Event chronology
KSW 37	KSW 38: Live in Studio	KSW 39

KSW 38: Live in Studio was a mixed martial arts event held by Konfrontacja Sztuk Walki on April 7, 2017, at the Studio Apricor in Warsaw, Poland.

=== Background ===
==== Bonus awards ====
The following fighters were awarded bonuses:

- Fight of the Night: Anzor Azhiev vs. Kamil Selwa
- Knockout of the Night: Maciej Kazieczko
- Submission of the Night: Artur Sowiński
- Performance of the Night: Grzegorz Szulakowski

=== Results ===
KSW 38
Weight Class				Method	Round	Time	Notes
Featherweight 66 kg	(Poland) Artur Sowiński	def.	(Poland) Łukasz Chlewicki	Submission (Triangle Choke)	1	1:51	
Middleweight 84 kg	(Poland) Łukasz Bieńkowski	def.	(Poland) Antoni Chmielewski	Decision (Unanimous)	3	5:00	
Featherweight 66 kg	(Poland) Roman Szymański	def.	(Brazil) Denilson Neves de Oliveira	Decision (Unanimous)	3	5:00	
Bantamweight 61 kg	(Russia) Anzor Azhiev	def.	(Poland) Kamil Selwa	Decision (Unanimous)	3	5:00	
Lightweight 70 kg	(Poland) Kamil Szymuszowski	def.	(Poland) Gracjan Szadziński	Decision (Majority)	3	5:00	
Lightweight 70 kg	(Poland) Grzegorz Szulakowski	def.	(Brazil) Renato Gomes	TKO (Elbows)	3	4:19	
Featherweight 66 kg	(Poland) Łukasz Rajewski	def.	(Poland) Sebastian Romanowski	Decision (Unanimous)	3	5:00	
Lightweight 70 kg	(Poland) Maciej Kazieczko	def.	(Poland) Tomasz Matusewicz	TKO (Punches)	1	1:10	

== KSW 39: Colosseum ==
KSW 39: Colosseum
- Promotion: Konfrontacja Sztuk Walki
- Date: May 27, 2017
- Venue: The PGE Narodowy
- City: Warsaw, Poland
- Attendance: 57,776

Event chronology
KSW 38	KSW 39: Colosseum	KSW 40

KSW 39: Colosseum was a mixed martial arts event held by Konfrontacja Sztuk Walki on May 27, 2017, at the PGE Narodowy in Warsaw, Poland.

=== Background ===
Former KSW Heavyweight Champion, Karol Bedorf, tore his Achilles' tendon and was unable to fight Michal Kita. He was replaced by Michał Andryszak.

KSW 39 became the 2nd highest MMA attendance record with 57,776, behind only the Pride FC: Shockwave event from 2002. It also beat UFC 193 attendance.

==== Bonus awards ====
The following fighters were awarded bonuses:

- Fight of the Night: Mamed Khalidov vs. Borys Mańkowski
- Knockout of the Night: Marcin Rozalski
- Submission of the Night: Michał Andryszak

=== Results ===
KSW 39
Weight Class				Method	Round	Time	Notes
Catchweight	(Poland) Mamed Khalidov (c)	def.	(Poland) Borys Mańkowski (c)	Decision (Unanimous)	3	5:00	Champion vs. Champion
Heavyweight 120 kg	(Poland) Mariusz Pudzianowski	def.	(Poland) Tyberiusz Kowalczyk	TKO (Submission to elbows strikes)	2	2:50	
Heavyweight 120 kg	(Poland) Marcin Rozalski	def.	(Brazil) Fernando Rodrigues Jr (c)	KO (Punch)	1	0:16	For the KSW Heavyweight Championship
Heavyweight 120 kg	(Poland) Paweł "Popek" Rak	def.	(Lithuania) Robert Burneika	Submission (Punches)	1	0:45	
Light Heavyweight 93 kg	(Poland) Tomasz Narkun (c)	def.	(Poland) Marcin Wójcik	Submission (Triangle Choke)	1	4:59	For the KSW Light Heavyweight Championship
Heavyweight 120 kg	(Poland) Michał Andryszak	def.	(Poland) Michał Kita	Submission (Anaconda Choke)	1	1:14	
Lightweight 70 kg	(Poland) Mateusz Gamrot (c)	def.	(Northern Ireland) Norman Parke	Decision (Unanimous)	3	5:00	For the KSW Lightweight Championship
Light Heavyweight 93 kg	(Poland) Lukasz Jurkowski	def.	(Cameroon) R. Sokoudjou	Decision (Split)	3	5:00	
Featherweight 66 kg	(Japan) Kleber Koike Erbst	def.	(Poland) Marcin Wrzosek (c)	Decision (Unanimous)	3	5:00	For the KSW Featherweight Championship
Middleweight 84 kg	(Poland) Damian Janikowski	def.	(United States) Julio Gallegos	TKO (Knee and Punches)	1	1:26	
Women's Flyweight 57 kg	(Brazil) Ariane Lipski	def.	(Romania) Diana Belbiţă	Submission (Armbar)	1	4:52	For the inaugural KSW Women's Flyweight Championship

== KSW 40: Dublin ==
KSW 40: Dublin
- Promotion: Konfrontacja Sztuk Walki
- Date: October 22, 2017
- Venue: 3Arena
- City: (Republic of Ireland) Dublin, Ireland

Event chronology
KSW 39	KSW 40: Dublin	KSW 41

KSW 40: Dublin was a mixed martial arts event held by Konfrontacja Sztuk Walki on October 22, 2017, at the 3Arena in Dublin, Ireland.

=== Background ===
Anzor Azhiev was not able to fight due to food poisoning. Debutant Paweł Polityło faced Antun Račić.

Norman Parke missed his weight, at 70.8 kg. The fight between Parke and Gamrot was therefore a non-title fight. Parke was fined 30% of his purse for missing weight.

James McSweeney was not permitted to fight after he was not cleared by Safe MMA Ireland. Jay Silva stepped in as a replacement against Mariusz Pudzianowski in the main event.

==== Bonus awards ====
The following fighters were awarded bonuses:

- Fight of the Night: David Zawada vs. Maciej Jewtuszko
- Knockout of the Night: Michał Materla
- Submission of the Night: Ariane Lipski

=== Results ===
KSW 40
Weight Class				Method	Round	Time	Notes
Heavyweight 120 kg	(Poland) Mariusz Pudzianowski	def.	(Angola) Jay Silva	Decision (Majority)	3	5:00	
Lightweight 70 kg	(Poland) Mateusz Gamrot (c)	vs.	(Northern Ireland) Norman Parke	No Contest (Accidental Eye Poke)	2	4:39	
Middleweight 84 kg	(Poland) Michał Materla	def.	(Brazil) Paulo Thiago	TKO (Punches)	2	0:50	
Women's Flyweight 57 kg	(Brazil) Ariane Lipski (c)	def.	(Brazil) Mariana Morais	Submission (Rear-Naked Choke)	1	0:58	For the KSW Women's Flyweight Championship
Welterweight 77 kg	(Germany) David Zawada	def.	(Poland) Maciej Jewtuszko	Decision (Unanimous)	3	5:00	
Light Heavyweight 93 kg	(Republic of Ireland) Chris Fields	def.	(Poland) Michał Fijałka	Decision (Unanimous)	3	5:00	
Featherweight 66 kg	(Republic of Ireland) Paul Redmond	def.	(Poland) Łukasz Chlewicki	Decision (Split)	3	5:00	
Welterweight 77 kg	(Republic of Ireland) Paul Lawrence	def.	(Poland) Konrad Iwanowski	Decision (Split)	3	5:00	
Bantamweight 61 kg	(Croatia) Antun Račić	def.	(Poland) Paweł Polityło	Decision (Split)	3	5:00	

== KSW 41: Mankowski vs. Soldic ==
KSW 41: Mankowski vs. Soldic
- Promotion: Konfrontacja Sztuk Walki
- Date: December 23, 2017
- Venue: Spodek
- City: Katowice, Poland

Event chronology
KSW 40	KSW 41: Mankowski vs. Soldic	KSW 42

KSW 41: Mankowski vs. Soldic was a mixed martial arts event held by Konfrontacja Sztuk Walki on December 23, 2017, at the Spodek in Katowice, Poland.

=== Background ===
Dricus du Plessis is out of the KSW 41 main event due to a hand injury and Borys Mankowski will defend his welterweight title against Roberto Soldic.

Kleber Koike Erbst didn't make weight, the KSW featherweight belt is vacated. Artur Sowiński fights for the vacant featherweight title.

==== Bonus awards ====
The following fighters were awarded bonuses:

- Fight of the Night: Marcin Wrzosek vs. Roman Szymański
- Knockout of the Night: Michał Andryszak
- Submission of the Night: Grzegorz Szulakowski

=== Results ===
KSW 41
Weight Class				Method	Round	Time	Notes
Welterweight 77 kg	(Croatia) Roberto Soldić	def.	(Poland) Borys Mańkowski (c)	TKO (Corner Stoppage)	3	5:00	For the KSW Welterweight Championship
Heavyweight 120 kg	(Poland) Tomasz Oświeciński	def.	(Poland) Paweł "Popek" Rak	TKO (Punches)	2	1:58	
Featherweight 66 kg	(Japan) Kleber Koike Erbst	def.	(Poland) Artur Sowiński	Submission (Rear Naked Choke)	3	3:56	
Featherweight 66 kg	(Poland) Marcin Wrzosek	def.	(Poland) Roman Szymański	Decision (Unanimous)	3	5:00	
Heavyweight 120 kg	(Poland) Michał Andryszak	def.	(Brazil) Fernando Rodrigues Jr	KO (Punches)	1	0:26	
Middleweight 84 kg	(Poland) Damian Janikowski	def.	(Poland) Antoni Chmielewski	TKO (Punches)	2	2:33	
Lightweight 70 kg	(Poland) Grzegorz Szulakowski	def.	(Poland) Kamil Szymuszowski	Submission (Heel Hook)	1	3:33	
Featherweight 66 kg	(France) Salahdine Parnasse	def.	(Poland) Lukasz Rajewski	Decision (Unanimous)	3	5:00	
Lightweight 70 kg	(Poland) Gracjan Szadziński	def.	(Poland) Maciej Kazieczko	TKO (Punches)	1	4:59	
