= 2016 in Konfrontacja Sztuk Walki =

Mixed martial arts events

Information
- First date: March 5, 2016
- Last date: December 3, 2016

Events
- Total events: 4

Fights
- Title fights: 10

Chronology
2015 in KSW	2016 in Konfrontacja Sztuk Walki	2017 in KSW

The year 2016 was the thirteenth year in the history of the Konfrontacja Sztuk Walki, a mixed martial arts promotion based in Poland. In 2016 Konfrontacja Sztuk Walki held 4 events beginning with, KSW 34: New Order .

== List of events ==
#	Event title	Date	Arena	Location
1	KSW 34: New Order	March 5, 2016	Torwar Hall	Warsaw, Poland
2	KSW 35: Khalidov vs. Karaoglu	May 27, 2016	Ergo Arena	Gdańsk, Poland
3	KSW 36: Materla vs. Palhares	October 1, 2016	Hala CRS	Zielona Góra, Poland
4	KSW 37: Circus of Pain	December 3, 2016	Tauron Arena	Kraków, Poland

== Title fights ==
Title fights in 2016
#	Weight Class				Method	Round	Time	Event	Notes
1	Featherweight 66 kg	(Poland) Artur Sowiński (c)	def.	(Brazil) Fabiano Silva	Decision (Unanimous)	3	5:00	KSW 34	For the KSW Featherweight Championship
2	Light Heavyweight 93 kg	(Poland) Tomasz Narkun (c)	def.	(Brazil) Cassio de Oliveira	TKO (Flying Knee and Punches)	1	1:46	KSW 34	For the KSW Light Heavyweight Championship
3	Heavyweight 120 kg	(Poland) Karol Bedorf (c)	def.	(England) James McSweeney	TKO (Punches and Elbows)	1	3:33	KSW 34	For the KSW Heavyweight Championship
4	Lightweight 70 kg	(Poland) Mateusz Gamrot	def.	(France) Mansour Barnaoui	Decision (Unanimous)	3	5:00	KSW 35	For the Vacant KSW Lightweight Championship
5	Middleweight 84 kg	(Poland) Mamed Khalidov (c)	def.	(Turkey) Aziz Karaoglu	Decision (majority)	3	5:00	KSW 35	For the KSW Middleweight Championship
6	Lightweight 70 kg	(Poland) Mateusz Gamrot (c)	def.	(Brazil) Renato Gomes	Submission (Heel Hook)	2	4:01	KSW 36	For the KSW Lightweight Championship
7	Light Heavyweight 93 kg	(Poland) Tomasz Narkun (c)	def.	(Cameroon) R. Sokoudjou	TKO (Punches)	1	4:38	KSW 36	For the KSW Light Heavyweight Championship
8	Featherweight 66 kg	(Poland) Marcin Wrzosek	def.	(Poland) Artur Sowiński (c)	TKO (Doctor Stoppage)	2	2:55	KSW 37	For the KSW Featherweight Championship
9	Welterweight 77 kg	(Poland) Borys Mańkowski (c)	def.	(England) John Maguire	Decision (Unanimous)	3	5:00	KSW 37	For the KSW Welterweight Championship
10	Heavyweight 120 kg	(Brazil) Fernando Rodrigues Jr.	def.	(Poland) Karol Bedorf (c)	TKO (Punches)	2	2:34	KSW 37	For the KSW Heavyweight Championship

== KSW 34: New Order ==
KSW 34: New Order
- Promotion: Konfrontacja Sztuk Walki
- Date: March 5, 2016
- Venue: Torwar
- City: Warsaw, Poland
- Attendance: 4,875

Event chronology
KSW 33	KSW 34: New Order	KSW 35

KSW 34: New Order was a mixed martial arts event held on March 5, 2016, at the Torwar in Warsaw, Poland.

=== Background ===
This promotional event was the first of 2016 and was aired on the free TV channel Polsat. Future events in this year will appear on PPV in Poland and the web platform KSW TV worldwide.

Owners of Konfrontacja Sztuk Walki announced that Tomasz Narkun was expected to face Andre Muniz in his first title defense. On February 25, it was announced that Muniz withdrew from the bout due to elbow injury and was replaced by Cassio Barbosa de Oliveira who defeated UFC veteran Ronny Markes two weeks earlier at Shooto Brazil 61.

Łukasz Bieńkowski was expected to face Svetlozar Savov, but on March 1, it was announced that Bieńkowski pulled out due to injury and Antoni Chmielewski (who was planning to take part in PLMMA 64 on March 18, 2016) was added as a 'last minute' replacement.

One of the scheduled opening fights on the card was a match-up between Grzegorz Szulakowski and Bartłomiej Kurczewski. Szulakowski had to pull out due to an arm injury and there was no replacement for him, so the bout was deleted from the card.

Bonuses:

- Fight of the Night: Karol Bedorf vs. James McSweeney
- Performance of the Night: Tomasz Narkun and Antoni Chmielewski

=== Results ===
Fight Card
Weight Class				Method	Round	Time	Notes
Heavyweight 120 kg	(Poland) Karol Bedorf (c)	def.	(England) James McSweeney	TKO (Punches and Elbows)	1	3:33	For the KSW Heavyweight Championship.
Light Heavyweight 93 kg	(Poland) Tomasz Narkun (c)	def.	(Brazil) Cassio de Oliveira	TKO (Flying Knee and Punches)	1	1:46	For the KSW Light Heavyweight Championship.
Featherweight 66 kg	(Poland) Artur Sowiński (c)	def.	(Brazil) Fabiano Silva	Decision (Unanimous)	3	5:00	For the KSW Featherweight Championship.
Welterweight 77 kg	(Russia) Asłambek Saidow	def.	(Switzerland) Yasubey Enomoto	Decision (Unanimous)	3	5:00	
Middleweight 84 kg	(Poland) Antoni Chmielewski	def.	(Bulgaria) Svetlozar Savov	TKO (Slam and Punches)	1	1:42	
Welterweight 77 kg	(Poland) Maciej Jewtuszko	def.	(Poland) Krzysztof Kułak	TKO (Submission to punches)	2	2:18	
Heavyweight 120 kg	(Poland) Szymon Bajor	def.	(Poland) Jędrzej Maćkowiak	Decision (Unanimous)	3	5:00	
Light Heavyweight 93 kg	(Poland) Marcin Wójcik	def.	(Poland) Tomasz Kondraciuk	TKO (Punches)	2	1:31	

== KSW 35: Khalidov vs. Karaoglu ==
KSW 35: Khalidov vs. Karaoglu
- Promotion: Konfrontacja Sztuk Walki
- Date: May 27, 2016
- Venue: Ergo Arena
- City: Gdańsk / Sopot, Poland
- Attendance: 11,013

Event chronology
KSW 34	KSW 35: Khalidov vs. Karaoglu	KSW 36

KSW 35 was a mixed martial arts event held on May 27, 2016, at the Ergo Arena in Gdańsk / Sopot, Poland

=== Background ===
The event was initially planned for May 28 but was rescheduled due to a conflict with Polsat's music show Polsat SuperHit Festival 2016 .

This event appeared on PPV (after two opening fights) in Poland and KSW TV worldwide. The Polish organization announced that KSW 35 will be the first event broadcast in VR 360° technology which will be an innovation broadcasting MMA events.

Former UFC fighter and TUF competitor Marcin Wrzosek was expected to face Anzor Azhiev in featherweight title eliminator, but April 1, 2016 KSW announced that Azhiev is injured and Filip Wolański will replace him.

Lukasz Chlewick was expected to fight Marif Piraev, however Piraev was pulled out on May 23. He was replaced by Welsh fighter Azi Thomas.

=== Results ===
Fight Card
Weight Class				Method	Round	Time	Notes
Middleweight 84 kg	(Poland) Mamed Khalidov (c)	def.	(Turkey) Aziz Karaoglu	Decision (majority)	3	5:00	For the KSW Middleweight Championship.
Middleweight 84 kg	(Poland) Michał Materla	def.	(Poland) Antoni Chmielewski	TKO (Punches)	1	4:12	
Heavyweight 120 kg	(Poland) Marcin Różalski	def.	(Poland) Mariusz Pudzianowski	Submission (Guillotine Choke)	2	1:46	
Lightweight 70 kg	(Poland) Mateusz Gamrot	def.	(France) Mansour Barnaoui	Decision (Unanimous)	3	5:00	For the Vacant KSW Lightweight Championship.
Lightweight 70 kg	(Poland) Łukasz Chlewicki	def.	(Wales) Azi Thomas	Decision (Unanimous)	3	5:00	
Welterweight 77 kg	(Poland) Rafał Moks	def.	(Poland) Robert Radomski	Decision (Split)	3	5:00	
Welterweight 77 kg	(Poland) Kamil Szymuszowski	def.	(Lithuania) Mindaugas Verzbickas	Decision (Unanimous)	3	5:00	
Featherweight 66 kg	(Poland) Marcin Wrzosek	def.	(Poland) Filip Wolański	Decision (Unanimous)	3	5:00	
Light Heavyweight 93 kg	(Poland) Marcin Wójcik	def.	(Poland) Michal Fijalka	Decision (Unanimous)	3	5:00	

== KSW 36: Materla vs. Palhares ==
KSW 36: Materla vs. Palhares
- Promotion: Konfrontacja Sztuk Walki
- Date: October 1, 2016
- Venue: Hala CRS
- City: Zielona Góra, Poland
- Attendance: 5,693

Event chronology
KSW 35	KSW 36: Materla vs. Palhares	KSW 37

KSW 36 was a mixed martial arts event held on October 1, 2016, at the Hala CRS in Zielona Góra, Poland

=== Results ===
Fight Card
Weight Class				Method	Round	Time	Notes
Middleweight 84 kg	(Poland) Michał Materla	def.	(Brazil) Rousimar Palhares	KO (Punches)	2	1:27	
Light Heavyweight 93 kg	(Poland) Tomasz Narkun (c)	def.	(Cameroon) R. Sokoudjou	TKO (Punches)	1	4:38	For the KSW Light Heavyweight Championship
Lightweight 70 kg	(Poland) Mateusz Gamrot (c)	def.	(Brazil) Renato Gomes	Submission (Heel Hook)	2	4:01	For the KSW Lightweight Championship
Female Flyweight 57 kg	(Brazil) Ariane Lipski	def.	(Germany) Sheila Gaff	TKO (Punches)	1	2:09	
Heavyweight 120 kg	(Poland) Michal Kita	def.	(Poland) Michal Wlodarek	Submission (Guillotine Choke)	1	4:47	
Featherweight 66 kg	(Japan) Kleber Koike Erbst	def.	(Poland) Leszek Krakowski	Submission (Triangle Choke)	1	4:24	
Lightweight 70 kg	(Poland) Maciej Kazieczko	def.	(Poland) Mariusz Mazur	Decision (Unanimous)	3	5:00	
Female Flyweight 57 kg	(Romania) Diana Belbiţă	def.	(Poland) Katarzyna Lubonska	Decision (Unanimous)	3	5:00	
Lightweight 70 kg	(Poland) Grzegorz Szulakowski	def.	(Poland) Bartlomiej Kurczewski	Decision (Unanimous)	3	5:00	

== KSW 37: Circus of Pain ==
KSW 37: Circus of Pain
- Promotion: Konfrontacja Sztuk Walki
- Date: December 3, 2016
- Venue: Tauron Arena
- City: Kraków, Poland
- Attendance: 18,000

Event chronology
KSW 36	KSW 37: Circus of Pain	KSW 38

KSW 37: Circus of Pain is a mixed martial arts event to be held on December 3, 2016, at the Tauron Arena in Kraków, Poland.

=== Background ===
Bonus awards:

The following fighters will be awarded bonuses:

- Fight of the Night: Roman Szymański vs. Sebastian Romanowski
- Knockout of the Night: Fernando Rodrigues Jr.
- Submission of the Night: Marcin Wójcik
- Performance of the Night: Marcin Wrzosek
- Performance of the Night: Borys Mańkowski

=== Results ===
Fight Card
Weight Class				Method	Round	Time	Notes
Heavyweight 120 kg	(Brazil) Fernando Rodrigues Jr.	def.	(Poland) Karol Bedorf (c)	TKO (Punches)	2	2:34	For the KSW Heavyweight Championship
Heavyweight 120 kg	(Poland) Mariusz Pudzianowski	def.	(Poland) Paweł "Popek" Rak	TKO (Punches)	1	1:20	
Welterweight 77 kg	(Poland) Borys Mańkowski (c)	def.	(England) John Maguire	Decision (Unanimous)	3	5:00	For the KSW Welterweight Championship
Featherweight 66 kg	(Poland) Marcin Wrzosek	def.	(Poland) Artur Sowiński (c)	TKO (Doctor Stoppage)	2	2:55	For the KSW Featherweight Championship
Lightweight 70 kg	(France) Mansour Barnaoui	def.	(Poland) Łukasz Chlewicki	TKO (Doctor Stoppage)	1	3:09	
Light Heavyweight 93 kg	(Poland) Marcin Wójcik	def.	(Poland) Marcin Łazarz	Submission (Rear-Naked Choke)	1	3:43	
Featherweight 66 kg	(Poland) Filip Wolański	def.	(Brazil) Denilson Neves de Oliveira	Decision (Split)	3	5:00	
Welterweight 77 kg	(Germany) David Zawada	def.	(Poland) Robert Radomski	TKO (Punches)	2	3:50	
Featherweight 66 kg	(Poland) Roman Szymański	def.	(Poland) Sebastian Romanowski	Submission (Rear-Naked Choke)	3	4:58	
