= Sheila Gaff =

German mixed martial arts fighter

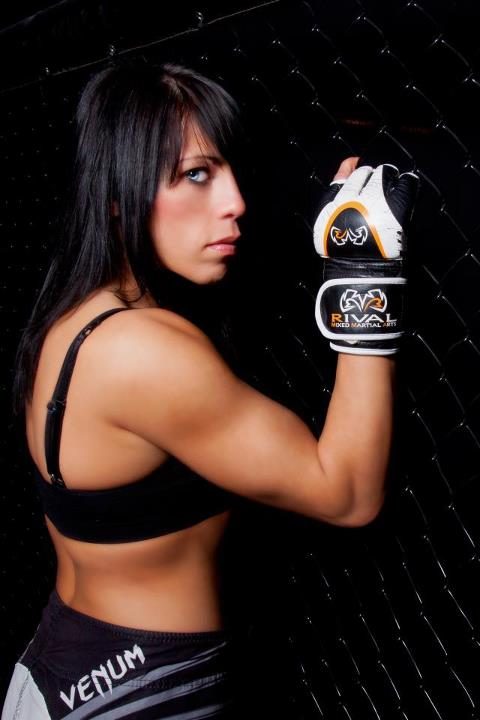
- Born: December 29, 1989 (age 36); Bad Hersfeld, West Germany
- Other names: The German Tank
- Nationality: German
- Height: 5 ft 5 in (165 cm)
- Weight: 135 lb (61 kg; 9.6 st)
- Division: Bantamweight; Flyweight; Featherweight; Strawweight
- Reach: 64 in (163 cm)
- Fighting out of: Offenbach am Main, Germany
- Team: Pyranha MMA
- Years active: 2006–present

Mixed martial arts record
- Total: 17
- Wins: 10
- By knockout: 5
- By submission: 5
- Losses: 7
- By knockout: 3
- By submission: 2
- By decision: 1
- By disqualification: 1

Other information
- Mixed martial arts record from Sherdog
- Last updated on: August 4, 2013

Sheila Gaff (December 29, 1989) is a German mixed martial artist, and was fighting in the bantamweight division of the Ultimate Fighting Championship but was released on August 12, 2013. Since May 14, 2015 she has been under contract with XFC. She is known for her berserker fighting style, which has resulted in most of her wins and losses coming via (T)KO stoppage within the first two minutes. Gaff has also worked a lot on her ground fighting, which led to successful participations in grappling tournaments. She is also known for being the first-ever woman released by UFC.

== Mixed martial arts career ==
Gaff made her mixed martial arts debut on September 2, 2006. She won six of her first eight fights over the next three years.

On March 27, 2010, Gaff competed in a one-night tournament at Upcoming Glory 7. She defeated Lena Buytendijk in the first round and lost to Romy Ruyssen later in the night.

Gaff faced Cindy Dandois two months later at M-1 Selection 2010: Western Europe Round 3. She was disqualified after landing an illegal knee early in the third round.

On February 26, 2011, Gaff dropped down to 125 pounds to face Hanna Sillen at The Zone FC 8: Inferno. She defeated Sillen by knockout in eight seconds.

=== Cage Warriors ===
Gaff made her Cage Warriors debut when she fought Ireland's Aisling Daly at Cage Warriors Fighting Championship 41 on April 24, 2011 in Kentish Town, London. She defeated Daly by TKO in the first round.

Gaff was then scheduled to face Angela Hayes at Cage Warriors: Fight Night 2, but had to pull out due to illness and was replaced by Aisling Daly.

Gaff next fought Jennifer Maia at Cage Warriors: Fight Night 4 as part of a four-woman flyweight tournament to crown the inaugural Cage Warriors women's flyweight champion. She defeated Maia via knockout in ten seconds. Gaff began the fight with a sucker punch instead of touching gloves.

Gaff was scheduled to face Rosi Sexton in the tournament final at Cage Warriors Fighting Championship 49 on October 27, 2012 in Cardiff, Wales. Voluntary Anti-Doping Association (VADA) drug testing was used in the weeks prior to the planned fight. However, the bout was cancelled on October 19 when Gaff withdrew due to illness.

=== Ultimate Fighting Championship ===
On March 1, 2013, German website groundandpound.de reported that Gaff had signed a 4-fight contract with the UFC to join the UFC women's bantamweight division. She faced Sara McMann at UFC 159 on April 27. Gaff lost the fight via TKO in the first round.

In her second fight with the promotion, Gaff faced Amanda Nunes at UFC 163 on August 3, 2013. She lost the fight via TKO in the first round. On August 12, 2013 German MMA magazine GroundandPound reported her release from the UFC. She was also the first-ever woman released by UFC.

=== XFC ===
On April 14, 2015 Gaff signed a 6-fight contract with XFC. She joins the Strawweight division of the organisation. Gaff debuted at XFCi 11 in Sao Paulo, Brazil on September 19, 2015 against Antonia Silvaneide. She won the fight via submission in Round 1.

=== KSW ===
After XFC closing operations for undetermined time, Gaff signed a 1-fight contract with Polish organization KSW. She faced Brazilian prospect Ariane Lipski at her debut at KSW 36. She lost via knockout in the first round.

== Mixed martial arts record ==
Professional record breakdown
17 matches	10 wins	7 losses
By knockout	5	3
By submission	5	2
By decision	0	1
By disqualification	0	1

Res.	Record	Opponent	Method	Event	Date	Round	Time	Location	Notes
Win	10–7	Milena Bojić	TKO (punches)	Dynasty Fighting Championship	February 23, 2019	1	0:07	Frankfurt, Germany	
Loss	9–7	Ariane Lipski	KO (punches)	KSW 36	October 1, 2016	1	2:09	Lubusz Voivodeship, Poland	
Win	9–6	Antonia Silvaneide	Submission (armbar)	XFCi 11	September 19, 2015	1	4:46	São Paulo, Brazil	XFCi Women's Strawweight Tournament Quarterfinal
Loss	8–6	Amanda Nunes	TKO (punches and elbows)	UFC 163	August 3, 2013	1	2:08	Rio de Janeiro, Brazil	
Loss	8–5	Sara McMann	TKO (punches)	UFC 159	April 27, 2013	1	4:06	Newark, New Jersey, United States	
Win	8–4	Jennifer Maia	KO (punches)	Cage Warriors Fight Night 4	March 16, 2012	1	0:10	Dubai, United Arab Emirates	CWFC Women's Flyweight Tournament Semifinal
Win	7–4	Aisling Daly	TKO (knees and punches)	Cage Warriors 41	April 24, 2011	1	1:34	Kentish Town, North London, England	
Win	6–4	Hanna Sillen	KO (punches)	The Zone FC 8: Inferno	February 26, 2011	1	0:08	Gothenburg, Sweden	
Loss	5–4	Milana Dudieva	Decision (unanimous)	ProFC 22	December 17, 2010	3	5:00	Rostov-on-Don, Russia	
Loss	5–3	Cindy Dandois	DQ (illegal knee to the head)	M-1 Selection 2010: Western Europe Round 3	May 29, 2010	3	0:10	Helsinki, Finland	
Loss	5–2	Romy Ruyssen	Submission (armbar)	Upcoming Glory 7	March 27, 2010	1	1:08	Overijssel, Netherlands	
Win	5–1	Lena Buytendijk	Submission (armbar)	Upcoming Glory 7	March 27, 2010	1	4:30	Overijssel, Netherlands	
Win	4–1	Alexandra Buch	Submission (heel hook)	MMA Berlin: Tournament 16	September 26, 2009	1	1:59	Berlin, Germany	
Win	3–1	Dalia Grakulskyte	Submission (rear-naked choke)	Night of Pain 2nd	September 12, 2009	1	1:26	Darmstadt, Germany	
Win	2–1	Tania Loureiro	TKO (Punches)	Hamburger Kafig - First Strike	December 9, 2008	1	0:30	Hamburg, Germany	
Win	1–1	Lydia Myska	Submission (armbar)	FCA: Fight Club Plauen	May 10, 2008	1	0:30	Plauen, Germany	
Loss	0–1	Majanka Lathouwers	Submission (rear-naked choke)	UFR: Mix Fight Gala	September 23, 2006	1	N/A	Neuwied, Germany	

=== Mixed martial arts amateur record ===
Amateur record breakdown		
4 matches	3 wins	0 losses
By knockout	2	0
By submission	1	0
Draws	1	

Res.	Record	Opponent	Method	Event	Date	Round	Time	Location	Notes
Win	3–0–1	Julie Larsen	Submission (armbar)	FG: Fight Night 2	January 24, 2009	1	1:04	Odense, Denmark	
Win	2–0–1	Katharina Albinus	TKO (punches)	FFA: New Talents 8	September 6, 2008	1	1:54	Eschwege, Germany	
Draw	1–0–1	Tania Loureiro	Draw	FFA: New Talents 6	September 1, 2007	2	5:00	Eschwege, Germany	
Win	1–0	Annett Sonntag	TKO (punches)	FFA: New Talents 2	September 2, 2006	1	1:20	Eschwege, Germany	
