= 2018 in Konfrontacja Sztuk Walki =

Mixed martial arts events

Information
- First date: March 3, 2018
- Last date: December 1, 2018

Events
- Total events: 5

Fights
- Total fights: 44
- Title fights: 7

Chronology
2017 in KSW	2018 in Konfrontacja Sztuk Walki	2019 in KSW

The year 2018 was the 15th year in the history of the Konfrontacja Sztuk Walki, a mixed martial arts promotion based in Poland. 2018 began with KSW 42.

== List of events ==
#	Event title	Date	Arena	Location
1	KSW 42: Khalidov vs. Narkun	March 3, 2018	Atlas Arena	Łódź, Poland
2	KSW 43: Soldić vs. Du Plessis	April 14, 2018	Centennial Hall	Wrocław, Poland
3	KSW 44: The Game	June 9, 2018	Ergo Arena	Gdańsk, Poland
4	KSW 45: The Return to Wembley	October 6, 2018	Wembley Arena	London, England
5	KSW 46: Narkun vs. Khalidov 2	December 1, 2018	Gliwice Arena	Gliwice, Poland

== Title fights ==
Title fights in 2018
#	Weight Class				Method	Round	Time	Event	Notes
1	Women's Flyweight 57 kg	(Brazil) Ariane Lipski (c)	def.	(Argentina) Silvana Gómez Juárez	Decision (Unanimous)	5	5:00	KSW 42: Khalidov vs. Narkun	For the KSW Women's Flyweight Championship
2	Lightweight 70 kg	(Poland) Mateusz Gamrot (c)	def.	(Poland) Grzegorz Szulakowski	Submission (Americana)	4	4:15	KSW 42: Khalidov vs. Narkun	For the KSW Lightweight Championship
3	Heavyweight 120 kg	(England) Phil De Fries	def.	(Poland) Michał Andryszak	TKO (Punches)	1	3:32	KSW 43: Soldić vs. Du Plessis	For the Vacant KSW Heavyweight Championship
4	Welterweight 77 kg	(South Africa) Dricus du Plessis	def.	(Croatia) Roberto Soldić (c)	KO (Punches)	2	1:38	KSW 43: Soldić vs. Du Plessis	For the KSW Welterweight Championship
5	Welterweight 77 kg	(Croatia) Roberto Soldić	def.	(South Africa) Dricus du Plessis(c)	TKO (punches)	3	2:33	KSW 45: The Return to Wembley	For the KSW Welterweight Championship
6	Heavyweight 120 kg	(England) Phil De Fries (c)	def.	(Poland) Karol Bedorf	Submission (Americana)	2	4:26	KSW 45: The Return to Wembley	For the KSW Heavyweight Championship
7	Featherweight 66 kg	(Poland) Mateusz Gamrot	def.	(Japan) Kleber Koike Erbst	Decision (Unanimous)	5	5:00	KSW 46: Narkun vs. Khalidov 2	For the Vacant KSW Featherweight Championship

== KSW 42: Khalidov vs. Narkun ==
KSW 42: Khalidov vs. Narkun
- Promotion: Konfrontacja Sztuk Walki
- Date: March 3, 2018
- Venue: Atlas Arena
- City: Łódź, Poland

Event chronology
KSW 41	KSW 42: Khalidov vs. Narkun	KSW 43

'KSW 42: Khalidov vs. Narkun' billed as being "champion vs. champion" was a mixed martial arts event held by Konfrontacja Sztuk Walki on March 3, 2018, at the Atlas Arena in Łódź, Poland.

=== Background ===
Chris Fields did not reach Lodz because of storm Emma in Ireland, Iran's Hatef Moeil has stepped in to replace the Irishman and the contest has been switched to heavyweight.

Bonus awards

The following fighters were awarded bonuses:

- Fight of the Night: Tomasz Narkun vs. Mamed Khalidov
- Knockout of the Night: Scott Askham
- Submission of the Night: Tomasz Narkun

=== Results ===
KSW 42
Weight Class				Method	Round	Time	Notes
Catchweight 93 kg	(Poland) Tomasz Narkun (c)	def.	(Poland) Mamed Khalidov (c)	Submission (Triangle Choke)	3	1:18	
Middleweight 84 kg	(England) Scott Askham	def.	(Poland) Michał Materla	KO (Kick to the Body and Head)	1	1:09	
Lightweight 70 kg	(Poland) Mateusz Gamrot (c)	def.	(Poland) Grzegorz Szulakowski	Submission (Americana)	4	4:15	For the KSW Lightweight Championship
Women's Flyweight 57 kg	(Brazil) Ariane Lipski (c)	def.	(Argentina) Silvana Gómez Juárez	Decision (Unanimous)	5	5:00	For the KSW Women's Flyweight Championship
Light Heavyweight 93 kg	(Germany) Martin Zawada	def.	(Poland) Lukasz Jurkowski	TKO (Corner Stoppage)	1	5:00	
Heavyweight 120 kg	(Poland) Marcin Wójcik	def.	(Iran) Hatef Moeil	TKO (Retirement)	2	5:00	
Women's Flyweight 57 kg	(Poland) Karolina Owczarz	def.	(Poland) Paulina Raszewska	Submission (Rear-Naked Choke)	1	1:00	
Featherweight 66 kg	(Poland) Filip Wolański	def.	(Poland) Bartłomiej Kopera	Decision (Unanimous)	3	5:00	
Welterweight 77 kg	(Poland) Krystian Kaszubowski	def.	(Germany) Christopher Henze	TKO (Punches)	1	1:10	

== KSW 43: Soldić vs. Du Plessis ==
KSW 43: Soldić vs. Du Plessis
- Promotion: Konfrontacja Sztuk Walki
- Date: April 14, 2018
- Venue: Centennial Hall
- City: Wrocław, Poland

Event chronology
KSW 42	KSW 43: Soldić vs. Du Plessis	KSW 44

'KSW 43: Soldić vs. Du Plessis' was a mixed martial arts event held by Konfrontacja Sztuk Walki on April 14, 2018, at the Centennial Hall in Wrocław, Poland.

=== Background ===
Bonus awards

The following fighters will be awarded bonuses:

- Fight of the Night: David Zawada vs. Michał Michalski
- Knockout of the Night: Dricus du Plessis & Damian Janikowski
- Submission of the Night: David Zawada

=== Results ===
KSW 43
Weight Class				Method	Round	Time	Notes
Welterweight 77 kg	(South Africa) Dricus du Plessis	def.	(Croatia) Roberto Soldić (c)	KO (Punches)	2	1:38	For the KSW Welterweight Championship
Middleweight 84 kg	(Poland) Damian Janikowski	def.	(Democratic Republic of the Congo) Yannick Bahati	TKO (Punches)	1	0:18	
Heavyweight 120 kg	(England) Phil De Fries	def.	(Poland) Michał Andryszak	TKO (Punches)	1	3:32	For the Vacant KSW Heavyweight Championship
Featherweight 66 kg	(France) Salahdine Parnasse	def.	(Poland) Artur Sowiński	Decision (Unanimous)	3	5:00	
Welterweight 77 kg	(Germany) David Zawada	def.	(Poland) Michał Michalski	Submission (Rear-Naked Choke)	3	0:48	
Lightweight 70 kg	(Northern Ireland) Norman Parke	def.	(Poland) Lukasz Chlewicki	Decision (Unanimous)	3	5:00	
Bantamweight 61 kg	(Croatia) Antun Račić	def.	(Poland) Kamil Selwa	Decision (Unanimous)	3	5:00	
Lightweight 70 kg	(Poland) Maciej Kazieczko	def.	(Poland) Maciej Kaliciński	Decision (Unanimous)	3	5:00	

== KSW 44: The Game ==
KSW 44: The Game
- Promotion: Konfrontacja Sztuk Walki
- Date: June 9, 2018
- Venue: Ergo Arena
- City: Gdańsk, Poland

Event chronology
KSW 43	KSW 44: The Game	KSW 45

'KSW 44: The Game' was a mixed martial arts event held by Konfrontacja Sztuk Walki on June 9, 2018, at the Ergo Arena in Gdańsk, Poland.

=== Background ===
The original co-main event featured the rematch between Marcin Wrzosek and Kleber Koike Erbst for the vacant featherweight title. However Wrzosek suffered a pectoral muscle tear and was forced out of the rematch. As a result, Marian Ziolkowski stepped in against Erbst in a catchweight fight.

Bonus awards

The following fighters were awarded bonuses:

- Fight of the Night: Daniel Torres vs. Filip Wolański
- Knockout of the Night: Erko Jun
- Submission of the Night: Kleber Koike Erbst

=== Results ===
KSW 44
Weight Class				Method	Round	Time	Notes
Heavyweight 120 kg	(Poland) Karol Bedorf	def.	(Poland) Mariusz Pudzianowski	Submission (Kimura)	1	1:51	
Middleweight 84 kg	(Poland) Michał Materla	def.	(Germany) Martin Zawada	TKO (Punches)	2	2:58	
Heavyweight 120 kg	(Bosnia and Herzegovina) Erko Jun	def.	(Poland) Tomasz Oświeciński	KO (Punch)	1	2:21	
Featherweight 68 kg	(Japan) Kleber Koike Erbst	def.	(Poland) Marian Ziółkowski	Submission (Armbar)	1	3:44	
Featherweight 66 kg	(Brazil) Daniel Torres	def.	(Poland) Filip Wolański	Decision (Split)	3	5:00	
Lightweight 70 kg	(Poland) Gracjan Szadziński	def.	(Republic of Ireland) Paul Redmond	KO (Punches)	2	1:36	
Light Heavyweight 93 kg	(Brazil) Wagner Prado	def.	(Republic of Ireland) Chris Field	TKO (Punches)	2	2:17	
Featherweight 66 kg	(Poland) Łukasz Rajewski	def.	(Croatia) Leo Zulić	Submission (Ankle Lock)	1	1:48	
Bantamweight 61 kg	(Poland) Sebastian Przybysz	def.	(Poland) Dawid Gralka	KO (Punches)	1	1:48	

== KSW 45: The Return to Wembley ==
KSW 45: The Return to Wembley
- Promotion: Konfrontacja Sztuk Walki
- Date: October 6, 2018
- Venue: Wembley Arena
- City: London, England

Event chronology
KSW 44	KSW 45: The Return to Wembley	KSW 46

'KSW 45: The Return to Wembley' was a mixed martial arts event held by Konfrontacja Sztuk Walki on October 6, 2018, at the Wembley Arena in London, England.

=== Background ===
Michał Andryszak got injured, Thiago Silva steps in on short notice to replace Andryszak against James McSweeney.

John Smith withdrew from his bout with Akop Szostak. Akop Szostak (3-2) will now face Jamie Sloane, who step in on less than two weeks’ notice.

Max Nunes no-showed KSW's fight week obligations, Lukasz Parobiec steps up on two days' notice to face Wagner Prado.

Akop Szostak vs. Jamie Sloane ruled a no-contest following an accidental eye poke in the first round.

Bonus awards

The following fighters will be awarded bonuses:

- Fight of the Night: Roberto Soldić vs. Dricus du Plessis
- Knockout of the Night: Wagner Prado and Scott Askham
- Submission of the Night: Phil De Fries

=== Results ===
KSW 45
Weight Class				Method	Round	Time	Notes
Heavyweight 120 kg	(England) Phil De Fries (c)	def.	(Poland) Karol Bedorf	Submission (Americana)	2	4:26	For the KSW Heavyweight Championship
Heavyweight 120 kg	(Bosnia and Herzegovina) Erko Jun	def.	(Poland) Paweł "Popek" Rak	TKO (punches)	2	2:08	
Middleweight 84 kg	(Poland) Michał Materla	def.	(Poland) Damian Janikowski	TKO (punches)	1	3:10	Tournament Semi-Finals
Welterweight 77 kg	(Croatia) Roberto Soldić	def.	(South Africa) Dricus du Plessis (c)	TKO (punches)	3	2:33	For the KSW Welterweight Championship
Middleweight 84 kg	(England) Scott Askham	def.	(Poland) Marcin Wójcik	KO (Kick to the Body and Punches)	1	1:37	Tournament Semi-Finals
Heavyweight 120 kg	(Brazil) Thiago Silva	def.	(England) James McSweeney	Decision (Unanimous)	3	5:00	
Light Heavyweight 93 kg	(Brazil) Wagner Prado	def.	(Poland) Łukasz Parobiec	KO (Punch)	1	0:40	
Light Heavyweight 93 kg	(England) Jamie Sloane		(Poland) Akop Szostak	No Contest (Eye Poke)	1		
Lightweight 70 kg	(Poland) Leszek Krakowski	def.	(England) Alfie Davis	Decision (Split)	3	5:00	

== KSW 46: Narkun vs. Khalidov 2 ==
KSW 46: Narkun vs. Khalidov 2
- Promotion: Konfrontacja Sztuk Walki
- Date: December 1, 2018
- Venue: Gliwice Arena
- City: Gliwice, Poland

Event chronology
KSW 45	KSW 46: Narkun vs. Khalidov 2	KSW 47

'KSW 46: Narkun vs. Khalidov 2' was a mixed martial arts event held by Konfrontacja Sztuk Walki on December 1, 2018, at the Gliwice Arena in Gliwice, Poland.

=== Background ===
Borys Mańkowski suffered an injury during training and was forced to withdraw from his fight against Bruce Souto. The bout was canceled.

Also a severe hand injury forced Gracjan Szadziński to withdraw from his showdown with Marian Ziółkowski, Grzegorz Szulakowski stepped in on a short notice to face Ziółkowski.

Bonus awards

The following fighters will be awarded bonuses:

- Fight of the Night: Tomasz Narkun vs. Mamed Khalidov and Romaz Szymanski vs. Daniel Torres
- Knockout of the Night: Roberto Soldić and Krystian Kaszubowski

=== Results ===
KSW 46
Weight Class				Method	Round	Time	Notes
Catchweight 92 kg	(Poland) Tomasz Narkun	def.	(Poland) Mamed Khalidov	Decision (Unanimous)	3	5:00	
Featherweight 66 kg	(Poland) Mateusz Gamrot	def.	(Japan) Kleber Koike Erbst	Decision (Unanimous)	5	5:00	For the Vacant KSW Featherweight Championship
Featherweight 66 kg	(France) Salahdine Parnasse	def.	(Poland) Marcin Wrzosek	Decision (Unanimous)	3	5:00	
Catchweight 80 kg	(Croatia) Roberto Soldić	def.	(Brazil) Vinicius Bohrer	KO (Punch)	1	4:34	
Featherweight 66 kg	(Poland) Roman Szymański	def.	(Brazil) Daniel Torres	Decision (Unanimous)	3	5:00	
Lightweight 70 kg	(Poland) Marian Ziółkowski	def.	(Poland) Grzegorz Szulakowski	Decision (Unanimous)	3	5:00	
Lightweight 70 kg	(Poland) Artur Sowiński	def.	(Poland) Kamil Szymuszowski	Decision (Unanimous)	3	5:00	
Bantamweight 61 kg	(Croatia) Antun Račić	def.	(Poland) Sebastian Przybysz	Decision (Unanimous)	3	5:00	
Welterweight 77 kg	(Poland) Krystian Kaszubowski	def.	(Poland) Michal Michalski	KO (Punches)	1	2:14	
