= 2014 in Konfrontacja Sztuk Walki =

Mixed martial arts events

Information
- First date: March 22, 2014
- Last date: December 6, 2014

Events
- Total events: 4

Fights
- Title fights: 5

Chronology
2013 in KSW	2014 in Konfrontacja Sztuk Walki	2015 in KSW

The year 2014 was the eleventh year in the history of the Konfrontacja Sztuk Walki, a mixed martial arts promotion based in Poland. In 2014 Konfrontacja Sztuk Walki held 4 events beginning with, KSW 26: Materla vs. Silva III.

== List of events ==
#	Event Title	Date	Arena	Location
1	KSW 26: Materla vs. Silva 3	March 22, 2014	Hala Torwar	Warsaw, Poland
2	KSW 27: Cage Time	May 17, 2014	Ergo Arena	Gdańsk, Poland
3	KSW 28: Fighters Den	October 4, 2014	Azoty Arena	Szczecin, Poland
4	KSW 29: Reload	December 6, 2014	Tauron Arena	Kraków, Poland

== Title fights ==
Title fights in 2014
#	Weight Class				Method	Round	Time	Event	Notes
1	Middleweight 84 kg	(Poland) Michał Materla (c)	def.	(Angola) Jay Silva	Decision (Unanimous)	3	5:00	KSW 26	For the KSW Middleweight Championship
2	Female Strawweight 52 kg	(Poland) Karolina Kowalkiewicz (c)	def.	(Austria) Jasminka Cive	Submission (Armbar)	1	3:53	KSW 27	For the KSW Women's Strawweight Championship
3	Welterweight 77 kg	(Poland) Borys Mankowski	def.	(Poland) Aslambek Saidov (c)	Submission (Triangle Choke)	2	4:27	KSW 27	For the KSW Welterweight Championship
4	Heavyweight 120 kg	(Poland) Karol Bedorf (c)	def.	(Brazil) Rolles Gracie	TKO (Kick To The Body And Punches)	1	4:04	KSW 28	For the KSW Heavyweight Championship
5	Welterweight 77 kg	(Poland) Borys Mańkowski (c)	def.	(Germany) David Zawada	Submission (Arm-Triangle Choke)	1	0:43	KSW 29	For the KSW Welterweight Championship

== KSW 26: Materla vs. Silva 3 ==
KSW 26: Materla vs. Silva 3
- Promotion: Konfrontacja Sztuk Walki
- Date: March 22, 2014
- Venue: Torwar Hall
- City: Warsaw, Poland
- Attendance: 4,795

Event chronology
KSW 25	KSW 26: Materla vs. Silva 3	KSW 27

KSW 26 was a mixed martial arts event held on March 22, 2014 at the Torwar Hall in Warsaw, Poland.

=== Results ===
Fight Card
Weight Class				Method	Round	Time	Notes
Middleweight 84 kg	(Poland) Michał Materla (c)	def.	(Angola) Jay Silva	Decision (Unanimous)	3	5:00	For the KSW Middleweight Championship.
Heavyweight 120 kg	(Poland) Marcin Rozalski	def.	(United States) Nick Rossborough	TKO (Punches)	2	4:36	
Featherweight 66 kg	(Poland) Artur Sowiński	def.	(Poland) Anzor Azhiev	DQ (Illegal Knee)	1	3:07	
Light Heavyweight 93 kg	(Croatia) Goran Reljic	def.	(Poland) Karol Celinski	Decision (Unanimous)	3	5:00	
Female Flyweight 57 kg	(Poland) Kamila Porczyk	def.	(Ukraine) Iryna Shaparenko	Decision (Unanimous)	3	5:00	
Heavyweight 120 kg	(Poland) Michał Andryszak	def.	(Poland) Paul Slowinski	TKO (Punches)	1	1:06	
Lightweight 70 kg	(Lithuania) Sergej Grecicho	def.	(Poland) Jacub Kowalewicz	Decision (Unanimous)	3	5:00	
Featherweight 66 kg	(Poland) Arbi Shamaev	def.	(Angola) Helson Henriques	Decision (Unanimous)	3	5:00	

== KSW 27: Cage Time ==
KSW 27: Cage Time
- Promotion: Konfrontacja Sztuk Walki
- Date: May 17, 2014
- Venue: Ergo Arena
- City: Gdańsk, Poland
- Attendance: 12,223

Event chronology
KSW 26	KSW 27: Cage Time	KSW 28

KSW 27: Cage Time was a mixed martial arts event held on May 17, 2014 at the Ergo Arena in Gdańsk, Poland .

=== Background ===
It was the first event promoted by KSW where the traditional white ring was replaced by a circular cage which became the new standard for future Polish MMA events.

=== Results ===
Fight Card
Weight Class				Method	Round	Time	Notes
Middleweight 84 kg	(Poland) Mamed Khalidov	def.	(Brazil) Maiquel Falcao	Submission (Armbar)	1	4:53	
Heavyweight 120 kg	(Poland) Mariusz Pudzianowski	def.	(England) Oli Thompson	Decision (Unanimous)	2	5:00	
Welterweight 77 kg	(Poland) Borys Mankowski	def.	(Poland) Aslambek Saidov (c)	Submission (Triangle Choke)	2	4:27	For the KSW Welterweight Championship.
Female Strawweight 52 kg	(Poland) Karolina Kowalkiewicz (c)	def.	(Austria) Jasminka Cive	Submission (Armbar)	1	3:53	For the KSW Women's Strawweight Championship.
Middleweight 84 kg	(Poland) Piotr Strus	vs.	(Germany) Abu Azaitar	Draw	3	5:00	
Lightweight 70 kg	(Poland) Mateusz Gamrot	def.	(England) Jefferson George	Decision (Unanimous)	3	5:00	
Middleweight 84 kg	(Poland) Tomasz Narkun	def.	(Brazil) Charles Andrade	Submission (Kneebar)	1	1:02	
Welterweight 77 kg	(Poland) Rafal Blachuta	def.	(France) Patrick Vallee	Submission (Scarf Hold Armlock)	2	3:15	
Lightweight 70 kg	(Poland) Lukasz Chlewicki	def.	(Poland) Lukasz Rajewski	Decision (Unanimous)	3	5:00	

== KSW 28: Fighters Den ==
KSW 28: Fighters Den
- Promotion: Konfrontacja Sztuk Walki
- Date: October 4, 2014
- Venue: Hala Widowiskowo-Sportowa
- City: Szczecin, Poland
- Attendance: 5,017

Event chronology
KSW 27	KSW 28: Fighters Den	KSW 29

KSW 28: Fighters Den was a mixed martial arts event held on October 4, 2014 at the Hala Widowiskowo-Sportowa in Szczecin, Poland.

=== Results ===
Fight Card
Weight Class				Method	Round	Time	Notes
Heavyweight 120 kg	(Poland) Karol Bedorf (c)	def.	(Brazil) Rolles Gracie	TKO (Kick To The Body And Punches)	1	4:04	For the KSW Heavyweight Championship.
Middleweight 84 kg	(Poland) Michał Materla (c)	def.	(Brazil) Jorge Luis Bezerra	TKO (Punches)	2	1:46	Non-Title Fight
Heavyweight 120 kg	(Australia) Peter Graham	def.	(Poland) Marcin Różalski	TKO (Knee Injury)	2	0:43	
Lightweight 70 kg	(Poland) Maciej Jewtuszko (c)	def.	(Montenegro) Vaso Bakočević	KO (Knee To The Body)	3	3:00	Non-Title Fight
Welterweight 77 kg	(Poland) Rafał Moks	def.	(Brazil) Daniel Acacio	Submission (Guillotine Choke)	1	4:42	
Featherweight 66 kg	(Poland) Anzor Azhiev	def.	(Angola) Helson Henriquez	Decision (Unanimous)	3	5:00	
Lightweight 70 kg	(Poland) Marcin Parcheta	def.	(Poland) Rafał Jackiewicz	TKO (Leg Kicks)	3	3:53	
Heavyweight 120 kg	(Poland) Michal Włodarek	def.	(Poland) Michał Andryszak	TKO (Punches)	1	0:27	
Heavyweight 120 kg	(Poland) Szymon Bajor	def.	(Poland) Kamil Waluś	TKO (Punches)	1	1:42	
Lightweight 70 kg	(Poland) Jakub Kowalewicz	def.	(Poland) Kamil Gniadek	Decision (Unanimous)	3	5:00	

== KSW 29: Reload ==
KSW 29: Reload
- Promotion: Konfrontacja Sztuk Walki
- Date: December 6, 2014
- Venue: Kraków Arena
- City: Kraków, Poland
- Attendance: 14,000

Event chronology
KSW 28	KSW 29: Reload	KSW 30

KSW 29: Reload was a mixed martial arts event held on December 6, 2014 at the Kraków Arena in Kraków, Poland.

=== Results ===
Fight Card
Weight Class				Method	Round	Time	Notes
Middleweight 84 kg	(Poland) Mamed Khalidov	def.	(United States) Brett Cooper	Decision (Unanimous)	3	5:00	
Heavyweight 120 kg	(Poland) Mariusz Pudzianowski	def.	(Poland) Paweł Nastula	Decision (Unanimous)	3	5:00	
Welterweight 77 kg	(Poland) Borys Mańkowski (c)	def.	(Germany) David Zawada	Submission (Arm-Triangle Choke)	1	0:43	For the KSW Welterweight Championship.
Middleweight 84 kg	(Poland) Piotr Strus	vs.	(Angola) Jay Silva	Draw (Majority)	3	5:00	
Light Heavyweight 93 kg	(Croatia) Goran Reljic	def.	(Poland) Tomasz Narkun	Decision (Majority)	3	5:00	
Featherweight 66 kg	(Poland) Artur Sowiński	def.	(Montenegro) Vaso Bakočević	Decision (Split)	3	5:00	
Lightweight 70 kg	(Poland) Mateusz Gamrot	def.	(Poland) Łukasz Chlewicki	Decision (Unanimous)	3	5:00	
Light Heavyweight 93 kg	(Poland) Karol Celiński	def.	(Poland) Tomasz Kondraciuk	TKO (Corner Stoppage)	3	3:34	
Welterweight 84 kg	(Poland) Robert Radomski	def.	(Poland) Mateusz Piskosz	Decision (Unanimous)	3	5:00	
