= Marcin Wójcik =

Polish mixed martial artist (born 1989)

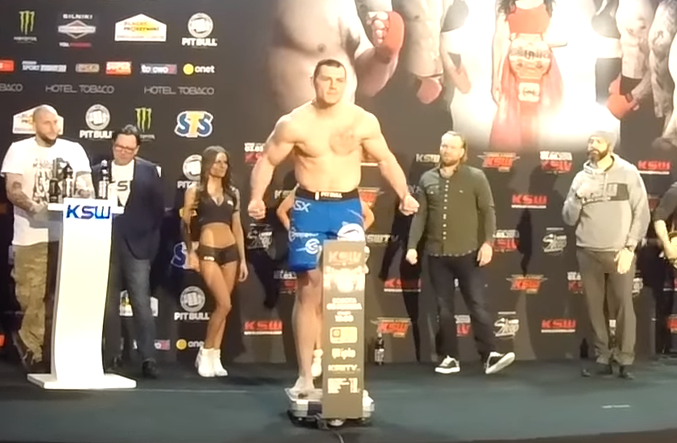
- Wójcik at KSW 42
- Born: Marcin Wójcik; September 2, 1989 (age 37); Piła, Poland
- Other names: The Giant
- Height: 6 ft 1 in (1.85 m)
- Weight: 232 lb (105 kg; 16 st 8 lb)
- Division: Middleweight (2018); Light Heavyweight (2007–2017, 2019–2025); Heavyweight (2018, 2025–present)
- Reach: 73.2 in (186 cm)
- Fighting out of: Piła, Poland
- Team: GŁD Team; Ankos MMA Poznań
- Years active: 2007–present

Mixed martial arts record
- Total: 34
- Wins: 22
- By knockout: 11
- By submission: 8
- By decision: 3
- Losses: 12
- By knockout: 6
- By submission: 5
- By decision: 1

Other information
- Mixed martial arts record from Sherdog

Marcin Wójcik (born September 2, 1989) is a Polish professional mixed martial artist. He currently competes in the Heavyweight division of Konfrontacja Sztuk Walki (KSW). He is a former FEN Light Heavyweight Champion. He has previously competed on Cage Warriors and Professional Fighters League (PFL).

== Professional career ==
=== Early career ===
Wójcik made his professional debut on December 14, 2007, against Grzegorz Szatkowski. Wójcik won the fight via a first-round submission.

=== Konfrontacja Sztuk Walki debut ===
Wójcik made his debut under Konfrontacja Sztuk Walki on March 29, 2008, against Tomasz Niedźwiecki. Wójcik lost the fight via a first-round TKO.

=== Profesjonalna Liga MMA ===
After accumulating a record of 1–3, Wójcik made his debut under Profesjonalna Liga MMA on May 11, 2013, against Artur Mroczek. Wójcik won the fight via a third-round TKO.

His next fight came on October 19, 2013, against Michał Gutowski. Wójcik lost the fight via a Split Decision.

His next fight came on April 12, 2014, against Wojciech Balejko. Wójcik won the fight via a first-round submission.

His next fight came on October 24, 2014 against Bartłomiej Wydra. Wójcik won the fight via a first-round submission.

His final fight with the federation came on November 21, 2014, against future UFC fighter, Michał Oleksiejczuk. Wójcik won the fight via a first-round TKO.

=== Fight Exclusive Night ===
Wójcik made his debut under Fight Exclusive Night on July 31, 2015, against Krzysztof Pietraszek. Wójcik won the fight via a first-round submission.

His next fight came on November 7, 2015, against Wojciech Janusz. Wójcik won the fight via a Unanimous Decision.

=== First return to Konfrontacja Sztuk Walki ===
Wójcik returned to Konfrontacja Sztuk Walki 8 years after last competing under them. He returned on March 5, 2016, against Tomasz Kondraciuk. Wójcik won the fight via a second-round TKO.

His next fight came on May 27, 2016, against Michał Fijałka. Wójcik won the fight via a Unanimous Decision.

His next fight came on December 3, 2016, against Marcin Łazarz. Wójcik won the fight via a first-round submission. This earned him his first Submission of the Night bonus.

In his next fight, Wójcik faced Tomasz Narkun for Narkun's KSW Light Heavyweight Championship on May 27, 2017. Wójcik lost the fight via a first-round submission.

His next fight came on March 3, 2018, against Hatef Moeil. Wójcik won the fight via a second-round retirement.

His next fight came on October 6, 2018, in his Middleweight debut against Scott Askham in the semifinals of the KSW Middleweight Tournament. Wójcik lost the fight via a first-round knockout.

=== Cage Warriors ===
Wójcik made his debut under Cage Warriors on March 2, 2019, against future UFC fighter, Modestas Bukauskas. Wójcik lost the fight via a second-round TKO.

=== Gladiators Arena ===
In his debut under Gladiators Arena, Wójcik faced Michał Gutowski on October 26, 2019, for the vacant Gladiators Arena Light Heavyweight championship. Wójcik won the fight via a first-round TKO, thus winning his first career championship.

=== First return to Fight Exlucisve Night ===
Wójcik returned to Fight Exclusive Night on June 13, 2020, against Rafał Kijańczuk. Wójcik won the fight via a second-round TKO.

=== FEN Light Heavyweight Champion ===
Wójcik faced Adam Kowalski for the vacant FEN Light Heavyweight Championship on November 28, 2020. Wójcik won the fight via a fourth-round TKO, winning his second career championship in the process.

In his first title defense, he faced Eder de Souza on October 16, 2021. Wójcik lost the fight via a second-round submission, losing his championship in the process.

His next fight came on March 12, 2022, against Paweł Hadaś. Wójcik won the fight via a second-round TKO.

=== Professional Fighters League ===
Wójcik made his debut under Professional Fighters League (PFL) on August 13, 2022. Initially, he was scheduled to face Mohammad Fakhreddine. Fakhreddine later withdrew from the fight, and was replaced by Mick Stanton. Wójcik won the fight via a first-round submission.

=== Second return to Fight Exclusive Night ===
Wójcik returned to Fight Exclusive Night on May 27, 2023, against Ednaldo Oliveira. Wójcik won the fight via a second-round TKO.

His last fight with the federation came on August 18, 2023, against Adam Wieczorek. Wójcik won the fight via a second-round TKO.

=== Second return to Konfrontacja Sztuk Walki ===
Wójcik returned to Konfrontacja Sztuk Walki on November 11, 2023, 5 years after last competing under them. In his return, he faced Henrique da Silva. Wójcik won the fight via a second-round knockout. This earned him his first Knockout of the Night bonus.

His next fight came on February 24, 2024 against Rafał Haratyk in the first round of the 2024 KSW Light Heavyweight Tournament. Wójcik lost the fight via a first-round TKO.

His next fight came on September 14, 2024, against Damian Piwowarczyk. Wójcik won the fight via a first-round submission.

Wójcik faced Rafał Haratyk in a rematch for Haratyk's KSW Light Heavyweight Championship on November 16, 2024. Wójcik lost the fight via a second-round knockout.

His next fight came on July 19, 2025, against Ibragim Chuzhigaev. Wójcik won the fight via a second-round TKO.

His next fight came on December 20, 2025, against Augusto Sakai in his return to the Heavyweight division. Wójcik won the fight via a Unanimous Decision.

== Championships and accomplishments ==
=== Mixed martial arts ===
- Konfrontacja Sztuk Walki
  - Submission of the Night (One time)
  - Knockout of the Night (One time)
- Fight Exclusive Night
  - FEN Light Heavyweight Championship (One time; former)
- Gladiators Arena
  - Gladiators Arena Light Heavyweight Championship (One time; former)

== Mixed martial arts record ==
Professional record breakdown
| 34 matches | 22 wins | 12 losses |
| By knockout | 11 | 6 |
| By submission | 8 | 5 |
| By decision | 3 | 1 |

| Res. | Record | Opponent | Method | Event | Date | Round | Time | Location | Notes |
|---|---|---|---|---|---|---|---|---|---|
| Loss | 22–12 | Štefan Vojčák | TKO (head kick and punches) | KSW 121 | September 19, 2026 | 4 | 2:36 | Liberec, Czech Republic | For the interim KSW Heavyweight Championship. |
| Loss | 22–11 | Phil De Fries | Submission (rear-naked choke) | KSW 117 | April 18, 2026 | 1 | 4:08 | Warsaw, Poland | For the KSW Heavyweight Championship. |
| Win | 22–10 | Augusto Sakai | Decision (unanimous) | KSW 113 | December 20, 2025 | 3 | 5:00 | Łódź, Poland | Return to Heavyweight. |
| Win | 21–10 | Ibragim Chuzhigaev | TKO (punches) | KSW 108 | July 19, 2025 | 2 | 4:20 | Olsztyn, Poland | |
| Loss | 20–10 | Rafał Haratyk | KO (punch) | KSW 100 | November 16, 2024 | 2 | 3:22 | Gliwice, Poland | For the KSW Light Heavyweight Championship. |
| Win | 20–9 | Damian Piwowarczyk | Submission (rear-naked choke) | KSW 98 | September 14, 2024 | 1 | 2:46 | Lubin, Poland | |
| Loss | 19–9 | Rafał Haratyk | TKO (punches) | KSW Epic: Khalidov vs. Adamek | February 24, 2024 | 1 | 4:05 | Gliwice, Poland | 2024 KSW Light Heavyweight Tournament Semifinal. |
| Win | 19–8 | Henrique da Silva | KO (punch) | KSW 88 | November 11, 2023 | 2 | 0:33 | Radom, Poland | Knockout of the Night. |
| Win | 18–8 | Adam Wieczorek | TKO (punches) | Fight Exclusive Night 48 | August 18, 2023 | 2 | 0:22 | Jastrzębie-Zdrój, Poland | |
| Win | 17–8 | Ednaldo Oliveira | TKO (punches) | Fight Exclusive Night 46 | May 27, 2023 | 2 | 4:52 | Piła, Poland | Catchweight (216 lb) bout. |
| Win | 16–8 | Mick Stanton | Submission (rear-naked choke) | PFL 8 (2022) | August 13, 2022 | 1 | 4:04 | Cardiff, Wales | |
| Win | 15–8 | Paweł Hadaś | TKO (punches) | Fight Exclusive Night 39 | March 12, 2022 | 2 | 3:08 | Ząbki, Poland | |
| Loss | 14–8 | Eder de Souza | Technical submission (brabo choke) | Fight Exclusive Night 36 | October 16, 2021 | 2 | 2:20 | Szczecin, Poland | Lost the FEN Light Heavyweight Championship. |
| Win | 14–7 | Adam Kowalski | TKO (punches) | Fight Exclusive Night 31 | November 28, 2020 | 4 | 2:30 | Łódź, Poland | Won the vacant FEN Light Heavyweight Championship. |
| Win | 13–7 | Rafał Kijańczuk | TKO (punches) | Fight Exclusive Night 28 | June 13, 2020 | 2 | 3:10 | Lublin, Poland | |
| Win | 12–7 | Michał Gutowski | TKO (punches) | Gladiators Arena 13 | October 26, 2019 | 1 | 2:20 | Pyrzyce, Poland | Won the vacant Gladiators Arena Light Heavyweight Championship. |
| Loss | 11–7 | Modestas Bukauskas | TKO (punches) | Cage Warriors 102 | March 2, 2019 | 2 | 4:09 | London, England | Return to Light Heavyweight. |
| Loss | 11–6 | Scott Askham | KO (body kick and punches) | KSW 45 | October 6, 2018 | 1 | 1:37 | London, England | Middleweight debut; KSW Middleweight Tournament Semifinal |
| Win | 11–5 | Hatef Moeil | TKO (retirement) | KSW 42 | March 3, 2018 | 2 | 5:00 | Łódź, Poland | Heavyweight debut. |
| Loss | 10–5 | Tomasz Narkun | Submission (triangle choke) | KSW 39 | May 27, 2017 | 1 | 4:59 | Warsaw, Poland | For the KSW Light Heavyweight Championship. |
| Win | 10–4 | Marcin Łazarz | Submission (rear-naked choke) | KSW 37 | December 3, 2016 | 1 | 3:43 | Kraków, Poland | Submission of the Night. |
| Win | 9–4 | Michał Fijałka | Decision (unanimous) | KSW 35 | May 27, 2016 | 3 | 5:00 | Gdańsk, Poland | |
| Win | 8–4 | Tomasz Kondraciuk | TKO (punches) | KSW 34 | March 5, 2016 | 2 | 1:31 | Warsaw, Poland | |
| Win | 7–4 | Wojciech Janusz | Decision (unanimous) | Fight Exclusive Night 9 | November 7, 2015 | 3 | 5:00 | Wrocław, Poland | |
| Win | 6–4 | Krzysztof Pietraszek | Submission (arm triangle choke) | Fight Exclusive Night 8 | July 31, 2015 | 1 | 3:05 | Kołobrzeg, Poland | |
| Win | 5–4 | Michał Oleksiejczuk | TKO (punches) | PLMMA 44 | November 21, 2014 | 1 | 2:12 | Bieżuń, Poland | |
| Win | 4–4 | Bartłomiej Wydra | Submission (armbar) | PLMMA 41 | October 24, 2014 | 1 | 3:47 | Legionowo, Poland | |
| Win | 3–4 | Wojciech Balejko | Submission (arm triangle choke) | PLMMA 31 | April 12, 2014 | 1 | 2:40 | Koszalin, Poland | |
| Loss | 2–4 | Michał Gutowski | Decision (split) | PLMMA 23 | October 19, 2013 | 3 | 5:00 | Białystok, Poland | |
| Win | 2–3 | Artur Mroczek | TKO (punches) | PLMMA 16 | May 11, 2013 | 3 | 2:03 | Koszalin, Poland | |
| Loss | 1–3 | Michał Włodarek | Submission (arm triangle choke) | Ring XF 1 | March 13, 2010 | 2 | 1:25 | Zgierz, Poland | Light Heavyweight tournament Semifnal. |
| Loss | 1–2 | Marek Kowalczyk | Submission (rear-naked choke) | Warriors Extreme Fighting | June 27, 2008 | 1 | 1:33 | Wrocław, Poland | |
| Loss | 1–1 | Tomasz Niedźwiecki | TKO (punches) | KSW Elimination 2 | March 29, 2008 | 1 | 1:07 | Wrocław, Poland | KSW Elimination 2 Tournament Quarterfinal. |
| Win | 1–0 | Grzegorz Szatkowski | Submission (arm triangle choke) | Bushido v5 | December 14, 2007 | 1 | N/A | Piła, Poland | Light Heavyweight debut. |

== See also ==
- List of current Konfrontacja Sztuk Walki fighters
- List of male mixed martial artists
