= 2015 in Konfrontacja Sztuk Walki =

Mixed martial arts events

Information
- First date: February 21, 2015
- Last date: November 28, 2015

Events
- Total events: 4

Fights
- Title fights: 8

Chronology
2014 in KSW	2015 in Konfrontacja Sztuk Walki	2016 in KSW

The year 2015 was the twelfth year in the history of the Konfrontacja Sztuk Walki, a mixed martial arts promotion based in Poland. In 2015 Konfrontacja Sztuk Walki held 4 events beginning with, KSW 30.

== List of events ==
#	Event title	Date	Arena	Location
1	KSW 30: Genesis	February 21, 2015	HWS Arena	Poznań, Poland
2	KSW 31: Materla vs. Drwal	May 23, 2015	Ergo Arena	Gdańsk, Poland
3	KSW 32: Road to Wembley	October 31, 2015	Wembley Arena	London, England
4	KSW 33: Materla vs. Khalidov	November 28, 2015	Tauron Arena	Kraków, Poland

== Title fights ==
Title fights in 2015
#	Weight Class				Method	Round	Time	Event	Notes
1	Welterweight 77 kg	(Poland) Borys Mańkowski (c)	def.	(Norway) Mohsen Bahari	Decision (Unanimous)	3	5:00	KSW 30	For the KSW Welterweight Championship
2	Light Heavyweight 93 kg	(Croatia) Goran Reljić	def.	(Slovakia) Attila Vegh	Decision (Split)	3	5:00	KSW 31	For the Vacant KSW Light Heavyweight Championship
3	Middleweight 84 kg	(Poland) Michał Materla (c)	def.	(Poland) Tomasz Drwal	TKO (Punches)	3	4:56	KSW 31	For the KSW Middleweight Championship.
4	Light Heavyweight 93 kg	(Poland) Tomasz Narkun	def.	(Croatia) Goran Reljic (c)	TKO (Punches)	1	1:55	KSW 32	For the KSW Light Heavyweight Championship
5	Welterweight 77 kg	(Poland) Borys Mańkowski (c)	def.	(United States) Jesse Taylor	Submission (Guillotine Choke)	1	3:02	KSW 32	For the KSW Welterweight Championship
6	Featherweight 66 kg	(Poland) Artur Sowiński	def.	(Japan) Kleber Koike Erbst	Decision (Unanimous)	3	5:00	KSW 33	For the Inaugural KSW Featherweight Championship
7	Heavyweight 120 kg	(Poland) Karol Bedorf (c)	def.	(Poland) Michal Kita	TKO (Head Kick)	2	2:46	KSW 33	For the KSW Heavyweight Championship
8	Middleweight 84 kg	(Poland) Mamed Khalidov	def.	(Poland) Michał Materla (c)	TKO (Flying Knee and Punches)	1	0:31	KSW 33	For the KSW Middleweight Championship

== KSW 30: Genesis ==
KSW 30: Genesis
- Promotion: Konfrontacja Sztuk Walki
- Date: February 21, 2015
- Venue: Poznań Arena
- City: Poznań, Poland
- Attendance: 5,000

Event chronology
KSW 29	KSW 30: Genesis	KSW 31

KSW 30 was a mixed martial arts event held on February 21, 2015, at the Poznań Arena in Poznań, Poland.

=== Results ===
Fight Card
Weight Class				Method	Round	Time	Notes
Welterweight 77 kg	(Poland) Borys Mańkowski (c)	def.	(Norway) Mohsen Bahari	Decision (Unanimous)	3	5:00	For the KSW Welterweight Championship.
Welterweight 77 kg	(Russia) Aslambek Saidow	def.	(Poland) Rafał Moks	Decision (Unanimous)	3	5:00	
Female Strawweight 52 kg	(Poland) Karolina Kowalkiewicz (c)	def.	(Brazil) Kalindra Faria	Decision (Split)	3	5:00	Non-Title Fight
Lightweight 70 kg	(Poland) Mateusz Gamrot	def.	(Brazil) Rodrigo Cavalheiro	TKO (Punches)	3	4:54	
Featherweight 66 kg	(Japan) Kleber Koike Erbst	def.	(Russia) Anzor Azhiev	Submission (Triangle Choke)	1	3:16	
Heavyweight 120 kg	(Poland) Michał Włodarek	def.	(Poland) Szymon Bajor	Decision (Unanimous)	3	5:00	
Lightweight 70 kg	(Poland) Jakub Kowalewicz	def.	(Poland) Łukasz Rajewski	Submission (Rear-Naked Choke)	1	3:05	
Lightweight 70 kg	(Poland) Kamil Gniadek	vs.	(Poland) Mateusz Zawadzki	Draw (Split)	3	5:00	

== KSW 31: Materla vs. Drwal ==
KSW 31: Materla vs. Drwal
- Promotion: Konfrontacja Sztuk Walki
- Date: May 23, 2015
- Venue: Ergo Arena
- City: Gdańsk, Poland
- Attendance: 8,830

Event chronology
KSW 30	KSW 31: Materla vs. Drwal	KSW 32

KSW 31 was a mixed martial arts event held on 23, 2015 at the Ergo Arena in Gdańsk, Poland.

=== Results ===
Fight Card
Weight Class				Method	Round	Time	Notes
Middleweight 84 kg	(Poland) Michał Materla (c)	def.	(Poland) Tomasz Drwal	TKO (Punches)	3	4:56	For the KSW Middleweight Championship.
Heavyweight 120 kg	(Poland) Mariusz Pudzianowski	def.	(Brazil) Rolles Gracie Jr.	KO (Punch)	1	0:28	
Heavyweight 120 kg	(Poland) Karol Bedorf (c)	def.	(Australia) Peter Graham	Decision (Unanimous)	3	5:00	Non-Title Fight
Light Heavyweight 93 kg	(Croatia) Goran Reljić	def.	(Slovakia) Attila Vegh	Decision (Split)	3	5:00	For the Vacant KSW Light Heavyweight Championship.
Welterweight 77 kg	(Poland) Kamil Szymuszowski	def.	(Poland) Maciej Jewtuszko	Decision (Unanimous)	3	5:00	
Middleweight 84 kg	(Turkey) Aziz Karaoglu	def.	(Angola) Jay Silva	TKO (Punches)	1	1:34	
Light Heavyweight 93 kg	(Poland) Tomasz Narkun	def.	(Poland) Karol Celiński	Submission (Rear-Naked Choke)	1	2:17	
Heavyweight 120 kg	(Poland) Jędrzej Maćkowiak	def.	(Poland) Michał Gulaś	TKO (Punches)	1	4:57	
Lightweight 70 kg	(Poland) Grzegorz Szulakowski	def.	(Poland) Patryk Grudniewski	Submission (Rear-Naked Choke)	2	3:38	

== KSW 32: Road to Wembley ==
KSW 32: Road to Wembley
- Promotion: Konfrontacja Sztuk Walki
- Date: October 31, 2015
- Venue: Wembley Arena
- City: London, England
- Attendance: 9,401

Event chronology
KSW 31	KSW 32: Road to Wembley	KSW 33

KSW 32 was a mixed martial arts event held on October 31, 2015, at the Wembley Arena in London, England.

=== Results ===
Fight Card
Weight Class				Method	Round	Time	Notes
Heavyweight 120 kg	(Australia) Peter Graham	def.	(Poland) Mariusz Pudzianowski	TKO (Punches and Elbows)	2	2:00	
Welterweight 77 kg	(Poland) Borys Mańkowski (c)	def.	(United States) Jesse Taylor	Submission (Guillotine Choke)	1	3:02	For the KSW Welterweight Championship.
Heavyweight 120 kg	(England) James McSweeney	def.	(Poland) Marcin Różalski	Submission (Rear Naked Choke)	1	2:13	
Light Heavyweight 93 kg	(Poland) Tomasz Narkun	def.	(Croatia) Goran Reljic (c)	TKO (Punches)	1	1:55	For the KSW Light Heavyweight Championship.
Lightweight 70 kg	(Poland) Mateusz Gamrot	def.	(Russia) Marif Piraev	TKO (Punches)	2	3:21	
Welterweight 77 kg	(England) Jim Wallhead	def.	(Poland) Rafał Moks	KO (Punches)	2	2:26	
Heavyweight 120 kg	(England) Oli Thompson	def.	(Poland) Michał Włodarek	Disqualification (Illegal Knee)	3	3:00	
Middleweight 84 kg	(Brazil) Maiquel Falcao	def.	(United States) Brett Cooper	KO (Punch)	1	0:59	
Lightweight 70 kg	(Poland) Leszek Krakowski	def.	(England) Andre Winner	Decision (Unanimous)	3	5:00	

== KSW 33: Materla vs. Khalidov ==
KSW 33: Materla vs. Khalidov
- Promotion: Konfrontacja Sztuk Walki
- Date: November 28, 2015
- Venue: Tauron Arena Kraków
- City: Kraków, Poland
- Attendance: 16,497

Event chronology
KSW 32	KSW 33: Materla vs. Khalidov	KSW 34

KSW 33 was a mixed martial arts event held on November 28, 2015, at the Tauron Arena in Kraków, Poland.

=== Background ===
UFC veteran Tomasz Drwal was expected to face Aziz Karaoglu on his way to a KSW Middleweight Championship bout against winner of the main event of KSW 33, but Drwal pulled out due to a knee injury. He was replaced by Maiquel Falcao.

Ariane Lipski also replaced Kamila Porczyk who pulled out from her match against Katarzyna Lubonska due to injury.

Bonuses:

- Fight of the Night: Artur Sowiński vs. Kleber Koike Erbst
- Performance of the Night: Mamed Khalidov and Karol Bedorf

=== Results ===
Fight Card
Weight Class				Method	Round	Time	Notes
Middleweight 84 kg	(Poland) Mamed Khalidov	def.	(Poland) Michał Materla (c)	TKO (Flying Knee and Punches)	1	0:31	For the KSW Middleweight Championship.
Heavyweight 120 kg	(Poland) Karol Bedorf (c)	def.	(Poland) Michal Kita	TKO (Head Kick)	2	2:46	For the KSW Heavyweight Championship.
Featherweight 66 kg	(Poland) Artur Sowiński	def.	(Japan) Kleber Koike Erbst	Decision (Unanimous)	3	5:00	For the Inaugural KSW Featherweight Championship.
Middleweight 84 kg	(Turkey) Aziz Karaoglu	def.	(Brazil) Maiquel Falcao	TKO (Punches)	1	0:30	
Female Flyweight 57 kg	(Brazil) Ariane Lipski	def.	(Poland) Katarzyna Lubonska	TKO (Kick to the Body and Punches)	2	3:25	
Lightweight 70 kg	(Poland) Lukasz Chlewicki	def.	(Poland) Bartlomiej Kurczewski	Decision (Unanimous)	3	5:00	
Welterweight 77 kg	(Poland) Kamil Szymuszowski	def.	(Germany) David Zawada	Decision (Split)	3	5:00	
Featherweight 66 kg	(Russia) Anzor Azhiev	def.	(Montenegro) Vaso Bakočević	Submission (Triangle Choke)	3	1:39	
Middleweight 84 kg	(Poland) Lukasz Bienkowski	def.	(Poland) Piotr Wawrzyniak	Decision (Majority)	3	5:00	
