= Sękocin Nowy =

Sękocin Stary
- Village
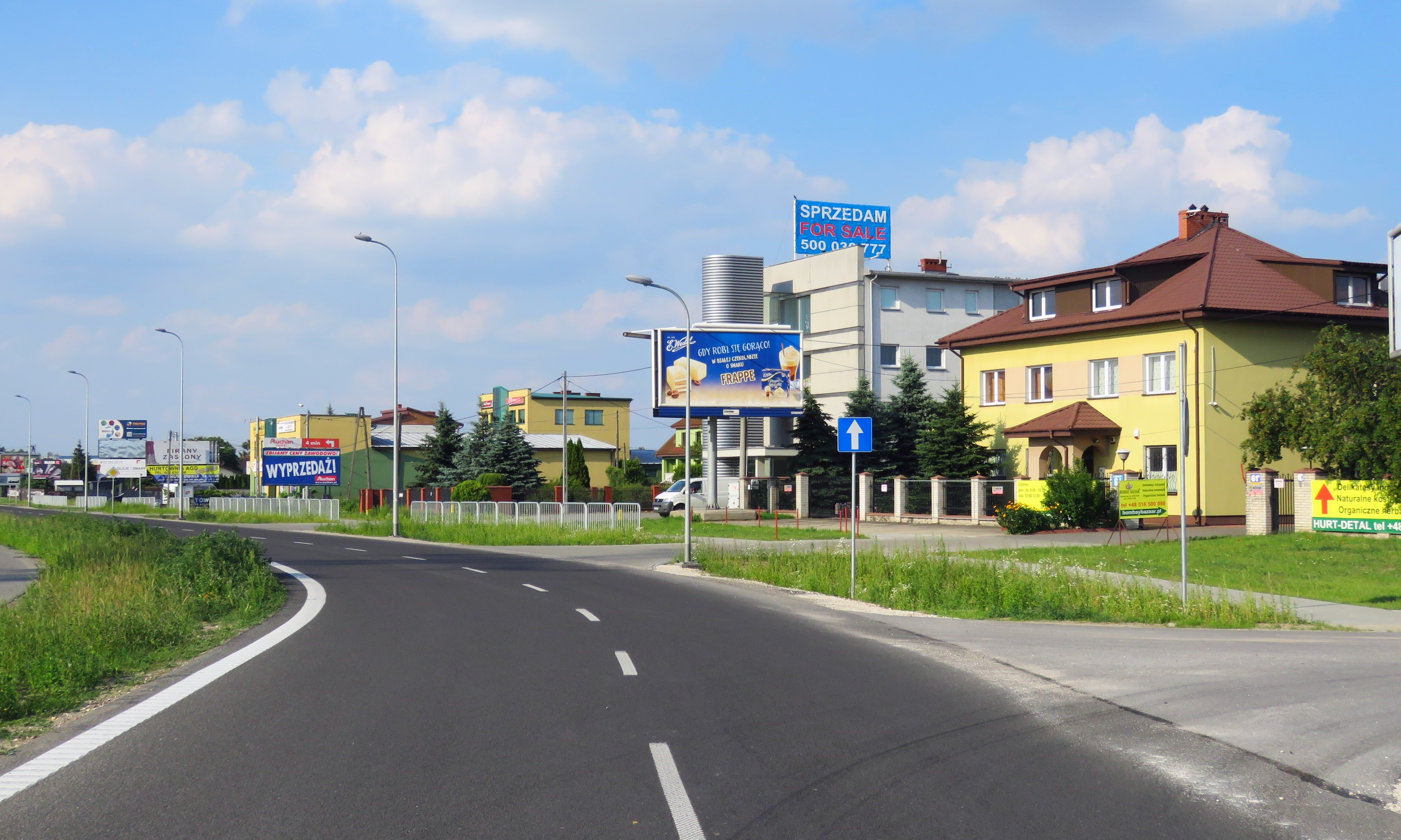

- Location within Poland
- Coordinates: 52°6′58″N 20°53′33″E
- Country: Poland
- Voivodeship: Masovian
- County: Pruszków
- Gmina: Raszyn
- Population: 378

Sękocin Nowy (Polish pronunciation: [sɛŋˈkɔt͡ɕin ˈnɔvɨ]) is a village in the administrative district of Gmina Raszyn, within Pruszków County, Masovian Voivodeship, in east-central Poland.
