= Orlowski =

Family name

Orłowski, Orlowski (feminine: Orłowska) is a Polish toponymic surname derived from any of the places named Orlowo, Orłów (disambiguation). It eventually derived from Proto-Slavic *orьlъ ("eagle"). It has various spellings in different countries. In certain languages, it also has feminine forms.

== Related surnames ==
Language	Masculine	Feminine
Polish	Orłowski	Orłowska
Belarusian (Romanization)	Арлоўскі (Arloŭski, Arlowski)	Арлоўская (Arlouskaya, Arloŭskaja, Arlowskaya)
Bulgarian (Romanization)	Орловски (Orlovski)	Орловска (Orlovska)
Latvian	Orlovskis	Orlovska
Lithuanian	Arlauskas; Orlauskas	Arlauskienė (married), Arlauskaitė (unmarried); Orlauskienė (married), Orlauskaitė (unmarried)
Romanian/Moldovan	Orlovschi, Orlovschii	
Russian (Romanization)	Орловский (Orlovskiy, Orlovskii, Orlovskij, Orlovsky, Orlovski)	Орловская (Orlovskaya, Orlovskaia, Orlovskaja)
Ukrainian (Romanization)	Орловський (Orlovskyi, Orlovskyy, Orlovskyj, Orlovsky)	Орловська (Orlovska)
Other	Orlowsky, Orlofsky, Orlofski, Arlovski	

== People ==
Notable people with the surname include:

- Aleksander Orłowski (1777–1832), Polish painter
- Alice Orlowski (1903–1976), German SS official
- Andrew Orlowski (born 1966), British columnist
- Ewa Orłowska (born 1935), Polish logician
- Hans Orlowski (1894–1967), German woodcut artist and painter
- Jeff Orlowski, American filmmaker
- Jerzy Orłowski (1925–2015), Polish footballer
- Manja Schüle (née Orlowski; born 1976), German politician
- Maria Orłowska (born 1951), Polish computer scientist
- Milan Orlowski (born 1952), Czech table tennis player
- Richard Orlowski (born 1957), Polish-born American soccer coach
- Stefanja Orlowska (born 1987), Australian actress and writer
- Teresa Orlowski (born 1953), Polish-born adult film actress and producer
- Witold Orłowski (born 1962), Polish professor of economics
- Wojciech Orłowski (born 1981), Polish wrestler and mixed martial artist
- Zuzanna Orłowska (died after 1583), mistress of Polish King Sigismund II Augustus

== Fictional characters ==
- Orlowski, Orlowska from the 1923 German silent film The Affair of Baroness Orlowska
