= Arlauskas =

- Lithuanian surname
- m.: Arlauskas
- f.: (unmarried): Arlauskaitė
- f.: (married): Arlauskienė
- f.: (short): Arlauskė
- Related names: Orlowski/Orlovsky/Arlouski

Arlauskas is a Lithuanian-language surname. People with this name include:

- Algis Arlauskas (born 1957), Russian-Spanish actor
- Andrius Arlauskas (born 1986), a Lithuanian football midfielder
- Aurelija Arlauskienė, Lithuanian journalist
- Justė Arlauskaitė (born 1988), Lithuanian singer
- Mykolas Arlauskas (1930–2020, near Liepāja, Latvia), a Latvia-born Lithuanian agronomist, professor of biomedicine
- Natalija Arlauskaitė, Lithuanian visual art and film researcher
- Olga Arlauskas (born 1981), Russian-Spanish film director
- Romanas Arlauskas (1917–2009, Kaunas, Lithuania), a Lithuanian-born Australian chess master
- Ramunė Arlauskienė (born 1973), a Lithuanian female mountain bike orienteer
- Zuzana Arlauskaitė-Mikšienė (1889–1973), Lithuanian and American actress and director

== See also ==
- Artūras Orlauskas (born 1962), Lithuanian comedian, actor, politician
