= Orlovskyi =

Orlovskyi, Orlovskyy, Orlovskyj (Ukrainian: Орловський) are transliterations of the Ukrainian surname equivalent to Polish Orlowski. Feminine form: Orlovska (Орловськa). It may also be transliterated as "Orlovsky". Notable people with the surname include:

- Borys Orlovskyi, Ukrainian professional footballer
