= Andriuškevičius =

Andriuškevičius is a Lithuanian-language surname derived from Andriuška, a historical diminutive of Andrius.

Slavic counterparts include Polish: Andruszkiewicz and Russian/Belarusian: Andryushkevich (Russian: Андрюшкевич).

Notable people with the surname include:

- Aleksas Andriuškevičius (born 1959), Lithuanian artist
- Alfonsas Andriuškevičius (born 1940), Lithuanian poet and art historian
- Gintaras Andriuškevičius (born 1975), Lithuanian race walker
- Martynas Andriuškevičius (born 1986), Lithuanian basketball player who played in the National Basketball Association
- Vytautas Andriuškevičius (born 1990), Lithuanian footballer
