= Artur Sowiński =

Polish mixed martial artist (born 1987)

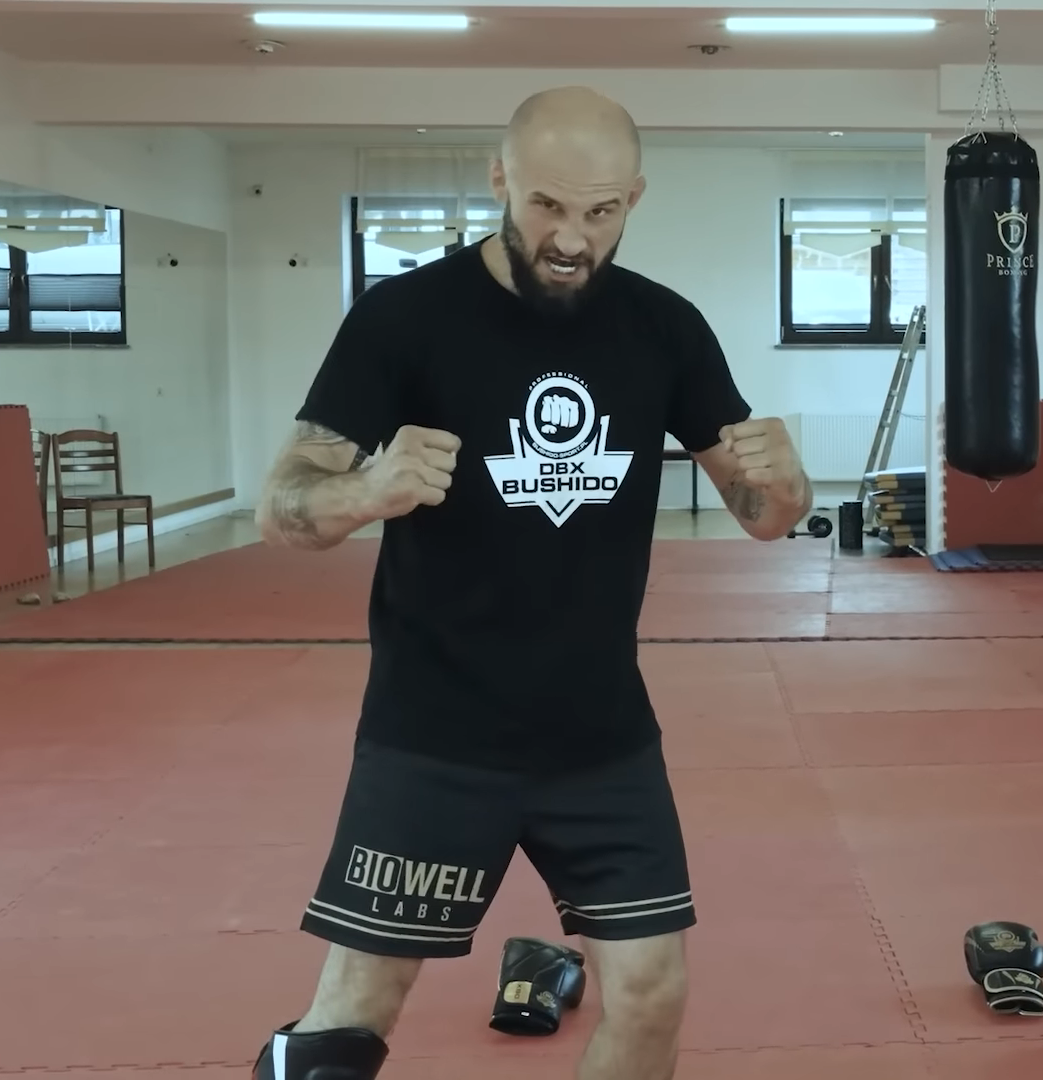
- Sowiński in 2023
- Born: March 26, 1987 (age 39); Radzionków, Poland
- Other names: Kornik
- Height: 5 ft 10 in (1.78 m)
- Weight: 177 lb (80 kg; 12 st 9 lb)
- Division: Featherweight (2013–2018); Lightweight (2007–2013, 2019–present); Middleweight (2025)
- Reach: 74 in (188 cm)
- Style: Karate and Brazilian jiu-jitsu
- Stance: Orthodox
- Fighting out of: Radzionków, Poland
- Team: Silesian Cage Club
- Years active: 2007–present

Kickboxing record
- Total: 4
- Wins: 3
- Draws: 1

Mixed martial arts record
- Total: 45
- Wins: 26
- By knockout: 9
- By submission: 8
- By decision: 8
- By disqualification: 1
- Losses: 15
- By knockout: 3
- By submission: 5
- By decision: 7
- No contests: 4

Other information
- Mixed martial arts record from Sherdog

Artur Sowiński (born March 26, 1987) is a Polish professional mixed martial artist and kickboxer. He currently competes in the Lightweight division. He is a former KSW Featherweight champion.

== Mixed martial arts career ==
=== Early career ===
Sowiński made his professional debut on September 7, 2007 against Sonny Nielsen. Sowiński lost the fight via a first round submission.

After accumulating a record of 4–1, Sowiński faced future Bellator and UFC fighter, Marcin Held. Sowiński lost the fight via Majority Decision.

=== First KSW stint and Celtic Gladiator ===
After racking up a record of 8–3, Sowiński joined KSW. In his first fight, he faced Danny van Bergen in the first round of the Lightweight Tournament. Sowiński lost the fight via a first round TKO.

His next fight came four months later against Paul Reed. Sowiński won the fight via a first round TKO.

He made his debut with Celtic Gladiator two months later against Carl Morley. Sowiński won the fight via a first round TKO.

His next fight with KSW came two months later against Cengiz Dana. Sowiński won the fight via Unanimous Decision.

A month later, he returned to the cage for Celtic Gladiator. He faced off against future UFC double champion, Conor McGregor. Sowiński lost the fight via a second round TKO.

His next fight came five months later against Maciej Jewtuszko under the KSW banner. Sowiński won the fight via a first round TKO, and also earned himself a Knockout of the Night bonus.

=== Second KSW Stint ===
==== KSW featherweight champion ====
After 7 fights, he faced Kleber Koike Erbst for the innagural KSW Featherweight championship. Sowiński won the fight via Unanimous Decision, and thus claimed his first career championship, and claimed a Fight of the Night bonus.

His first title defense came four months later against Fabiano Silva. Sowiński successfully retained his title via Unanimous Decision.

His next title defense came nine months later against Marcin Wrzosek. This time, however, Sowiński lost the fight after a doctor stoppage in the second round, and thus losing his championship.

=== Return to regionals ===
10 fights and 6 years later, it was announced that Sowiński was no longer a part of KSW. In his first fight outside of the promotion, he faced Anton Kuivanen for the vacant EFM Lightweight Championship. Sowiński won the fight via Majority Decision, and thus claimed his second career championship.

He returned to KSW for one more fight nine months later against Donovan Desmae. Sowiński lost the fight via a second round submission. Despite the loss, Sowiński earned a Fight of the Night bonus.

After officially leaving KSW, his next fight came five months later under the promotion Prime Show MMA. He faced Adam Okniński. Sowiński won the fight via Unanimous Decision.

His next fight came two months later for the promotion CAVEMMA. He faced Kamil Łebkowski. This fight was under the Pride Rules. Sowiński won the fight via Unanimous Decision.

His next fight came six months later for the promotion USWM. He faced Kamil Łebkowski in a rematch. This bout ended as a No Contest after Łebkowski delivered an illegal knee, and Sowiński was unable to continue.

His next fight came ten months later under the promotion The Warriors MMA. He faced Michał Kornacki. Sowiński won the fight via a first round TKO.

Following a year and a half hiatus, he returned on September 26, 2025 against Kacper Cholewa under Strife MMA. Sowiński lost the fight via a second-round TKO.

He returned two months later in a rematch against Patryk Chrobak under MMA Attack. The two faced a year prior in an exhibition boxing bout. This bout was Sowiński's Middleweight debut. The fight ended fifteen seconds in, after an accidental eye poke rendered Chrobak unable to continue, with the result being a no contest.

He returned three months later against Michał Kornacki in a rematch two years after their last bout under the promotion Dragon Fight Night. Sowiński won the fight via a first-round submission.

== Kickboxing career ==
Sowiński made his kickboxing debut on January 21, 2018 against Lubo Slovik. Sowiński won the fight via Unanimous Decision.

His next fight came four years later against Piotr Ćwik. Sowiński won the fight via Unanimous Decision.

His next fight came over a year later against Andreo Kolić. This fight was ruled a Draw.

His next fight came eight months later against Adrian Bolechnowicz. Sowiński won the fight via Unanimous Decision.

== Bare-knuckle boxing career ==
Sowiński made his bare-knuckle boxing debut on December 20, 2025 against Vaso Bakočević. The two previously met 11 years prior in an MMA bout. Sowiński won the fight via a first-round knockout.

His next fight came on May 23, 2026, against Adam Ugorski. Sowiński won the fight via a Unanimous Decision.

== Championships and accomplishments ==
=== Mixed martial arts ===
==== Konfrontacja Sztuk Walki ====
- KSW Featherweight Championship (One time; former)
- One successful title defense
- Fight of the Night (Three times)
- Submission of the Night (One time)
- Knockout of the Night (One time)

==== EFM Show ====
EFM Lightweight Championship (One time; former)

== Mixed martial arts record ==
Professional record breakdown
45 matches	26 wins	15 losses
By knockout	9	3
By submission	8	5
By decision	8	7
By disqualification	1	0
No contests	4	

Res.	Record	Opponent	Method	Event	Date	Round	Time	Location	Notes
Win	26–15 (4)	Michał Kornacki	Submission (rear-naked choke)	Dragon Fight Night 8	February 20, 2026	1	3:00	Tłuszcz, Poland	
NC	25–15 (4)	Patryk Chrobak	NC (accidental eye poke)	MMA Attack 6	November 28, 2025	1	0:13	Będzin, Poland	Middleweight debut; Accidental eye poke rendered Chrobak unable to continue.
Loss	25–15 (3)	Kacper Cholewa	TKO (punches)	Strife 15	September 26, 2025	2	2:47	Grodzisk Mazowiecki, Poland	Catchweight (161 lb) bout.
Win	25–14 (3)	Michał Kornacki	TKO (retirement)	The Wariors MMA 3	May 25, 2024	1	5:00	Mysłowice, Poland	
NC	24–14 (3)	Kamil Łebkowski	NC (illegal knee)	USWM MMA Cup 31	July 7, 2023	2	3:06	Grajewo, Poland	Accidental illegal knee rendered Sowiński unable to continue.
Win	24–14 (2)	Kamil Łebkowski	Decision (unanimous)	CaveMMA 2	January 13, 2023	3	5:00	Jastrzębie-Zdrój, Poland	Pride rules.
Win	23–14 (2)	Adam Okniński	Decision (unanimous)	Prime Show MMA 4	November 26, 2022	3	5:00	Szczecin, Poland	
Loss	22–14 (2)	Donovan Desmae	Submission (rear-naked choke)	KSW 71	June 18, 2022	2	2:42	Toruń, Poland	Fight of the Night.
Win	22–13 (2)	Anton Kuivanen	Decision (majority)	EFM Show 2	September 11, 2021	5	5:00	Sofia, Bulgaria	Won the vacant EFM Lightweight championship.
Loss	21–13 (2)	Sebastian Rajewski	Decision (split)	KSW 62	July 17, 2021	3	5:00	Warsaw, Poland	Fight of the Night.
Loss	21–12 (2)	Borys Mańkowski	Decision (unanimous)	KSW 57	December 19, 2020	3	5:00	Łódź, Poland	
Win	21–11 (2)	Gracjan Szadziński	TKO (knees and punches)	KSW 53	July 11, 2020	1	2:04	Warsaw, Poland	
Win	20–11 (2)	Vinicius Bohrer	TKO (head kick and punches)	KSW 52	December 7, 2019	1	0:51	Gliwice, Poland	
Loss	19–11 (2)	Norman Parke	Decision (unanimous)	KSW 49	May 18, 2019	3	5:00	Gdańsk, Poland	Catchweight (163 lb) bout.
Win	19–10 (2)	Kamil Szymuszowski	Decision (unanimous)	KSW 46	December 1, 2018	3	5:00	Gliwice, Poland	Return to Lightweight.
Loss	18–10 (2)	Salahdine Parnasse	Decision (unanimous)	KSW 43	April 14, 2018	3	5:00	Wrocław, Poland	
Loss	18–9 (2)	Kleber Koike Erbst	Submission (rear-naked choke)	KSW 41	December 23, 2017	3	3:56	Katowice, Poland	For the vacant KSW Featherweight Championship. Koike missed weight (148.2 lb) and was stripped of the title. Only Sowiński was eligible to win the title.
Win	18–8 (2)	Łukasz Chlewicki	Submission (triangle choke)	KSW 38	April 7, 2017	1	1:51	Sękocin Nowy, Poland	Submission of the Night.
Loss	17–8 (2)	Marcin Wrzosek	TKO (doctor stoppage)	KSW 37	December 3, 2016	2	2:55	Kraków, Poland	Lost the KSW Featherweight Championship.
Win	17–7 (2)	Fabiano Silva	Decision (unanimous)	KSW 34	March 5, 2016	5	5:00	Warsaw, Poland	Defended the KSW Featherweight Championship.
Win	16–7 (2)	Kleber Koike Erbst	Decision (unanimous)	KSW 33	November 28, 2015	5	5:00	Kraków, Poland	Won the inaugural KSW Featherweight Championship. Fight of the Night.
Win	15–7 (2)	Vaso Bakočević	Decision (split)	KSW 29	December 6, 2014	3	5:00	Kraków, Poland	
Win	14–7 (2)	Anzor Azhiev	DQ (illegal knee)	KSW 26	March 22, 2014	1	3:07	Warsaw, Poland	
NC	13–7 (2)	Anzor Azhiev	NC (accidental clash of heads)	KSW 24	September 28, 2013	1	1:54	Łódź, Poland	Featherweight debut. Accidental clash of heads rendered Sowiński unable to continue.
Win	13–7 (1)	Michal Kozmer	TKO (punches)	Celtic Gladiator 6	February 9, 2013	1	4:35	Dublin, Ireland	
Loss	12–7 (1)	Maciej Jewtuszko	Submission (brabo choke)	KSW 21	December 1, 2012	2	4:01	Warsaw, Poland	For the inaugural KSW Lightweight Championship.
NC	12–6 (1)	Artem Lobov	NC (overturned)	Celtic Gladiator 5	September 22, 2012	3	5:00	Dublin, Ireland	Originally a majority decision win for Lobov; overturned by promoter after Sowiński appealed the decision.
Loss	12–6	Curt Warburton	Submission (arm-triangle choke)	KSW 18	February 25, 2012	2	3:03	Płock, Poland	
Win	12–5	Maciej Jewtuszko	KO (punches)	KSW 17	November 26, 2011	1	0:46	Łódź, Poland	Knockout of the Night.
Loss	11–5	Conor McGregor	TKO (punches)	Celtic Gladiator 2	June 11, 2011	2	1:12	Portlaoise, Ireland	
Win	11–4	Cengiz Dana	Decision (unanimous)	KSW 16	May 21, 2011	2	5:00	Gdańsk, Poland	
Win	10–4	Carl Morley	TKO (punches)	Celtic Gladiator 1	March 18, 2011	1	0:16	Portlaoise, Ireland	
Win	9–4	Paul Reed	TKO (punches)	KSW Extra 2	January 29, 2011	1	2:45	Ełk, Poland	
Loss	8–4	Danny van Bergen	Decision (unanimous)	KSW 14	September 18, 2010	3	5:00	Łódź, Poland	2010 KSW Lightweight Grand Prix Quarterfinal.
Loss	8–3	Niko Puhakka	Decision (unanimous)	Fight Festival: Goes Kaisaniemi	June 15, 2010	3	5:00	Helsinki, Finland	
Win	8–2	Jan David	TKO (punches)	Extreme Fight Arena 1	May 28, 2010	1	0:29	Zielona Góra, Poland	
Win	7–2	Paweł Żydak	Submission (triangle choke)	International FC: Tsunami Tournament 1	March 18, 2010	1	4:22	Debrzno, Poland	
Win	6–2	Piotr Kurowski	Submission (triangle choke)	Bushido 6	January 8, 2010	2	2:47	Piła, Poland	
Win	5–2	Mateusz Piórkowski	Submission (armbar)	Polish Amateur MMA Association: Southern Poland Championships	October 18, 2009	1	2:54	Katowice, Poland	
Loss	4–2	Marcin Held	Decision (majority)	MMA Challengers 1	May 3, 2009	2	5:00	Mysłowice, Poland	
Win	4–1	Craig Jose	Submission (rear-naked choke)	10th Legion - The War Machine	April 5, 2009	1	1:56	Kingston upon Hull, England	
Win	3–1	Keith Norton	Submission (kimura)	Ring of Truth 8	February 28, 2009	1	1:11	Trenčín, Slovakia	
Win	2–1	Zaurbek Muchaev	KO (head kick)	Pro Fight 3	February 22, 2009	1	2:01	Olsztyn, Poland	
Win	1–1	Daniel Tobolik	Submission (triangle choke)	Bytomska Gala MMA 1	November 15, 2008	1	1:14	Bytom, Poland	
Loss	0–1	Sonny Nielsen	Submission (armbar)	Nord Bohemia Ring 3	September 7, 2007	1	3:57	Česká Lípa, Czech Republic	Lightweight debut.

== Kickboxing record ==
Professional Kickboxing Record
3 Wins (0 (T)KO's), 0 Losses, 1 Draw
Date	Result	Opponent	Event	Location	Method	Round	Time
2024-07-06	Win	(Poland) Adrian Bolechowicz	Kuyavian Cage	Inowrocław, Poland	Decision (Unanimous)	3	3:00
2023-11-11	Draw	(Croatia) Andreo Kolić	Lewy Prosty Fight Night 4	Opole, Poland	Decision (Draw)	3	3:00
2022-09-24	Win	(Poland) Piotr Ćwik	MMA Attack 4	Będzin, Poland	Decision (Unanimous)	3	3:00
2018-01-21	Win	(Slovakia) Lubo Slovik	Cage Ring Championship 7: Annihilation	Dublin, Ireland	Decision (Unanimous)	3	3:00

== Exhibition boxing record ==
3 fights	1 win	2 losses
By knockout	0	1
By decision	1	1

No.	Result	Record	Opponent	Type	Round, time	Date	Location	Notes
3	Loss	1–2	Aslambek Arsamikov	TKO	2 (4) 0:14	23 Nov 2024	Hala Urania, Olsztyn, Poland	
2	Win	1–1	Patryk Chrobak	UD	3	14 Sep 2024	Amfiteatr w Ustroniu, Ustroń, Poland	
1	Loss	0–1	Łukasz Szulc	UD	3	1 Mar 2024	Hala Widowiskowo-Sportowa, Piła, Poland	

== Bare-knuckle boxing record ==
Professional record breakdown
2 matches	2 wins	0 losses
By knockout	1	0
By decision	1	0

Res.	Record	Opponent	Method	Event	Date	Round	Time	Location	Notes
Win	2–0	Adam Ugorski	Decision (unanimous)	Fight Mode 1	May 23, 2026	5	2:00	Poznań, Poland	
Win	1–0	Vaso Bakočević	KO (punch)	FNC 26	December 20, 2025	1	0:52	Podgorica, Montenegro	

== Submission grappling record ==
Professional Submission grappling record 2 Matches, 0 Wins (0 Submissions), 0 Losses (0 Submission), 2 Draws
Result	Rec.	Opponent	Method	Event	Date	Location
Draw	0-0-2	(Poland) Artur Piotrowski	Decision (time limit)	DWM Fight Night 2	March 23, 2024	Białogard, Poland
Draw	0-0-1	(Poland) Grzegorz Szulakowski	Decision (time limit)	Solo Combat Federation 4	February 24, 2023	Kępno, Poland
