= Mamed Khalidov =

Russian-Polish mixed martial arts fighter

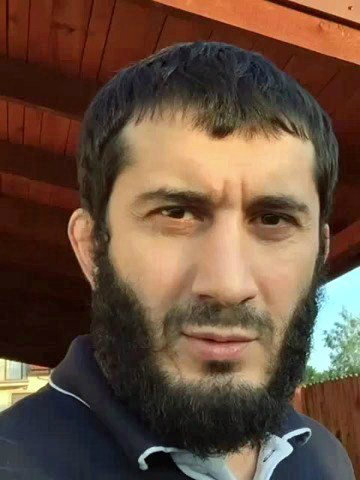
- Khalidov in 2015
- Born: Mamed Khalidov; July 17, 1980 (age 46); Grozny, Chechen–Ingush ASSR, Russian SFSR, Soviet Union
- Native name: Мамед Халидов
- Other names: Cannibal
- Nationality: Russian; Polish
- Height: 6 ft 0 in (183 cm)
- Weight: 186 lb (84 kg; 13 st 4 lb)
- Division: Middleweight; Light heavyweight
- Reach: 75 in (191 cm)
- Style: Kyokushin Karate, Taekwondo, Brazilian Jiu-Jitsu, Wrestling
- Fighting out of: Olsztyn, Poland
- Team: Arrachion MMA Fighters Team Olsztyn; KSW Team
- Rank: Black belt in Kyokushin; Black belt in Taekwondo; Purple belt in Brazilian Jiu-Jitsu
- Years active: 2004–present

Mixed martial arts record
- Total: 49
- Wins: 38
- By knockout: 17
- By submission: 17
- By decision: 4
- Losses: 9
- By knockout: 3
- By submission: 3
- By decision: 3
- Draws: 2

Other information
- Mixed martial arts record from Sherdog

Mamed Khalidov (Russian: Мамед Магомедович Халидов, romanized: Mamed Magomedovich Khalidov, IPA: [mɐˈmʲɛt maɣɔmʲɛdɔvʲit͡ʂ xɐˈlʲidəf]; Polish: Mamed Chalidow [ˈmamɛt xaˈlidɔf]; born 17 July 1980) is a Russian-Polish mixed martial artist. He is best known for competing in the Middleweight division of Polish MMA promotion KSW, where he is the former KSW Light Heavyweight and KSW Middleweight Champions. He is currently ranked #3 in the KSW Middleweight rankings.

== Biography ==
Mamed Khalidov was born in Grozny, Soviet Union (now Chechen Republic of Russian Federation). He began practicing Kyokushin Karate around the age of 12 or 13, where he also holds a black belt. At the age of 17, he fled from his homeland to Poland and continued practicing martial arts, while adding other combat styles to his repertoire such as Taekwondo, Shotokan Karate, Wrestling and Boxing soon after his arrival. He also became competitive in all sports. Later he also became interested about becoming a mixed martial artist and began training Muay Thai, Combat Sambo, and Brazilian Jiu-Jitsu.

== Mixed martial arts career ==
As of December 2011, Khalidov has fought eleven times under the KSW banner, though never featuring in a tournament, instead fighting individually such opponents as Daniel Tabera and Matt Lindland.

Khalidov made his US debut with EliteXC on their October 10, 2008 ShoXC card against American Jason Guida. After almost two hard-fought rounds, Khalidov stopped Guida on the feet with an unanswered torrent of punches.

Following the collapse of EliteXC, Khalidov has expressed interest in a hasty return to KSW, as previously outlined by his signing with ProElite in favor of non-exclusive contract status. Due to a broken hand, Khalidov was unable to return for KSW X on December 12, 2008. Following his recovery, he fought PRIDE veteran Daniel Acacio at KSW XI on 15 May, knocking him out at 1:10 of the first round to win the newly created KSW Light Heavyweight Championship.

Khalidov signed a three-fight deal with World Victory Road Sengoku and his first appearance for the promotion was on the November 7th card against Sengoku middleweight champion Jorge Santiago. Although, the fight was not a title bout, Khalidov defeated Santiago via first-round TKO. A rematch of the bout was held at World Victory Road Presents: Sengoku Raiden Championships 12 on March 7, 2010, for the Middleweight Championship, which Khalidov lost via controversial unanimous decision.

At KSW XIII Mamed fought Ryuta Sakurai to a draw. Sakurai secured a kimura early in the first round, but Khalidov escaped. During the rest of the fight he had 6 submission attempts including 4 guillotine chokes, 1 ankle lock and 1 heel hook, but couldn't force the tap from Sakurai.

Mamed Khalidov was expected to face Thales Leites and later Matt Lindland at KSW XV However, both fighters were pulled from the card. Instead, Khalidov faced James Irvin at the event and won via submission at 0:33 into the first round. He eventually faced Lindland at KSW 16 in May 2011 and won via submission in the first round.

Khalidov was originally scheduled to face Paulo Filho at KSW 17. However, Filho was forced out of the bout due to him going into rehab for a drug addiction and he was replaced by Jesse Taylor. Khalidov won the fight via submission (kneebar) in the first round.

Khalidov next competed against former UFC fighter Rodney Wallace on May 12, 2012, at KSW 19. He won the fight via KO in the first round.

On December 1, 2012, he defeated Kendall Grove and won the fight via submission (achilles lock). Khalidov next faced Melvin Manhoef at KSW 23 on June 8, 2013, winning the fight by front choke in the first round.

On July 30, 2018, it was announced that Khalidov had vacated his middleweight championship belt in order to pursue a rematch against KSW Light Heavyweight champion Tomasz Narkun. On October 9, 2018, it was announced that the rematch would happen at KSW 46: Narkun vs. Khalidov 2 on December 1, 2018. Khalidov lost the rematch via unanimous decision and retired from the sport in the cage.

In September 2019, news surfaced that Khalidov will be returning from retirement to face Scott Askham in a catchweight bout at KSW 52 on December 7, 2019. He lost the fight via unanimous decision.

Khalidov next challenged Scott Askham for the KSW Middleweight Championship in a rematch bout at KSW 55: Askham vs. Khalidov 2 on October 10, 2020. He reclaimed the title via first-minute knockout.

Khalidov defended his title against Roberto Soldić on December 18, 2021, at KSW 65: Khalidov vs. Soldić. He lost the bout and his title via knockout after getting caught with a left hook in the second round.

Khalidov faced Mariusz Pudzianowski at KSW 77: Khalidov vs. Pudzianowski on December 17, 2022. He went on to defeat Pudzianowski via first-round TKO stoppage after Pudzian tapped to ground and pound.

Khalidov faced Scott Askham in trilogy at XTB KSW 83: Colosseum 2 on June 3, 2023. He won the bout in the third round after hitting Askham with flying switch kick and finishing him with punches.

On February 24, 2024, in the main event of XTB KSW Epic: Chalidow vs Adamek, he fought Tomasz Adamek in a boxing match. He lost due to a hand injury after the third round.

== Personal life ==
Khalidov acquired Polish citizenship in 2010.

In June 2019 news surfaced that the police arrested Khalidov due to alleged illegal import of stolen cars. Khalidov is yet to appear before court.

== Championships and accomplishments ==
=== Mixed martial arts ===
- Konfrontacja Sztuk Walki
  - KSW Light Heavyweight Championship (One time; first)
  - KSW Middleweight Championship (Two times; former)
    - One successful title defence
  - Fight of the Night (Three times) vs. Tomasz Narkun (KSW 42, KSW 46), vs. Mankowski (KSW 39)
- Full Contact Prestige
  - FPC Middleweight Championship (One time)

=== Submission grappling ===
- Abu Dhabi Combat Club
  - 2007 ADCC Polish Trials Winner

== Mixed martial arts record ==
Professional record breakdown
49 matches	38 wins	9 losses
By knockout	17	3
By submission	17	3
By decision	4	3
Draws	2	

Res.	Record	Opponent	Method	Event	Date	Round	Time	Location	Notes
Loss	38–9–2	Paweł Pawlak	TKO (elbows)	KSW 117	April 18, 2026	4	4:59	Warsaw, Poland	For the KSW Middleweight Championship.
Win	38–8–2	Adrian Bartosiński	Submission (armbar)	KSW 100	November 16, 2024	2	2:48	Gliwice, Poland	Performance of the Night.
Win	37–8–2	Scott Askham	KO (flying switch kick and punches)	KSW 83	June 3, 2023	3	1:03	Warsaw, Poland	Return to Middleweight. Knockout of the Night.
Win	36–8–2	Mariusz Pudzianowski	TKO (submission to punches)	KSW 77	December 17, 2022	1	1:54	Gliwice, Poland	Heavyweight debut.
Loss	35–8–2	Roberto Soldić	KO (punch)	KSW 65	December 18, 2021	2	3:40	Gliwice, Poland	Lost the KSW Middleweight Championship.
Win	35–7–2	Scott Askham	KO (flying switch kick)	KSW 55	October 10, 2020	1	0:36	Łódź, Poland	Won the KSW Middleweight Championship. Knockout of the Night.
Loss	34–7–2	Scott Askham	Decision (unanimous)	KSW 52	December 7, 2019	3	5:00	Gliwice, Poland	Catchweight (187 lb) bout.
Loss	34–6–2	Tomasz Narkun	Decision (unanimous)	KSW 46	December 1, 2018	3	5:00	Gliwice, Poland	Catchweight (203 lb) bout. Fight of the Night.
Loss	34–5–2	Tomasz Narkun	Submission (triangle choke)	KSW 42	March 3, 2018	3	1:18	Łódź, Poland	Catchweight (203 lb) bout. Fight of the Night.
Win	34–4–2	Borys Mańkowski	Decision (unanimous)	KSW 39	May 27, 2017	3	5:00	Warsaw, Poland	Catchweight (181 lb) bout. Fight of the Night
Win	33–4–2	Luke Barnatt	KO (punches)	ACB 54	March 11, 2017	1	0:21	Manchester, England	
Win	32–4–2	Aziz Karaoglu	Decision (majority)	KSW 35	May 27, 2016	3	5:00	Gdańsk, Poland	Defended the KSW Middleweight Championship.
Win	31–4–2	Michał Materla	KO (flying knee and punches)	KSW 33	November 28, 2015	1	0:31	Kraków, Poland	Won the KSW Middleweight Championship. Knockout of the Night.
Win	30–4–2	Brett Cooper	Decision (unanimous)	KSW 29	December 6, 2014	3	5:00	Kraków, Poland	
Win	29–4–2	Maiquel Falcão	Submission (armbar)	KSW 27	May 17, 2014	1	4:52	Gdańsk, Poland	Submission of the Night.
Win	28–4–2	Ryuta Sakurai	Submission (triangle choke)	KSW 25	December 7, 2013	1	2:03	Wrocław, Poland	
Win	27–4–2	Melvin Manhoef	Submission (guillotine choke)	KSW 23	June 8, 2013	1	2:09	Gdańsk, Poland	Catchweight (192 lb) bout. Submission of the Night.
Win	26–4–2	Kendall Grove	Submission (achilles lock)	KSW 21	December 1, 2012	2	3:27	Warsaw, Poland	Return to Middleweight. Submission of the Night.
Win	25–4–2	Rodney Wallace	KO (punch)	KSW 19	May 12, 2012	1	1:55	Łódź, Poland	Catchweight (187 lb) bout. Knockout of the Night.
Win	24–4–2	Jesse Taylor	Submission (kneebar)	KSW 17	November 26, 2011	1	1:42	Łódź, Poland	Catchweight (187 lb) bout. Submission of the Night.
Win	23–4–2	Matt Lindland	Technical Submission (guillotine choke)	KSW 16	May 21, 2011	1	1:35	Gdańsk, Poland	Catchweight (187 lb) bout.
Win	22–4–2	James Irvin	Submission (armbar)	KSW 15	March 19, 2011	1	0:33	Warsaw, Poland	Catchweight (200.6 lb) bout; Irvin missed weight.
Win	21–4–2	Yuki Sasaki	TKO (punches)	World Victory Road Presents: Sengoku 16	December 30, 2010	1	2:22	Tokyo, Japan	
Draw	20–4–2	Ryuta Sakurai	Draw (unanimous)	KSW 13	May 7, 2010	4	3:00	Katowice, Poland	Retained the KSW Light Heavyweight Championship.
Loss	20–4–1	Jorge Santiago	Decision (unanimous)	World Victory Road Presents: Sengoku 12	March 7, 2010	5	5:00	Tokyo, Japan	For the Sengoku Middleweight Championship.
Win	20–3–1	Jorge Santiago	TKO (punches)	World Victory Road Presents: Sengoku 11	November 7, 2009	1	2:45	Tokyo, Japan	Non-title bout.
Win	19–3–1	Daniel Acácio	KO (punches)	KSW 11	May 15, 2009	1	1:10	Warsaw, Poland	Won the inaugural KSW Light Heavyweight Championship.
Win	18–3–1	Jason Guida	TKO (punches)	ShoXC: Elite Challenger Series 5	October 10, 2008	2	4:53	Hammond, Indiana, United States	
Draw	17–3–1	Daniel Tabera	Draw	KSW Extra 1	September 13, 2008	3	3:00	Dabrowa Górnicza, Poland	Light Heavyweight debut.
Win	17–3	Valdas Pocevicius	Submission (guillotine choke)	KSW 9	May 9, 2008	1	0:52	Warsaw, Poland	
Win	16–3	Petr Ondrus	TKO (hand injury)	KSW Elimination 2	March 29, 2008	2	5:00	Wrocław, Poland	
Win	15–3	Dave Dalgliesh	Submission (armbar)	KSW 8	November 10, 2007	1	1:52	Warsaw, Poland	Openweight bout.
Win	14–3	Martin Zawada	Submission (toe hold)	KSW Elimination 1	September 15, 2007	1	4:22	Warsaw, Poland	
Win	13–3	Igor Pokrajac	Submission (kneebar)	Boxing Explosion 2	August 2, 2007	2	2:33	Zagreb, Croatia	
Win	12–3	Alexander Stefanovic	TKO (punches)	KSW 7	June 2, 2007	1	3:01	Warsaw, Poland	Openweight bout.
Win	11–3	Tor Troéng	Submission (triangle choke)	Full Contact Prestige 3	February 25, 2007	1	0:55	Poznań, Poland	
Win	10–3	Michal Garnys	TKO (punches)	Extreme Cage 2	November 19, 2006	3	0:11	Warsaw, Poland	
Win	9–3	Rashid Magomadov	Submission (triangle choke)	President's Cup: Muay Thai Tournament	September 2, 2006	1	2:45	Grozny, Russia	
Win	8–3	Jacek Buczko	TKO (punches)	Full Contact Prestige 2	April 8, 2006	1	4:51	Warsaw, Poland	Won the FCP Middleweight Championship.
Win	7–3	Andrzej Kosecki	TKO (submission to strikes)	Extreme Cage 1	March 5, 2006	1	3:27	Warsaw, Poland	
Win	6–3	Pawel Krys	KO (punch)	Full Contact Prestige	January 15, 2006	1	0:45	Warsaw, Poland	
Win	5–3	Andre Reinders	KO (punch)	MMA Sport 3	October 15, 2005	1	0:39	Warsaw, Poland	
Win	4–3	Danielius Razmus	Submission (twister)	MMA Sport 3	October 15, 2005	1	1:46	Warsaw, Poland	
Loss	3–3	Valdas Pocevicius	Submission (rear-naked choke)	Shooto Lithuania: Gladiators 2	September 22, 2005	1	3:15	Vilnius, Lithuania	
Win	3–2	Adam Skupien	KO (head kick)	MMA Sport 2	May 28, 2005	1	0:06	Warsaw, Poland	
Win	2–2	Marek Krajewski	TKO (Punches)	MMA Sport 1	March 18, 2005	1	2:34	Warsaw, Poland	
Win	1–2	Pawel Klimiewicz	Decision (unanimous)	Shidokan Poland Gala	December 5, 2004	3	5:00	Warsaw, Poland	
Loss	0–2	Grazhuydas Smailis	Submission (rear-naked choke)	Shooto Lithuania: Gladiators	September 29, 2004	1	1:54	Vilnius, Lithuania	
Loss	0–1	Nerijus Valiukevicius	TKO (punches)	Shooto Lithuania: Bushido King	May 18, 2004	1	4:49	Vilnius, Lithuania	

== Exhibition boxing record ==
1 fight	0 wins	1 loss
By knockout	0	1

No.	Result	Record	Opponent	Type	Round, time	Date	Location	Notes
1	Loss	0–1	Tomasz Adamek	TKO	3 (6), 3:00	24 Feb 2024	Arena Gliwice, Gliwice, Poland	

== See also ==
- List of current KSW fighters
- List of male mixed martial artists
- Double champions in MMA
