= Attila Végh =

Slovakian mixed martial artist

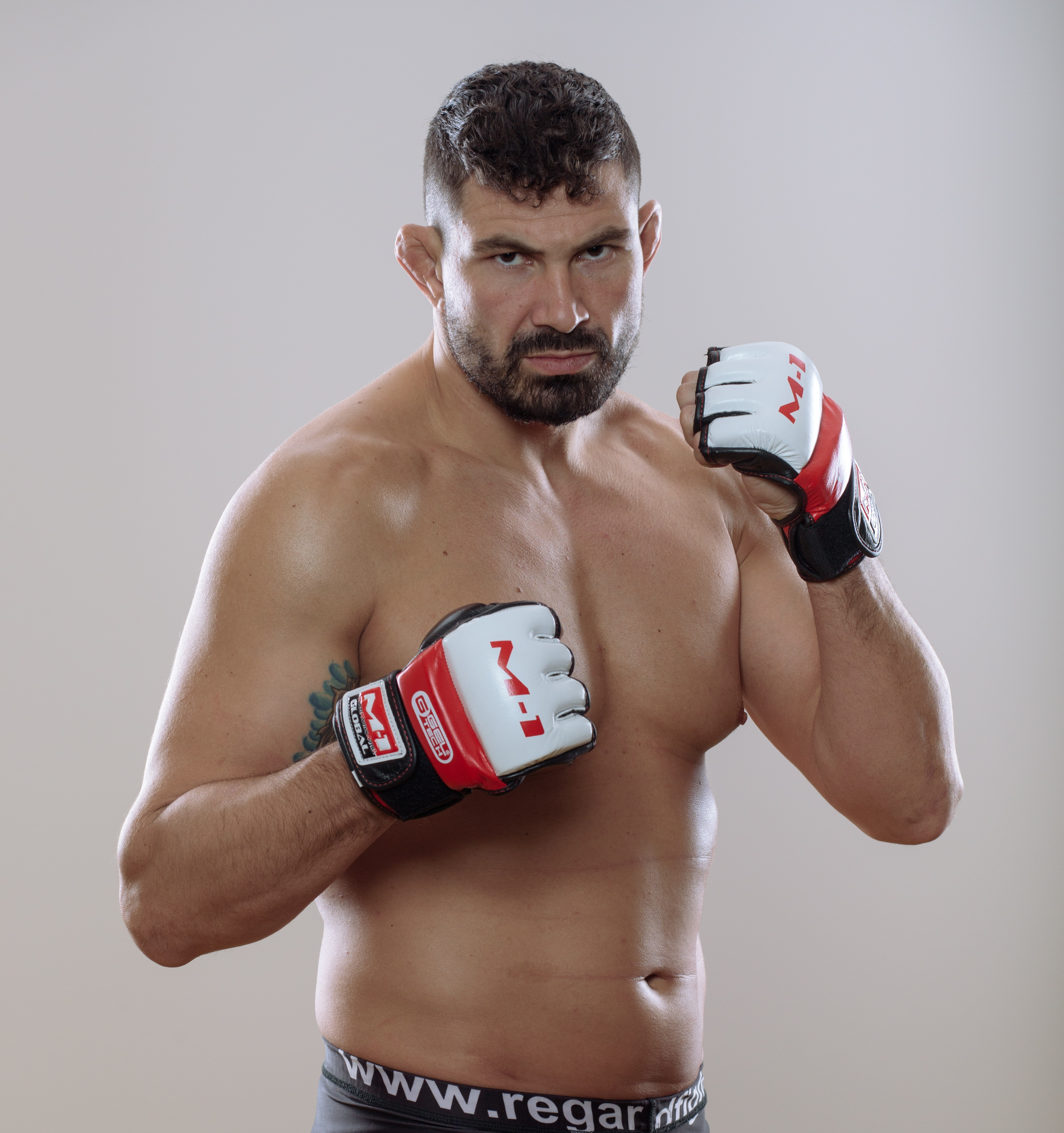
- Attila Végh
- Born: August 9, 1985 (age 41); Dunajská Streda, Czechoslovakia (now Slovakia)
- Other names: Pumukli
- Nationality: Slovak
- Height: 6 ft 2 in (1.88 m)
- Weight: 205 lb (93 kg; 14.6 st)
- Division: Heavyweight; Light Heavyweight
- Reach: 77 in (200 cm)
- Stance: Orthodox
- Fighting out of: Bratislava, Slovakia; Coconut Creek, Florida
- Team: Octagon Fighting Academy; American Top Team
- Rank: Second degree black belt in Kempo Karate; Purple belt in Brazilian Jiu-Jitsu
- Years active: 2008–present

Mixed martial arts record
- Total: 46
- Wins: 33
- By knockout: 14
- By submission: 9
- By decision: 10
- Losses: 11
- By knockout: 3
- By submission: 2
- By decision: 6
- Draws: 2

Other information
- Mixed martial arts record from Sherdog
- www.scorpionteam.com

Attila Végh (born August 9, 1985) is a Slovak mixed martial artist who competed in the Light Heavyweight divisions of Bellator Fighting Championships and Konfrontacja Sztuk Walki (KSW). He won the Bellator 2012 Summer Series Light Heavyweight Tournament and then the Bellator Light Heavyweight Championship. After losing it in his first defense, he was released from the promotion. A professional competitor since 2008, he has also competed for M-1 Global. Now coach of UFC fighters Ľudovít Klein and Martin Buday in Spartakus Fight Gym, Trnava.

== Early life ==
Végh was born on August 9, 1985, in Dunajská Streda, Slovakia. Growing up in Gabčíkovo he started wrestling at the age of 5 up until the age of 16 when he switched to Kempo Karate. He became a successful Kempo Karate practitioner and won a number of titles including one world title, one European title and won the Hungarian kempo karate championships in his division 14 times.

== Mixed martial arts career ==
=== Early career ===
Végh made his professional MMA debut in Slovakia in March 2008. For the first year of his career, he was undefeated with a record of 9 wins and no losses.

In May 2009, Végh debuted for the KSW promotion in Poland and encountered his first professional loss by decision to Lukasz Jurkowski. In February 2010, Végh had the most important bout in his life when he faced Aleksander Radosavljevic in the title match of Noc Skorpiona 6 (an MMA tournament held in Karlovac, Croatia), where he won by split decision in Round 3. This made him become European MMA champion under World Free Fight Association. This was the main reason why he got a contract with Bellator through his manager Zvonimir Brala later on.

Over the next three years, Végh continued fighting for various promotions all over Central Europe. Following the loss to Jurkowski, he added to his record with 15 more wins, 3 losses, and 2 draws. Notable wins include highly touted Marcus Vanttinen and Jonas Billstein.

=== Bellator Fighting Championships ===
In late 2011, it was announced that Végh had been signed by Bellator MMA to fight in their Light Heavyweight division.

Végh made his Bellator debut in April 2012. He defeated Dan Spohn via split decision at Bellator 66.

In the summer of 2012, Végh entered Bellator's Light Heavyweight tournament. In the opening round at Bellator 71, he faced Zelg Galesic and won via submission a minute into the first round. Végh faced Emanuel Newton in the semifinals at Bellator 72. He won the fight via controversial split decision. He faced Travis Wiuff in the tournament finals at Bellator 73 on August 24, 2012. Végh won in impressive fashion, getting a KO victory just 25 seconds into the first round. With the win, he earned the chance to face Bellator Light Heavyweight World Champion Christian M'Pumbu at Bellator 91 on February 28, 2013. He won the Bellator Light Heavyweight Championship belt via unanimous decision.

Végh was expected to face Emanuel Newton in a rematch at Bellator 106, but pulled out of the bout and was replaced by Muhammed Lawal.

Végh faced Interim Bellator Light Heavyweight champion Emanuel Newton in a title unification bout at Bellator 113 on March 21, 2014. He lost the fight via split decision.

On August 25, 2014, Végh was released from Bellator, along with twelve other fighters.

=== M-1 Global ===
Over the years, Végh has experienced a mixture of victories and defeats in his MMA career. After a unanimous decision loss to Viktor Nemkov at M-1 Challenge 71. Végh rebounded with several impressive wins. He secured a unanimous decision victory against Paul Byrne at Oktagon 3: Open Air in July 2017, followed by a submission win via arm-triangle choke over Travis Fulton at Oktagon 4: Challenge Finals 2 in November of the same year. Végh continued his success in 2018 with a unanimous decision win over Maiquel Falcão at Oktagon 10 in Prague. However, in June 2019, he faced a setback when Virgil Zwicker knocked him out at Oktagon 12 in Bratislava. Végh bounced back in November 2019, scoring a knockout victory over Karlos Vémola at Oktagon 15. 5 years later, Végh and Vemola rematched, this time with Végh suffering a submission loss via arm-triangle choke to Karlos Vemola in a rematch for the Oktagon Light Heavyweight Championship at Oktagon 58 in June 2024.

== Championships and accomplishments ==
- Bellator Fighting Championships
  - Bellator Light Heavyweight Championship (One time)
  - Bellator 2012 Summer Series Light Heavyweight Tournament Winner

== Mixed martial arts record ==
Professional record breakdown
46 matches	33 wins	11 losses
By knockout	14	3
By submission	9	2
By decision	10	6
Draws	2	

Res.	Record	Opponent	Method	Event	Date	Round	Time	Location	Notes
Loss	33–11–2	Karlos Vémola	Decision (unanimous)	Oktagon 72	June 14, 2025	5	5:00	Prague, Czech Republic	For the symbolic "Infinity" title.
Loss	33–10–2	Karlos Vemola	Submission (arm-triangle choke)	Oktagon 58	June 8, 2024	2	0:45	Prague, Czech Republic	For the Oktagon Light Heavyweight Championship.
Win	33–9–2	Karlos Vemola	KO (punch)	Oktagon 15	November 9, 2019	1	2:07	Prague, Czech Republic	
Loss	32–9–2	Virgil Zwicker	KO (punches)	Oktagon 12	June 8, 2019	1	3:18	Bratislava, Slovakia	
Win	32–8–2	Maiquel Falcão	Decision (unanimous)	Oktagon 10	November 17, 2018	3	5:00	Prague, Czech Republic	
Win	31–8–2	Travis Fulton	Submission (arm-triangle choke)	Oktagon 4: Challenge Finals 2	November 12, 2017	1	3:23	Bratislava, Slovakia	
Win	30–8–2	Paul Byrne	Decision (unanimous)	Oktagon 3: Open Air	July 29, 2017	3	5:00	Prague, Czech Republic	
Loss	29–8–2	Viktor Nemkov	Decision (unanimous)	M-1 Challenge 71: Nemkov vs. Vegh	October 21, 2016	3	5:00	St. Petersburg, Russia	Return to Light Heavyweight.
Loss	29–7–2	Alexander Volkov	KO (punches)	M-1 Challenge 68: Shlemenko vs. Vasilevsky 2	June 16, 2016	1	2:38	Moscow, Russia	For the M-1 Global Heavyweight Championship.
Loss	29–6–2	Goran Reljić	Decision (split)	KSW 31	May 23, 2015	3	5:00	Gdańsk, Poland	For the vacant KSW Light Heavyweight Championship.
Loss	29–5–2	Emanuel Newton	Decision (split)	Bellator 113	March 21, 2014	5	5:00	Mulvane, Kansas, United States	Lost the Bellator Light Heavyweight World Championship.
Win	29–4–2	Christian M'Pumbu	Decision (unanimous)	Bellator 91	February 28, 2013	5	5:00	Rio Rancho, New Mexico, United States	Won the Bellator Light Heavyweight World Championship.
Win	28–4–2	Travis Wiuff	KO (punches)	Bellator 73	August 24, 2012	1	0:25	Tunica, Mississippi, United States	Bellator 2012 Light Heavyweight Tournament Final.
Win	27–4–2	Emanuel Newton	Decision (split)	Bellator 72	July 20, 2012	3	5:00	Tampa, Florida, United States	Bellator 2012 Light Heavyweight Tournament Semifinal.
Win	26–4–2	Zelg Galešić	Submission (rear naked choke)	Bellator 71	June 22, 2012	1	1:00	Chester, West Virginia, United States	Bellator 2012 Light Heavyweight Tournament Quarterfinal.
Win	25–4–2	Dan Spohn	Decision (split)	Bellator 66	April 20, 2012	3	5:00	Cleveland, Ohio, United States	
Win	24–4–2	Jonas Billstein	Submission (triangle choke)	Heroes Gate 4	June 23, 2011	3	N/A	Prague, Czech Republic	Return to Light Heavyweight.
Win	23–4–2	Grigor Aschugbabjan	TKO (retirement)	KSW 16	May 21, 2011	2	0:26	Gdańsk, Poland	Catchweight (207 lbs) bout.
Win	22–4–2	Marcus Vänttinen	Decision (unanimous)	Rock and Brawl	May 14, 2011	3	5:00	Kouvola, Finland	
Win	21–4–2	Baga Agaev	TKO (corner stoppage)	Heroes Gate 3	March 24, 2011	3	N/A	Prague, Czech Republic	
Draw	20–4–2	Hans Stringer	Draw (unanimous)	Nitrianska Noc Bojovnikov III: Ring of Honor	February 5, 2011	2	5:00	Nitra, Slovakia	
Loss	20–4–1	Simon Carlsen	TKO (punches)	Heroes Gate 2	October 21, 2010	2	2:40	Prague, Czech Republic	
Win	20–3–1	Jevgenij Lapin	Submission (triangle-armbar)	Nitrianska Noc Bojovnikov: Ring of Honor	June 3, 2010	1	4:33	Nitra, Slovakia	
Win	19–3–1	Egidijus Valavičius	Decision (unanimous)	Heroes Gate 1	May 29, 2010	2	5:00	Prague, Czech Republic	
Draw	18–3–1	Adlan Amagov	Draw (unanimous)	Azerbaijan Pankration Federation: Azerbaijan vs. Europe	May 22, 2010	3	5:00	Baku, Azerbaijan	
Loss	18–3	Daniel Tabera	Submission (kneebar)	KSW 13	May 7, 2010	1	4:57	Katowice, Poland	KSW Light Heavyweight Tournament Semifinal.
Win	18–2	Łukasz Skibski	TKO (knees)	KSW 13	May 7, 2010	1	4:53	Katowice, Poland	KSW Light Heavyweight Tournament Quarterfinal.
Win	17–2	Kristof Nataska	KO (soccer kicks)	KO Boxing Club Galanta: ODPLATA	April 17, 2010	1	N/A	Šaľa, Slovakia	
Win	16–2	Boris Tonkovic	TKO (punches)	Den Gladiatora 7	March 26, 2010	1	0:50	Bratislava, Slovakia	
Win	15–2	Aleksandar Radosavljevic	Decision (unanimous)	Noc Skorpiona 6	February 13, 2010	3	5:00	Karlovac, Croatia	
Win	14–2	Igor Henc	TKO (punches)	Total FC: TotalFight	December 12, 2009	1	3:30	Hungary	
Loss	13–2	Toni Valtonen	Decision (split)	Shooto Finland: Helsinki Fight Night	November 28, 2009	3	5:00	Helsinki, Finland	
Win	13–1	Arnoldas Joknys	TKO (submission to punches)	Noc Bojov 1	October 31, 2009	1	1:11	Nitra, Slovakia	
Win	12–1	Aslambek Saidov	Submission (triangle-armbar)	Kings of the Ring: Return of Gladiators	October 16, 2009	2	2:23	Brno, Czech Republic	
Win	11–1	Lubos Suda	Submission (armbar)	Hell Cage 4	September 20, 2009	1	1:30	Prague, Czech Republic	
Win	10–1	Gustav Dietz	TKO (punches)	It's Showtime: Budapest	August 29, 2009	1	1:13	Budapest, Hungary	
Loss	9–1	Lukasz Jurkowski	Decision (unanimous)	KSW 11	May 15, 2009	2	5:00	Warsaw, Poland	
Win	9–0	Sebastian Hercun	TKO (submission to punches)	Fight Stage Championship 3	April 30, 2009	1	2:41	Košice, Slovakia	
Win	8–0	Markus Wagner	Submission (arm-triangle choke)	Free Fight Championship: On Tour	April 25, 2009	1	1:33	Jena, Germany	
Win	7–0	Lukas Turecek	KO (punches)	Hell Cage 3	March 29, 2009	1	0:12	Prague, Czech Republic	
Win	6–0	Zsolt Zathureczky	Decision (unanimous)	Vendetta	March 15, 2009	2	5:00	Csongrád, Hungary	
Win	5–0	Markus Di Gallo	Decision (unanimous)	Fight Stage Championship 2	November 10, 2008	3	5:00	Bratislava, Slovakia	
Win	4–0	Martin Wojcik	Submission (armbar)	Hell Cage 2	October 19, 2008	2	4:29	Prague, Czech Republic	
Win	3–0	Matyas Levante	TKO (punches)	Total FC: TotalFight	August 20, 2008	1	0:55	Pest, Hungary	
Win	2–0	Matej Turcan	TKO (submission to punches)	Fight Stage Championship 1	June 2, 2008	2	1:46	Košice, Slovakia	
Win	1–0	Matej Turcan	Submission (armbar)	Top X-Fight 2: In the Middle of Nowhere	March 29, 2008	1	4:35	Žilina, Slovakia	
