= 2010 in Konfrontacja Sztuk Walki =

Mixed martial arts events

Information
- First date: May 7, 2010
- Last date: October 9, 2010

Events
- Total events: 4

Fights
- Total fights: 26
- Title fights: 2

Chronology
2009 in KSW	2010 in Konfrontacja Sztuk Walki	2011 in KSW

The year 2010 was the seventh year in the history of the Konfrontacja Sztuk Walki, a mixed martial arts promotion based in Poland. In 2010 Konfrontacja Sztuk Walki held 4 events beginning with, KSW: KSW Elimination.

== List of events ==
#	Event Title	Date	Arena	Location
1	KSW Elimination 3	April 1, 2010	CWKS Legia Boxing Club	Warsaw, Poland
2	KSW 13: Kumite	May 7, 2010	Spodek	Katowice, Poland
3	KSW 14: Judgment Day	September 18, 2010	Atlas Arena	Łódź, Poland
4	KSW Fight Club	October 9, 2010	Ryn Castle	Ryn, Poland

== Title fights ==
Title fights in 2010
#	Weight Class				Method	Round	Time	Event	Notes
1	Lightheavyweight 93 kg	(Poland) Mamed Khalidov (c)	draw	(Japan) Ryuta Sakurai	Decision (unanimous)	3	5:00	KSW 13: Kumite	For the KSW Light Heavyweight Championship.
2	Middleweight 84 kg	(Poland) Krzysztof Kulak	def.	(Brazil) Vitor Nóbrega	Decision (unanimous)	3	5:00	KSW 13: Kumite	For the Vacant KSW Middleweight Championship.

== KSW Elimination 3 ==
KSW Elimination 3
- Promotion: Konfrontacja Sztuk Walki
- Date: April 1, 2010
- Venue: CWKS Legia Boxing Club
- City: Warsaw, Poland

Event chronology
KSW 12	KSW Elimination 3	KSW 13

KSW: KSW Elimination was a mixed martial arts event held on April 1, 2010, at the CWKS Legia Boxing Club in Warsaw, Poland.

=== Results ===
Fight Card
Weight Class				Method	Round	Notes
Light Heavyweight 93 kg	(Poland) Lukasz Skibski	def.	(Poland) Tomasz Molski	Decision (Unanimous)	2

== KSW 13: Kumite ==
KSW 13: Kumite
- Promotion: Konfrontacja Sztuk Walki
- Date: May 7, 2010
- Venue: Spodek
- City: Katowice, Poland

Event chronology
KSW Elimination	KSW 13: Kumite	KSW 14

KSW 13: Kumite was a mixed martial arts event held on May 7, 2010, at Spodek in Katowice, Poland.

=== Results ===
Fight Card
Weight Class				Method	Round	Notes
Light Heavyweight 93 kg	(Poland) Mamed Khalidov (c)	def.	(Japan) Ryuta Sakurai	Draw	4	For the KSW Light Heavyweight Championship.
Heavyweight 120 kg	(Poland) Mariusz Pudzianowski	def.	(Japan) Yusuke Kawaguchi	Decision (Unanimous)	2
Light Heavyweight 93 kg	(Poland) Jan Błachowicz	def.	(Poland) Wojciech Orłowski	Submission (Rear-Naked Choke)	1	Light Heavyweight Tournament Semi-Finals 2
Light Heavyweight 93 kg	(Spain) Daniel Tabera	def.	(Slovakia) Attila Végh	Submission (Kneebar)	1	Light Heavyweight Tournament Semi-Finals 1
Middleweight 84 kg	(Poland) Krzysztof Kulak (c)	def.	(Brazil) Vitor Nobrega	Decision (Unanimous)	3	For the Vacant KSW Middleweight Championship.
Heavyweight 120 kg	(United States) David Oliva	def.	(Latvia) Konstantin Gluhov	Decision (Unanimous)	3	Heavyweight Tournament Final
Light Heavyweight 93 kg	(Poland) Jan Błachowicz	def.	(Brazil) Julio Cezar de Lima	KO (Punch)	1	Light Heavyweight Tournament Quarter-Finals 4
Light Heavyweight 93 kg	(Poland) Wojciech Orłowski	def.	(Poland) Tomasz Molski	TKO (Punches)	1	Light Heavyweight Tournament Quarter-Finals 3
Light Heavyweight 93 kg	(Slovakia) Attila Végh	def.	(Poland) Lukasz Skibski	TKO (Punches)	1	Light Heavyweight Tournament Quarter-Finals 2
Light Heavyweight 93 kg	(Spain) Daniel Tabera	def.	(Armenia) Grigor Ashughbabyan	Decision (Majority)	2	Light Heavyweight Tournament Quarter-Finals 1

=== KSW 13 Tournament Bracket ===
Quarter-Finals; KSW 13
(Spain) Daniel Tabera	MD
(Armenia) Grigor Ashughbabyan	2r.
(Slovakia) Attila Végh	TKO
(Poland) Lukasz Skibski	1r.
(Poland) Wojciech Orłowski	TKO
(Poland) Tomasz Molski	1r.
(Poland) Jan Błachowicz	TKO
(Brazil) Julio Cezar de Lima	1r.

Semi-Finals; KSW 13
(Spain) Daniel Tabera	SUB
(Slovakia) Attila Végh	1r.
(Poland) Wojciech Orłowski	1r.
(Poland) Jan Błachowicz	SUB

Finals; KSW 14
(Spain) Daniel Tabera	2r.
(Poland) Jan Błachowicz	TKO

== KSW 14: Judgment Day ==
KSW 14: Judgment Day
- Promotion: Konfrontacja Sztuk Walki
- Date: September 18, 2010
- Venue: Atlas Arena
- City: Łódź, Poland

Event chronology
KSW 13	KSW 14: Judgment Day	KSW Fight Club

KSW 14: Judgment Day was a mixed martial arts event held on September 18, 2010, at the Atlas Arena in Łódź, Poland.

=== Results ===
Fight Card
Weight Class				Method	Round	Notes
Heavyweight 120 kg	(Poland) Mariusz Pudzianowski	def.	(United States) Eric "Butterbean" Esch	TKO (Submission to punches)	1
Light Heavyweight 93 kg	(Poland) Jan Błachowicz	def.	(Spain) Daniel Tabera	TKO (Corner Stoppage)	2	Light Heavyweight Tournament Final
Middleweight 84 kg	(Poland) Krzysztof Kulak	def.	(Poland) Daniel Dowda	Decision (Unanimous - Extra Round)	3
Lightweight 70 kg	(Finland) Niko Puhakka	def.	(Netherlands) Danny van Bergen	Decision (Unanimous)	2	Lightweight Tournament Semi-Finals 2
Lightweight 70 kg	(Poland) Maciej Gorski	def.	(Poland) Michal Mankiewicz	Decision (Unanimous)	2	Lightweight Tournament Semi-Finals 1
Heavyweight 120 kg	(Poland) Przemyslaw Saleta	def.	(Poland) Marcin Najman	Submission (Forearm Choke)	1
Lightweight 70 kg	(Finland) Niko Puhakka	def.	(Poland) Borys Mankowski	Submission (Anaconda Choke)	2	Lightweight Tournament Quarter-Finals 4
Lightweight 70 kg	(Netherlands) Danny van Bergen	def.	(Poland) Artur Sowiński	Decision (Unanimous - Extra Round)	3	Lightweight Tournament Quarter-Finals 3
Lightweight 70 kg	(Poland) Maciej Gorski	def.	(Japan) Kazuki Tokudome	TKO (Head Kick and Punch)	1	Lightweight Tournament Quarter-Finals 2
Lightweight 70 kg	(Poland) Michal Mankiewicz	def.	(Scotland) Paul Reed	Decision (Majority)	2	Lightweight Tournament Quarter-Finals 1

=== KSW Tournament Bracket ===
Quarter-Finals; KSW 14
(Poland) Michal Mankiewicz	MD
(Scotland) Paul Reed	2r.
(Poland) Maciej Gorski	TKO
(Japan) Kazuki Tokudome	1r.
(Netherlands) Danny van Bergen	UD
(Poland) Artur Sowiński	3r.
(Finland) Niko Puhakka	SUB
(Poland) Borys Mankowski	2r.

Semi-Finals; KSW 14
(Poland) Michal Mankiewicz	2r.
(Poland) Maciej Gorski	UD
(Netherlands) Danny van Bergen	2r.
(Finland) Niko Puhakka	UD

Finals; KSW 15
(Poland) Maciej Gorski	2r.
(Finland) Niko Puhakka	SUB

== KSW Fight Club ==
KSW Fight Club
- Promotion: Konfrontacja Sztuk Walki
- Date: October 9, 2010
- Venue: Ryn Castle
- City: Ryn, Poland

Event chronology
KSW 14	KSW Fight Club	KSW Extra 2

KSW Fight Club was a mixed martial arts event held on October 9, 2010, at the Ryn Castle in Ryn, Poland.

=== Results ===
Fight Card
Weight Class				Method	Round	Notes
Light Heavyweight 93 kg	(Poland) Antoni Chmielewski	def.	(France) Gregory Babene	Decision (Unanimous)	2
Light Heavyweight 93 kg	(Italy) Matteo Minonzio	def.	(Poland) Wojciech Orłowski	TKO (Punches)	2
Light Heavyweight 93 kg	(Armenia) Grigor Ashughbabyan	def.	(Poland) Lukasz Dzialowy	Decision (Unanimous)	2
Welterweight 77 kg	(Russia) Aslambek Saidov	def.	(Poland) Pawel Zydak	KO (Punches)	1
Heavyweight 120 kg	(Russia) Dmitry Zabolotny	def.	(Poland) Marcin Bartkiewicz	Submission (Rear-Naked Choke)	1

== See also ==
- Konfrontacja Sztuk Walki
