= Arlowski =

Arlowski, Arlovski, Arloŭski (Belarusian: Арлоўскі) are transliterations of the Belarusian surname equivalent to Polish Orlowski. Notable people with the surname include:

- Andrei Arlovski (born 1979), Belarusian mixed martial artist
- Lyudmila Arlouskaya married name of Lyudmila Lysenko (biathlete), Belarusian biathlete
- Radzislaw Arlowski (born 1970), Belarusian footballer
