= 2009 in Konfrontacja Sztuk Walki =

Mixed martial arts events

Information
- First date: May 15, 2009
- Last date: December 2009

Events
- Total events: 2

Fights
- Total fights: 18
- Title fights: 1

Chronology
2008 in KSW	2009 in Konfrontacja Sztuk Walki	2010 in KSW

The year 2009 was the sixth year in the history of the Konfrontacja Sztuk Walki, a mixed martial arts promotion based in Poland. In 2009 Konfrontacja Sztuk Walki held 2 events beginning with, KSW 11: Khalidov vs. Acacio.

== List of events ==
#	Event Title	Date	Arena	Location
1	KSW 11: Khalidov vs. Acacio	May 15, 2009	Hala Torwar	Warsaw, Poland
2	KSW 12: Pudzianowski vs. Najman	December 11, 2009	Hala Torwar	Warsaw, Poland

== Title fights ==
Title fights in 2009
#	Weight Class				Method	Round	Time	Event	Notes
1	Lightheavyweight 93 kg	(Poland) Mamed Khalidov	def.	(Brazil) Daniel Acacio	Decision (unanimous)	1	1:10	KSW 11: Khalidov vs. Acacio	For the KSW Light Heavyweight Championship.

== KSW 11: Khalidov vs. Acacio ==
KSW 11: Khalidov vs. Acacio
- Promotion: Konfrontacja Sztuk Walki
- Date: May 15, 2009
- Venue: Hala Torwar
- City: Warsaw, Poland

Event chronology
KSW 10	KSW 11: Khalidov vs. Acacio	KSW 12

KSW 11: Khalidov vs. Acacio was a mixed martial arts event held on May 15, 2009, at the Hala Torwar in Warsaw, Poland.

=== Results ===
Fight Card
Weight Class				Method	Round	Notes
Middleweight 84 kg	(Russia) Aslambek Saidov	def.	(Poland) Lukasz Christ	Submission (Armbar)	1	Middleweight Tournament Semi-Finals 2
Middleweight 84 kg	(Brazil) Vitor Nobrega	def.	(Poland) Artur Kadlubek	Submission (Arm-Triangle Choke)	1	Middleweight Tournament Semi-Finals 1
Light Heavyweight 93 kg	(Poland) Mamed Khalidov (c)	def.	(Brazil) Daniel Acacio	KO (Punches)	1	For the Inaugural KSW Light Heavyweight Championship.
Light Heavyweight 93 kg	(Poland) Antoni Chmielewski	def.	(Netherlands) Michael Knaap	Decision (Unanimous)	2
Heavyweight 120 kg	(Poland) Lukasz Jurkowski	def.	(Slovakia) Attila Végh	Decision (Unanimous)	2
Middleweight 84 kg	(Poland) Krzysztof Sadecki	def.	(Czech Republic) Andre Reinders	Decision (Unanimous)	3	Middleweight Tournament Quarter-Finals 4
Middleweight 84 kg	(Russia) Aslambek Saidov	def.	(Italy) Michele Verginelli	Decision (Unanimous)	2	Middleweight Tournament Quarter-Finals 3
Middleweight 84 kg	(Poland) Artur Kadłubek	def.	(Russia) Sergei Nikitin	Decision (Unanimous)	2	Middleweight Tournament Quarter-Finals 2
Middleweight 84 kg	(Brazil) Vitor Nobrega	def.	(Poland) Lukasz Christ	Submission (Arm-Triangle Choke)	1	Middleweight Tournament Quarter-Finals 1

=== KSW 11 Tournament Bracket ===
Quarter-Finals; KSW 11
(Brazil) Vitor Nóbrega	SUB
(Poland) Łukasz Christ	1r.
(Poland) Artur Kadłubek	UD
(Russia) Sergei Nikitin	2r.
(Poland) Aslambek Saidov	UD
(Italy) Michele Verginelli	2r.
(Poland) Krzysztof Sadecki	UD
(Czech Republic) Andre Reinders	2r.

Semi-Finals; KSW 11
(Brazil) Vitor Nóbrega	SUB
(Poland) Artur Kadłubek	1r.
(Poland) Aslambek Saidov	SUB
(Poland) Łukasz Christ	1r.

Finals; KSW 12
(Brazil) Vitor Nóbrega	SD
(Poland) Aslambek Saidov	4r.

== KSW 12: Pudzianowski vs. Najman ==
KSW 12: Pudzianowski vs. Najman
- Promotion: Konfrontacja Sztuk Walki
- Date: December 11, 2009
- Venue: Hala Torwar
- City: Warsaw, Poland
- Attendance: 6000

Event chronology
KSW 11	KSW 12: Pudzianowski vs. Najman	KSW Elimination

KSW 12: Pudzianowski vs. Najman was a mixed martial arts event held on December 11, 2009, at the Hala Torwar in Warsaw, Poland.

=== Results ===
Fight Card
Weight Class				Method	Round	Notes
Middleweight 84 kg	(Brazil) Vitor Nóbrega	def.	(Russia) Aslambek Saidov	Decision (Split - Extra Round)	4	Middleweight Tournament Final
Lightweight 70 kg	(England) Dean Amasinger	def.	(Poland) Maciej Gorski	Submission (Guillotine Choke)	1
Heavyweight 120 kg	(Poland) Mariusz Pudzianowski	def.	(Poland) Marcin Najman	TKO (Submission to punches)	1
Heavyweight 120 kg	(United States) David Oliva	def.	(Poland) Daniel Omielanczuk	Decision (Unanimous)	2	Heavyweight Tournament Semi-Finals 1
Middleweight 84 kg	(England) James Zikic	def.	(Poland) Daniel Dowda	Decision (Unanimous)	2
Heavyweight 120 kg	(Latvia) Konstantin Gluhov	def.	(Poland) Daniel Omielanczuk	Decision (Majority)	2	Heavyweight Tournament Quarter-Finals 4
Heavyweight 120 kg	(Poland) Karol Bedorf	def.	(Lithuania) Arunas Vilius	Submission (Kimura)	2	Heavyweight Tournament Quarter-Finals 3
Heavyweight 120 kg	(United States) David Oliva	def.	(Poland) Wojciech Orlowski	TKO (Submission to punches)	1	Heavyweight Tournament Quarter-Finals 2
Heavyweight 120 kg	(Poland) Dawid Baziak	def.	(Russia) Maxim Grishin	Decision (Unanimous - Extra Round)	3	Heavyweight Tournament Quarter-Finals 1

=== KSW 12 Tournament Bracket ===
Quarter-Finals; KSW 12
(Poland) Dawid Baziak	UD
(Russia) Maxim Grishin	3r.
(United States) David Oliva	SUB
(Poland) Wojciech Orlowski	1r.
(Poland) Karol Bedorf	SUB
(Lithuania) Arunas Vilius	2r.
(Latvia) Konstantin Glukhov	MD
(Poland) Daniel Omielanczuk	2r.

Semi-Finals; KSW 12
(United States) David Oliva	UD
(Poland) Daniel Omielanczuk	2r.
(Latvia) Konstantin Glukhov
BYE

Finals; KSW 13
(United States) David Oliva	UD
(Latvia) Konstantin Glukhov	3r.

== See also ==
- Konfrontacja Sztuk Walki
