= Konstantin Gluhov =

Latvian kickboxer and MMA fighter

- Born: Konstantin Gluhov; January 17, 1980 (age 46); Riga, Latvia
- Native name: Константин Игоревич Глухов
- Other names: Lāčplēsis (Bear-slayer)
- Nationality: Russian
- Height: 1.88 m (6 ft 2 in)
- Weight: 108 kg (238 lb; 17.0 st)
- Division: Heavyweight
- Style: Kickboxing, karate
- Fighting out of: Moscow, Russia
- Team: Alfa Gym (2001–present); SK "Fair Fighting" (1996–2001)
- Trainer: ---
- Years active: 2000–present (kickboxing); 2006–present (MMA)

Kickboxing record
- Total: 82
- Wins: 56
- By knockout: 34
- Losses: 25
- By knockout: 5
- Draws: 1

Mixed martial arts record
- Total: 52
- Wins: 35
- By knockout: 26
- By submission: 3
- By decision: 6
- Losses: 17
- By knockout: 4
- By submission: 4
- By decision: 8
- By disqualification: 1

Other information
- Mixed martial arts record from Sherdog
- Last updated on: September 22, 2021

Konstantin Gluhov (Russian: Константин Игоревич Глухов, Latvian: Konstantīns Gluhovs; born January 17, 1980) is a Latvian heavyweight kickboxer and mixed martial artist of Russian descent.

In Muay Thai, he won the WPKA World Muaythai champion, in Kickboxing, he competed in K-1 and competed successfully. In Mixed martial arts, A European heavyweight fighter and one of the leading heavyweight fighters in Latvia.

Aside from MMA and kickboxing, Gluhov is also a karate black belt.

== Biography and career ==
Gluhov started karate and hand-to-hand fighting in 1996 at the Fair Fighting club with coaches Saulius Sheikis and Vasily Fleisher. But just a couple of months later, the club shifted to kickboxing. In the same year, 1996, Kostya wins his first title with his teammate Alexei Kharchuk - Latvian kickboxing champion (youth). In the amateur ring, Glukhov won the world championships in Thai boxing, Kickboxing and Kick-jitsu. In 2000, after 60 amateur fights, Konstantin became a professional.

In 2006 and 2008, Gluhov as part of the Latvian national team won the world championship in universal combat (unifight). And in 2009, he became Europe Champion (unifight).

He made his K-1 debut in 2006 at K-1 Fighting Network Riga 2006 against Denis Sobolyev.

In 2007, in Sochi, Gluhov lost for WBKF world championship belt to Alexei Kudin from Belarus

On November 22, 2008, Gluhov won the K-1 World Grand Prix 2008 in Riga tournament by three consecutive knockouts over Marco Della Ricca, Pacome Assi and Mindaugas Sakalauskas.

March 26, 2009 in Moscow hosted a kickboxing world championship tournament, which was attended by Pavel Zhuravlev, Alexei Kudin, Konstantin Gluhov and Elvin Abbasov. Gluhov lost in the finals to Zhuravlev

In 2010 Gluhov won the K-1 Grand Prix selection tournament defeating Vitaly Shemetov in the final.

Gluhov's debut in MMA took place in 2006 in Finland. Konstantin won his first fight by TKO in the first round over Atte Backman, Finland.

At the KSW XII 8-men tournament Konstantin won the quarterfinal of the Pole Daniel Omielanczuk, but in the tournament finals, already at KSW XIII, he lost to the American David Olivia.

In December 2010, Gluhov took part in the Ultimate Cage Fighters Championship 16-men tournament, held in Vienna. Having won 4 early victories, including over Serb Miodrag Petkovic, whom Gluhov lost in previous competitions, Konstantin won the UCFC belt.

== Championships and accomplishments ==
=== Kickboxing ===
- 2010 K-1 World Grand Prix Selection champion
- 2009 WBKF World Tournament (+93 kg) runner up
- 2008 Warrior's Honor Tournament Champion
- 2008 K-1 World Grand Prix 2008 in Riga champion
- 2006 Masters Fight Night tournament finalist
- 2006 WBKF Europe Tournament (+93 kg) runner up
- 2005 WBKF Europe Tournament (+93 kg) runner up
- 2005 2nd Draka European championships (+90 kg) champion
- 2004 1st Draka European championships (+90 kg) champion
- 2002 WPKA World Heavyweight champion
- 2002 WPKA Heavyweight Champion of Asia
- 2002 WPKA Baltic States Heavyweight Champion
- 2000 IKF European champion

=== Boxing ===
- 2012 Bigger's Better 12 elimination tournament winner, Lithuania, 2012

=== Mixed martial arts ===
- HIT Fighting Championship
  - HIT FC Heavyweight Champion
- International League MMA
  - Oleg Taktarov Cup Tournament winner
- Konfrontacja Sztuk Walki
  - KSW Heavyweight Tournament second place
- M-1 Global
  - 2013 M-1 Global Heavyweight Grand Prix second place
- Pancrase Fighting Championship
  - PFC Heavyweight Championship (2 times, current)
  - PFC 3 Tournament winner
- Russian MMA Championship
  - Russian MMA Championship Tournament second place
- Ultimate Cage Fighting Championship
  - 2010 UCFC 20,000 Euro Tournament winner
  - 2009 UCFC 20,000 Dollar Tournament runner up
- Warrior's Honor
  - Warrior's Honor Superfight winner
  - Warrior's Honor 3 Tournament winner
- Kick-Jitsu
  - 2005 World Champion kick-jitsu (+91 kg)
- UNIFIGHT
  - 2009 "Universal Fight" Europe Championships (+95 kg) champion
  - 2009 Xth "Universal Fight" World Championships (+95 kg) vice-champion
  - 2008 IXth "Universal Fight" World Championships (+95 kg) champion
  - 2006 VIIth "Universal Fight" World Championships (+95 kg) champion
- WFCA
  - 2008 WFCA European Heavyweight (+96 kg) MMA champion

== Kickboxing record ==
Kickboxing record
82 fights, 55 wins (34 (T)KOs, 21 decisions), 26 losses, 1 draw
Date	Result	Opponent	Event	Location	Method	Round	Time
2024-04-28	Loss	(Russia) Vladimir Mineev	FKR PRO 9	Ulyanovsk, Russia	Decision (unanimous)	5	3:00
2024-02-22	Loss	(Russia) Alexei Stoyan	FKR PRO 8	Sochi, Russia	Ext R. decision (unanimous)	4	3:00
2021-09-22	Loss	(Romania) Ștefan Lătescu	Dynamite Fighting Show 12	Baia Mare, Romania	Decision (unanimous)	3	3:00
2021-06-04	Loss	(Romania) Ionuț Iancu	Dynamite Fighting Show 11	Bucharest, Romania	Ext R. decision (unanimous)	4	3:00
2020-03-01	Win	(Thailand) Khundech	Muai Thai fight	Phuket, Thailand	КО	2	0:57
2018-09-06	Loss	(Netherlands) Eldar Oliveira Garcia	TNA	Kazan, Russia	Decision (unanimous)	4	3:00
2018-06-27	Win	(Moldova) Maxim Bolotov	TNA	Kazan, Russia	КО	4	0:58
2018-05-12	Loss	(China) Ye Xiang	Sanda Prime Ligue	Shanghai, China	Decision (unanimous)	3	3:00
2018-04-01	Win	(Czech Republic) Davit	Muai Thai fight	Phuket, Thailand	КО	3	0:22
2017-12-07	Loss	(Ukraine) Tsotne Rogava	Kung Fu Kings	Hebei, China	КО	1	0:33
2015-12-26	Loss	(Ukraine) Roman Kryklia	Akhmat Fight Show	Grozny, Russia	Decision (unanimous)	3	3:00
2015-11-21	Loss	(Turkey) Murat Aygun	Kunlun Fight 34	Shenzhen, China	Decision	3	3:00
2015-03-17	Loss	(Netherlands) Hesdy Gerges	Kunlun Fight 21 - Super Heavyweight Tournament, Quarter Finals	Sanya, China	TKO (low kicks)	3	0:35
2015-02-01	Win	(United States) Mighty Mo	Kunlun Fight 18: The Return of the King - Super Heavyweight Tournament, Final 16	Guangzhou, China	TKO (elbow injury)	1	2:00
2010-12-29	Loss	(Azerbaijan) Zamig Athakishiyev	RMO 2010 Istanbul Finals	Istanbul, Turkey	DQ	4	
Fight was for RMO Istanbul tournament title.
2010-12-29	Win	(Kazakhstan) Murat Kadirov	RMO 2010 Istanbul Semi Finals	Istanbul, Turkey	KO (spinning back kick)	1	
2010-12-29	Win	(Turkey) Kadir Yıldırım	RMO 2010 Istanbul Quarter Finals	Istanbul, Turkey	TKO (retirement)	1	
2010-11-13	Win	(Tanzania) Awadh Tamim	WFCA – Fight Arena: Latvia vs. Russia	Riga, Latvia	KO (punches)	1	1:05
2010-04-24	Win	(Russia) Vitaly Shemetov	K-1 World Grand Prix Selection 2010 Final	Istanbul, Turkey	KO (low kicks)	2	1:07
Wins K-1 World Grand Prix Selection 2010 tournament title.
2010-04-24	Win	(Azerbaijan) Zamig Athakishiyev	K-1 World Grand Prix Selection 2010 Semi Finals	Istanbul, Turkey	Decision (unanimous)	3	3:00
2010-04-24	Win	(Netherlands) Brian Douwes	K-1 World Grand Prix Selection 2010 Quarter Finals	Istanbul, Turkey	Decision (unanimous)	3	3:00
2010-03-28	Loss	(Australia) Paul Slowinski	K-1 World Grand Prix 2010 in Warsaw	Warsaw, Poland	KO (right overhand punch)	2	
2009-10-22	Win	(Ukraine) Stanislav Belokonj	Warrior's Honor	Kharkov, Ukraine	Decision (unanimous)	3	3:00
2009-10-22	Win	(Russia) Ibragim Magomedov	Warrior's Honor, 4-men tournament, final	Kharkov, Ukraine	КО	1	1:17
2009-10-22	Win	(Belarus) Yurii Dubko	Warrior's Honor, 4-men tournament, 1/2 final	Kharkov, Ukraine	Unanimous decision	3	2:00
2009-03-26	Loss	(Ukraine) Pavel Zhuravlev	WBKF World Tournament, Final (+93 kg) @ Club Arbat	Moscow, Russia	Decision (unanimous)	3	3:00
Fight was for WBKF World Super Heavyweight (+93 kg) tournament title.
2009-03-26	Win	(Russia) Elvin Abbasov	WBKF World Tournament, Semi Finals (+93 kg) @ Club Arbat	Moscow, Russia	Decision (unanimous)	3	3:00
2009-02-27	Loss	(Azerbaijan) Zabit Samedov	K-1 Professional International Tournament	Baku, Azerbaijan	Decision (unanimous)	3	3:00
2008-12-17	Win	(Ukraine) Pavel Zhuravlev	Final tournament of the project “Warrior's Honor”	Kharkov, Ukraine	Decision (unanimous)	3	3:00
Won Warrior's Honor title.
2008-12-17	Win	(Ukraine) Alexey Gonchar	Final tournament of the project “Warrior's Honor”	Kharkov, Ukraine	KO	1	0:38
2008-12-17	Win	(Russia) Artur Hamidulin	Final tournament of the project “Warrior's Honor”	Kharkov, Ukraine	TKO (corner stop)	1	0:33
2008-11-22	Win	(Lithuania) Mindaugas Sakalauskas	K-1 World Grand Prix 2008 in Riga Final	Riga, Latvia	TKO (low kicks)	2	0:41
Wins K-1 World Grand Prix 2008 in Riga tournament title.
2008-11-22	Win	(France) Pacome Assi	K-1 World Grand Prix 2008 in Riga Semi Finals	Riga, Latvia	KO (spinning back kick)	2	1:47
2008-11-22	Win	(Italy) Marco Della Ricca	K-1 World Grand Prix 2008 in Riga Quarter Finals	Riga, Latvia	KO	1	0:26
2008-10-18	Loss	(Suriname) Ashwin Balrak	Latvijā – "Milžu cīņas"	Liepāja, Latvia	Decision (majority)	3	3:00
2008-08-18	Loss	(Hungary) Attila Karacs	K-1 Rules Tournament 2008 in Hungary	Debrecen, Hungary	Ext. R decision	4	3:00
2008-05-23	Win	(Ukraine) Dmitry Borulko	Qualifying tournament of the project "Warrior's Honor"	Kharkov, Ukraine	TKO	3	1:44
2008-05-23	Win	(Ukraine) Sergey Kravchina	Qualifying tournament of the project "Warrior's Honor"	Kharkov, Ukraine	KO	2	1:22
2008-05-23	Win	(Russia) Muhamadshin	Qualifying tournament of the project "Warrior's Honor"	Kharkov, Ukraine	KO	1	0:36
2008-04-04	Loss	(Ukraine) Pavel Zhuravlev	Qualifying tournament of the project “Warrior's Honor”	Kharkov, Ukraine	Decision (split)	3	3:00
2008-04-04	Win	(Armenia) Badalian	Qualifying tournament of the project “Warrior's Honor”	Kharkov, Ukraine	KO	2	0:20
2008-04-04	Win	(Ukraine) Andrii Embalaev	Qualifying tournament of the project “Warrior's Honor”	Kharkov, Ukraine	KO	1	1:30
2007-10-21	Loss	(Russia) Shamil Abdurahimov	Yalta Open World Championship kickjitsu 1/2 final	Yalta, Ukraine	Unanimous decision 3:0	3	2:00
2007-10-20	Loss	(Ukraine) Dmitry Bezus	Kickboxing World Cup	Yalta, Ukraine	Decision	3	3:00
2007-10-13	Draw	(Trinidad and Tobago) Gary Goodridge	K-1 Fighting Network Latvia 2007	Riga, Latvia	Decision draw	3	3:00
2007-07-13	Win	(Turkey) Yuksel Ayaydin	A1 Kickbox	Turkey	3	3:00	
2007-07-06	Win	(France) Stephane Gomis	A-1 Cyprus	Nikosia, Cyprus	TKO (corner stoppage)	3	2:59
2007-06-06	Loss	(Belarus) Alexei Kudin	WBKF World championship (+96 kg) @ Club Arbat	Sochi, Russia	Unanimous decision 3:0	10	2:00
Fight for WBKF World championship (+96 кг).
2007-04-28	Loss	(Germany) Florian Ogunade	MFN Fight Night	Duisburg, Germany	Ext. R decision (split)	6	3:00
2006-11-04	Loss	(Ukraine) Maksim Neledva	K-1 Fighting Network Riga 2006 Semi Finals	Riga, Latvia	Ext. R decision (majority)	4	3:00
2006-11-04	Win	(Russia) Denis Sobolyev	K-1 Fighting Network Riga 2006 Quarter Finals	Riga, Latvia	KO	1	1:07
2006-10-04	Win	(Ukraine) Alexander Kitichenko	Yalta Open World Championship kickjitsu Final	Yalta, Ukraine	KO	1	1:21
2006-10-03	Win	(Ukraine) kickboxing fighter	Yalta Open World Championship kickjitsu 1/2 final	Yalta, Ukraine	KO	1	0:30
2006-05-06	Loss	(Germany) Karl Glyschinski	Masters Fight Night Heavyweight tournament, final	Düsseldorf, Germany	Decision (split)	3	3:00
Fight was for Masters Fight Night 2006 tournament title.
2006-05-06	Win	(Germany) Florian Ogunade	Masters Fight Night Heavyweight tournament, semi final	Düsseldorf, Germany	Ext R. decision (unanimous)	4	3:00
2006-05-06	Win	(Morocco) Mounier Zekhnini	Masters Fight Night Heavyweight tournament, quarter final	Düsseldorf, Germany	Decision (unanimous)	3	3:00
2006-03-29	Loss	(Belarus) Eduard Voznovich	WBKF European championship (+96 kg) @ Club Arbat	Moscow, Russia	Decision (unanimous)	8	2:00
Voznovich defended his WBKF Super Heavyweight (+96 kg) European title.
2005-09-30	Win	(Ukraine) fighter from Poltava city	Muai Thai Championship Yalta Open	Yalta, Ukraine	Decision (unanimous)	3	2:00
2005-05-28	Win	(Russia) Yevgeny Orlov	2nd Draka European Championships Finals	Riga, Latvia	Decision (145:143)	5	2:00
Wins 2nd Draka European Championships (+90 kg) tournament title.
2005-05-28	Win	(Ukraine) Andrey Kindrich	2nd Draka European championships 1/2 finals	Riga, Latvia	Decision (147:140)	5	2:00
2005-04-29	Win	(Hungary) Tihomir Brunner	Draka European championships, superfight	Riga, Latvia	Decision (unanimous)	5	2:00
2005-03-14	Win	(Croatia) Alexander Novovic	2nd Draka European championships 1st Stage	Riga, Latvia	KO	4	
2005-01-12	Loss	(Belarus) Eduard Voznovich	WBKF European championship (+96 kg) Final @ Club Arbat	Moscow, Russia	Decision (unanimous)	8	2:00
Fight was for WBKF Super Heavyweight (+96 kg) European title.
2004-09-01	Win	(Ukraine) Andrey Kindrich	Club Cristal	Moscow, Russia	Decision (unanimous)	5	2:00
2004-07-28	Win	(Ukraine) Yaroslav Zavorotnyi	WBKF European championship (+93 kg) 1/4 Final @ Club Arbat	Moscow, Russia	Decision (unanimous)	5	3:00
2004-05-09	Win	(Tunisia) Mourad Bouzidi	1st Draka European Championships Finals	Riga, Latvia	Decision	5	2:00
Wins 1st Draka European Championships (+90 kg) tournament title.
2004-05-09	Win	(Finland) Petri Reima	1st Draka European Championships 1/2 finals	Riga, Latvia	Decision	5	2:00
2004-05-09	Win	(Netherlands) Jessie Gibbs	1st Draka European Championships 1/4 finals	Riga, Latvia	KO (left high kick)	1	
2004-04-21	Win	(Belarus) Eduard Voznovich	WBKF (+93 kg) @ Club Arbat	Moscow, Russia	KO	3	
2004-03-31	Win	(Russia) Mikhail Shvoev	WBKF (+93 kg) @ Club Arbat	Moscow, Russia	TKO	4	
2004-02-25	Win	(Belarus) Andrei Zuravkov	WBKF (+93 kg) @ Club Arbat	Moscow, Russia	Decision (split)	5	3:00
2004-01-28	Win	(Georgia (country)) David Shvelidze	WBKF (+93 kg) @ Club Arbat	Moscow, Russia	TKO	4	
2003-08-30	Loss	(Kyrgyzstan) Ruslan Abbasov	WAKO World Championship, low-kick	Yalta, Ukraine	Decision (split)	3	2:00
2003-08-29	Win	(Russia) Ruslan Bisaev	WAKO World Championship, low-kick	Yalta, Ukraine	КО	2	1:16
2003-08-28	Win	(Serbia) Dragan Jovovich	WAKO World Championship, low-kick	Yalta, Ukraine	TKO	1	1:24
2003-08-15	Win	(Ukraine) Taras Vorotnik	Bogdan Khmelnitsky Cup	Cherkasy, Ukraine	КО	3	1:15
2003-03-23	Win	(Lithuania) Marius Skirius	Ringa Karali 7	Riga, Latvia	TKO	6	2:00
Won WPKA Heavyweight Champion of Baltia low-kick (+88.5 kg).
2002-10-08	Win	(Kazakhstan) Aslan Khazamatov	III Open Asian Kickboxing championship	Astana, Kazakhstan	Ext. R decision	4	3:00
Won WPKA Heavyweight Champion of Asia (+88.5 kg) title.
2002-02-21	Win	(Latvia) Toms Ievins	Ringa Karali 5	Riga, Latvia	Decision (unanimous)	7	2:00
Won WPKA Heavyweight Champion of Latvia low-kick (+88.5 kg).
2001-05-19	Win	(Estonia) Stanislav Evteev	Ringa Karali 4	Riga, Latvia	ТКО	3	1:36
2000-10-14	Win	(Russia) Roman Krasnikov	Kinga Karali 2	Riga, Latvia	Decision	10	2:00
Won IKF European Kickboxing title.
2000-04-13	Win	(Russia) Roman Krasnikov	Ringa Karali 1	Riga, Latvia	Decision (unanimous)	3	2:00
|- Legend: Win Loss Draw/no contest Notes

== Mixed martial arts record ==
Professional record breakdown
52 matches	35 wins	17 losses
By knockout	26	4
By submission	3	4
By decision	6	8
By disqualification	0	1

Res.	Record	Opponent	Method	Event	Date	Round	Time	Location	Notes
Win	35–17	Mikhail Gazaev	Decision (unanimous)	AMC Fight Nights 120	June 14, 2023	3	5:00	Ulyanovsk, Russia	
Win	34–17	Oleg Kubanov	TKO	Samara MMA Federation: Battle on the Volga 7	November 4, 2018	1	2:17	Kazan, Russia	
Win	33–17	Dritan Barjamaj	TKO	Hit Fighting Championship 6	June 2, 2018	1	4:41	Zürich, Switzerland	Won the HIT FC Heavyweight Championship belt
Win	32–17	Rodney Wallace	KO (spinning back kick to the body)	ProFC 63	September 10, 2017	2	2:58	Rostov-on-Don, Russia	
Loss	31–17	Kleber Silva	Decision (unanimous)	M-1 Challenge 81 - Battle in the Mountains 6	July 22, 2017	3	5:00	Nazran, Russia	
Win	31–16	Istvan Ruzsinszki	TKO (arm injury)	FFC - Faith Fighting Championship	June 25, 2016	1	4:21	Shenzhen, China	
Win	30–16	Sandro Vieira da Silva	TKO (punches)	SH - Super Hero 1	May 28, 2016	1	2:45	Nanchang, China	
Win	29–16	Tony Lopez	Decision (unanimous)	Kunlun Fight 44	May 14, 2016	2	5:00	Khabarovsk, Russia	
Loss	28–16	Ante Delija	Decision (unanimous)	M-1 Challenge 56	April 10, 2015	3	3:00	Moscow, Russia	
Loss	28–15	Damian Grabowski	Submission (arm-triangle choke)	M-1 Challenge 53 - Battle in the Celestial Empire	November 25, 2014	3	1:47	Beijing, China	
Win	28–14	Valentijn Overeem	KO (punch)	PFC 6 – Pancrase Fighting Championship 6	April 12, 2014	1	2:33	Marseille, France	Defended PFC Heavyweight Championship
Win	27–14	Kenny Garner	Decision (unanimous)	M-1 Challenge 46	March 14, 2014	3	5:00	St. Petersburg, Russia	
Loss	26–14	Mikhail Gazaev	DQ (illegal kick)	M-1 Challenge 44	November 30, 2013	3	1:03	Tula, Russia	Kicked the head of grounded opponent.
Loss	26–13	Marcin Tybura	Submission (rear-naked choke)	M-1 Challenge 42: Final grand prix 2013	October 20, 2013	1	4:30	St. Petersburg, Russia	M-1 Grand Prix: Final
Win	26–12	Valentijn Overeem	KO (knee)	PFC 5 – Pancrase Fighting Championship 5	April 27, 2013	1		Marseille, France	Defended PFC Heavyweight Championship
Win	25–12	Kenny Garner	Decision (split)	M-1 Challenge 38: Spring Battle	April 9, 2013	3	5:00	St. Petersburg, Russia	M-1 Grand Prix: Quarter Finals
Loss	24–12	Peter Graham	TKO (punches)	Draka 11	November 24, 2012	1	3:20	Moscow, Russia	
Loss	24–11	Alexander Emelianenko	Decision (unanimous)	M-1 Challenge 34	September 30, 2012	3	5:00	Moscow, Russia	
Loss	24–10	Alexei Kudin	Decision (unanimous)	RMMAC – Russian MMA Championship	June 1, 2012	2	5:00	Saint Petersburg, Russia	Russian MMA Championship tournament final.
Win	24–9	Andrei Sen	KO (head kick)	RMMAC – Russian MMA Championship	June 1, 2012	1		Saint Petersburg, Russia	Russian MMA Championship tournament semi-final.
Win	23–9	Timur Shikhmagomedo	TKO (punches)	RMMAC – Russian MMA Championship	June 1, 2012	1		Saint Petersburg, Russia	Russian MMA Championship tournament quarter-final.
Win	22–9	Alexander Sitalo	KO (punch)	Fight Star – Taktarov's Cup	April 26, 2012	2	2:39	Novgorod, Russia	
Win	21–9	Viktor Matviychuk	TKO (punch)	Oplot Challenge	March 25, 2012	1	0:52	Kharkiv, Ukraine	
Loss	20–9	Peter Graham	KO (punch)	Governor's Cup 2012	February 11, 2012	2	2:47	Khabarovsk, Russia	
Loss	20–8	Alexei Kudin	Decision (unanimous)	WUFC: Challenge of Champions	December 24, 2011	2	5:00	Makhachkala, Russia	
Loss	20–7	Jermaine van Rooy	TKO (knee injury)	Klondaika Fight Arena	October 8, 2011	1		Riga, Latvia	
Win	20–6	Valdas Pocevicius	TKO (body punch)	Fight Stars	July 22, 2011	1	1:33	Anapa, Russia	
Win	19–6	Ruslan Magomedov	TKO (body punch)	Warrior's Honor 3	May 27, 2011	1	1:19	Kharkiv, Ukraine	Warrior's Honor 3 Finals
Win	18–6	Yuri Gorbenko	Submission (toe hold)	Warrior's Honor 3	May 27, 2011	1	2:35	Kharkiv, Ukraine	Warrior's Honor 3 Semifinals
Win	17–6	Jessie Gibbs	TKO (body punch)	Pancrase Fighting Championship 3	February 4, 2011	1	3:24	Marseille, France	Won the PFC Heavyweight Championship
Win	16–6	Arnold Oborotov	Submission (toe hold)	Pancrase Fighting Championship 3	February 4, 2011	1	0:38	Marseille, France	PFC Heavyweight Championship Tournament Semifinals
Win	15–6	Michał Kita	TKO	Fighters Arena Łódź 2	March 26, 2011	2	5:00	Łódź, Poland	
Loss	14–6	Baga Agaev	Submission (armbar)	UAMA: Honor of Warrior	January 28, 2011	1	1:30	Kharkiv, Ukraine	
Win	14–5	Radoslav Radev	KO (punches)	UCFC – 20.000 Euro Tournament, Finals	December 4, 2010	1	1:05	Vienna, Austria	Wins UCFC 2010 Heavyweight Tournament.
Win	13–5	Miodrag Petkovic	KO (punches)	UCFC – 20.000 Euro Tournament, Semi Finals	December 4, 2010	2	3:42	Vienna, Austria	UCFC 2010 Heavyweight Tournament Semi-Final.
Win	12–5	Grigor Aschugbabjan	TKO (punches)	UCFC – 20.000 Euro Tournament, Quarter Finals	December 4, 2010	1	2:17	Vienna, Austria	UCFC 2010 Heavyweight Tournament Quarter-Final.
Win	11–5	Chris Male	KO (punches)	UCFC – 20.000 Euro Tournament	December 4, 2010	1	1:00	Vienna, Austria	UCFC 2010 Heavyweight Tournament Opening Round.
Win	10–5	Salimgirey Rasulov	KO (punches)	International League MMA – Oleg Traktarov Cup	November 26, 2010	2	1:52	Saransk, Russia	Oleg Taktarov Cup Finals
Win	9–5	Vagam Bodjukyan	KO (punches)	International League MMA – Oleg Taktarov Cup	November 26, 2010	1	4:05	Saransk, Russia	Oleg Taktarov Cup Semifinals
Win	8–5	Alexander Romaschenko	TKO (punches)	Warrior's Honor 2	September 23, 2010	1	1:35	Kharkiv, Ukraine	Warrior's Honor 2 Finals
Win	7–5	Vitalii Yalovenko	TKO (punches)	Warrior's Honor 2	September 23, 2010	3	0:23	Kharkiv, Ukraine	Warrior's Honor 2 Semifinals
Loss	6–5	David Oliva	Decision (unanimous)	KSW 13: Kumite	May 7, 2010	3	5:00	Katowice, Poland	KSW Heavyweight Tournament Finals
Win	6–4	Daniel Omielańczuk	Decision (majority)	KSW 12: Pudzianowski vs. Najman	December 11, 2009	2	5:00	Warsaw, Poland	KSW Heavyweight Tournament Semifinals
Loss	5–4	Miodrag Petkovic	TKO (knee injury)	UCFC – 20.000 Dollar Tournament	April 4, 2009	1	0:29	Vienna, Austria	UCFC 2009 Heavyweight Tournament Semi-final.
Win	5–3	Grigor Aschugbabjan	TKO (corner stoppage)	UCFC – 20.000 Dollar Tournament	April 4, 2009	3	68:07	Vienna, Austria	UCFC 2009 Heavyweight Tournament Quarter-final.
Win	4–3	Slavomir Molnar	TKO (corner stoppage)	UCFC – 20.000 Dollar Tournament	April 4, 2009	2	5:00	Vienna, Austria	UCFC 2009 Heavyweight Tournament Opening Round.
Loss	3–3	Ibragim Magomedov	TKO (punches)	IAFC: Russia vs The World	November 29, 2008	1	1:37	Novosibirsk, Russia	
Win	3–2	Tadas Rimkevicius	Decision (unanimous)	WFCA Fight Club Riga 2	September 27, 2008	4	3:00	Riga, Latvia	
Win	2–2	Peter Mulder	Submission	WFCA: Latvia vs the Netherlands	April 19, 2008	1		Riga, Latvia	Won WFCA European Heavyweight Championship
Loss	1–2	Dan Evensen	Decision (unanimous)	BodogFIGHT: USA vs Russia	November 30, 2007	3	5:00	Moscow, Russia	
Loss	1–1	Todd Gouwenberg	Decision (unanimous)	BodogFIGHT: Vancouver	August 25, 2007	3	5:00	Vancouver, British Columbia, Canada	
Win	1–0	Atte Backman	TKO (injury)	Fight Festival 19	September 16, 2006	1	0:50	Helsinki, Finland	

== UNIFIGHT record ==
UNIFIGHT
11 fights, 10 victories (6 KOs, 4 opponents retired), 1 loss (1 decision)
Date	Result	Opponent	Event	Location	Method	Round	Time
2009-10-26	Loss	(Russia) Shamil Magomedov	ЧМ UNIFIGHT, No.10	Prague, Czech Republic	Unanimous decision	5	2:00
2009-10-26	Win	(Uzbekistan) Orgikbek Palvanov	ЧМ UNIFIGHT, No.10	Prague, Czech Republic	ТКО	1	1:14
2009-10-26	Win	(Israel) Oleg Hait	ЧМ UNIFIGHT, No.10	Prague, Czech Republic	КО	1	0:35
2009-09-20	Win	(Russia) Nikolaj Titov	ЧЕ UNIFIGHT	Qusar, Azerbaijan	КО	1	0:27
2009-09-19	Win	(Azerbaijan) Bahruz Farhadov	ЧЕ UNIFIGHT	Qusar, Azerbaijan	opponent retired	0	0:00
2008-10-26	Win	(Russia) Goncharov	ЧМ UNIFIGHT, No.9	Kaliningrad, Russia	КО	1	0:22
2008-10-25	Win	(Azerbaijan) hand-to-hand combater	ЧМ UNIFIGHT, No.9	Kaliningrad, Russia	КО	1	0:39
2008-10-24	Win	(Moldova) hand-to-hand combater	ЧМ UNIFIGHT, No.9	Kaliningrad, Russia	opponent retired	0	0:00
2006-09-03	Win	(Russia) Dmitrij Zabolotnij	ЧМ UNIFIGHT, No.7	Kaliningrad, Russia	opponent retired	0	0:00
2006-09-02	Win	(Ukraine) Babij	ЧМ UNIFIGHT, No.7	Kaliningrad, Russia	KO (low-kick)	2	1:18
2006-09-01	Win	(Uzbekistan) hand-to-hand combater	ЧМ UNIFIGHT, No.7	Kaliningrad, Russia	ТKO (submission)	2	0:44

== BIGGER'S BETTER BOXING record ==
BIGGER'S BETTER BOXING
4 fights, 3 victories (1 КО), 1 loss (1 decision)
Date	Result	Opponent	Event	Location	Method	Round	Time
2012-12-14	Loss	(Lithuania) Sergej Maslobojev	BIGGER'S BETTER KING	Riga, Latvia	Unanimous decision	5	3:00
2012-05-25	Win	(Poland) Kamil Sokolowski	BIGGER'S BETTER 12	Vilnius, Lithuania	Unanimous decision	3	3:00
2012-05-25	Win	(Romania) Adrian Poputea	BIGGER'S BETTER 12	Vilnius, Lithuania	ТКО	3	2:18
2012-05-25	Win	(Lithuania) Sergej Maslobojev	BIGGER'S BETTER 12	Vilnius, Lithuania	Unanimous decision	3	3:00

== See also ==
- List of K-1 events
- List of K-1 champions
- List of male kickboxers
