= Daniel Acácio =

Brazilian mixed martial arts fighter

- Born: 29 December 1977 (age 48); Botucatu, Brazil
- Other names: The Viking Hunter
- Height: 5 ft 10 in (1.78 m)
- Weight: 183 lb (83 kg; 13.1 st)
- Division: Welterweight; Middleweight
- Reach: 73 in (185 cm)
- Style: MMA, Shooto, hybrid martial arts, Brazilian jiu-jitsu, wrestling, submission wrestling
- Fighting out of: Rio de Janeiro, Brazil
- Team: CM System; Chute Boxe Academy
- Trainer: Cristiano Marcello (2000-present)
- Rank: black belt in Brazilian Jiu-Jitsu
- Years active: 2000–present

Mixed martial arts record
- Total: 49
- Wins: 31
- By knockout: 13
- By submission: 4
- By decision: 13
- By disqualification: 1
- Losses: 18
- By knockout: 4
- By submission: 4
- By decision: 11
- By disqualification: 0
- Draws: 0
- No contests: 0

Other information
- Mixed martial arts record from Sherdog
- Last updated on: 30 January 2011

Daniel Acácio (born 27 December 1977) is a Brazilian professional mixed martial artist, also current Superior Challenge Welterweight Champion and 100% Fight Middleweight Champion. He is most notable for his fights in PRIDE Fighting Championships and has previously fought for M-1 Global, Shooto, Pancrase, Impact FC, Jungle Fight, Fight Festival and Konfrontacja Sztuk Walki.

== Championships and accomplishments ==
=== Mixed martial arts ===
- 100% Fight
  - 100% Fight Middleweight Championship (One time, current)
- Fury FC
  - Fury FC Middleweight Grand Prix Finalist (2007)
- Konfrontacja Sztuk Walki
  - Fight of the Night (One time) vs. Aslambek Saidov
- Superior Challenge
  - Superior Challenge Welterweight Championship (One time)

== Mixed martial arts record ==
Professional record breakdown
50 matches	31 wins	19 losses
By knockout	13	4
By submission	4	4
By decision	13	11
By disqualification	1	0

Res.	Record	Opponent	Method	Event	Date	Round	Time	Location	Notes
Loss	31–19	Nico Musoke	Decision (unanimous)	Superior Challenge 18	1 December 2018	3	5:00	Stockholm, Sweden	
Win	31–18	Jivko Stoimenov	KO (punch)	Porto Fight Club 3	9 June 2018	1	1:35	Braga, Portugal	
Loss	30–18	Renato Gomes	Decision (unanimous)	Aspera FC 12	12 September 2015	3	5:00	São José, Brazil	
Loss	30–17	Rafal Moks	Submission (guillotine choke)	KSW 28	4 October 2014	1	4:42	Szczecin, Poland	
Loss	30–16	Sergio Souza	KO (punch)	THF: The Hill Fighters 2	12 July 2014	2	0:21	Gramado, Brazil	
Loss	30–15	Alan Carlos	KO (punch)	Superior Challenge: Helsingborg	3 May 2014	1	0:36	Helsingborg, Sweden	
Loss	30–14	Aslambek Saidov	Decision (unanimous)	KSW 25	7 December 2013	3	5:00	Wrocław, Poland	For the KSW Welterweight Championship. Fight of the Night.
Win	30–13	Silmar Nunes	Decision (unanimous)	Iron Fight Combat 4	7 September 2013	3	5:00	Paraná, Brazil	
Win	29–13	Guilherme Gomes	Decision (unanimous)	Shooto - Brasil 33: BOPE II	25 August 2012	3	5:00	Rio de Janeiro, Brazil	
Win	28–13	Patrick Vallée	Decision (unanimous)	100% Fight 11: Explosion	11 May 2012	3	5:00	Paris, France	Won the 100% Fight Middleweight Championship.
Loss	27–13	Pete Spratt	Decision (unanimous)	Amazon Forest Combat 2	31 March 2012	3	5:00	Manaus, Brazil	Although Acacio was knocked out with a spinning backfist, it was after the 5 minute mark and it went to decision
Win	27–12	Arimarcel Santos	KO (punches)	Iron Man Championship 13	12 January 2012	1	2:45	Belém, Brazil	
Win	26–12	Jose Gomes de Ribamar	TKO (punches)	Kumite MMA Combate	28 October 2011	2	2:57	Porto Alegre, Brazil	
Win	25–12	Luis Melo	KO (punches)	Amazon Forest Combat 1	14 September 2011	1	2:50	Manaus, Brazil	
Loss	24–12	Hernani Perpetuo	Decision (split)	Clube da Luta	20 July 2011	3	3:00	Rio de Janeiro, Brazil	Welterweight Grand Prix Semifinal
Win	24–11	Felipe Arinelli	KO (punches)	Fatality Arena 3	28 May 2011	1	2:58	Niterói, Brazil	
Win	23–11	Diego Gonzalez	Decision (unanimous)	Superior Challenge 7	30 Apr 2011	3	5:00	Stockholm, Sweden	Defended the Superior Challenge Welterweight Championship.
Loss	22–11	Bruno Santos	Decision (unanimous)	WFE 8: Platinum	15 December 2010	5	5:00	Brazil	For the WFE Middleweight Championship.
Win	22–10	David Bielkheden	DQ (overturned by SMMAF)	Superior Challenge 6	29 October 2010	3	5:00	Stockholm, Sweden	Wins Superior Challenge Welterweight Championship
Loss	21–10	Paul Daley	Submission (elbow)	Impact FC 2	18 July 2010	3	1:15	Sydney, Australia	
Win	21–9	Cassiano Ricardo Castanho de Freitas	Decision (unanimous)	Platinum Fight Brazil 3	20 May 2010	3	5:00	São Paulo, Brazil	
Loss	20–9	Ivan Jorge	Decision (unanimous)	Floripa Fight 6	20 March 2010	3	5:00	Santa Catarina, Brazil	
Win	20–8	Bobby Rehman	Decision (unanimous)	SC 4: Bad Intentions	31 October 2009	3	5:00	Stockholm, Sweden	
Win	19–8	Pedro Irie	TKO (punches)	First Class Fight 3	18 September 2009	2	4:11	São Paulo, Brazil	
Win	18–8	Jae Young Kim	Decision (majority)	M-1 Challenge 17: Korea	4 July 2009	2	5:00	Seoul, South Korea	
Loss	17–8	Mamed Khalidov	KO (punches)	KSW 11: Khalidov vs. Acacio	15 May 2009	1	1:10	Warsaw, Poland	For the inaugural KSW Light Heavyweight Championship.
Win	17–7	Cassio Drummond	TKO (doctor stoppage)	The Warriors	29 March 2009	2	N/A	Rio de Janeiro, Brazil	
Loss	16–7	Eduardo Pamplona	Decision (split)	Santos Fight Festival	6 December 2008	3	5:00	São Paulo, Brazil	
Win	16–6	Andrew Tigrao	Decision (unanimous)	Mr. Cage 1	15 November 2008	3	5:00	Amazonas, Brazil	
Win	15–6	Eder Jones	Submission (punches)	Win Fight & Entertainment 2	7 November 2008	3	3:15	Bahia, Brazil	
Win	14–6	Tor Troéng	Decision	Fight Festival 23	15 March 2008	3	5:00	Helsinki, Finland	
Loss	13–6	Rousimar Palhares	Submission (heel hook)	Fury FC 5 - Final Conflict	6 December 2007	1	1:22	São Paulo, Brazil	Fury FC 2007 Middleweight Grand Prix Final Round.
Win	13–5	Andre Mikito	Submission (slam)	Fury FC 5 - Final Conflict	6 December 2007	2	3:40	São Paulo, Brazil	Fury FC 2007 Middleweight Grand Prix Semifinal Round.
Win	12–5	Gil de Freitas	Decision (unanimous)	Fury FC 4: High Voltage	4 August 2007	3	5:00	Teresópolis, Brazil	
Win	11–5	Michele Verginelli	Decision (unanimous)	Fury FC 3: Reloaded	19 May 2007	3	5:00	São Paulo, Brazil	
Loss	10–5	Luis Santos	Decision (unanimous)	Roraima Combat 3	1 April 2007	3	5:00	Brazil	
Loss	10–4	Delson Heleno	Decision (unanimous)	Fury FC 2: Final Combat	30 November 2006	3	5:00	São Paulo, Brazil	
Loss	10–3	Ryo Kawamura	KO (punch)	Pancrase: Blow 7	16 September 2006	2	2:40	Tokyo, Japan	
Loss	10–2	Akihiro Gono	Decision (unanimous)	Pride Bushido 9	25 September 2005	2	5:00	Tokyo, Japan	
Win	10–1	Kazuo Misaki	Decision (unanimous)	Pride Bushido 8	17 July 2005	2	5:00	Nagoya, Japan	
Win	9–1	Daiju Takase	TKO (soccer kicks)	Pride Bushido 6	3 April 2005	2	3:34	Yokohama, Japan	
Win	8–1	Danilo Pereira	Decision (unanimous)	Storm Samurai 5	11 May 2004	3	5:00	Curitiba, Brazil	
Win	7–1	Eric Tavares	KO (soccer kicks)	Meca World Vale Tudo 11	5 June 2004	1	2:48	Curitiba, Brazil	
Win	6–1	Buck Greer	KO (punch)	Jungle Fight 2	5 May 2004	1	N/A	Manaus, Brazil	
Win	5–1	Roberto Godoi	TKO (punches)	Meca World Vale Tudo 10	20 December 2003	1	8:39	Curitiba, Brazil	
Win	4–1	Delson Heleno	TKO (corner stoppage)	Meca World Vale Tudo 9	1 August 2003	2	5:00	Curitiba, Brazil	
Win	3–1	Guilherme Lima	TKO (punches)	Meca World Vale Tudo 8	16 May 2003	1	3:50	Curitiba, Brazil	
Win	2–1	Jose Carlos Oliveira	Submission (rear naked choke)	Meca World Vale Tudo 6	31 January 2002	1	1:44	Curitiba, Brazil	
Win	1–1	Silvio de Souza	Submission (keylock)	Meca World Vale Tudo 4	16 December 2000	1	8:07	Curitiba, Brazil	
Loss	0–1	Nilson de Castro	Submission (triangle choke)	Meca World Vale Tudo 1	27 May 2000	1	7:11	Tokyo, Brazil	
