= 2011 in Konfrontacja Sztuk Walki =

Mixed martial arts events

Information
- First date: January 29, 2019
- Last date: November 26, 2011

Events
- Total events: 4

Fights
- Total fights: 32
- Title fights: 2

Chronology
2010 in KSW	2011 in Konfrontacja Sztuk Walki	2012 in KSW

The year 2011 was the eighth year in the history of the Konfrontacja Sztuk Walki, a mixed martial arts promotion based in Poland. In 2011 Konfrontacja Sztuk Walki held 4 events beginning with, KSW Extra 2.

== List of events ==
#	Event title	Date	Arena	Location
1	KSW Extra 2	January 29, 2011	Hala MOSiR	Elk, Poland
2	KSW 15: Contemporary Gladiators	March 19, 2011	Hala Torwar	Warsaw, Poland
3	KSW 16: Khalidov vs. Lindland	May 21, 2011	Ergo Arena	Gdańsk, Poland
4	KSW 17: Revenge	November 26, 2011	Atlas Arena	Łódź, Poland

== KSW Extra 2 ==
KSW Extra 2
- Promotion: Konfrontacja Sztuk Walki
- Date: January 29, 2011
- Venue: Hala MOSiR
- City: Ełk, Poland
- Attendance: 1500

Event chronology
KSW Fight Club	KSW Extra 2	KSW 15

KSW Extra 2 was a mixed martial arts event held on January 29, 2011, at the Hala MOSiR in Ełk, Poland.

=== Results ===
Fight Card
Weight Class				Method	Round	Notes
Middleweight 84 kg	(Poland) Antoni Chmielewski	def.	(Brazil) Vitor Nobrega	Decision (Unanimous - Extra Round)	4
Welterweight 77 kg	(Germany) Ruben Crawford	def.	(Poland) Rafal Blachuta	Decision (Unanimous)	2	Welterweight Tournament Semi-Finals 2
Welterweight 77 kg	(Poland) Aslambek Saidov	def.	(Sweden) Domingos Mestre	Decision (Unanimous)	2	Welterweight Tournament Semi-Finals 1
Lightweight 70 kg	(Poland) Artur Sowiński	def.	(Scotland) Paul Reed	TKO (Punches)	1
Welterweight 77 kg	(Poland) Robert Radomski	def.	(Brazil) Wanderson Silva	Decision (Unanimous - Extra Round)	3	Welterweight Tournament Quarter-Finals 4
Welterweight 77 kg	(Germany) Ruben Crawford	def.	(Poland) Mateusz Strzelczyk	Submission (Rear-Naked Choke)	2	Welterweight Tournament Quarter-Finals 3
Welterweight 77 kg	(Sweden) Domingos Mestre	def.	(Poland) Pawel Glebocki	TKO (Punches)	2	Welterweight Tournament Quarter-Finals 2
Welterweight 77 kg	(Poland) Aslambek Saidov	def.	(Italy) Marco Santi	TKO (Doctor Stoppage)	1	Welterweight Tournament Quarter-Finals 1
Welterweight 77 kg	(Poland) Rafal Blachuta	def.	(Poland) Rafal Schabek	Submission (Rear-Naked Choke)	1	Welterweight Tournament Reserve Fight

=== KSW Extra 2 Tournament Bracket ===
Quarter-Finals; KSW Extra 2
(Poland) Aslambek Saidov	TKO
(Italy) Marco Santi	1r.
(Sweden) Domingos Mestre	TKO
(Poland) Pawel Glebocki	2r.
(Germany) Ruben Crawford	SUB
(Poland) Mateusz Strzelczyk	2r.
(Poland) Robert Radomski	SUB
(Brazil) Wanderson Silva	3r.

Semi-Finals; KSW Extra 2
(Poland) Aslambek Saidov	UD
(Sweden) Domingos Mestre	2r.
(Germany) Ruben Crawford	UD
(Poland) Rafal Blachuta	2r.

Finals; KSW 15
(Poland) Aslambek Saidov	UD
(Germany) Ruben Crawford	3r.

== KSW 15: Khalidov vs. Irvin ==
KSW 15: Khalidov vs. Irvin
- Promotion: Konfrontacja Sztuk Walki
- Date: March 19, 2011
- Venue: Hala Torwar
- City: Warsaw, Poland

Event chronology
KSW Extra 2	KSW 15: Khalidov vs. Irvin	KSW 16

KSW 15: Khalidov vs. Irvin was a mixed martial arts event held on March 19, 2011, at the Hala Torwar in Warsaw, Poland.

=== Results ===
Fight Card
Weight Class				Method	Round	Notes
Middleweight 84 kg	(Poland) Mamed Khalidov	def.	(United States) James Irvin	Submission (Armbar)	1
Light Heavyweight 93 kg	(Cameroon) Rameau Thierry Sokoudjou	def.	(Poland) Jan Błachowicz	TKO (Retirement)	2	For the vacant KSW Light Heavyweight Championship.
Lightweight 70 kg	(Finland) Niko Puhakka	def.	(Poland) Maciej Gorski	Technical Submission (Arm-Triangle Choke)	2	Lightweight Tournament Final
Openweight 95 kg	(Finland) Toni Valtonen	def.	(Poland) Lukasz Jurkowski	Decision (Unanimous)	3
Heavyweight 120 kg	(Spain) Rogent Lloret	def.	(Poland) Karol Bedorf	Decision (Unanimous)	3
Middleweight 84 kg	(England) James Zikic	def.	(Poland) Antoni Chmielewski	Decision (Unanimous)	3
Middleweight 84 kg	(Poland) Michał Materla	def.	(France) Gregory Babene	Submission (Guillotine Choke)	2
Heavyweight 120 kg	(Poland) Marcin Rozalski	def.	(Poland) Marcin Bartkiewicz	TKO (Doctor Stoppage)	2
Welterweight 77 kg	(Russia) Aslambek Saidov	def.	(Germany) Ruben Crawford	Decision (Unanimous)	3	Welterweight Tournament Final

== KSW 16: Khalidov vs. Lindland ==
KSW 16: Khalidov vs. Lindland
- Promotion: Konfrontacja Sztuk Walki
- Date: May 21, 2011
- Venue: Ergo Arena
- City: Gdańsk, Poland

Event chronology
KSW 15	KSW 16: Khalidov vs. Lindland	KSW 17

KSW 16: Khalidov vs. Lindland was a mixed martial arts event held on May 21, 2011, at the Ergo Arena in Gdańsk, Poland.

=== Results ===
Fight Card
Weight Class				Method	Round	Notes
Middleweight 84 kg	(Poland) Mamed Khalidov	def.	(United States) Matt Lindland	Submission (Guillotine Choke)	1
Openweight	(England) James Thompson	def.	(Poland) Mariusz Pudzianowski	Submission (Arm-Triangle Choke)	2
Light Heavyweight 93 kg	(Poland) Jan Błachowicz	def.	(Finland) Toni Valtonen	Submission (Rear-Naked Choke)	2
Middleweight 84 kg	(Poland) Michał Materla	def.	(England) James Zikic	Decision (Unanimous)	2
Lightweight 70 kg	(Poland) Artur Sowiński	def.	(Germany) Cengiz Dana	Decision (Unanimous)	2
Light Heavyweight 93 kg	(Slovakia) Attila Végh	def.	(Armenia) Grigor Ashughbabyan	TKO (Retirement)	2
Heavyweight 120 kg	(Poland) Marcin Różalski	def.	(Russia) Sergey Shemetov	TKO (Arm Injury)	1

== KSW 17: Revenge ==
KSW 17: Revenge
- Promotion: Konfrontacja Sztuk Walki
- Date: November 26, 2011
- Venue: Atlas Arena
- City: Łódź, Poland

Event chronology
KSW 16	KSW 17: Revenge	KSW 18

KSW 17: Revenge was a mixed martial arts event held on April 1, 2011, at the Atlas Arena in Łódź, Poland.

=== Results ===
Fight Card
Weight Class				Method	Round	Notes
Middleweight 84 kg	(Poland) Mamed Khalidov	def.	(United States) Jesse Taylor	Submission (Kneebar)	1
Openweight	(England) James Thompson		(Poland) Mariusz Pudzianowski	No Contest	2
Light Heavyweight 93 kg	(Poland) Jan Błachowicz	def.	(Cameroon) Rameau Thierry Sokoudjou (c)	Decision (Unanimous)	3	For the KSW Light Heavyweight Championship.
Middleweight 84 kg	(Poland) Michał Materla	def.	(United States) Matt Horwich	Decision (Unanimous)	3
Lightweight 70 kg	(Poland) Artur Sowiński	def.	(Poland) Maciej Jewtuszko	KO (Punches)	1
Middleweight 84 kg	(Poland) Antoni Chmielewski	def.	(England) James Zikic	Decision (Split - Extra round)	3
Welterweight 77 kg	(Russia) Aslambek Saidov	def.	(Poland) Rafal Moks	Decision (Majority)	2
