= Andrius =

- Gender: Male
- Name day: 10 November

Origin
- Region of origin: Lithuania

Andrius is a Lithuanian masculine given name. It is a cognate of the English language name Andrew. People with the name Andrius include:

- Andrius Algirdaitis (c.1325–1399), Duke of Pskov and Polotsk
- Andrius Arlauskas (born 1986), Lithuanian footballer
- Andrius Baltuška (born 1971), Lithuanian physicist
- Andrius Blaževičius (born 1985), Lithuanian film director and screenwriter
- Andrius Gedgaudas (born 1978), Lithuanian footballer
- Andrius Giedraitis (born 1973), Lithuanian basketball player
- Andrius Gudžius (born 1991), Lithuanian discus thrower
- Audrius Kšanavičius (born 1977), Lithuanian footballer
- Andrius Kubilius (born 1956), Lithuanian politician, former Prime Minister of Lithuania
- Andrius Mamontovas (born 1967), Lithuanian rock musician, songwriter, actor and record producer
- Andrius Mažutis (born 1981), Lithuanian basketball player
- Andrius Pojavis, (born 1983), Lithuanian pop singer and singer-songwriter
- Andrius Puotkalis (born 1980), Lithuanian footballer
- Andrius Šidlauskas (footballer) (born 1984), Lithuanian footballer
- Andrius Šidlauskas (swimmer) (born 1997), Lithuanian swimmer
- Andrius Skerla (born 1977), Lithuanian footballer
- Andrius Šležas (born 1975), Lithuanian basketball player
- Andrius Tapinas (born 1977), Lithuanian science fiction writer and television presenter
- Andrius Upstas (born 1969), Lithuanian footballer
- Andrius Velička (born 1979), Lithuanian footballer
- Audrius Žuta (born 1969), Lithuanian footballer
