= Daniel Omielańczuk =

Polish mixed martial arts fighter

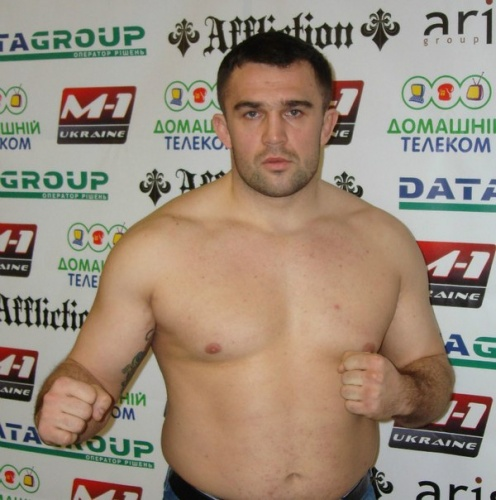
- Born: August 31, 1982 (age 44); Sokołów Podlaski, Poland
- Other names: Polish Bear
- Nationality: Polish
- Height: 6 ft 0 in (1.83 m)
- Weight: 253 lb (115 kg; 18.1 st)
- Division: Heavyweight
- Reach: 74 in (190 cm)
- Fighting out of: Warsaw, Poland
- Team: WCA
- Years active: 2009–present

Mixed martial arts record
- Total: 42
- Wins: 26
- By knockout: 6
- By submission: 10
- By decision: 10
- Losses: 14
- By knockout: 3
- By submission: 2
- By decision: 9
- Draws: 1
- No contests: 1

Other information
- Mixed martial arts record from Sherdog

External image
- Daniel Omielanczuk

Daniel Omielańczuk (born August 31, 1982) is a Polish professional mixed martial artist and kickboxer currently competing in the heavyweight division of Konfrontacja Sztuk Walki (KSW). A professional MMA competitor since 2009, he has competed for the UFC, Absolute Championship Akhmat, and Konfrontacja Sztuk Walki. He is currently ranked #5 in the KSW heavyweight rankings.

== Mixed martial arts career ==
=== Early career ===
Omielańczuk made his professional debut in 2009, competing primarily in regional promotions across the Eastern Europe, including KSW, where he compiled a record of 15–3 before signing with the UFC in the spring of 2013.

=== Ultimate Fighting Championship ===
Omielańczuk made his promotional debut against fellow newcomer Nandor Guelmino on September 21, 2013, at UFC 165. After a back and forth first two rounds, Omielańczuk won the fight via knockout in the third round.

Omielańczuk faced Jared Rosholt on April 19, 2014, at UFC Fight Night 39. Rosholt defeated Omielańczuk via unanimous decision.

Omielańczuk was expected to face Soa Palelei on November 8, 2014, at UFC Fight Night 55. However, Omielańczuk was forced to pull out of bout with a broken thumb and was replaced by Walt Harris.

Omielańczuk faced Anthony Hamilton on April 11, 2015, at UFC Fight Night 64. Omielańczuk lost the fight by unanimous decision.

Omielańczuk was expected to face Konstantin Erokhin on July 18, 2015, at UFC Fight Night 72. However, Erokhin pulled out of the fight in late June citing an injury and was replaced by promotional newcomer Chris de la Rocha. He won the fight via TKO in the first round.

Omielańczuk faced Jarjis Danho on February 27, 2016, at UFC Fight Night 84. He won the fight via technical majority decision after Danho was hit with an inadvertent groin strike in the third round that rendered him unable to continue.

Omielańczuk next faced Alexey Oleynik on July 13, 2016, at UFC Fight Night 91. He won the fight via majority decision.

Omielańczuk faced Stefan Struve on October 8, 2016, at UFC 204. He lost the back and forth fight via submission in the second round.

Omielańczuk faced Timothy Johnson on March 18, 2017, at UFC Fight Night 107. He lost the back and forth fight by split decision.

Omielańczuk faced Curtis Blaydes on July 8, 2017, at UFC 213. He lost the fight by unanimous decision.

=== Absolute Championship Berkut ===
After his third consecutive loss, Omielanczuk was released from the UFC. He later signed with Absolute Championship Berkut, competing against American Bobby Brents at ACB 83: Baku in 2018. He won via first-round submission. After picking up a unanimous decision win in the regional kickboxing circuit, Omielanczuk returned to MMA to face Amir Aliakbari at ACB 89: Krasnodar in September 2018. He was defeated via unanimous decision.

Since the loss to Aliakbari, Omielanczuk has won his last four fights pushing him to 5–1 after leaving the UFC. He fought for the vacant ACA Heavyweight Championship against Tony Johnson at ACA 114: Omielańczuk vs. Johnson. He lost the fight by KO in the first round, marking the first time he has ever lost by strikes.

Omielańczuk faced Daniel James on April 23, 2021, at ACA 122. He won the bout via unanimous decision.

Omielańczuk faced Evgeniy Goncharov on September 11, 2021, at ACA 128. He lost the bout via TKO in the third round.

Omielańczuk faced Adam Bogatyrev on February 26, 2022, at ACA 136: Bukuev vs Akopyan. He lost the bout via unanimous decision.

=== Konfrontacja Sztuk Walki ===
Omielańczuk faced Ricardo Prasel at KSW 70 on May 28, 2022. He lost the bout via ankle lock in the first round.

Omielańczuk faced Michal Martínek on October 14, 2022, at KSW 75: Ruchała vs. Stasiak. He controversially won via split decision, with KSW paying Martinek his show money + his contractual bonus and, upon an official appeal from Martinek's Team submitted, a full independent review of the decision was undertaken.

Omielańczuk faced Michał Kita on February 25, 2023, at KSW 79, losing the bout via ground and pound TKO in the third round.

== Mixed martial arts record ==
Professional record breakdown
42 matches	26 wins	14 losses
By knockout	6	3
By submission	10	2
By decision	10	9
Draws	1	
No contests	1	

Res.	Record	Opponent	Method	Event	Date	Round	Time	Location	Notes
Loss	26–14–1 (1)	Michał Kita	TKO (punches)	KSW 79	February 25, 2023	3	2:06	Liberec, Czech Republic	
Win	26–13–1 (1)	Michal Martínek	Decision (split)	KSW 75	October 14, 2022	3	5:00	Nowy Sącz, Poland	
Loss	25–13–1 (1)	Ricardo Prasel	Submission (ankle lock)	KSW 70	May 28, 2022	1	2:01	Łódź, Poland	
Loss	25–12–1 (1)	Adam Bogatyrev	Decision (unanimous)	ACA 136	February 26, 2022	3	5:00	Moscow, Russia	
Loss	25–11–1 (1)	Evgeniy Goncharov	TKO (punches)	ACA 128	September 11, 2021	3	1:39	Minsk, Belarus	
Win	25–10–1 (1)	Daniel James	Decision (unanimous)	ACA 122	April 23, 2021	3	5:00	Minsk, Belarus	
Loss	24–10–1 (1)	Tony Johnson Jr.	KO (punch)	ACA 114	November 26, 2020	1	1:09	Łódź, Poland	For the vacant ACA Heavyweight Championship.
Win	24–9–1 (1)	Tomas Pakutinskas	TKO (retirement)	ACA 109	August 20, 2020	1	5:00	Łódź, Poland	
Win	23–9–1 (1)	Denis Smoldarev	KO (elbow)	ACA 101	November 15, 2019	1	4:40	Warsaw, Poland	
Win	22–9–1 (1)	Evgeny Erokhin	TKO (punches)	ACA 96	June 8, 2019	1	1:33	Łódź, Poland	
Win	21–9–1 (1)	Zelimkhan Umiev	Decision (unanimous)	ACA 92	February 16, 2019	3	5:00	Warsaw, Poland	
Loss	20–9–1 (1)	Amir Aliakbari	Decision (unanimous)	ACB 89	September 8, 2018	3	5:00	Krasnodar, Russia	
Win	20–8–1 (1)	Bobby Brents	Submission (rear-naked choke)	ACB 83	March 24, 2018	1	2:45	Baku, Azerbaijan	
Loss	19–8–1 (1)	Curtis Blaydes	Decision (unanimous)	UFC 213	July 8, 2017	3	5:00	Las Vegas, Nevada, United States	
Loss	19–7–1 (1)	Timothy Johnson	Decision (split)	UFC Fight Night: Manuwa vs. Anderson	March 18, 2017	3	5:00	London, England	
Loss	19–6–1 (1)	Stefan Struve	Submission (brabo choke)	UFC 204	October 8, 2016	2	1:41	Manchester, England	
Win	19–5–1 (1)	Aleksei Oleinik	Decision (majority)	UFC Fight Night: McDonald vs. Lineker	July 13, 2016	3	5:00	Sioux Falls, South Dakota, United States	
Win	18–5–1 (1)	Jarjis Danho	Technical Decision (majority)	UFC Fight Night: Silva vs. Bisping	February 27, 2016	3	1:31	London, England	Accidental groin strike rendered Danho unable to continue.
Win	17–5–1 (1)	Chris de la Rocha	TKO (punches)	UFC Fight Night: Bisping vs. Leites	July 18, 2015	1	0:48	Glasgow, Scotland	
Loss	16–5–1 (1)	Anthony Hamilton	Decision (unanimous)	UFC Fight Night: Gonzaga vs. Cro Cop 2	April 11, 2015	3	5:00	Kraków, Poland	
Loss	16–4–1 (1)	Jared Rosholt	Decision (unanimous)	UFC Fight Night: Nogueira vs. Nelson	April 11, 2014	3	5:00	Abu Dhabi, United Arab Emirates	
Win	16–3–1 (1)	Nandor Guelmino	KO (punch)	UFC 165	September 21, 2013	3	3:18	Toronto, Ontario, Canada	
Win	15–3–1 (1)	David Tkeshelashvili	Decision (unanimous)	GEFC: Eastern Europe Grand Prix 2012	December 15, 2012	3	5:00	Nakhichevan, Azerbaijan	
Win	14–3–1 (1)	Farrukh Mammadiev	Submission (north-south choke)	Warrior's Honor: Igor Vovchanchyn Cup 2	November 9, 2012	1	N/A	Kharkiv, Ukraine	
Win	13–3–1 (1)	Tadas Miceika	Submission (kimura)	Warrior's Honor: Igor Vovchanchyn Cup 2	November 9, 2012	1	N/A	Kharkiv, Ukraine	
Win	12–3–1 (1)	Julian Bogdanov	Submission (arm-triangle choke)	European Combat Sambo Federation: Kolomyia Cup	October 13, 2012	1	3:06	Kolomyia, Ukraine	
Win	11–3–1 (1)	Evgeniy Timanovskiy	Submission (rear-naked choke)	Warrior's Honor: Igor Vovchanchyn Cup	May 25, 2012	2	1:54	Kharkiv, Ukraine	
Win	10–3–1 (1)	Yuri Gorbenko	Submission (keylock)	Warrior's Honor: Igor Vovchanchyn Cup	May 25, 2012	2	2:24	Kharkiv, Ukraine	
Win	9–3–1 (1)	Ivan Bogdanov	Submission (keylock)	European Combat Sambo Federation: MMA Grand Prix of Eastern Europe 1	April 28, 2012	1	0:17	Kyiv, Ukraine	
Win	8–3–1 (1)	Vladimir Abdulov	Submission (north-south choke)	IFC: Winner Punch 2	March 24, 2012	1	1:58	Piła, Poland	
Win	7–3–1 (1)	Ivan Gayvanovich	Submission (kimura)	Real Fight Promotion: West Fight 3	March 11, 2012	1	1:54	Ternopil, Ukraine	
Win	6–3–1 (1)	Dayman Lake	Decision (unanimous)	Bushido FC: Bushido London 2011	November 5, 2011	3	5:00	London, England	
Win	5–3–1 (1)	Jakub Beresiński	KO (head kick)	All Sports Promotion: Champions Night	August 20, 2011	1	2:29	Koszalin, Poland	
Loss	4–3–1 (1)	Michał Włodarek	Decision (split)	VAC: Victory and Glory	June 10, 2011	2	5:00	Siedlce, Poland	
Draw	4–2–1 (1)	Dmitry Poberezhets	Draw	Fight on the East: Poland vs. Ukraine	January 23, 2011	3	3:00	Rzeszów, Poland	
Win	4–2 (1)	Piotr Mliński	Decision (unanimous)	IFC: Winner Punch	November 19, 2010	3	5:00	Bydgoszcz, Poland	
Win	3–2 (1)	Patryk Gaca	Decision (unanimous)	Fight Night Łobez	October 23, 2010	2	5:00	Łobez, Poland	
Win	2–2 (1)	Błażej Wójcik	Submission (rear-naked choke)	Pro Fight 5	June 18, 2010	1	1:29	Wrocław, Poland	
NC	1–2 (1)	Michał Gutowski	NC (illegal soccer kick)	Iron Fist 2	May 14, 2010	2	2:46	Szczecin, Poland	Accidental illegal soccer kick rendered Gutowski unable to continue.
Loss	1–2	David Oliva	Decision (unanimous)	KSW 12	December 11, 2009	2	5:00	Warsaw, Poland	2009 KSW Heavyweight Grand Prix Semifinal.
Loss	1–1	Konstantin Gluhov	Decision (majority)	KSW 12	December 11, 2009	2	5:00	Warsaw, Poland	2009 KSW Heavyweight Grand Prix Quarterfinal.
Win	1–0	Karol Celiński	Decision (unanimous)	Fight Club Koszalin: Łobez	October 17, 2009	2	5:00	Łobez, Poland	Heavyweight debut.

== See also ==
- List of current KSW fighters
- List of male mixed martial artists
