= Wojciech Orłowski =

- Born: October 14, 1981 (age 45); Racibórz, Poland
- Other names: Gentleman
- Nationality: (Poland) Polish
- Height: 6 ft 2 in (1.88 m)
- Weight: 222 lb (101 kg; 15.9 st)
- Division: Middleweight (2015-2016); Light heavyweight (2007-2013, 2017-); Heavyweight (2009)
- Style: Wrestling
- Team: Nastula Team

Mixed martial arts record
- Total: 17
- Wins: 7
- By knockout: 4
- By submission: 1
- By decision: 2
- Losses: 9
- By knockout: 6
- By submission: 3
- By decision: 0
- Draws: 0
- No contests: 1

Other information
- Mixed martial arts record from Sherdog

Wojciech Orłowski (born October 14, 1981, in Racibórz) is a Polish wrestler and mixed martial artist.

== Mixed martial arts record ==
Professional record breakdown
17 matches	7 wins	9 losses
By knockout	4	6
By submission	1	3
By decision	2	0
No contests	1	

Res.	Record	Opponent	Method	Event	Date	Round	Time	Location	Notes
Loss	7-9 (1)	Adam Kowalski	TKO (head kick and punches)	Granda Pro 7: Lucky 7	October 27, 2018	1	2:07	Warsaw, Poland	
Win	7-8 (1)	Wojciech Balejko	Decision (unanimous)	PLMMA 72: Lomianki	March 4, 2017	3	5:00	Lomianki, Poland	Return to light heavyweight.
Loss	6-8 (1)	Dawid Drobina	Submission (heel hook)	PLMMA 70: Championship Torwar	November 4, 2016	2	N/A	Warsaw, Poland	
Win	6-7 (1)	Pawel Bolanowski	KO (slam and punches)	PLMMA 67: Nastula Cup 1	May 21, 2016	1	0:20	Lomianki, Poland	Catchweight (190 lbs) bout.
Win	5-7 (1)	Krzysztof Pietraszek	Submission (rear-naked choke)	ACB 29: Poland	February 6, 2016	1	2:59	Warsaw, Poland	Catchweight (198 lbs) bout.
Win	4-7 (1)	Jordi Vinyals	TKO (punches)	Ansgar Fighting League 7: Barcelona	January 23, 2016	1	1:17	Barcelona, Spain	
NC	3-7 (1)	Daniel Palomo Diaz	NC (accidental headbutt)	Cagemania 6	November 14, 2015	1	4:00	Mijas, Spain	Middleweight debut.
Loss	3-7	Grzegorz Cieplinski	TKO (knee injury)	Battle of Champions	October 5, 2013	1	0:15	Zamosc, Poland	
Loss	3-6	Michal Pasternak	TKO (punches)	PLMMA 10: 2012 Final	December 29, 2012	1	3:34	Warsaw, Poland	
Loss	3-5	Wojciech Antczak	TKO (punches)	Fight CUp: Battle of Warsaw	November 18, 2011	1	3:42	Warsaw, Poland	
Loss	3-4	Matteo Minonzio	TKO (punches)	KSW Fight Club	October 9, 2010	2	0:36	Ryn, Poland	
Loss	3-3	Jan Błachowicz	Submission (rear-naked choke)	KSW 13: Kumite	May 7, 2010	1	1:37	Katowice, Poland	KSW 2010 Light Heavyweight Semi-finals.
Win	3-2	Tomasz Molski	TKO (punches)	KSW 13: Kumite	May 7, 2010	1	1:07	Katowice, Poland	KSW 2010 Light Heavyweight Quarter-finals.
Loss	2-2	David Oliva	TKO (submission to punches)	KSW 12: Pudzianowski vs. Najman	December 11, 2009	1	2:51	Warsaw, Poland	Heavyweight bout.
Win	2-1	Maciej Marczewski	TKO (punches)	Maximus 1	May 9, 2009	1	3:18	Szczecinek, Poland	
Win	1-1	Arkadiusz Jedraczka	Decision (unanimous)	Maxxx Fight: Fight to Win	October 25, 2008	2	5:00	Warsaw, Poland	
Loss	0-1	Florian Muller	Submission	Fight Club Berlin 9	April 22, 2007	1	3:41	Berlin, Germany	
