= Orlovsky (surname) =

Orlovsky (Орловский) or Orlovski (Орловски), Russian feminine: Orlovskaya is a Russian and Bulgarian surname. Notable people with the surname include:

- Alexey Orlovski (born 1963), Russian artist
- Alina Orlovskaya, real name of Alina Orlova (born 1988), Lithuanian singer and musician
- Boris Orlovsky (1793–1837), Russian academician and sculptor
- Dan Orlovsky (born 1983), American football player
- Dobrin Orlovski, Bulgarian footballer
- Kirill Orlovsky (1895–1968), Soviet partisan commander, a functionary of the Soviet state security agencies (Cheka-GPU-NKVD), and the chairman of a major kolkhoz
- Nikolai Orlovsky, Russian spelling of Nicolae Orlovschi (born 1985), Moldovan footballer
- Peter Orlovsky (1933–2010), American poet
- Radislav Orlovsky (born 1970), Belarusian football coach and a former player
- Stephen Orlofsky (born 1944), American lawyer
- Vladimir Orlovsky (1842 – 1914), Russian painter of Ukrainian origin

== See also ==
- Fred Orlofsky (born 1937), American gymnast
