= Orłowo =

Orłowo may refer to the following places:

- Orłowo, Gdynia, a seaside resort and district of Gdynia
- Orłowo, Inowrocław County in Kuyavian-Pomeranian Voivodeship (north-central Poland)
- Orłowo, Wąbrzeźno County in Kuyavian-Pomeranian Voivodeship (north-central Poland)
- Orłowo, Podlaskie Voivodeship (north-east Poland)
- Orłowo, Maków County in Masovian Voivodeship (east-central Poland)
- Orłowo, Sierpc County in Masovian Voivodeship (central Poland)
- Orłowo, Greater Poland Voivodeship (west-central Poland)
- Orłowo, Pomeranian Voivodeship (north Poland)
- Orłowo, Giżycko County in Warmian-Masurian Voivodeship (north Poland)
- Orłowo, Nidzica County in Warmian-Masurian Voivodeship (north Poland)
- Orłowo, Pisz County in Warmian-Masurian Voivodeship (north Poland)
