= Mykolas Arlauskas =

Lithuanian agronomist (1930–2020)

Mykolas Arlauskas (10 October 1930 – 7 February 2020) was a Lithuanian agronomist, professor of biomedicine, and signatory of the 1990 Act of the Re-Establishment of the State of Lithuania.

Arlauskas was born near Liepāja, Latvia in October 1930. He died on 7 February 2020 at the age of 89.
