= Zuzanna Orłowska =

Zuzanna Orłowska (died after 1583) was the mistress of Sigismund II Augustus. Their relationship lasted for seven years.
