= Andrius Arlauskas =

Lithuanian footballer

Personal information
- Date of birth: 16 January 1986 (age 40)
- Height: 1.73 m (5 ft 8 in)
- Position: Midfielder

Team information
- Current team: FK Ekranas
- Number: 17

Youth career
- FK Ekranas-2 Panevėžys

Senior career*
| Years | Team | Apps | (Gls) |
| 2003 | FK Ekranas-2 | ? | (?) |
| 2004–present | FK Ekranas | 69 | (2) |

International career^{‡}
| 2010– | Lithuania | 1 | (0) |
- * Club domestic league appearances and goals ‡ National team caps and goals as of 2008-10-04

Andrius Arlauskas (born 16 January 1986) is a Lithuanian football midfielder who plays for FK Ekranas.
