= Nicolae Orlovschi =

Moldovan footballer

Personal information
- Full name: Nicolae Orlovschi
- Date of birth: 1 April 1985 (age 41)
- Place of birth: Bălți, Moldavian SSR
- Height: 1.93 m (6 ft 4 in)
- Position: Defender

Senior career*
| Years | Team | Apps | (Gls) |
| 2008–2009 | FC Olimpia | 20 | (3) |
| 2009–2010 | FC Nistru | 15 | (1) |
| 2010–2011 | FC Olimpia | 20 | (3) |
| 2011 | FC Kaisar | 8 | (0) |
| 2011–2012 | FC Olimpia | 29 | (1) |
| 2012–2013 | Ravan Baku FK | 20 | (3) |
| 2013–2014 | FC Dacia Chișinău | 0 | (0) |
| 2014– | FC Bălți | | |

International career
| 2002 | Moldova U17 | 5 | (0) |
| 200? | Moldova U19 | 2 | (0) |
| 2012 | Moldova | 1 | (0) |
- * Club domestic league appearances and goals as of 16 July 2013

Nicolae Orlovschi (born 1 April 1985 in Bălți, Moldavian SSR) is a Moldovan football defender.
