= 2006 in Konfrontacja Sztuk Walki =

Mixed martial arts events

Information
- First date: June 3, 2006
- Last date: October 14, 2006

Events
- Total events: 2

Fights
- Total fights: 17

Chronology
2005 in KSW	2006 in Konfrontacja Sztuk Walki	2007 in KSW

The year 2006 was the third year in the history of the Konfrontacja Sztuk Walki, a mixed martial arts promotion based in Poland. In 2006 Konfrontacja Sztuk Walki held 2 events beginning with, KSW V: Konfrontacja.

== List of events ==
#	Event title	Date	Arena	Location
1	KSW V: Konfrontacja	June 3, 2005	Hotel Marriott	Warsaw, Poland
2	KSW VI: Konfrontacja	October 14, 2006	Hala Torwar	Warsaw, Poland

== KSW V: Konfrontacja ==
KSW V: Konfrontacja
- Promotion: Konfrontacja Sztuk Walki
- Date: June 3, 2006
- Venue: Hotel Marriott
- City: Warsaw, Poland

Event chronology
KSW 4	KSW V: Konfrontacja	KSW 6

KSW V: Konfrontacja was a mixed martial arts event held on June 3, 2006 at the Hotel Marriott in Warsaw, Poland.

=== Results ===
Fight Card
Weight Class				Method	Round	Notes
Light Heavyweight 93 kg	(France) Francis Carmont	def.	(Poland) Robert Jocz	Decision (Unanimous)	2	Tournament Final
Light Heavyweight 93 kg	(Poland) Łukasz Jurkowski	def.	(Slovakia) Ilja Škondrič	TKO (Spinning Back Kick)	2
Light Heavyweight 93 kg	(Poland) Robert Jocz	def.	(Bulgaria) Jordan Radev	Decision (Unanimous)	2	Tournament Semi-Finals 2
Light Heavyweight 93 kg	(France) Francis Carmont	def.	(Poland) Piotr Bagiński	TKO (Knee and Punches)	1	Tournament Semi-Finals 1
Light Heavyweight 93 kg	(Poland) Piotr Bagiński	def.	(Belarus) Vladimir Yushko	Submission (Arm-Triangle Choke)	2	Tournament Quarter-Finals 4
Light Heavyweight 93 kg	(Bulgaria) Jordan Radev	def.	(Russia) Martin Malkhasyan	Decision (Unanimous)	2	Tournament Quarter-Finals 3
Light Heavyweight 93 kg	(Poland) Robert Jocz	def.	(Croatia) Neno Alilovic	TKO (Submission to punches)	1	Tournament Quarter-Finals 2
Light Heavyweight 93 kg	(France) Francis Carmont	def.	(North Macedonia) Goce Candovski	Decision (Unanimous)	2	Tournament Quarter-Finals 1
Lightweight 70 kg	(Poland) Maciej Górski	def.	(Poland) Artur Reżka	TKO (Punches)	1

=== KSW 5 Tournament Bracket ===
Quarterfinals
(Poland) Piotr Bagiński	SUB
(Belarus) Vladimir Yushko	2r.
(France) Francis Carmont	UD
(North Macedonia) Goce Candovski	2r.
(Poland) Robert Jocz	SUB
(Croatia) Neno Alilovic	1r.
(Bulgaria) Jordan Radev	UD
(Russia) Martin Malkhasyan	2r.

Semifinals
(Poland) Piotr Bagiński	1r.
(France) Francis Carmont	TKO
(Poland) Robert Jocz	UD
(Bulgaria) Jordan Radev	3r.

Finals
(France) Francis Carmont	UD
(Poland) Robert Jocz	2r.

== KSW VI: Konfrontacja ==
KSW VI: Konfrontacja
- Promotion: Konfrontacja Sztuk Walki
- Date: October 14, 2006
- Venue: Torwar Hall
- City: Warsaw, Poland

Event chronology
KSW 5	KSW VI: Konfrontacja	KSW 7

KSW VI: Konfrontacja was a mixed martial arts event held on October 14, 2006 at the Torwar Hall in Warsaw, Poland . Alistair Overeem was a special guest at the event.

=== Results ===
Fight Card
Weight Class				Method	Round	Notes
Light Heavyweight 93 kg	(Poland) Michał Materla	def.	(Poland) Krzysztof Kułak	Submission (Guillotine Choke)	1	Tournament Final
Light Heavyweight 93 kg	(Germany) Martin Zawada	def.	(Poland) Łukasz Jurkowski	Decision (Unanimous)	2
Light Heavyweight 93 kg	(Poland) Michał Materla	def.	(Lithuania) Valdas Pocevicius	Submission (Rear-Naked Choke)	1	Tournament Semi-Finals 2
Light Heavyweight 93 kg	(Poland) Krzysztof Kułak	def.	(Poland) Igor Kołacin	Submission (Front Choke)	1	Tournament Semi-Finals 1
Light Heavyweight 93 kg	(Russia) Martin Malkhasyan	def.	(Lithuania) Valdas Pocevicius	Decision (Unanimous)	2	Tournament Quarter-Finals 4
Light Heavyweight 93 kg	(Poland) Michał Materla	def.	(Netherlands) Evert Fyeet	Submission (Rear-Naked Choke)	2	Tournament Quarter-Finals 3
Light Heavyweight 93 kg	(Poland) Krzysztof Kułak	def.	(Brazil) Igor Araújo	Submission (Rear-Naked Choke)	2	Tournament Quarter-Finals 2
Light Heavyweight 93 kg	(Poland) Igor Kołacin	def.	(Croatia) Nikica Gulin	TKO (Submission to punches)	1	Tournament Quarter-Finals 1

=== KSW 6 Tournament Bracket ===
Quarterfinals
(Poland) Igor Kołacin	SUB
(Croatia) Nikica Gulin	1r.
(Poland) Krzysztof Kułak	SUB
(Brazil) Igor Araújo	2r.
(Poland) Michał Materla	SUB
(Netherlands) Evert Fyeet	2r.
(Russia) Martin Malkhasyan	SUB
(Lithuania) Valdas Pocevicius	2r.

Semifinals
(Poland) Igor Kołacin	1r.
(Poland) Krzysztof Kułak	SUB
(Poland) Michał Materla	SUB
(Lithuania) Valdas Pocevicius*	1r.

Finals
(Poland) Krzysztof Kułak	1r.
(Poland) Michał Materla	SUB

*Valdas Pocevicius stepped in semi finals due Martin Malkhasyan was unable to advance competition due to injury
