= 2007 in Konfrontacja Sztuk Walki =

Mixed martial arts events

Information
- First date: June 2, 2007
- Last date: November 10, 2007

Events
- Total events: 3

Fights
- Total fights: 31

Chronology
| 2006 in KSW | 2007 in Konfrontacja Sztuk Walki | 2008 in KSW |

The year 2007 was the fourth year in the history of the Konfrontacja Sztuk Walki, a mixed martial arts promotion based in Poland. In 2007 Konfrontacja Sztuk Walki held 3 events beginning with, KSW VII: Konfrontacja.

== List of events ==
| # | Event title | Date | Arena | Location |
|---|---|---|---|---|
| 1 | KSW VII: Konfrontacja | June 2, 2007 | Torwar Hall | Warsaw, Poland |
| 2 | KSW Elimination 1 | September 15, 2007 | Hala Orbita | Wrocław, Poland |
| 3 | KSW VIII: Konfrontacja | November 10, 2007 | Torwar Hall | Warsaw, Poland |

== KSW VII: Konfrontacja ==
KSW VII: Konfrontacja
- Promotion: Konfrontacja Sztuk Walki
- Date: June 2, 2007
- Venue: Hala Torwar
- City: Warsaw, Poland

Event chronology
| KSW 6 | KSW VII: Konfrontacja | KSW Elimination 1 |

KSW VII: Konfrontacja was a mixed martial arts event held on June 2, 2007 at the Hala Torwar in Warsaw, Poland.

=== Results ===
Fight Card
| Weight Class | | | | Method | Round | Notes |
|---|---|---|---|---|---|---|
| Heavyweight 120 kg | (Russia) Martin Malkhasyan | def. | (Poland) Przemyslaw Saleta | Submission (Rear-Naked Choke) | 1 | Main event |
| Light Heavyweight 93 kg | (Poland) Łukasz Jurkowski | def. | (Armenia) Ishkhan Zakharian | Submission (Triangle Choke) | 1 | Co-main event |
| Light Heavyweight 93 kg | (Brazil) Antonio Mendes | def. | (Germany) Martin Zawada | Decision (Unanimous) | 2 | Tournament Final |
| Light Heavyweight 93 kg | (Brazil) Antonio Mendes | def. | (Poland) Michał Materla | Decision (Split) | 2 | Tournament Semi-Finals 2 |
| Light Heavyweight 93 kg | (Germany) Martin Zawada | def. | (Poland) Krzysztof Kulak | Decision (Split) | 2 | Tournament Semi-Finals 1 |
| Light Heavyweight 93 kg | (Poland) Michał Materla | def. | (Slovakia) Jan Antoska | Submission (Guillotine Choke) | 2 | Tournament Quarter-Finals 4 |
| Light Heavyweight 93 kg | (Brazil) Antonio Mendes | def. | (Poland) Robert Jocz | Decision (Unanimous) | 2 | Tournament Quarter-Finals 3 |
| Light Heavyweight 93 kg | (Germany) Martin Zawada | def. | (Poland) Igor Kolacin | Submission (Rear-Naked Choke) | 2 | Tournament Quarter-Finals 2 |
| Light Heavyweight 93 kg | (Poland) Krzysztof Kułak | def. | (Lithuania) Rimgaudas Kutkaitis | Submission (Rear-Naked Choke) | 1 | Tournament Quarter-Finals 1 |
| Light Heavyweight 93 kg | (Poland) Mamed Khalidov | def. | (Germany) Alexander Stefanovic | TKO (Corner Stoppage) | 1 |
| Light Heavyweight 93 kg | (Poland) Maciej Górski | def. | (Poland) Paweł Jóźwiak | Decision (Unanimous) | 2 |

=== KSW 7 Tournament Bracket ===
Quarterfinals
(Poland) Krzysztof Kułak | SUB
(Lithuania) Rimgaudas Kutkaitis | 1r.
(Germany) Martin Zawada | SUB
(Poland) Igor Kolacin | 2r.
(Brazil) Antonio Mendes | UD
(Poland) Robert Jocz | 3r.
(Poland) Michał Materla | SUB
(Slovakia) Jan Antoska | 2r.

Semifinals
(Poland) Krzysztof Kułak | 3r.
(Germany) Martin Zawada | SD
(Brazil) Antonio Mendes | SD
(Poland) Michał Materla | 2r.

Finals
(Germany) Martin Zawada | 2r.
(Brazil) Antonio Mendes | UD

== KSW Elimination 1 ==
KSW Elimination 1
- Promotion: Konfrontacja Sztuk Walki
- Date: September 15, 2007
- Venue: Hala Orbita
- City: Wrocław, Poland

Event chronology
| KSW 7 | KSW Elimination 1 | KSW 8 |

KSW Elimination was a mixed martial arts event held on September 15, 2007 at the Hala Orbita in Wrocław, Poland.

=== Results ===
Fight Card
| Weight Class | | | | Method | Round | Notes |
|---|---|---|---|---|---|---|
| Light Heavyweight 93 kg | (Poland) Jan Błachowicz | def. | (Poland) Daniel Dowda | TKO (Punches) | 1 | Tournament Final |
| Light Heavyweight 93 kg | (Poland) Mamed Khalidov | def. | (Germany) Martin Zawada | Submission (Toe Hold) | 1 |
| Light Heavyweight 93 kg | (Poland) Krzysztof Kułak | def. | (Netherlands) Evert Fyeet | TKO (Punches) | 1 |
| Light Heavyweight 93 kg | (Poland) Daniel Dowda | def. | (Poland) Robert Swierblewski | Submission (Flying Armbar) | 1 | Tournament Semi-Finals 2 |
| Light Heavyweight 93 kg | (Poland) Jan Błachowicz | def. | (Poland) Pawel Gasinski | TKO (Punches) | 1 | Tournament Semi-Finals 1 |
| Light Heavyweight 93 kg | (Poland) Łukasz Jurkowski | def. | (Poland) Tony Galic | TKO (Submission to punches) | 1 |
| Light Heavyweight 93 kg | (Poland) Mariusz Slotta | def. | (Poland) Marcin Makowski | TKO (Corner Stoppage) | 1 | Tournament Quarter-Finals 4 |
| Light Heavyweight 93 kg | (Poland) Daniel Dowda | def. | (Poland) Pawel Morawski | Submission (Kneebar) | 2 | Tournament Quarter-Finals 3 |
| Light Heavyweight 93 kg | (Poland) Jan Błachowicz | def. | (Poland) Sebastian Olchawa | Decision (Unanimous) | 2 | Tournament Quarter-Finals 2 |
| Light Heavyweight 93 kg | (Poland) Pawel Gasinski | def. | (Poland) Robert Swierblewski | Submission (Armbar) | 1 | Tournament Quarter-Finals 1 |

=== KSW Elimination Tournament Bracket ===
Quarterfinals
(Poland) Pawel Gasinski | SUB
(Poland) Robert Swierblewski | 1r.
(Poland) Jan Błachowicz | UD
(Poland) Sebastian Olchawa | 2r.
(Poland) Daniel Dowda | SUB
(Poland) Pawel Morawski | 2r.
(Poland) Mariusz Slotta | TKO
(Poland) Marcin Makowski | 1r.

Semifinals
(Poland) Pawel Gasinski | 1r.
(Poland) Jan Błachowicz | TKO
(Poland) Daniel Dowda | SUB
(Poland) Robert Swierblewski* | 1r.

Finals
(Poland) Jan Błachowicz | TKO
(Poland) Daniel Dowda | 1r.

*Robert Swierblewski stepped in semi final instead of Mariusz Slotta due to his injury.

== KSW VIII: Konfrontacja ==
KSW VIII: Konfrontacja
- Promotion: Konfrontacja Sztuk Walki
- Date: November 10, 2007
- Venue: Hala Torwar
- City: Warsaw, Poland

Event chronology
| KSW Elimination 1 | KSW VIII: Konfrontacja | KSW Elimination 2 |

KSW VIII: Konfrontacja was a mixed martial arts event held on November 10, 2007 at the Hala Torwar in Warsaw, Poland.

=== Results ===
Fight Card
| Weight Class | | | | Method | Round | Notes |
|---|---|---|---|---|---|---|
| Light Heavyweight 93 kg | (Ukraine) Alexey Oleinik | def. | (Poland) Krzysztof Kułak | Submission (Ezekiel Choke) | 1 | Tournament Final |
| Light Heavyweight 93 kg | (Poland) Mamed Khalidov | def. | (Netherlands) Dave Dalgliesh | Submission (Armbar) | 1 |
| Light Heavyweight 93 kg | (Poland) Łukasz Jurkowski | def. | (France) Moise Rimbon | Decision (Majority) | 3 |
| Light Heavyweight 93 kg | (Ukraine) Alexey Oleinik | def. | (Poland) Karol Bedorf | Submission (Triangle Choke) | 1 | Tournament Semi-Finals 2 |
| Light Heavyweight 93 kg | (Poland) Krzysztof Kułak | def. | (Netherlands) Andre Fyeet | Submission (Guillotine Choke) | 2 | Tournament Semi-Finals 1 |
| Light Heavyweight 93 kg | (Poland) Piotr Bagiński | def. | (Germany) Maik Stumbries | Decision (Majority) | 3 |
| Light Heavyweight 93 kg | (Ukraine) Alexey Oleinik | def. | (Poland) Lukasz Wos | Submission (Rear-Naked Choke) | 1 | Tournament Quarter-Finals 4 |
| Light Heavyweight 93 kg | (Poland) Karol Bedorf | def. | (France) Francis Carmont | Decision (Unanimous) | 2 | Tournament Quarter-Finals 3 |
| Light Heavyweight 93 kg | (Netherlands) Andre Fyeet | def. | (Poland) Jan Błachowicz | Submission (Kimura) | 1 | Tournament Quarter-Finals 2 |
| Light Heavyweight 93 kg | (Poland) Krzysztof Kulak | def. | (Armenia) Ishkhan Zakharian | Submission (Rear-Naked Choke) | 1 | Tournament Quarter-Finals 1 |

=== KSW 8 Tournament Bracket ===
Quarterfinals
(Poland) Krzysztof Kulak | SUB
(Armenia) Ishkhan Zakharian | 1r.
(Netherlands) Andre Fyeet | SUB
(Poland) Jan Błachowicz | 1r.
(Poland) Karol Bedorf | UD
(France) Francis Carmont | 3r.
(Ukraine) Alexey Oleinik | SUB
(Poland) Lukasz Wos | 1r.

Semifinals
(Poland) Krzysztof Kulak | SUB
(Netherlands) Andre Fyeet | 3r.
(Poland) Karol Bedorf | 1r.
(Ukraine) Alexey Oleinik | SUB

Finals
(Poland) Krzysztof Kulak | 1r.
(Ukraine) Alexey Oleinik | SUB
