= 2005 in Konfrontacja Sztuk Walki =

Mixed martial arts events

Information
- First date: January 15, 2005
- Last date: September 10, 2005

Events
- Total events: 2

Fights
- Total fights: 16

Chronology
2004 in KSW	2005 in Konfrontacja Sztuk Walki	2006 in KSW

The year 2005 was the second year in the history of the Konfrontacja Sztuk Walki, a mixed martial arts promotion based in Poland. In 2005 Konfrontacja Sztuk Walki held 2 events beginning with, KSW III: Konfrontacja.

== List of events ==
#	Event Title	Date	Arena	Location
1	KSW III: Konfrontacja	January 15, 2005	Hotel Marriott	Warsaw, Poland
2	KSW IV: Konfrontacja	September 10, 2005	Hotel Marriott	Warsaw, Poland

== KSW III: Konfrontacja ==
KSW III: Konfrontacja
- Promotion: Konfrontacja Sztuk Walki
- Date: January 15, 2005
- Venue: Hotel Marriott
- City: Warsaw, Poland

Event chronology
KSW 2	KSW III: Konfrontacja	KSW 4

KSW III: Konfrontacja was a mixed martial arts event held on January 15, 2005, at the Hotel Marriott in Warsaw, Poland.

=== Results ===
Fight Card
Weight Class				Method	Round	Notes
Light Heavyweight 93 kg	(Poland) Antoni Chmielewski	def.	(Poland) Łukasz Jurkowski	Submission (Ezekiel Choke)	1	Tournament Final
Light Heavyweight 93 kg	(Poland) Przemysław Biskup	def.	(Lithuania) Marius Skyrius	Decision (Unanimous)	3	Tournament Alternate
Light Heavyweight 93 kg	(Poland) Łukasz Jurkowski	def.	(Poland) Marcin Zontek	Decision (Unanimous)	2	Tournament Semi-Finals 2
Light Heavyweight 93 kg	(Poland) Antoni Chmielewski	def.	(Poland) Jacek Buczko	(Cancelled) Buczko sustained a Hand Injury		Tournament Semi-Finals 1
Light Heavyweight 93 kg	(Belarus) Andrey Gerasimchuk	def.	(Lithuania) Remigijus Ziausys	Submission (Armbar)	1	Tournament Alternate
Light Heavyweight 93 kg	(Poland) Antoni Chmielewski	def.	(Poland) Michal Chmielewski	Submission (Toe Hold)	1	Tournament Quarter-Finals 4
Light Heavyweight 93 kg	(Poland) Łukasz Jurkowski	def.	(Lithuania) Sergej Razvadovskij	Submission (Kimura)	1	Tournament Quarter-Finals 3
Light Heavyweight 93 kg	(Poland) Marcin Zontek	def.	(Poland) Slawomir Zieba	TKO (Submission to punches)	3	Tournament Quarter-Finals 2
Light Heavyweight 93 kg	(Poland) Jacek Buczko	def.	(Poland) Łukasz Chlewicki	Decision (Unanimous)	3	Tournament Quarter-Finals 1

=== KSW 3 Tournament Bracket ===
Quarterfinals
(Poland) Jacek Buczko	UD
(Poland) Łukasz Chlewicki	3r.
(Poland) Antoni Chmielewski	SUB
(Poland) Michał Chmielewski	1r.
(Poland) Łukasz Jurkowski	SUB
(Lithuania) Sergey Razvadovskiy	1r.
(Poland) Marcin Zontek	SUB
(Poland) Sławomir Zięba	3r.

Semifinals
(Poland) Jacek Buczko	BYE
(Poland) Antoni Chmielewski
(Poland) Łukasz Jurkowski	UD
(Poland) Marcin Zontek	2r.

Finals
(Poland) Antoni Chmielewski	SUB
(Poland) Łukasz Jurkowski	1r.

== KSW IV: Konfrontacja ==
KSW IV: Konfrontacja
- Promotion: Konfrontacja Sztuk Walki
- Date: September 10, 2005
- Venue: Hotel Marriott
- City: Warsaw, Poland

Event chronology
KSW 3	KSW IV: Konfrontacja	KSW 5

KSW IV: Konfrontacja was a mixed martial arts event held on September 10, 2005, at the Hotel Marriott in Warsaw, Poland. Mirko Cro Cop was a special guest during the event.

=== Results ===
Fight Card
Weight Class				Method	Round	Notes
Light Heavyweight 93 kg	(Poland) Jacek Buczko	def.	(Croatia) Damir Mirenic	Decision (Unanimous)	3	Tournament Final
Light Heavyweight 93 kg	(Poland) Łukasz Jurkowski	def.	(Croatia) Igor Pokrajac	TKO (Retirement)	2
Light Heavyweight 93 kg	(Croatia) Damir Mirenic	def.	(United States) Jason Guida	Decision (Unanimous)	3	Tournament Semi-Finals 2
Light Heavyweight 93 kg	(Poland) Jacek Buczko	def.	(Belarus) Vladimir Yushko	Decision (Unanimous)	3	Tournament Semi-Finals 1
Light Heavyweight 93 kg	(Croatia) Damir Mirenic	def.	(Brazil) Carlos Eduardo	KO (Punch)	2	Tournament Quarter-Finals 4
Light Heavyweight 93 kg	(United States) Shonie Carter	def.	(Poland) Marcin Zontek	Decision (Unanimous)	1	Tournament Quarter-Finals 3
Light Heavyweight 93 kg	(Belarus) Vladimir Yushko	def.	(Poland) Antoni Chmielewski	Decision (Unanimous)	3	Tournament Quarter-Finals 2
Light Heavyweight 93 kg	(Poland) Jacek Buczko	def.	(United States) Jason Guida	Decision (Unanimous)	3	Tournament Quarter-Finals 1

=== KSW 4 Tournament Bracket ===
Quarterfinals
(Poland) Jacek Buczko	UD
(United States) Jason Guida	3r.
(Belarus) Vladimir Yushko	UD
(Poland) Antoni Chmielewski	3r.
(United States) Shonie Carter	UD
(Poland) Marcin Zontek	2r.
(Croatia) Damir Mirenic	KO
(Brazil) Carlos Eduardo	2r.

Semifinals
(Poland) Jacek Buczko	UD
(Belarus) Vladimir Yushko	3r.
(United States) Jason Guida*	3r.
(Croatia) Damir Mirenic	UD

Finals
(Poland) Jacek Buczko	UD
(Croatia) Damir Mirenic	3r.

*Jason Guida stepped in semi final due to Shonie Carter unable to compete due to injury.

== See also ==
- Konfrontacja Sztuk Walki
