= 2012 in Konfrontacja Sztuk Walki =

Mixed martial arts events

Information
- First date: February 25, 2012
- Last date: December 1, 2012

Events
- Total events: 4

Fights
- Total fights: 28
- Title fights: 5

Chronology
2011 in KSW	2012 in Konfrontacja Sztuk Walki	2013 in KSW

The year 2012 was the ninth year in the history of the Konfrontacja Sztuk Walki, a mixed martial arts promotion based in Poland. In 2012 Konfrontacja Sztuk Walki held 4 events beginning with, KSW 18: Unfinished Sympathy.

== List of events ==
#	Event title	Date	Arena	Location
1	KSW 18: Unfinished Sympathy	February 25, 2012	Orlen Arena	Płock, Poland
2	KSW 19: Pudzianowski vs. Sapp	May 12, 2012	Arena Łódź	Łódź, Poland
3	KSW 20: Fighting Symphonies	September 15, 2012	Ergo Arena	Gdańsk, Poland
4	KSW 21: Ultimate Explanation	December 1, 2012	Hala Torwar	Warsaw, Poland

== Title fights ==
Title fights in 2012
#	Weight Class				Method	Round	Time	Event	Notes
1	Middleweight 84 kg	(Poland) Michał Materla	def.	(Angola) Jay Silva	Decision (Majority)	3	KSW 19	For the vacant KSW Middleweight Championship	
2	Light Heavyweight 93 kg	(Poland) Jan Błachowicz (c)	def.	(United States) Houston Alexander	Decision (Unanimous)	3	KSW 20	For the KSW Light Heavyweight Championship	
3	Lightweight 70 kg	(Poland) Maciej Jewtuszko	def.	(Poland) Artur Sowiński	Submission (brabo choke)	2	KSW 21	For the Inaugural KSW Lightweight Championship	
4	Welterweight 77 kg	(Poland) Aslambek Saidov	def.	(Poland) Borys Mańkowski	TKO (leg injury)	2	KSW 21	For the Inaugural KSW Welterweight Championship.	
5	Middleweight 84 kg	(Poland) Michał Materla (c)	def.	(United States) Rodney Wallace	KO (punch)	1	KSW 21	For the KSW Middleweight Championship	

== KSW 18: Unfinished Sympathy ==
KSW 18: Unfinished Sympathy
- Promotion: Konfrontacja Sztuk Walki
- Date: February 25, 2012
- Venue: Orlen Arena
- City: Płock, Poland

Event chronology
KSW 17	KSW 18: Unfinished Sympathy	KSW 19

KSW 18: Unfinished Sympathy was a mixed martial arts event held on February 25, 2012 at the Orlen Arena in Płock, Poland.

=== Background ===
The original main event of Jan Błachowicz fighting Dave Branch was changed when Branch had passport issues in the days leading up to the event. He was replaced by Mario Miranda.

Marcin Różalski was initially scheduled to face Jerome Le Banner in a non-main event fight. However, a knee injury forced Le Banner off the card and with only two days notice Valentijn Overeem stepped in as a replacement.

=== Results ===
Fight Card
Weight Class				Method	Round	Notes
Heavyweight 120 kg	(Netherlands) Valentijn Overeem	def.	(Poland) Marcin Różalski	Submission (Heel Hook)	1
Light Heavyweight 93 kg	(Poland) Jan Błachowicz	def.	(Brazil) Mario Miranda	Decision (Unanimous)	3
Lightweight 70 kg	(England) Curt Warburton	def.	(Poland) Artur Sowiński	Submission (Arm-Triangle Choke)	2
Lightweight 70 kg	(Poland) Maciej Jewtuszko	def.	(England) Dean Amasinger	TKO (Punches)	1
Heavyweight 120 kg	(Poland) Karol Bedorf	def.	(United States) David Oliva	Decision (Unanimous)	2
Heavyweight 120 kg	(Poland) Kamil Walus	def.	(Poland) Kamil Bazelak	TKO (Punches)	1
Lightweight 70 kg	(Russia) Anzor Azhiev	def.	(Germany) Cengiz Dana	Decision (Unanimous)	2

== KSW 19: Pudzianowski vs. Sapp ==
KSW 19: Pudzianowski vs. Sapp
- Promotion: Konfrontacja Sztuk Walki
- Date: May 12, 2012
- Venue: Arena Łódź
- City: Łódź, Poland

Event chronology
KSW 18	KSW 19: Pudzianowski vs. Sapp	KSW 20

KSW 19: Pudzianowski vs. Sapp was a mixed martial arts event held on May 12, 2012 at the Atlas Arena in Łódź, Poland.

=== Background ===
The main event featured former World's Strongest Man Mariusz Pudzianowski facing Bob Sapp.

Also on the card was the first ever women's bout in KSW history when Marta Chojnoska fought Paulina Suska in a 55 kilograms (121 lb) catchweight bout.

The vacant KSW Middleweight Championship was given to the winner of Michał Materla and Jay Silva.

=== Results ===
Fight Card
Weight Class				Method	Round	Notes
Heavyweight 120 kg	(Poland) Mariusz Pudzianowski	def.	(United States) Bob Sapp	TKO (Punches)	1
Middleweight 84 kg	(Poland) Mamed Khalidov	def.	(United States) Rodney Wallace	KO (Punch)	1
Middleweight 84 kg	(Poland) Michał Materla	def.	(Angola) Jay Silva	Decision (Majority)	3	For the vacant KSW Middleweight Championship.
Middleweight 84 kg	(United States) Matt Horwich	def.	(Poland) Antoni Chmielewski	TKO (Punches)	3
Welterweight 77 kg	(Russia) Aslambek Saidov	def.	(Armenia) Grigor Aschugbabjan	Submission (Kimura)	1
Female Catchweight 55 kg	(Poland) Marta Chojnoska	def.	(Poland) Paulina Suska	Submission (Scarf Hold Armlock)	1	Female Tournament Semi-Finals
Welterweight 77 kg	(Poland) Borys Mankowski	def.	(Poland) Marcin Naruszczka	Decision (Majority)	2

== KSW 20: Fighting Symphonies ==
KSW 20: Fighting Symphonies
- Promotion: Konfrontacja Sztuk Walki
- Date: September 15, 2012
- Venue: Ergo Arena
- City: Gdańsk, Poland

Event chronology
KSW 19	KSW 20: Fighting Symphonies	KSW 21

KSW 20: Fighting Symphonies was a mixed martial arts event held on September 15, 2012 at the Ergo Arena in Gdańsk, Poland.

=== Background ===
The event featured Jan Błachowicz defending the Light Heavyweight Championship against Houston Alexander.

The Różalski-Le Banner bout was originally scheduled for KSW 18, however Le Banner was forced to withdraw due to an injured knee. Le Banner was again forced out of this bout due to injury and was replaced by Rodney Glunder.

=== Results ===
Fight Card
Weight Class				Method	Round	Notes
Heavyweight 120 kg	(Poland) Mariusz Pudzianowski	def.	(United States) Christos Piliafas	TKO (Punches)	1
Light Heavyweight 93 kg	(Poland) Jan Błachowicz (c)	def.	(United States) Houston Alexander	Decision (Unanimous)	3	For the KSW Light Heavyweight Championship.
Heavyweight 120 kg	(Poland) Marcin Rozalski	def.	(Netherlands) Rodney Glunder	Decision (Unanimous)	3
Heavyweight 120 kg	(Poland) Karol Bedorf	def.	(United States) Karl Knothe	Decision (Unanimous)	3
Welterweight 77 kg	(Poland) Borys Mankowski	def.	(Poland) Rafal Moks	Decision (Unanimous)	3
Heavyweight 120 kg	(Poland) Kamil Walus	def.	(Poland) Jacek Wisniewski	TKO (Punches)	1
Lightweight 70 kg	(Russia) Anzor Azhiev	def.	(Scotland) Paul Reed	Decision (Unanimous)	3

== KSW 21: Ultimate Explanation ==
KSW 21: Ultimate Explanation
- Promotion: Konfrontacja Sztuk Walki
- Date: December 1, 2012
- Venue: Hala Torwar
- City: Warsaw, Poland

Event chronology
KSW 20	KSW 21: Ultimate Explanation	KSW 22

KSW 21: Ultimate Explanation was a mixed martial arts event held on December 1, 2012 at the Hala Torwar in Warsaw, Poland.

=== Background ===
It was KSW comeback to Warsaw after two years with no events in capital city of Poland.

Mamed Khalidov was expected to fight Melvin Manhoef in the main event. However, Manhoef suffered an injury to his left leg and pulled out of the bout. Kendall Grove stepped in to fight Khalidov.

=== Results ===
Fight Card
Weight Class				Method	Round	Notes
Middleweight 84 kg	(Poland) Mamed Khalidov	def.	(United States) Kendall Grove	Submission (Achilles Lock)	2
Middleweight 84 kg	(Poland) Michał Materla (c)	def.	(United States) Rodney Wallace	KO (punch)	1	For the KSW Middleweight Championship.
Welterweight 77 kg	(Poland) Aslambek Saidov	def.	(Poland) Borys Mańkowski	TKO (leg injury)	2	For the Inaugural KSW Welterweight Championship.
Lightweight 70 kg	(Poland) Maciej Jewtuszko	def.	(Poland) Artur Sowiński	Submission (brabo choke)	2	For the Inaugural KSW Lightweight Championship.
Middleweight 84 kg	(Poland) Piotr Strus	def.	(Poland) Krzysztof Kułak	TKO (retirement)	2
Female Catchweight 55 kg	(Poland) Karolina Kowalkiewicz	def.	(Poland) Paulina Bońkowska	Decision (Unanimous)	2	Female Tournament Semi-Finals
Middleweight 84 kg	(United States) Matt Horwich	def.	(United States) Terry Martin	TKO (punches)	2
