= 2004 in Konfrontacja Sztuk Walki =

Mixed martial arts events

Information
- First date: February 27, 2004
- Last date: October 7, 2004

Events
- Total events: 2

Fights
- Total fights: 14

Chronology
2004 in Konfrontacja Sztuk Walki	2005 in KSW

The year 2004 was the first year in the history of the Konfrontacja Sztuk Walki, a mixed martial arts promotion based in Poland. In 2004 Konfrontacja Sztuk Walki held 2 events beginning with, KSW I: Konfrontacja.

== List of events ==
#	Event title	Date	Arena	Location
1	KSW I: Konfrontacja	February 27, 2004	Hotel Marriott	Warsaw, Poland
2	KSW II: Konfrontacja	October 7, 2004	Hotel Marriott	Warsaw, Poland

== KSW I: Konfrontacja ==
KSW I: Konfrontacja
- Promotion: Konfrontacja Sztuk Walki
- Date: February 27, 2004
- Venue: Hotel Marriott
- City: Warsaw, Poland
- Attendance: 300

Event chronology
KSW I: Konfrontacja	KSW 2

'KSW I: Konfrontacja' was a mixed martial arts event held on February 27, 2004 at the Hotel Marriott in Warsaw, Poland .

=== Results ===
Fight Card
Weight Class				Method	Round	Notes
Light Heavyweight 93 kg	(Poland) Łukasz Jurkowski	def.	(Poland) Roman Szaszkow	TKO (Submission to punches)	1	Tournament Final
Light Heavyweight 93 kg	(Poland) Roman Szaszkow	def.	(Poland) Pawel Trzesniewski	Submission (Armbar)	1	Tournament Semi-Finals 2
Light Heavyweight 93 kg	(Poland) Łukasz Jurkowski	def.	(Poland) Benedykt Stepien	Decision (unanimous)	2	Tournament Semi-Finals 1
Light Heavyweight 93 kg	(Poland) Roman Szaszkow	def.	(Poland) Norbert Swierblewski	Submission (Achilles Lock)	1	Tournament Quarter-Finals 4
Light Heavyweight 93 kg	(Poland) Benedykt Stepien	def.	(Poland) Emiliusz Ręgiel	Submission (Armbar)	1	Tournament Quarter-Finals 3
Light Heavyweight 93 kg	(Poland) Łukasz Jurkowski	def.	(Poland) Rafal Tomasiuk	Submission (Rear-Naked Choke)	1	Tournament Quarter-Finals 2
Light Heavyweight 93 kg	(Poland) Paweł Trześniewski	def.	(Poland) Marek Piechotka	(Cancelled) Piechotka Injured		Tournament Quarter-Finals 1

=== KSW 1 Tournament Bracket ===
Quarterfinals
(Poland) Łukasz Jurkowski	SUB
(Poland) Rafał Tomasiuk	1r.
(Poland) Benedykt Stępień	SUB
(Poland) Emiliusz Regiel	1r.
(Poland) Roman Szaszkow	SUB
(Poland) Norbert Świerblewski	1r.
(Poland) Paweł Trzaśniewski
(Poland) Marek Piechotka	BYE

Semifinals
(Poland) Łukasz Jurkowski	UD
(Poland) Benedykt Stępień	2r.
(Poland) Roman Szaszkow	SUB
(Poland) Paweł Trzaśniewski	1r.

Finals
(Poland) Łukasz Jurkowski	TKO
(Poland) Roman Szaszkow	1r.

== KSW II: Konfrontacja ==
KSW II: Konfrontacja
- Promotion: Konfrontacja Sztuk Walki
- Date: October 7, 2004
- Venue: Hotel Marriott
- City: Warsaw, Poland

Event chronology
KSW 1	KSW II: Konfrontacja	KSW 3

KSW II: Konfrontacja was a mixed martial arts event held on October 7, 2004 at the Hotel Marriott in Warsaw, Poland.

=== Results ===
Fight Card
Weight Class				Method	Round	Notes
Light Heavyweight 93 kg	(Poland) Antoni Chmielewski	def.	(Poland) Łukasz Jurkowski	Submission (Armbar)	1	Tournament Final
Light Heavyweight 93 kg	(Poland) Michal Chmielewski	def.	(Poland) Igor Kolacin	Submission (Rear-Naked Choke)	2
Light Heavyweight 93 kg	(Poland) Łukasz Jurkowski	def.	(Poland) Tomasz Stanclik	Submission (Rear-Naked Choke)	3	Tournament Semi-Finals 2
Light Heavyweight 93 kg	(Poland) Antoni Chmielewski	def.	(Poland) Krzysztof Mila	Submission (Armbar)	2	Tournament Semi-Finals 1
Light Heavyweight 93 kg	(Poland) Łukasz Jurkowski	def.	(Poland) Pawel Zalewski	KO (Head Kick)	1	Tournament Quarter-Finals 4
Light Heavyweight 93 kg	(Poland) Krzysztof Mila	def.	(Ukraine) Yuri Pilipchuk	Submission (Armbar)	1	Tournament Quarter-Finals 3
Light Heavyweight 93 kg	(Poland) Tomasz Stanclik	def.	(Poland) Artur Zajac	Submission (Guillotine Choke)	1	Tournament Quarter-Finals 2
Light Heavyweight 93 kg	(Poland) Antoni Chmielewski	def.	(Poland) Norbert Swierblewski	Submission (Armbar)	1	Tournament Quarter-Finals 1

=== KSW 2 Tournament Bracket ===
Quarterfinals
(Poland) Antoni Chmielewski	SUB
(Poland) Norbert Swierblewski	1r.
(Poland) Krzysztof Mila	SUB
(Ukraine) Yuri Pilipchuk	1r.
(Poland) Tomasz Stanclik	SUB
(Poland) Artur Zajac	1r.
(Poland) Łukasz Jurkowski	KO
(Poland) Pawel Zalewski	1r.

Semifinals
(Poland) Antoni Chmielewski	SUB
(Poland) Krzysztof Mila	2r.
(Poland) Tomasz Stanclik	3r.
(Poland) Łukasz Jurkowski	SUB

Finals
(Poland) Antoni Chmielewski	SUB
(Poland) Łukasz Jurkowski	1r.

== See also ==
- Konfrontacja Sztuk Walki
