= 2013 in Konfrontacja Sztuk Walki =

Mixed martial arts events

Information
- First date: March 16, 2013
- Last date: December 7, 2013

Events
- Total events: 4

Fights
- Title fights: 5

Chronology
2012 in KSW	2013 in Konfrontacja Sztuk Walki	2014 in KSW

The year 2013 was the tenth year in the history of the Konfrontacja Sztuk Walki, a mixed martial arts promotion based in Poland. In 2014 Konfrontacja Sztuk Walki held 4 events beginning with, KSW 22: Pride Time .

== List of events ==
#	Event title	Date	Arena	Location
1	KSW 22: Pride Time	March 16, 2013	Torwar Hall	Warsaw, Poland
2	KSW 23: Khalidov vs. Manhoef	June 8, 2013	Ergo Arena	Gdańsk, Poland
3	KSW 24: Clash of the Giants	September 28, 2013	Atlas Arena	Łódź, Poland
4	KSW 25: Khalidov vs. Sakurai 2	December 8, 2013	Centennial Hall	Wrocław, Poland

== Title fights ==
Title fights in 2013
#	Weight Class				Method	Round	Time	Event	Notes
1	Lightheavyweight 93 kg	(Poland) Jan Błachowicz (c)	def.	(Croatia) Goran Reljic	Decision (unanimous)	3	5:00	KSW 22	For the KSW Light Heavyweight Championship.
2	Female 55 kg	(Poland) Karolina Kowalkiewicz	def.	(Poland) Marta Chojnoska	Submission (Rear-naked Choke)	1	1:11	KSW 23	For the Inaugural KSW Women's Strawweight Championship
3	Middleweight 84 kg	(Poland) Michał Materla	def.	(United States) Kendall Grove	TKO (Punches)	4	5:00	KSW 23	For the KSW Middleweight Championship
4	Heavyweight 120 kg	(Poland) Karol Bedorf	def.	(Poland) Paweł Nastula	KO (Punches)	2	2:25	KSW 24	For the Inaugural KSW Heavyweight Championship
5	Welterweight 77 kg	(Poland) Aslambek Saidov (c)	def.	(Brazil) Daniel Acácio	TKO (punches)	3	5:00	KSW 25	For the KSW Welterweight Championship

== KSW 22: Pride Time ==
KSW 22: Pride Time
- Promotion: Konfrontacja Sztuk Walki
- Date: March 16, 2013
- Venue: Hala Torwar
- City: Warsaw, Poland

Event chronology
KSW 21	KSW 22: Pride Time	KSW 23

KSW 22: Pride Time was held at the Hala Torwar in Warsaw, Poland on March 16, 2013.

=== Background ===
The main event featured Polish standout Jan Błachowicz defending his Light Heavyweight Championship against UFC veteran Goran Reljic.

=== Results ===
Fight Card
Weight Class				Method	Round	Notes
Lightheavyweight 93 kg	(Poland) Jan Błachowicz (c)	def.	(Croatia) Goran Reljic	Decision (unanimous)	3	For the KSW Light Heavyweight Championship.
Heavyweight 120 kg	(Poland) Pawel Nastula	def.	(United States) Kevin Asplund	Submission (Keylock)	1
Heavyweight 120 kg	(Poland) Karol Bedorf	def.	(England) Oli Thompson	Decision (unanimous)	3
Featherweight 66 kg	(Russia) Anzor Azhiev	def.	(Czech Republic) Pavel Svoboda	KO (punches)	1
Middleweight 84 kg	(Turkey) Aziz Karaoglu	def.	(Poland) Piotr Strus	KO (punches)	1
Welterweight 77 kg	(Poland) Rafal Moks	def.	(Poland) Marcin Naruszczka	Submission (guillotine choke)	1
Heavyweight 120 kg	(Poland) Kamil Walus	def.	(United States) Christos Piliafas	TKO (Submission to punches)	1

== KSW 23: Khalidov vs. Manhoef ==
KSW 23: Khalidov vs. Manhoef
- Promotion: Konfrontacja Sztuk Walki
- Date: June 8, 2013
- Venue: Ergo Arena
- City: Gdańsk, Poland

Event chronology
KSW 22	KSW 23: Khalidov vs. Manhoef	KSW 24

KSW 23: Khalidov vs Manhoef was a mixed martial arts event held on June 8, 2013, at the Ergo Arena in Gdańsk, Poland.

=== Background ===
Konfrontacja Sztuk Walki's first Women's Champion was crowned at this event.

This was the first event available through ksw.tv outside of Poland.

=== Results ===
Fight Card
Weight Class				Method	Round	Time	Notes
Middleweight 84 kg	(Poland) Mamed Khalidov	def.	(Netherlands) Melvin Manhoef	Submission (Guillotine Choke)	1	2:09	
Heavyweight 120 kg	(United States) Sean McCorkle	def.	(Poland) Mariusz Pudzianowski	Submission (Kimura)	1	1:57	
Middleweight 84 kg	(Poland) Michał Materla (c)	def.	(United States) Kendall Grove	Decision (Unanimous - Extra Round)	4	5:00	For the KSW Middleweight Championship.
Welterweight 77 kg	(Poland) Aslambek Saidov	def.	(United States) Ben Lagman	Submission (Armbar)	2	4:22	
Female 55 kg	(Poland) Karolina Kowalkiewicz	def.	(Poland) Marta Chojnoska	Submission (Rear-naked Choke)	1	1:11	For the Inaugural KSW Women's Strawweight Championship.
Lightweight 70 kg	(Poland) Mateusz Gamrot	def.	(Poland) Mateusz Zawadzki	TKO (Corner Stoppage)	2	5:00	
Welterweight 77 kg	(Brazil) Luiz Ricardo Simon	def.	(Poland) Mateusz Piskorz	Decision (Unanimous)	3	5:00	

== KSW 24: Clash of the Giants ==
KSW 24: Clash of the Giants
- Promotion: Konfrontacja Sztuk Walki
- Date: September 28, 2013
- Venue: Atlas Arena
- City: Łódź, Poland
- Attendance: 13,000

Event chronology
KSW 23	KSW 24: Clash of the Giants	KSW 25

KSW 24: Clash of the Giants was a mixed martial arts event held on September 28, 2013 at the Atlas Arena in Łódź, Poland.

=== Background ===
The main event saw Mariusz Pudzianowski against Sean McCorkle in a rematch.

The event also crowned the first heavyweight champion in a match between Pawel Nastula and Karol Bedorf. The event also featured a rematch between Michał Materla and Jay Silva in the middleweight division. Mateusz Gamrot replaced current lightweight champion Maciej Jewtuszko as UFC veteran Andre Winner's opponent.

=== Results ===
Fight Card
Weight Class				Method	Round	Time	Notes
Heavyweight 120 kg	(Poland) Mariusz Pudzianowski	def.	(United States) Sean McCorkle	Decision (Unanimous)	2	5:00	
Heavyweight 120 kg	(Poland) Karol Bedorf	def.	(Poland) Paweł Nastula	TKO (Retirement)	2	2:25	For the Inaugural KSW Heavyweight Championship.
Middleweight 84 kg	(Angola) Jay Silva	def.	(Poland) Michał Materla (c)	KO (punches)	2	0:50	Non-Title fight
Welterweight 77 kg	(Poland) Borys Mankowski	def.	(United States) Ben Lagman	TKO (punches)	2	2:16	
Female 54 kg	(Poland) Karolina Kowalkiewicz (c)	def.	(Czech Republic) Simona Soukupova	Decision (Unanimous)	3	5:00	Non-Title fight
Heavyweight 120 kg	(Poland) Marcin Rozalski	def.	(Australia) Paul Slowinski	Submission (Rear-naked Choke)	1	4:32	
Featherweight 66 kg	(Russia) Anzor Azhiev		(Poland) Artur Sowiński	No Contest	1	1:54	Accidental clash of heads ended the fight
Lightweight 70 kg	(Poland) Mateusz Gamrot	def.	(England) Andre Winner	Decision (Unanimous)	3	5:00	

== KSW 25: Khalidov vs. Sakurai 2 ==
KSW 25: Khalidov vs. Sakurai 2
- Promotion: Konfrontacja Sztuk Walki
- Date: December 7, 2013
- Venue: Centennial Hall
- City: Wrocław, Poland

Event chronology
KSW 24	KSW 25: Khalidov vs. Sakurai 2	KSW 26

KSW 25: Khalidov vs. Sakurai 2 was a mixed martial arts event held on December 7, 2013 at the Centennial Hall, Wrocław, Poland.

=== Results ===
Fight Card
Weight Class				Method	Round	Time	Notes
Middleweight 84 kg	(Poland) Mamed Khalidov	def.	(Japan) Ryuta Sakurai	Submission (Triangle Choke)	1	2:03	
Welterweight 77 kg	(Russia) Aslambek Saidov (c)	def.	(Brazil) Daniel Acácio	Decision (Unanimous)	3	5:00	For the KSW Welterweight Championship.
Welterweight 77 kg	(Poland) Rafal Moks	def.	(Brazil) Luis Ricardo Simon	Submission (Guillotine Choke)	1	1:35	
Middleweight 84 kg	(Germany) Abu Azaitar	def.	(Poland) Krzysztof Kulak	TKO (Punches)	1	2:20	
Light Heavyweight 93 kg	(United States) Virgil Zwicker	def.	(United States) Mike Hayes	KO (Punch)	1	1:12	
Heavyweight 120 kg	(England) Oli Thompson	def.	(Poland) Kamil Walus	TKO (Punches)	2	1:24	
Middleweight 84 kg	(Poland) Piotr Strus	def.	(United States) Matt Horwich	Decision (Majority)	3	5:00	
Welterweight 77 kg	(Poland) Rafal Blachuta	def.	(Poland) Robert Radomski	Submission (Triangle Kimura)	2	1:26	
Lightweight 70 kg	(Poland) Jakub Kowalewicz	def.	(Poland) Mateusz Dubilowicz	TKO (Punches)	3	2:50	
