= 2008 in Konfrontacja Sztuk Walki =

Mixed martial arts events

Information
- First date: March 29, 2008
- Last date: December 12, 2008

Events
- Total events: 4

Fights
- Total fights: 43

Chronology
2007 in KSW	2008 in Konfrontacja Sztuk Walki	2009 in KSW

The year 2008 was the fifth year in the history of the Konfrontacja Sztuk Walki, a mixed martial arts promotion based in Poland. In 2008, Konfrontacja Sztuk Walki held 4 events beginning with, KSW Elimination II.

== List of events ==
#	Event title	Date	Arena	Location
1	KSW Elimination II	March 29, 2008	Hala Stulecia	Wrocław, Poland
2	KSW IX: Konfrontacja	May 9, 2008	Hala Torwar	Warsaw, Poland
3	KSW Extra	September 13, 2008	Hala Centrum	Dabrowa Górnicza, Poland
4	KSW 10: Dekalog	December 12, 2008	Hala Torwar	Warsaw, Poland

== KSW Elimination 2 ==
KSW Elimination II
- Promotion: Konfrontacja Sztuk Walki
- Date: March 29, 2008
- Venue: Hala Stulecia
- City: Wrocław, Poland
- Attendance: 3000

Event chronology
KSW 8	KSW Elimination II	KSW 9

KSW Elimination II was a mixed martial arts event held on March 29, 2008 at the Hala Stulecia in Warsaw, Poland.

=== Results ===
Fight Card
Weight Class				Method	Round	Notes
Light Heavyweight 95 kg	(Poland) Michal Fijalka	def.	(Poland) Sebastian Olchawa	Decision (Unanimous)	3	Tournament Final
Light Heavyweight 95 kg	(Poland) Mamed Khalidov	def.	(Czech Republic) Petr Ondrus	TKO (Hand Injury	2
Light Heavyweight 95 kg	(Poland) Krzysztof Kulak	def.	(Russia) Nikolai Onikienko	Decision (Unanimous)	2
Light Heavyweight 95 kg	(Poland) Michal Fijalka	def.	(Poland) Lech Zamorski	Submission (Kimura)	1	Tournament Semi-Finals 2
Light Heavyweight 95 kg	(Poland) Sebastian Olchawa	def.	(Poland) Tomasz Niedzwiecki	Submission (Rear-Naked Choke)	1	Tournament Semi-Finals 1
Catchweight 73 kg	(Poland) Maciej Gorski	def.	(Netherlands) Danny van Bergen	Submission (Armbar)	1
Light Heavyweight 95 kg	(Poland) Michal Fijalka	def.	(Poland) Arkadiusz Jedraczka	Submission (Keylock)	2	Tournament Quarter-Finals 4
Light Heavyweight 95 kg	(Poland) Lech Zamorski	def.	(Poland) Tomasz Macior	Submission (Armbar)	1	Tournament Quarter-Finals 3
Light Heavyweight 95 kg	(Poland) Sebastian Olchawa	def.	(Poland) Marek Kowalczyk	Decision (Unanimous)	2	Tournament Quarter-Finals 2
Light Heavyweight 95 kg	(Poland) Tomasz Niedzwiecki	def.	(Poland) Marcin Wójcik	TKO (Punches)	1	Tournament Quarter-Finals 1

=== KSW Elimination 2 Tournament Bracket ===
Quarterfinals
(Poland) Tomasz Niedzwiecki	TKO
(Poland) Marcin Wójcik	1r.
(Poland) Sebastian Olchawa	UD
(Poland) Marek Kowalczyk	3r.
(Poland) Lech Zamorski	SUB
(Poland) Tomasz Macior	1r.
(Poland) Michal Fijalka	SUB
(Poland) Arkadiusz Jedraczka	2r.

Semifinals
(Poland) Tomasz Niedzwiecki	1r.
(Poland) Sebastian Olchawa	SUB
(Poland) Lech Zamorski	1r.
(Poland) Michal Fijalka	SUB

Finals
(Poland) Sebastian Olchawa	3r.
(Poland) Michal Fijalka	UD

== KSW IX: Konfrontacja ==
KSW IX: Konfrontacja
- Promotion: Konfrontacja Sztuk Walki
- Date: May 9, 2008
- Venue: Hala Torwar
- City: Warsaw, Poland

Event chronology
KSW Elimination 2	KSW IX: Konfrontacja	KSW Extra

KSW IX: Konfrontacja was a mixed martial arts event on May 9, 2008 at the Hala Torwar in Warsaw, Poland.

=== Results ===
Fight Card
Weight Class				Method	Round	Notes
Light Heavyweight 95 kg	(Poland) Jan Błachowicz	def.	(Turkey) Aziz Karaoglu	Submission (Armbar)	1	Tournament Final
Light Heavyweight 95 kg	(Poland) Mamed Khalidov	def.	(Lithuania) Valdas Pocevicius	Submission (Guillotine Choke)	2
Light Heavyweight 93 kg	(Bulgaria) Jordan Radev	def.	(Poland) Grzegorz Jakubowski	Decision (Unanimous)	2
Light Heavyweight 93 kg	(Poland) Daniel Dowda	def.	(Turkey) Aziz Karaoglu	Decision (Unanimous)	1	Tournament Semi-Finals 2
Light Heavyweight 93 kg	(Poland) Jan Błachowicz	def.	(Poland) Antoni Chmielewski	Submission (Armbar)	1	Tournament Semi-Finals 1
Welterweight 77 kg	(Lithuania) Edvardas Norkeilunas	def.	(Poland) Maciej Gorski	Decision (Unanimous)	2
Light Heavyweight 93 kg	(Turkey) Aziz Karaoglu	def.	(Brazil) Vitor Nobrega	TKO (Punches and Knees)	2	Tournament Quarter-Finals 4
Light Heavyweight 93 kg	(Russia) Alexey Oleynik	def.	(Poland) Daniel Dowda	Decision (Unanimous)	2	Tournament Quarter-Finals 3
Light Heavyweight 93 kg	(Poland) Jan Błachowicz	def.	(Germany) Martin Zawada	Decision (Unanimous)	1	Tournament Quarter-Finals 2
Light Heavyweight 93 kg	(Poland) Antoni Chmielewski	def.	(Japan) Yusuke Masuda	Decision (Unanimous)	2	Tournament Quarter-Finals 1

=== KSW 9 Tournament Bracket ===
Quarterfinals
(Poland) Antoni Chmielewski	UD
(Japan) Yusuke Masuda	2r.
(Poland) Jan Błachowicz	UD
(Germany) Martin Zawada	2r.
(Russia) Alexey Oleynik	UD
(Poland) Daniel Dowda	2r.
(Turkey) Aziz Karaoglu	TKO
(Brazil) Vitor Nóbrega	1r.

Semifinals
(Poland) Antoni Chmielewski	2r.
(Poland) Jan Błachowicz	SUB
(Poland) Daniel Dowda	UD
(Turkey) Aziz Karaoglu	3r.

Finals
(Poland) Jan Błachowicz	SUB
(Turkey) Aziz Karaoglu	1r.

== KSW Extra ==
KSW Extra
- Promotion: Konfrontacja Sztuk Walki
- Date: September 13, 2008
- Venue: Hala Centrum
- City: Dabrowa Górnicza, Poland

Event chronology
KSW 9	KSW Extra	KSW 10

KSW Extra was a mixed martial arts event held on September 13, 2008 at the Hala Centrum in Dabrowa Górnicza, Poland.

=== Results ===
Fight Card
Weight Class				Method	Round	Notes
Lightweight 70 kg	(Poland) Maciej Gorski	def.	(Poland) Jedrzej Kubski	Decision (Unanimous)	2	Tournament Final
Light Heavyweight 95 kg	(Poland) Mamed Khalidov		(Spain) Daniel Tabera	DRAW	3
Light Heavyweight 95 kg	(Sweden) Alexander Gustafsson	def.	(Poland) Krzysztof Kulak	Decision (Unanimous)	2
Light Heavyweight 95 kg	(Poland) Jan Błachowicz	def.	(Democratic Republic of the Congo) Christian M'Pumbu	Submission (Armbar)	2
Light Heavyweight 93 kg	(Poland) Antoni Chmielewski	def.	(Czech Republic) Andre Reinders	KO (Punch)	1
Catchweight 100 kg	(France) Francis Carmont	def.	(Poland) Lukasz Jurkowski	Submission (Rear-Naked Choke)	1
Middleweight 84 kg	(Poland) Daniel Dowda	def.	(Slovenia) Marko Drmonjic	Decision (Unanimous)	3
Welterweight 77 kg	(Poland) Peter Sobotta	def.	(Poland) Kerim Abzailov	TKO (Punches)	3
Heavyweight 120 kg	(India) Satish Jamia	def.	(Poland) Mariusz Slotta	Decision (Unanimous)	2
Middleweight 84 kg	(Netherlands) Bruns Marschiano	def.	(Poland) Andrzej Kumor	Submission (Guillotine Choke)	2
Lightweight 70 kg	(Poland) Jedrzej Kubski	def.	(Poland) Zaurbek Muchaev	Decision (Unanimous)	2	Tournament Semi-Finals 2
Lightweight 70 kg	(Poland) Maciej Gorski	def.	(Poland) Mariusz Pioskowik	TKO (Punches)	2	Tournament Semi-Finals 1

=== KSW Extra Tournament Bracket ===
Semifinals
(Poland) Maciej Gorski	TKO
(Poland) Mariusz Pioskowik	2r.
(Poland) Jedrzej Kubski	UD
(Poland) Zaurbek Muchaev	2r.

Finals
(Poland) Maciej Gorski	UD
(Poland) Jedrzej Kubski	2r.

== KSW 10: Dekalog ==
KSW 10: Dekalog
- Promotion: Konfrontacja Sztuk Walki
- Date: December 12, 2008
- Venue: Hala Torwar
- City: Warsaw, Poland

Event chronology
KSW Extra	KSW 10: Dekalog	KSW 11

KSW 10: Dekalog was a mixed martial arts event held on December 12, 2008 at the Hala Torwar in Warsaw, Poland.

=== Results ===
Fight Card
Weight Class				Method	Round	Notes
Light Heavyweight 95 kg	(Netherlands) Dave Dalgliesh	def.	(Czech Republic) Petr Ondrus	KO (Punch)	1	Tournament Final
Light Heavyweight 95 kg	(Poland) Jan Błachowicz	def.	(Croatia) Maro Perak	Submission (Rear-Naked Choke)	2
Light Heavyweight 93 kg	(Poland) Krzysztof Kulak	def.	(Netherlands) Michael Knaap	Decision (Unanimous)	2
Light Heavyweight 93 kg	(Czech Republic) Petr Ondrus	def.	(Croatia) Matias Baric	KO (Knee)	1	Tournament Semi-Finals 2
Light Heavyweight 93 kg	(Netherlands) Dave Dalgliesh	def.	(Serbia) Aleksandar Radosavljevic	TKO (Doctor Stoppage)	1	Tournament Semi-Finals 1
Lightweight 70 kg	(Poland) Maciej Gorski	def.	(Slovenia) Bojan Kosednar	Decision (Unanimous)	3
Light Heavyweight 93 kg	(Poland) Antoni Chmielewski	def.	(Netherlands) Dion Staring	Submission (Armbar)	2
Light Heavyweight 93 kg	(Czech Republic) Petr Ondrus	def.	(Italy) Matteo Minonzio	Decision (Unanimous)	2	Tournament Quarter-Finals 4
Light Heavyweight 93 kg	(Poland) Michal Fijalka	def.	(Croatia) Matias Baric	Submission (Rear-Naked Choke)	2	Tournament Quarter-Finals 3
Light Heavyweight 93 kg	(Netherlands) Dave Dalgliesh	def.	(France) Antony Rea	TKO (Punches)	1	Tournament Quarter-Finals 2
Light Heavyweight 93 kg	(Serbia) Aleksandar Radosavljevic	def.	(Poland) Lukasz Wos	Decision (Unanimous)	2	Tournament Quarter-Finals 1

=== KSW 10 Tournament Bracket ===
Quarterfinals
(Serbia) Aleksandar Radosavljevic	UD
(Poland) Lukasz Wos	2r.
(Netherlands) Dave Dalgliesh	TKO
(France) Antony Rea	1r.
(Poland) Michal Fijalka	SUB
(Croatia) Matias Baric	2r.
(Czech Republic) Petr Ondrus	UD
(Italy) Matteo Minonzio	2r.

Semifinals
(Serbia) Aleksandar Radosavljevic	1r.
(Netherlands) Dave Dalgliesh	TKO
(Croatia) Matias Baric*	1r.
(Czech Republic) Petr Ondrus	TKO

Finals
(Netherlands) Dave Dalgliesh	TKO
(Czech Republic) Petr Ondrus	1r.

* Matias Baric stepped in semi final instead of Michal Fijalka due to hand injury.

== See also ==
- Konfrontacja Sztuk Walki
