= Chałubińskiego 8 =

Skyscraper in Warsaw, Poland

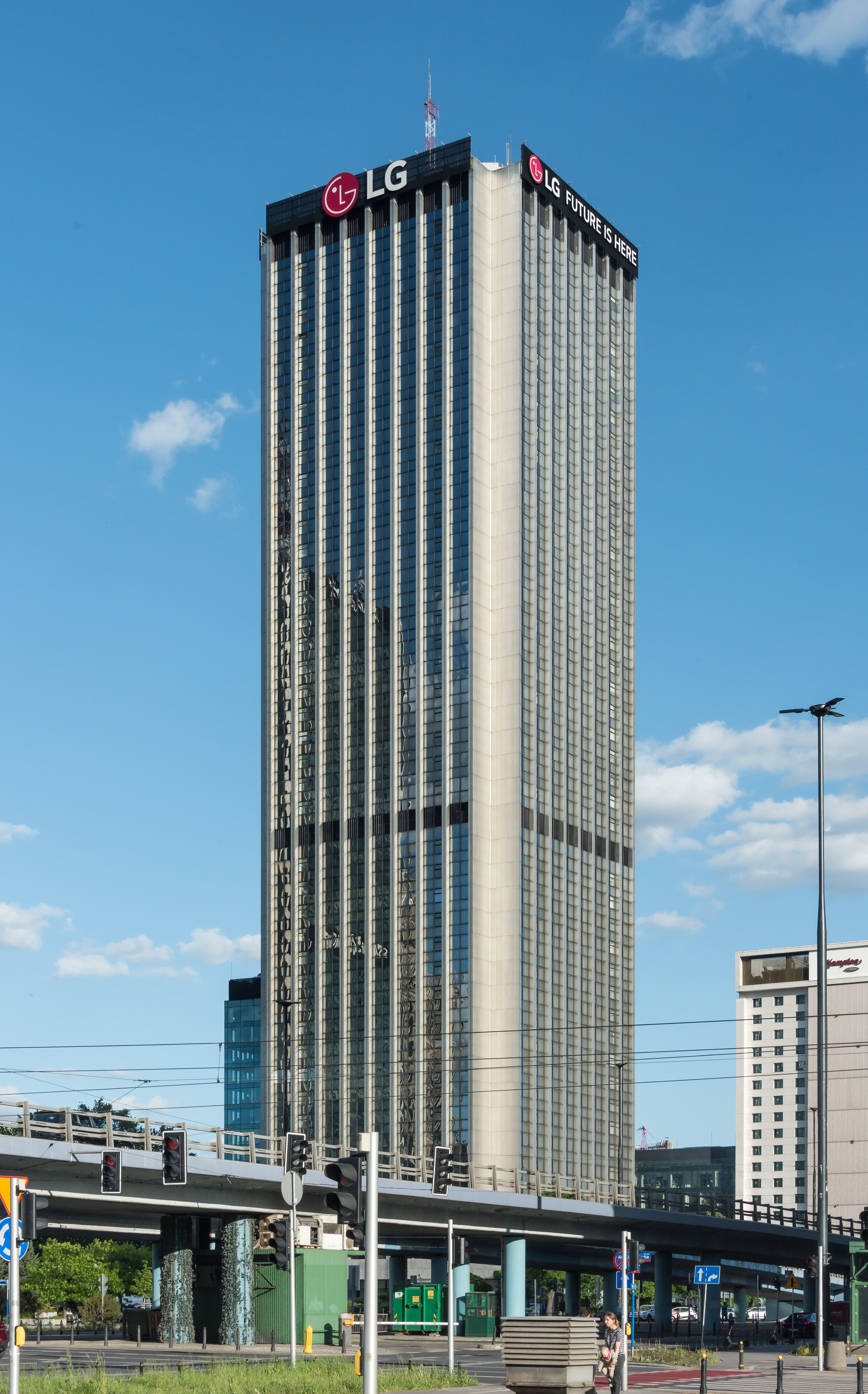
- The building in 2022.

General information
- Type: Skyscraper office building
- Architectural style: International Style
- Location: 8 Chałubińskiego Street, Downtown, Warsaw, Masovian Voivodeship, Poland
- Coordinates: 52°13′34″N 21°00′15″E
- Construction started: 1975
- Completed: 1978

Height
- Tip: 150 m (492.13 ft)
- Roof: 140 m (459.32 ft)

Technical details
- Floor count: 46 (+2 underground)
- Floor area: 70,000 m² (753,473.73 sq ft)

Design and construction
- Architects: Wojciech Grzybowski; Jerzy Janczak; Jerzy Skrzypczak; Halina Świergocka-Kaim; Jan Zdanowicz
- Main contractor: BPA Byggproduktion AB

Chałubińskiego 8 (Polish: [xa.wu.biɲˈskjɛ.ɡɔ ˈɔ.ɕɛm]; Ch8), formerly known as Intraco II, and Oxford Tower, is an International Style skyscraper office building in the city of Warsaw in Masovian Voivodeship, Poland. It is located at 8 Chałubińskiego Street, within the neighbourhood of South Downtown neighbourhood. The building was opened in 1978, and measures 140 m (459.32 ft) to the roof, and 150 m (492.13 ft) in its total height.

== History ==
Chałubińskiego 8 (originally known as Intraco II, and later as Oxford Tower) was designed in the International Style by Wojciech Grzybowski, Jerzy Janczak, Jerzy Skrzypczak, Halina Świergocka-Kaim, and Jan Zdanowicz. It was constructed between 1975 and 1978, by a Sweden-based company BPA Byggproduktion AB. It was built in the location of the Warsaw Pomological Garden, which was destroyed in 1944 during the Second World War. The skyscraber was envisioned as the headquarters of the commercial bank Bank Handlowy w Warszawie, and the international trade hub, as well as a part of the Western Wall, an architectural complex of offices and stores, which also includes the LIM Center. Upon its opening, it was the most technologically advanced, and second tallest building in the city, measuring 140 m (459.32 ft) to the roof, and 150 m (492.13 ft) in its total height.

In 2022, the building owner petitioned in the city hall for the permission expand it with the additional seven storeys, which extend its total height to 180 m (590.55 ft), as well as an additional tower, placed 20 m (65.62 ft) to its south.

== Architecture ==
The skyscraper features an International Style façade, and has 46 storeys, with an additional two floors underground. It measures 140 m (492.13 ft) in the height to the roof, and 150 m (492.13 ft) in its total architectural height. It has the total floor area of 70,000 m^{2} (753,473.73 sq ft). The building has twelve high-speed lifts. Together with the LIM Center, it forms the Western Wall, an architectural complex of stores and offices.
