= Michał Materla =

Polish mixed martial artist

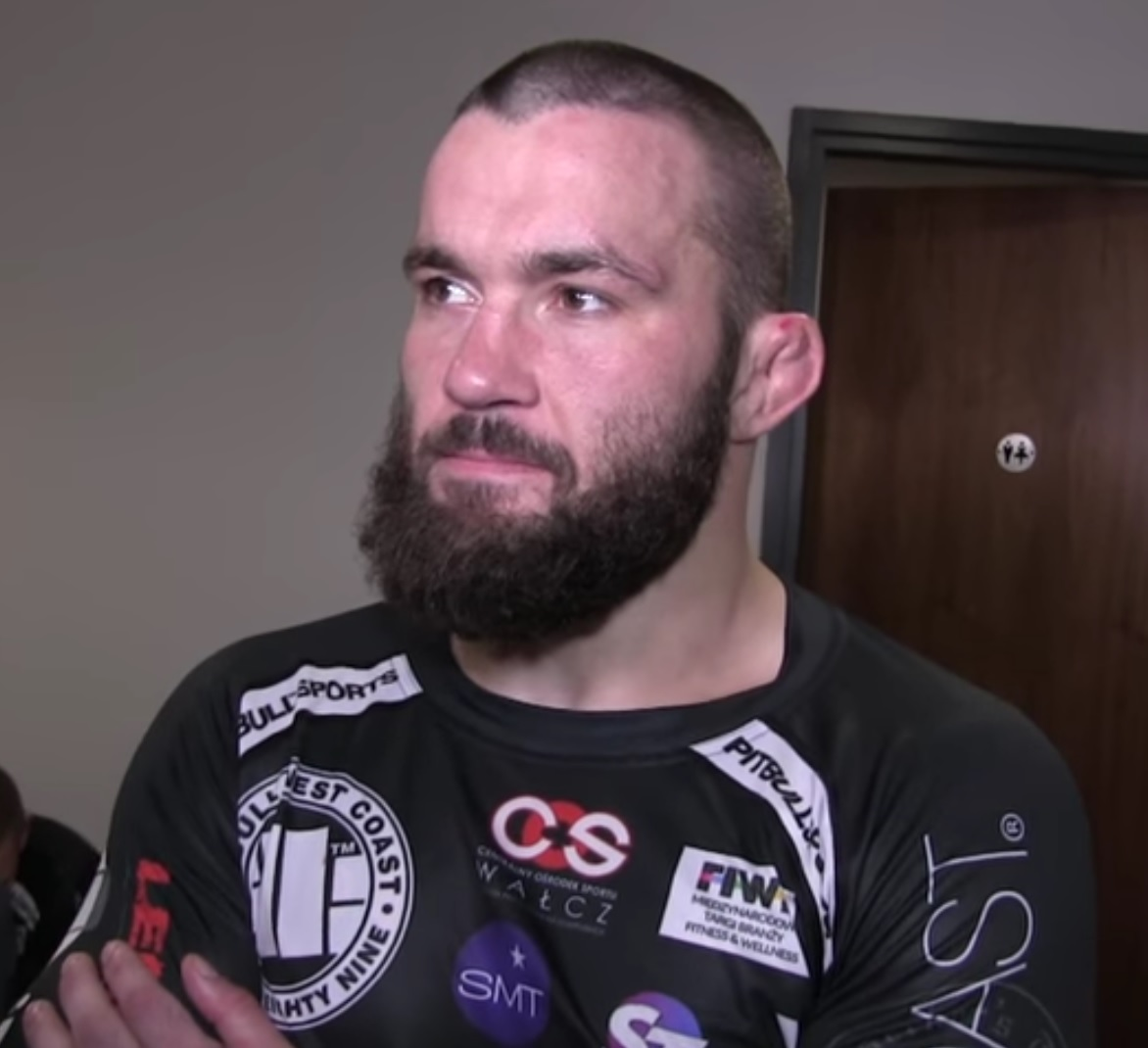
- Born: April 10, 1984 (age 42); Szczecin, Poland
- Other names: Cipao
- Nationality: Polish
- Height: 6 ft 0 in (1.83 m)
- Weight: 185 lb (84 kg; 13.2 st)
- Division: Heavyweight; Middleweight
- Reach: 75 in (190 cm)
- Team: Berserkers Team
- Years active: 2003–present

Mixed martial arts record
- Total: 44
- Wins: 33
- By knockout: 13
- By submission: 13
- By decision: 7
- Losses: 11
- By knockout: 8
- By decision: 3

Other information
- Mixed martial arts record from Sherdog

Michał Materla (born April 10, 1984) is a Polish mixed martial artist. He currently competes for the Oktagon MMA (OKTAGON). He is a former KSW Middleweight Champion.

== Background ==
Materla has been passionate about sports from a young age, starting with swimming for seven years and becoming the Polish Junior Champion. At the age of 14, he transitioned into triathlon training, where he enjoyed challenging workouts and excelled in swimming as a part of their cardio routine. Materla have fond memories of competing in regional triathlon competitions, even once finishing in fourth place despite losing his bike saddle during the race. Eventually, he moved on to combat sports, attending a camp in Brazil to learn mixed martial arts and Brazilian jiu-jitsu. Materla have found success in mixed martial arts, Brazilian jiu-jitsu, and submission wrestling.

== Mixed martial arts career ==
=== Early career ===
Materla began his career in mixed martial arts in 2003, in his debut match at the MMA Polska 2 Materla defeated Tomasz Janiszewski by guillotine. After defeating Andrzej Kulik via kimura, Materla went and amassed with 6–2 score in Europe promotions before joining Konfrontacja Sztuk Walki (KSW).

=== Konfrontacja Sztuk Walki ===
Materla made his KSW debut against Evert Fyeet at KSW VI: Konfrontacja as part of KSW VI tournament at middleweight. He won the fight via rear-naked choke. On the same night Materla submit Valdas Pocevicius in semi-finals and Krzysztof Kułak in finals in round one to win the tournament.

Materla next faced Jan Antoska at KSW VII: Konfrontacja on June 2, 2007, in Quarterfinals of VII tournament at middleweight. Materla won the bout via guillotine choke. Later at same event in semi-final of tournament Materla faced Antonio Mendes, he lost the bout via split decision.

Materla returned in KSW after four years, in 2011, against Gregory Babene at KSW 15: Konfrontacja. He won the bout after submitting Babene with a guillotine choke. Materla won his next two bouts against James Zikic and Matt Horwich, which earned him title shot for the vacant KSW Middleweight Championship.

Materla faced Jay Silva at KSW 19 on May 12, 2012. He won the bout and title via majority decision. Materla successfully defended his title against Rodney Wallace and Kendall Grove.

In a rematch, Materla faced Jay Silva in a non-title bout at KSW 24: Clash of the Giants on September 28, 2013. Materla lost the bout via KO in round two. Materla faced Jay Silva in a trilogy at KSW 26: Materla vs. Silva III. Materla won the bout via unanimous decision. In his next two bouts Materla knocked out Jorge Bezzer in non-title bout and defend his title against Tomasz Drwal.

Materla faced Mamed Khalidov at KSW 33: Materla vs. Khalidov. Materla lost the bout and title in first round after Khalidov stunned Materla with right hook and finished him with flying knee.

After losing his title, Materla faced Antoni Chmielewski at KSW 35: Khalidov vs. Karaoglu, where he knocked out Antoni in first round.

Materla faced Rousimar Palhares at KSW 36: Materla vs. Palhares on October 10, 2016. Materla won the bout via KO in round two.

On August 29, 2017, it was reported that Materla signed contract with Ultimate Fighting Championship (UFC) and was expected to face Thiago Santos at UFC Fight Night 118 on October 21, 2017. However, on September 1 it was revealed that Materla choose to re-sign with KSW and bout was scrapped.

Materla next faced Paulo Thiago at KSW 40: Dublin on October 22, 2017. He won the bout via TKO in second round.

Materla faced Scott Askham in March 2018 at KSW 42: Khalidov vs. Narkun. He lost the bout via TKO in round one.

After a win over Martin Zawada, Materla entered KSW Middleweight tournament and faced Damian Janikowski at KSW 45: The Return to Wembley. He won the bout via technical knockout.

Martela rematched with Scott Askham in KSW Middleweight Tournament Final at KSW 49: Materla vs. Askham 2 on May 18, 2019, for vacant KSW Middleweight Championship. Materla lost the bout via KO in round three.

=== EFM and return to KSW ===
On June 20, 2020, Materla fought at the EFM 3 against Wilhelm Ott for EFM Middleweight Championship, he defeated Ott in the 1st round and won the title in process.

On October 10, 2020, Materla returned to the KSW against Aleksandar Ilić at KSW 55: Askham vs. Khalidov 2. He won the fight via technical knockout in the second round. Three days later, he was awarded a bonus in the fight of the night category of that bout.

On November 14, 2020, at KSW 56: Materla vs. Soldić, Materla fought against the KSW Welterweight Champion, Roberto Soldić, fight took place at middleweight. He lost the bout via technically knockout in first round.

On June 5, 2021, at EFM Show 2 in Bulgaria was to take place, Materla was supposed to defend the EFM Middleweight Championship, but the bout was moved to September 11. The opponent of the popular Cipao in the new date of the bout was revealed to be Moise Rimbon whom he faced before in 2006. Materla won the bout via unanimous decision.

In December 2021 he announced that he was returning to the KSW. Materla returned to the cage of the Polish giant on January 15, 2022, at KSW 66: Ziółkowski vs. Mańkowski against Jason Radcliffe. He won the bout in the first round by TKO.

On May 28, 2022, at KSW 70: Pudzianowski vs. Materla, Materla faced the former strongest man in the world, Mariusz Pudzianowski, the clash took place at heavyweight. He lost the bout in the first round, after Pudzian hit him with uppercut, knocking Materla out cold.

During the first XTB KSW 78, which took place on January 21, 2023, Materla faced Kendall Grove in rematch. Materla won the fight via technical knockout in the second round, after he took down Kendall and smashed him in the ground position with strong elbows.

Materla faced Radoslaw Paczuski at XTB KSW 83: Colosseum 2 on June 3, 2023. He won the bout via knockout in the first round.

Materla fought for the KSW Middleweight Championship against reigning champion Paweł Pawlak on December 16, 2023 at KSW 89: Bartosiński vs. Parnasse, losing the bout via unanimous decision.

Exactly three months later, in the comain of KSW 92, Materla faced Piotr Kuberski, losing the bout 5 seconds before the end of the first round when he was knocked out by Kuberski.

== Personal life ==
In 2012, he played a feature role in the music video for the song “Wilki dwa” (lit. Two Wolves or Wolves Two) from the album “Robaki” of the Luxtorpeda music group. In December 2016, he was detained in his home in Szczecin as part of a mass action by officers of the Central Police Investigation Bureau against people suspected of collaborating as part of an organized criminal group. Due to this incident, Materla was in pre-trial detention for seven months. On December 23, 2022, the District Prosecutor in Poznań discontinued the criminal case against Materla in its entirety.

== Championships and accomplishments ==
=== Mixed martial arts ===
- Konfrontacja Sztuk Walki
  - KSW Middleweight Championship (One time)
    - Four successful title defenses
  - KSW 2006 Middleweight Tournament Winner
  - Fight of the Night (Five times)
  - Knockout of the Night (Three times)
- European Fight Masters
  - EFM Middleweight Championship (One time)

=== Grappling ===
- 2006: Polish Champion in Brazilian Jiu-Jitsu (-91 kg)
- 2006: ADCC Polish runner-up in middleweight (-87.9 kg)
- 2007: Round of 16 of the ADCC World Middleweight Championship (-87.9 kg)
- 2007: Polish champion in submission fighting (-99 kg) and runner-up in the open class
- 2008: ADCC European Middleweight Vice Champion (-87.9 kg)

== Mixed martial arts record ==
Professional record breakdown
44 matches	33 wins	11 losses
By knockout	13	8
By submission	13	0
By decision	7	3

Res.	Record	Opponent	Method	Event	Date	Round	Time	Location	Notes
Loss	33–11	Piotr Kuberski	TKO (punches)	KSW 92	March 16, 2024	1	4:55	Gorzów Wielkopolski, Poland	
Loss	33–10	Paweł Pawlak	Decision (unanimous)	KSW 89	December 16, 2023	5	5:00	Gliwice, Poland	For the KSW Middleweight Championship.
Win	33–9	Radosław Paczuski	KO (punches)	KSW 83	June 3, 2023	1	1:37	Warsaw, Poland	Return to Middleweight. Fight of the Night.
Win	32–9	Kendall Grove	TKO (punches)	KSW 78	January 21, 2023	2	4:27	Szczecin, Poland	Catchweight (195 lb) bout.
Loss	31–9	Mariusz Pudzianowski	KO (punch)	KSW 70	May 28, 2022	1	1:47	Łódź, Poland	Heavyweight debut.
Win	31–8	Jason Radcliffe	TKO (punches)	KSW 66	January 15, 2022	1	4:07	Szczecin, Poland	
Win	30–8	Moise Rimbon	Decision (unanimous)	EFM Show 2	September 11, 2021	3	5:00	Sofia, Bulgaria	Catchweight (194 lb) bout.
Loss	29–8	Roberto Soldić	TKO (punches)	KSW 56	November 14, 2020	1	4:40	Warsaw, Poland	
Win	29–7	Aleksandar Ilić	TKO (elbows and punches)	KSW 55	October 10, 2020	2	1:33	Warsaw, Poland	Fight of the Night.
Win	28–7	Wilhelm Ott	Submission (guillotine choke)	European Fight Masters 3	Jun 20, 2020	1	1:04	Berlin, Germany	Won the vacant EFM Middleweight Championship.
Loss	27–7	Scott Askham	KO (flying knee)	KSW 49	May 18, 2019	3	1:23	Gdańsk, Poland	2019 KSW Middleweight Tournament Final. For the vacant KSW Middleweight Championship. Fight of the Night.
Win	27–6	Damian Janikowski	TKO (punches)	KSW 45	October 6, 2018	1	3:10	London, England	2019 KSW Middleweight Tournament Semifinal.
Win	26–6	Martin Zawada	TKO (punches)	KSW 44	Jun 9, 2018	2	2:59	Gdańsk, Poland	Catchweight (198 lb) bout.
Loss	25–6	Scott Askham	TKO (kick to the body)	KSW 42	March 3, 2018	1	1:09	Łódź, Poland	
Win	25–5	Paulo Thiago	TKO (punches)	KSW 40	October 22, 2017	2	0:50	Dublin, Ireland	Knockout of the Night.
Win	24–5	Rousimar Palhares	KO (punch)	KSW 36	October 1, 2016	2	1:27	Zielona Góra, Poland	Knockout of the Night.
Win	23–5	Antoni Chmielewski	TKO (punches)	KSW 35	May 27, 2016	1	4:12	Gdańsk, Poland	
Loss	22–5	Mamed Khalidov	KO (flying knee and punches)	KSW 33	November 28, 2015	1	0:31	Kraków, Poland	Lost the KSW Middleweight Championship.
Win	22–4	Tomasz Drwal	TKO (punches)	KSW 31	May 23, 2015	3	4:56	Gdańsk, Poland	Defended the KSW Middleweight Championship. Fight of the Night.
Win	21–4	Jorge Luis Bezerra	TKO (punches)	KSW 28	October 4, 2014	2	1:46	Szczecin, Poland	Non-title bout; Bezerra missed weight (187.2 lb).
Win	20–4	Jay Silva	Decision (unanimous)	KSW 26	March 22, 2014	3	5:00	Warsaw, Poland	Defended the KSW Middleweight Championship. Fight of the Night.
Loss	19–4	Jay Silva	KO (punches)	KSW 24	September 28, 2013	2	0:50	Łódź, Poland	Non-title bout.
Win	19–3	Kendall Grove	Decision (unanimous)	KSW 23	Jun 8, 2013	4	5:00	Gdańsk, Poland	Defended the KSW Middleweight Championship. Fight of the Night.
Win	18–3	Rodney Wallace	KO (punch)	KSW 21	December 1, 2012	1	0:21	Warsaw, Poland	Defended the KSW Middleweight Championship. Knockout of the Night.
Win	17–3	Jay Silva	Decision (majority)	KSW 19	May 12, 2012	3	5:00	Łódź, Poland	Won the vacant KSW Middleweight Championship. Fight of the Night.
Win	16–3	Matt Horwich	Decision (unanimous)	KSW 17	October 26, 2011	3	3:00	Łódź, Poland	
Win	15–3	James Zikic	Decision (unanimous)	KSW 16	May 21, 2011	2	5:00	Gdańsk, Poland	
Win	14–3	Gregory Babene	Submission (guillotine choke)	KSW 15	March 19, 2011	2	2:30	Warsaw, Poland	
Win	13–3	Bohumil Lungrik	Submission (guillotine choke)	Pro Fight 3	February 22, 2009	1	2:20	Olsztyn, Poland	
Loss	12–3	Antonio Mendes	Decision (split)	KSW 7	June 2, 2007	2	5:00	Warsaw, Poland	2007 KSW Middleweight Tournament Semifinal.
Win	12–2	Jan Antoska	Submission (guillotine choke)	KSW 7	June 2, 2007	1	2:52	Warsaw, Poland	2007 KSW Middleweight Tournament Quarterfinal.
Won	11–2	Krzysztof Kulak	Submission (guillotine choke)	KSW 6	October 14, 2006	1	2:41	Warsaw, Poland	Won the 2006 KSW Middleweight Tournament.
Win	10–2	Valdas Pocevicius	Technical Submission (rear-naked choke)	KSW 6	October 14, 2006	1	4:28	Warsaw, Poland	2006 KSW Middleweight Tournament Semifinal.
Win	9–2	Evert Fyeet	Submission (rear-naked choke)	KSW 6	October 14, 2006	2	2:13	Warsaw, Poland	2006 KSW Middleweight Tournament Quarterfinal.
Loss	8–2	Moise Rimbon	Decision (unanimous)	World Freefight Challenge: Europe vs. Brazil	May 20, 2006	3	5:00	Koper, Slovenia	
Loss	8–1	Evangelista Santos	KO (punches)	Jungle Fight 5	November 26, 2005	2	1:23	Manaus, Brazil	
Win	8–0	Andrzej Kulik	Decision (unanimous)	Colosseum 5	January 5, 2005	2	5:00	Bielsko-Biała, Poland	
Win	7–0	Wojciech Golaszewski	Submission (kimura)	MMA Poland 7	December 18, 2004	1	1:18	Warsaw, Poland	
Win	6–0	Miika Mehmet	Submission (rear-naked choke)	The Cage Vol. 1	October 2, 2004	1	4:08	Helsinki, Finland	
Win	5–0	Giedrius Pranckevicius	Submission (armbar)	Colosseum 2	May 16, 2004	2	2:36	Chorzów, Poland	
Win	4–0	Christoph Meyer	Submission	Fight Club Berlin 3	March 28, 2004	1	N/A	Berlin, Germany	
Win	3–0	Jaroslaw Stachera	KO (punch)	MMA Poland 3	December 13, 2003	1	0:22	Warsaw, Poland	
Win	2–0	Andrzej Kulik	Technical Submission (kimura)	MMA Poland 2	March 11, 2003	1	3:12	Warsaw, Poland	
Win	1–0	Tomasz Janiszewski	Submission (guillotine choke)	MMA Poland 2	March 11, 2003	2	4:21	Warsaw, Poland	Middleweight debut.

== Exhibition boxing record ==
2 fights	2 wins	0 losses
By knockout	1	0
By decision	1	0

No.	Result	Record	Opponent	Type	Round, time	Date	Location	Notes
2	Win	2–0	Christian Jungwirth	UD	5	11 Apr 2026	Enea Arena, Szczecin, Poland	Oktagon Underground rules
1	Win	1–0	Dawid Załęcki	KO	1 (3), 2:37	6 Sep 2025	Gliwice Arena, Gliwice, Poland	

== See also ==
- List of current KSW fighters
- List of male mixed martial artists
