= Goran Reljić =

Croatian mixed martial arts fighter

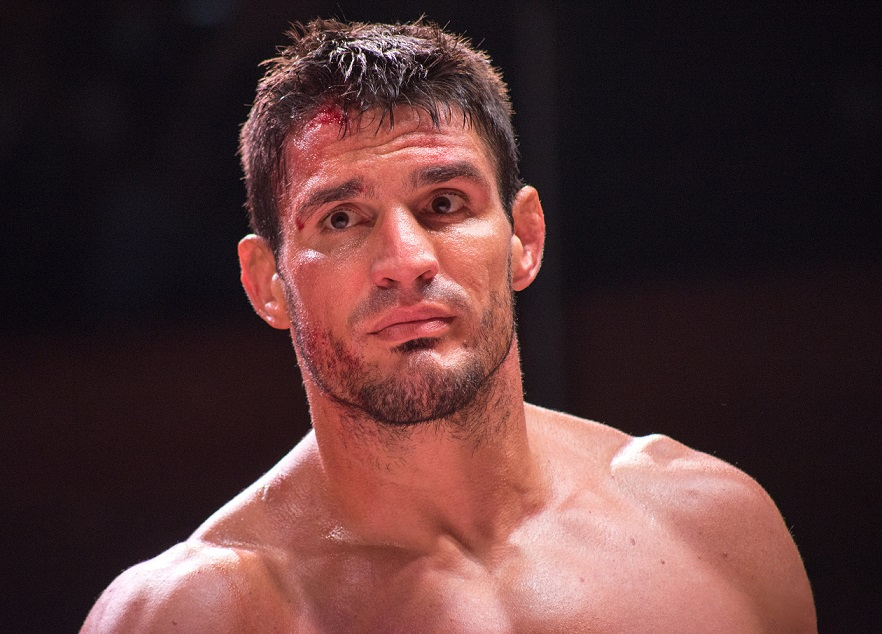
- Born: 20 March 1984 (age 42); Zadar, SFR Yugoslavia (present day Croatia)
- Other names: Ghost
- Nationality: Croatian
- Height: 6 ft 3 in (1.91 m)
- Weight: 205 lb (93 kg; 14.6 st)
- Division: Middleweight (2009–2010); Light Heavyweight (2004–2008, 2010–present); Heavyweight (2012)
- Reach: 81 in (206 cm)
- Style: Brazilian Jiu Jitsu
- Stance: Southpaw
- Fighting out of: Zadar, Croatia
- Team: Renbukai Training Center
- Rank: Black belt in Brazilian Jiu-Jitsu under Adem Redžović
- Years active: 2004–present

Mixed martial arts record
- Total: 32
- Wins: 21
- By knockout: 7
- By submission: 7
- By decision: 7
- Losses: 11
- By knockout: 4
- By decision: 7

Other information
- Mixed martial arts record from Sherdog

Goran Reljić (born 20 March 1984) is a Croatian mixed martial artist and bare knuckle boxer. A professional MMA competitor who began his career in 2004 and most recently competed in 2023, he has fought for the UFC, RIZIN, and KSW.

== Mixed martial arts career ==
Reljić made his professional MMA debut on 4 April 2004 against Bojan Spalević. Reljić won the fight via submission (armbar) in the first round. His second fight was against Andrej Bregar in Trbovlje, Slovenia. Reljić won the fight via submission (arm-triangle choke).

=== Ultimate Fighting Championship ===
Reljić made his UFC debut at light heavyweight against Wilson Gouveia at UFC 84, where he won in the second round by TKO. He then dropped down to middleweight.

His next fight was slated to be at UFC 90 against Thales Leites, but Reljić sustained a serious back injury and was replaced by Drew McFedries. He would not return to active competition for nearly two years.

Reljić finally made his return and faced CB Dollaway on 21 February 2010 at UFC 110, where he would be making his middleweight debut. Reljić lost the fight via unanimous decision.

Reljić faced Kendall Grove on 3 July 2010 at UFC 116 and lost via split decision. One judge scored the fight 29–28 for Reljić, while the other two judges scored it 30–27 and 29–28 for Grove.

Reljić returned to the light heavyweight division and faced Krzysztof Soszynski on 13 November 2010 at UFC 122. After losing the fight via unanimous decision, Reljić was released from the promotion.

=== Post-UFC ===
In his first post UFC fight, Reljić faced Goran Šćepanović on 7 October 2011 at BEFN 6, where he won by TKO in the first round.

Reljić then faced Rogent Lloret in a heavyweight bout on 24 March 2012 at Strength and Honor Championship in Geneve Switzerland. Reljić won the fight by TKO in the first round.

Reljić fought Jan Błachowicz in a main fight on KSW 22 for light heavyweight world title. He lost the fight via unanimous decision.

Reljić then faced Nikolay Osokin at Draka 13 on 30 August 2013. Reljić won the fight via TKO (body kick) in the first round.

Reljić returned to KSW on 22 March 2014 against Karol Celinski at KSW 26. Reljić won the fight via unanimous decision.

In his debut for the Rizin Fighting Federation, Reljić faced Vadim Nemkov on 29 December 2015. He lost the fight via TKO in the first round.

=== Absolute Championship Berkut ===
Reljić faced Nikola Dipchikov at ACA 109: Strus vs. Haratyk on 20 August 2020. He lost the bout via first-round TKO.

Reljić faced Carlos Eduardo on 23 April 2021 at ACA 122. He won the bout via split decision.

Reljić faced Davrbek Isakov at ACA 133 on 4 December 2021. He won the bout via TKO in second round.

Reljić faced Vojtech Garba at RFA 3 on 23 July 2022. He lost the bout via unanimous decision.

Reljić faced Stepan Gorshechnikov on 8 April 2023 at ACA 155, losing the bout via TKO stoppage in the first round.

Reljić faced Alexey Efremov on 24 November 2023 at ACA 166, losing the bout after retiring from the bout after the first round.

== Bare knuckle boxing career ==
He made his debut in a bare knuckle boxing becoming UBBADA world light heavyweight champion at BKB 7 event in Liverpool on 9 September 2017, defeating Ricky Nelder via unanimous decision.

On next event he defended title against Jimmy McCrory on 4 November 2017. Fight was declared no contest because McCrory's jaw appears to be broken after a clash of heads.

=== Bare knuckle boxing record ===
2 Wins, 0 Losses, 0 Draws, 2 NC
Date	Result	Opponent	Event	Method	Round	Time	Notes
2018-06-09	NC	(England) Danny Macintosh	BKB 11, O2 Arena, London, England, United Kingdom	NC	1	N/A	Retains UBBADA World Light Heavyweight Championship after Macintosh's corner indicated to ref their fighter couldn't continue due to an arm injury.
2018-03-24	Win	(England) Kevin Thompson	BKB 10 Liverpool	TKO	2	2:00	Defended UBBADA World Light Heavyweight Championship. TKO due to a doctor stoppage.
2017-11-04	NC	(England) Jimmy McCrory	BKB 8 Coventry	NC	1	N/A	Retains UBBADA World Light Heavyweight Championship. NC due to a clash of the heads.
2017-09-09	Win	(England) Ricky Nelder	BKB 7 Liverpool	UD	5	2:00	Wins UBBADA World Light Heavyweight Championship.

== Championships and accomplishments ==
- Konfrontacja Sztuk Walki
  - KSW Light Heavyweight World Championship (One time)
  - Fight of the Night (One time) vs. Jan Błachowicz
- Ultimate Fighting Championship
  - Fight of the Night (One time) vs. Wilson Gouveia
  - UFC.com Awards
    - 2008: Ranked #9 Fight of the Year vs. Wilson Gouveia

== Mixed martial arts record ==
Professional record breakdown
33 matches	21 wins	12 losses
By knockout	7	5
By submission	7	0
By decision	7	7

Res.	Record	Opponent	Method	Event	Date	Round	Time	Location	Notes
Loss	21–12	Alexey Efremov	TKO (retirement)	ACA 166: Magomedov vs. Dolgov	24 November 2023	1	5:00	Saint Petersburg, Russia	
Loss	21–11	Stepan Gorshechnikov	TKO (punches)	ACA 155: Karginov vs. Silva	8 April 2023	1	1:56	Minsk, Belarus	
Loss	21–10	Vojtech Garba	Decision (unanimous)	RFA 3	23 July 2022	3	5:00	Ostrava, Czech Republic	
Win	21–9	Davrbek Isakov	TKO (punches)	ACA 133: Bimarzaev vs. Lima	4 December 2021	2	1:25	Saint Petersburg, Russia	
Win	20–9	Carlos Eduardo	Decision (split)	ACA 122: Johnson vs. Poberezhets	23 April 2021	3	5:00	Minsk, Belarus	
Loss	19–9	Nikola Dipchikov	TKO (punches)	ACA 109: Strus vs. Haratyk	20 August 2020	1	2:38	Łódź, Poland	
Win	19–8	Miro Jurković	Decision (split)	Serbian Battle Championship 28	19 June 2020	3	5:00	Odžaci, Serbia	
Win	18–8	Pedro Brum	KO (punch)	Serbian Battle Championship 27	14 March 2020	2	0:24	Vrbas, Serbia	
Win	17–8	Anđelko Kitić	Submission (rear-naked choke)	Trieste Fight Night 2	8 December 2018	1	3:50	Trieste, Italy	
Win	16–8	Daniel Dörrer	Submission (armbar)	Mannheimer Hafenkeilerei 6	9 December 2017	1	3:50	Mannheim, Germany	
Loss	15–8	Mattia Schiavolin	Decision (unanimous)	Superior FC 15	29 October 2016	5	5:00	Rüsselsheim, Germany	For the Superior FC Middleweight Championship.
Loss	15–7	Kazbek Saidaliev	Decision (unanimous)	Akhmat Fight Show 23: Grand Prix Akhmat 2016	11 June 2016	3	5:00	Grozny, Russia	
Loss	15–6	Vadim Nemkov	TKO (punches)	Rizin WGP 2015: Part 1 - Saraba	29 December 2015	1	2:58	Saitama, Japan	Rizin FF World Grand-Prix Quarterfinal.
Loss	15–5	Tomasz Narkun	KO (punches)	KSW 32: Road to Wembley	31 October 2015	1	1:55	London, England	Lost the KSW Light Heavyweight Championship.
Win	15–4	Attila Végh	Decision (split)	KSW 31: Materla vs. Drwal	23 May 2015	3	5:00	Gdańsk, Poland	Won the vacant KSW Light Heavyweight Championship.
Win	14–4	Tomasz Narkun	Decision (majority)	KSW 29: Reload	6 December 2014	3	5:00	Kraków, Poland	KSW Light Heavyweight title eliminator.
Win	13–4	Karol Celinski	Decision (unanimous)	KSW 26: Materla vs. Silva 3	22 March 2014	3	5:00	Warsaw, Poland	
Win	12–4	Nikolay Osokin	TKO (body kick)	Draka 13	30 August 2013	1	0:47	Vladivostok, Russia	
Loss	11–4	Jan Błachowicz	Decision (unanimous)	KSW 22: Pride Time	16 March 2013	3	5:00	Warsaw, Poland	For the KSW Light Heavyweight Championship. Fight of the Night.
Win	11–3	Gadji Magomedov	Decision (unanimous)	Draka 8	11 August 2012	4	3:00	Nakhodka, Russia	
Win	10–3	Rogent Lloret	TKO (punches)	S&HC 5	24 March 2012	1	3:02	Geneva, Switzerland	Heavyweight bout.
Win	9–3	Goran Šćepanović	TKO (punches)	Bilic-Eric Security Fight Night 6	7 October 2011	1	1:31	Zagreb, Croatia	
Loss	8–3	Krzysztof Soszynski	Decision (unanimous)	UFC 122	13 November 2010	3	5:00	Oberhausen, Germany	Return to Light Heavyweight.
Loss	8–2	Kendall Grove	Decision (split)	UFC 116	3 July 2010	3	5:00	Nevada, United States	
Loss	8–1	C.B. Dollaway	Decision (unanimous)	UFC 110	21 February 2010	3	5:00	Sydney, Australia	Middleweight debut.
Win	8–0	Wilson Gouveia	TKO (punches)	UFC 84	24 May 2008	2	3:15	Nevada, United States	Fight of the Night.
Win	7–0	Waldemar Golinski	Decision (unanimous)	BE 2 - Boxing Explosion 2	2 August 2007	2	5:00	Celje, Slovenia	
Win	6–0	Tomek Smykowski	Submission (armbar)	CF - The Real Deal	5 May 2007	1	4:51	Maribor, Slovenia	
Win	5–0	Petr Kelner	Submission (armbar)	Ultimate Fight - Challenge 1	9 December 2006	2	3:47	Samobor, Croatia	
Win	4–0	Bojan Mihajlović	Submission (kimura)	NS 3 - Noc Skorpiona 3	18 February 2006	1	2:51	Šibenik, Croatia	
Win	3–0	Nenad Đurić	TKO (punches)	NS 1 - Noc Skorpiona 1	29 April 2005	2	0:54	Zadar, Croatia	
Win	2–0	Andrej Bregar	Submission (arm-triangle choke)	Trboulje 1 - Croatia vs. Slovenia	5 November 2004	1	1:52	Ljubljana, Slovenia	
Win	1–0	Bojan Spalević	Submission (armbar)	UFD - Ultimate Fight Dubravc	4 April 2004	1	4:20	Zagreb, Croatia	
