= Lilium Tower =

Proposed skyscraper in Warsaw, Poland

Coordinates: 52°13′38″N 21°00′12″E

The Lilium Tower, designed by Zaha Hadid, is a skyscraper proposed to be built in Warsaw, Poland.

The building would be located on the site presently occupied by part of the Centrum LIM, replacing the flat western wing of the complex.

The tower is to have 260 metres (850 ft), which at the time it was first proposed, at the beginning of the 21st century, would have made it the tallest building in Poland.

== See also ==
- List of tallest buildings in Poland
