= Jan Błachowicz =

Polish mixed martial artist (born 1983)

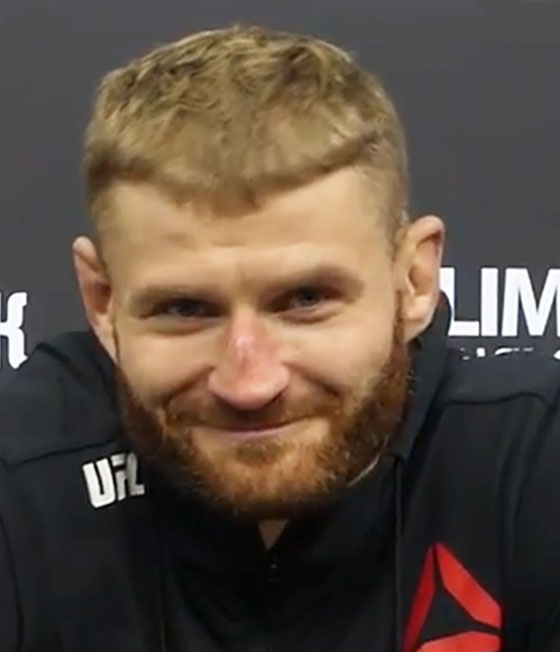
- Błachowicz at UFC Fight Night 136 post fight interview in Moscow, 2018
- Born: Jan Maciej Błachowicz; 24 February 1983 (age 43); Cieszyn, Poland
- Height: 6 ft 2 in (1.88 m)
- Weight: 205 lb (93 kg; 14 st 9 lb)
- Division: Light heavyweight
- Reach: 78 in (198 cm)
- Fighting out of: Warsaw, Poland
- Team: Berkut WCA Fight Team (until 2014, 2017–present); Ankos MMA (2014–2017)
- Rank: Black belt in Brazilian Jiu-Jitsu under Kamil Umiński and Radosław Turek
- Years active: 2007–present

Mixed martial arts record
- Total: 43
- Wins: 29
- By knockout: 9
- By submission: 9
- By decision: 11
- Losses: 12
- By knockout: 3
- By submission: 2
- By decision: 7
- Draws: 2

Other information
- Mixed martial arts record from Sherdog

Jan Maciej Błachowicz (Polish: [ˈjan bwaˈxɔvitʂ]; born 24 February 1983) is a Polish professional mixed martial artist. He currently competes in the Light Heavyweight division of the Ultimate Fighting Championship (UFC), where he is a former UFC Light Heavyweight Champion. Błachowicz is the second Polish fighter to win a UFC title after Joanna Jędrzejczyk and the first male Polish champion. A professional since 2007, he also competed for KSW and is the former KSW Light Heavyweight Champion.

== Background ==
Growing up in Cieszyn, Poland, Błachowicz started training in martial arts – initially judo at the age of nine – due to the influence of action movies, he also did grappling, muay thai (where he achieved 34 wins) and won tournaments in both sports before transitioning into mixed martial arts.

== Mixed martial arts career ==
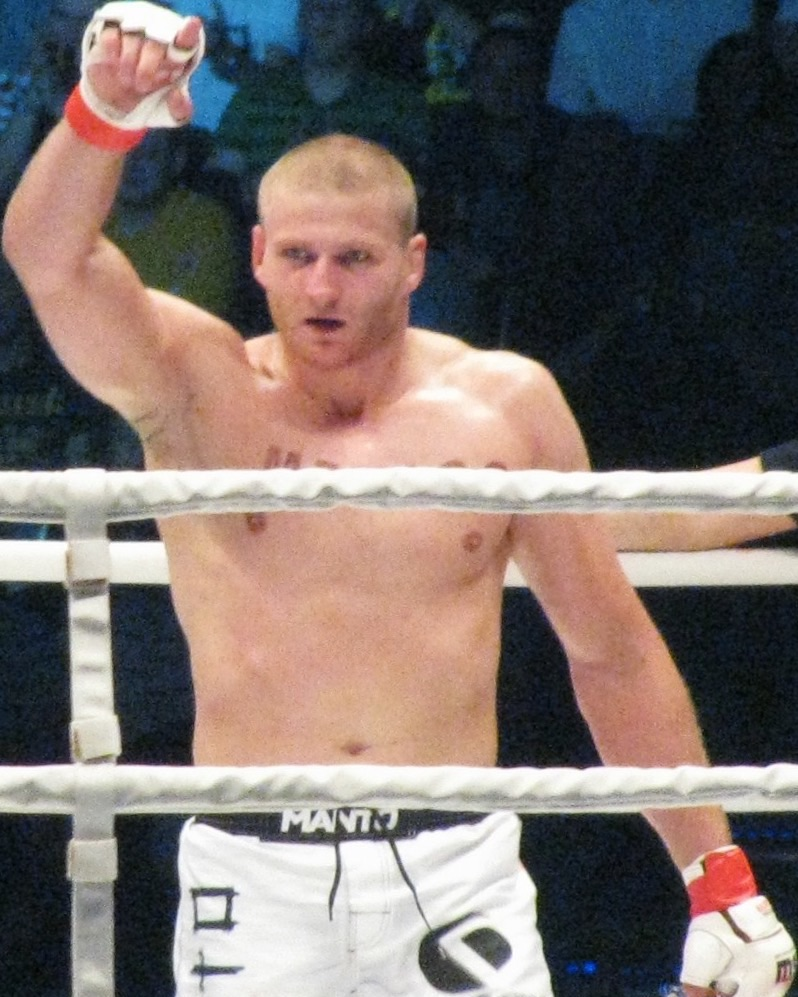
Jan Błachowicz in the ring celebrating victory

=== KSW ===
Błachowicz entered in KSWs inaugural <95 kg (209 lb) Tournament at KSW 9. Defeating three opponents in one night, Błachowicz was able to claim the tournament crown. His first opponent was Martin Zawada, who he defeated by unanimous decision. Błachowicz was able to defeat his next two opponents by armbar, including the notable opponent Antoni Chmielewski.

Błachowicz went on to defeat Christian M'Pumbu four months later via armbar, before defeating previously unbeaten Maro Perak in December 2008.

Looking to expand his horizons after the very successful year 2008, Błachowicz accepted the invitation of Tomasz Drwal and joined him at the Throwdown Training Center in San Diego for a few months. He agreed to temporarily fight at Heavyweight, against Lloyd Marshbanks under the War Gods banner, but the event was canceled. Despite suffering a serious knee injury in July, Błachowicz continued his training, as he agreed to fight "somewhere in Mexico". About three weeks later, his knee suddenly popped in training when executing a takedown. The anterior cruciate ligament in his right knee was destroyed, making a knee reconstruction after his return to Poland inevitable.

=== Return to MMA ===
Błachowicz was planning his comeback fight in March against Aleksandar Radosavljevic at WFC 10, but decided to withdraw and was replaced by fellow KSW TEAM member Antoni Chmielewski. After finally returning from the knee injury and 17 months layoff, Błachowicz entered into the second KSW <95 kg tournament. Błachowicz had to face two opponents in the same night. His first opponent was the undefeated Brazilian Julio Brutus. Błachowicz was able to knock Brutus out with a high kick-right hook combination at 3:40 in the first round. In the semifinal, Błachowicz submitted his training partner Wojciech Orłowski with a rear-naked choke after just 1:37.

In the meantime, Błachowicz took a fight on a few days notice against Nikolai Onikienko and submitted him in the second round.

He then faced Daniel Tabera in the final of the tournament at KSW XIV, winning via TKO in the second round and becoming once again the KSW Light Heavyweight Tournament Champion. Błachowicz then faced Rameau Thierry Sokoudjou for the vacant KSW Light Heavyweight Championship at KSW XV. He lost the fight via TKO, being unable to answer the bell for the third round because of his injured leg.

Błachowicz had a rematch with Sokoudjou at KSW XVII. He won the bout via unanimous decision to become the new KSW Light Heavyweight Champion. His next three fights in KSW were against Mario Miranda, Houston Alexander and Goran Reljic, and all three he won by unanimous decision.

=== Ultimate Fighting Championship ===
In January 2014, after completing a 17–3 record on the European scene, Błachowicz signed a contract to fight in the light heavyweight division of the UFC.

In his UFC debut, Błachowicz faced Ilir Latifi on 4 October 2014 at UFC Fight Night 53. He won the fight via TKO in the first round.

Błachowicz faced Jimi Manuwa on 11 April 2015 at UFC Fight Night 64. Błachowicz lost the fight via unanimous decision.

Błachowicz was expected to face Anthony Johnson on 5 September 2015 at UFC 191. However, Johnson was pulled from the bout on 30 July in favor of a fight with Jimi Manuwa at the event. In turn, Błachowicz instead faced Corey Anderson on the same card. He lost the fight via unanimous decision.

Błachowicz next faced Igor Pokrajac on 10 April 2016 at UFC Fight Night 86. He won the fight via unanimous decision.

Błachowicz faced Alexander Gustafsson on 3 September 2016 at UFC Fight Night 93. He lost the fight via unanimous decision.

Błachowicz was expected to face Ovince Saint Preux on 4 February 2017 at UFC Fight Night 104. However, he pulled out on 21 January due to injury and was replaced by promotional newcomer Volkan Oezdemir.

Błachowicz was quickly rescheduled and faced Patrick Cummins on 8 April 2017 at UFC 210. After a strong first round where he rocked Cummins on multiple occasions, Błachowicz soon fell to Cummins' wrestling and his own lack of stamina in the second and third rounds. He lost the fight via majority decision.

Błachowicz faced Devin Clark on 21 October 2017 at UFC Fight Night: Cowboy vs. Till. He won the fight via rear-naked choke submission in the second round. This win earned him the Performance of the Night award.

Błachowicz faced Jared Cannonier on 16 December 2017 at UFC on Fox 26. He won the fight via unanimous decision.

Błachowicz faced Jimi Manuwa in a rematch on 17 March 2018 at UFC Fight Night 127. He won the fight via unanimous decision. The win also earned him his first Fight of the Night bonus award.

Błachowicz faced Nikita Krylov on 15 September 2018 at UFC Fight Night 136. He won the fight via arm-triangle choke submission in the second round. This win earned him the Performance of the Night award.

Błachowicz faced Thiago Santos on 23 February 2019 at UFC Fight Night 145. Błachowicz was caught with a counter in the third round and lost by TKO, marking the first time in his MMA career that he has been stopped due to strikes.

Błachowicz faced Luke Rockhold on 6 July 2019 at UFC 239. He won the fight via knockout in the second round. This win earned him the Performance of the Night award.

Błachowicz then faced Ronaldo Souza on 16 November 2019 at UFC Fight Night 164. He won the fight by a split decision.

Błachowicz faced Corey Anderson on 15 February 2020 at UFC Fight Night 167 in a rematch of their previous bout. Błachowicz won the bout via first-round knockout. The victory earned him his fourth Performance of the Night bonus award.

==== UFC Light Heavyweight Champion ====
Błachowicz faced Dominick Reyes for the vacant UFC Light Heavyweight Championship on 27 September 2020 at UFC 253. He won the fight via TKO in the second round. This win earned him the Performance of the Night award.

Błachowicz faced UFC Middleweight Champion Israel Adesanya for his first title defense on 6 March 2021 at UFC 259. He won the fight via unanimous decision, becoming the first person to defeat Adesanya in the UFC.

Błachowicz was expected to make his second title defense against Glover Teixeira at UFC 266 on 25 September 2021. However, the bout was postponed and moved to 30 October 2021 at UFC 267. Błachowicz lost the fight and the title via second-round rear-naked choke submission.

==== Post championship ====
Błachowicz was scheduled to face Aleksandar Rakić on 26 March 2022 at UFC on ESPN 33. However, in late January, Błachowicz withdrew due to injury and the bout was rescheduled for UFC on ESPN 36 on 14 May 2022. Błachowicz won the fight via technical knockout after Rakić was rendered unable to continue in the third round due to a knee injury.

Błachowicz faced off against Magomed Ankalaev on 10 December 2022 at UFC 282 for the vacant UFC Light Heavyweight Championship. The fight ended in a controversial split draw. 23 out of 25 media members scored the fight as a win for Ankalaev.

Błachowicz faced former UFC Middleweight champion Alex Pereira on 29 July 2023 at UFC 291. He lost the back-and-forth fight via split decision. 22 out of 26 media outlets scored the bout for Pereira.

Błachowicz was scheduled to face Aleksandar Rakić in a rematch on 20 January 2024 at UFC 297. However, Błachowicz withdrew due to shoulder surgery.

Błachowicz faced Carlos Ulberg on 22 March 2025 at UFC Fight Night 255. He lost the close fight by unanimous decision. 8 out of 12 media outlets scored the bout for Ulberg.

Błachowicz was scheduled to face Bogdan Guskov on 22 November 2025 at UFC Fight Night 265. However, for unknown reasons, it was moved and took place on 6 December 2025, at UFC 323. The bout ended in a majority draw.

Błachowicz was scheduled to face Bogdan Guskov in a rematch on 9 May 2026 at UFC 328. However, Błachowicz withdrew due to a torn meniscus. The bout was re-scheduled for 1 August 2026 at UFC Fight Night 283. In turn, on 13 July, Guskov was moved to headline the previous week's event, UFC Fight Night 282 after Khalil Rountree Jr. withdrew due to injury. Błachowicz was originally asked to step in on short notice for the prior week's main event but said he was not able to make the weight limit one week prior to his scheduled bout. Błachowicz remained on the 1 August 2026 card and faced Navajo Stirling instead. Błachowicz lost the fight by technical knockout via elbows and punches in the first round.

== Personal life ==
Błachowicz is a close friend of former UFC fighter Tomasz Drwal. They were training together at the Throwdown Training Center in San Diego when he suffered his knee injury in 2009. Some time ago he moved to Warsaw with his girlfriend, changing his long-time club Octagon Rybnik to Paweł Nastula's club. He also occasionally trains in Alliance MMA with names such as Alexander Gustafsson, Phil Davis, Joey Beltran, and Dominick Cruz.

Błachowicz confirmed the birth of his son in December 2020.

== Championships and accomplishments ==
=== Mixed martial arts ===
- Ultimate Fighting Championship
  - UFC Light Heavyweight Championship (One time)
    - One successful title defense
    - First male Polish champion in UFC history
  - Performance of the Night (Five times) vs. Devin Clark, Nikita Krylov, Luke Rockhold, Corey Anderson and Dominick Reyes
    - Tied (Forrest Griffin & Tito Ortiz) for sixth most Post-Fight bonuses in UFC Light Heavyweight division history (6)
  - Fight of the Night (One time) vs. Jimi Manuwa
  - Tied (Jon Jones) for fourth most bouts in UFC Light Heavyweight division history (22)
  - Seventh most wins in UFC Light Heavyweight division history (12)
  - Second most total fight time in UFC Light Heavyweight division history (4:51:56)
  - Second most significant strikes landed in UFC Light Heavyweight division history (1037)
  - Third most total strikes landed in UFC Light Heavyweight division history (1466)
  - Most decision bouts in UFC Light Heavyweight division history (13)
  - UFC.com Awards
    - 2019: Ranked #9 Knockout of the Year vs. Luke Rockhold & Ranked #10 Upset of the Year vs. Luke Rockhold
    - 2020: Ranked #2 Fighter of the Year & Ranked #8 Upset of the Year vs. Dominick Reyes
    - 2021: Ranked #5 Upset of the Year vs. Israel Adesanya
- Konfrontacja Sztuk Walki
  - KSW Light Heavyweight Championship (One time; former)
    - Two successful title defenses
  - KSW 2010 Light Heavyweight Tournament Winner
  - KSW 2008 Light Heavyweight Tournament Winner
  - KSW 2007 Light Heavyweight Tournament Winner
  - Fight of the Night (Three times)
- Yahoo! Sports
  - 2020 MMA Fighter of the Year
- CBS Sports
  - 2020 #3 Ranked UFC Fighter of the Year
- Slacky Awards
  - 2018 Technical Turn-Around of the Year tied with Dustin Poirier and Henry Cejudo

=== Muay Thai ===
- 2008: European Open Cup − 1st place, 91 kg (A class)
- 2008: IFMA World Championships − 1st place, 91 kg (B class)
- 2007: IFMA World Championships − 3rd place, 91 kg (B class)
- 2007: Polish Championships − 1st place, over 91 kg
- 2006: Polish Cup − 3rd place 91 kg

=== Grappling ===
- 2007: Polish BJJ League − 1st place, 98 kg
- 2007: Polish Open Submission Fighting Championships − 2nd place, 99 kg
- 2007: Polish BJJ Cup − 1st place, 97 kg
- 2005: Polish BJJ Championships − 3rd place, open
- 2005: Polish BJJ Cup − 1st place, over 91 kg

== Mixed martial arts record ==
Professional record breakdown
43 matches	29 wins	12 losses
By knockout	9	3
By submission	9	2
By decision	11	7
Draws	2	

Res.	Record	Opponent	Method	Event	Date	Round	Time	Location	Notes
Loss	29–12–2	Navajo Stirling	TKO (elbows and punches)	UFC Fight Night: Medić vs. Rodriguez	1 August 2026	1	2:56	Belgrade, Serbia	
Draw	29–11–2	Bogdan Guskov	Draw (majority)	UFC 323	6 December 2025	3	5:00	Las Vegas, Nevada, United States	
Loss	29–11–1	Carlos Ulberg	Decision (unanimous)	UFC Fight Night: Edwards vs. Brady	22 March 2025	3	5:00	London, England	
Loss	29–10–1	Alex Pereira	Decision (split)	UFC 291	29 July 2023	3	5:00	Salt Lake City, Utah, United States	
Draw	29–9–1	Magomed Ankalaev	Draw (split)	UFC 282	10 December 2022	5	5:00	Las Vegas, Nevada, United States	For the vacant UFC Light Heavyweight Championship.
Win	29–9	Aleksandar Rakić	TKO (knee injury)	UFC on ESPN: Błachowicz vs. Rakić	14 May 2022	3	1:11	Las Vegas, Nevada, United States	
Loss	28–9	Glover Teixeira	Submission (rear-naked choke)	UFC 267	30 October 2021	2	3:02	Abu Dhabi, United Arab Emirates	Lost the UFC Light Heavyweight Championship.
Win	28–8	Israel Adesanya	Decision (unanimous)	UFC 259	6 March 2021	5	5:00	Las Vegas, Nevada, United States	Defended the UFC Light Heavyweight Championship.
Win	27–8	Dominick Reyes	TKO (punches)	UFC 253	27 September 2020	2	4:36	Abu Dhabi, United Arab Emirates	Won the vacant UFC Light Heavyweight Championship. Performance of the Night.
Win	26–8	Corey Anderson	KO (punch)	UFC Fight Night: Anderson vs. Błachowicz 2	15 February 2020	1	3:08	Rio Rancho, New Mexico, United States	Performance of the Night.
Win	25–8	Ronaldo Souza	Decision (split)	UFC Fight Night: Błachowicz vs. Jacaré	16 November 2019	5	5:00	São Paulo, Brazil	
Win	24–8	Luke Rockhold	KO (punches)	UFC 239	6 July 2019	2	1:39	Las Vegas, Nevada, United States	Performance of the Night.
Loss	23–8	Thiago Santos	TKO (punches)	UFC Fight Night: Błachowicz vs. Santos	23 February 2019	3	0:39	Prague, Czech Republic	
Win	23–7	Nikita Krylov	Submission (arm-triangle choke)	UFC Fight Night: Hunt vs. Oleinik	15 September 2018	2	2:41	Moscow, Russia	Performance of the Night.
Win	22–7	Jimi Manuwa	Decision (unanimous)	UFC Fight Night: Werdum vs. Volkov	17 March 2018	3	5:00	London, England	Fight of the Night.
Win	21–7	Jared Cannonier	Decision (unanimous)	UFC on Fox: Lawler vs. dos Anjos	16 December 2017	3	5:00	Winnipeg, Manitoba, Canada	
Win	20–7	Devin Clark	Submission (rear-naked choke)	UFC Fight Night: Cowboy vs. Till	21 October 2017	2	3:02	Gdańsk, Poland	Performance of the Night.
Loss	19–7	Patrick Cummins	Decision (majority)	UFC 210	8 April 2017	3	5:00	Buffalo, New York, United States	
Loss	19–6	Alexander Gustafsson	Decision (unanimous)	UFC Fight Night: Arlovski vs. Barnett	3 September 2016	3	5:00	Hamburg, Germany	
Win	19–5	Igor Pokrajac	Decision (unanimous)	UFC Fight Night: Rothwell vs. dos Santos	10 April 2016	3	5:00	Zagreb, Croatia	
Loss	18–5	Corey Anderson	Decision (unanimous)	UFC 191	5 September 2015	3	5:00	Las Vegas, Nevada, United States	
Loss	18–4	Jimi Manuwa	Decision (unanimous)	UFC Fight Night: Gonzaga vs. Cro Cop 2	11 April 2015	3	5:00	Kraków, Poland	
Win	18–3	Ilir Latifi	TKO (body kick and punches)	UFC Fight Night: Nelson vs. Story	4 October 2014	1	1:58	Stockholm, Sweden	
Win	17–3	Goran Reljić	Decision (unanimous)	KSW 22	16 March 2013	3	5:00	Warsaw, Poland	Defended the KSW Light Heavyweight Championship.
Win	16–3	Houston Alexander	Decision (unanimous)	KSW 20	15 September 2012	3	5:00	Gdańsk, Poland	Defended the KSW Light Heavyweight Championship.
Win	15–3	Mario Miranda	Decision (unanimous)	KSW 18	25 February 2012	3	5:00	Płock, Poland	Non-title bout.
Win	14–3	Rameau Thierry Sokoudjou	Decision (unanimous)	KSW 17	26 November 2011	3	5:00	Łódź, Poland	Won the KSW Light Heavyweight Championship.
Win	13–3	Toni Valtonen	Submission (rear-naked choke)	KSW 16	21 May 2011	2	1:23	Gdańsk, Poland	
Loss	12–3	Rameau Thierry Sokoudjou	TKO (retirement)	KSW 15	19 March 2011	2	5:00	Warsaw, Poland	For the vacant KSW Light Heavyweight Championship.
Win	12–2	Daniel Tabera	TKO (punches)	KSW 14	24 September 2010	2	4:20	Łódź, Poland	Won the 2010 KSW Light Heavyweight Tournament.
Win	11–2	Nikolai Onikienko	Submission (rear-naked choke)	Modern Fighting Pankration: Volga Cup 2010	24 June 2010	2	2:32	Cheboksary, Russia	
Win	10–2	Wojciech Orłowski	Submission (rear-naked choke)	KSW 13	7 May 2010	1	1:37	Katowice, Poland	2010 KSW Light Heavyweight Tournament Semifinal.
Win	9–2	Julio Brutus	KO (head kick and punch)	KSW 13	7 May 2010	1	3:40	Katowice, Poland	2010 KSW Light Heavyweight Tournament Quarterfinal.
Win	8–2	Maro Perak	Submission (rear-naked choke)	KSW 10	12 December 2008	2	1:51	Warsaw, Poland	
Win	7–2	Christian M'Pumbu	Submission (armbar)	KSW Extra	13 September 2008	2	3:12	Dąbrowa Górnicza, Poland	
Win	6–2	Aziz Karaoglu	Submission (armbar)	KSW 9	9 May 2008	1	4:13	Warsaw, Poland	Won the 2008 KSW Light Heavyweight Tournament.
Win	5–2	Antoni Chmielewski	Submission (armbar)	KSW 9	9 May 2008	2	2:54	Warsaw, Poland	2008 KSW Light Heavyweight Tournament Semifinal.
Win	4–2	Martin Zawada	Decision (unanimous)	KSW 9	9 May 2008	2	5:00	Warsaw, Poland	2008 KSW Light Heavyweight Tournament Quarterfinal.
Loss	3–2	Andre Fyeet	Submission (kimura)	KSW 8	10 November 2007	1	1:57	Warsaw, Poland	
Win	3–1	Daniel Dowda	TKO (knee and punches)	KSW Elimination	15 September 2007	1	1:35	Wrocław, Poland	Won the 2007 KSW Light Heavyweight Tournament.
Win	2–1	Pawel Gasinski	TKO (punches)	KSW Elimination	15 September 2007	1	2:36	Wrocław, Poland	2007 KSW Light Heavyweight Tournament Semifinal.
Win	1–1	Sebastian Olchawa	Decision (unanimous)	KSW Elimination	15 September 2007	2	5:00	Wrocław, Poland	Light Heavyweight debut. 2007 KSW Light Heavyweight Tournament Quarterfinal.
Loss	0–1	Marcin Krysztofiak	Decision (unanimous)	Full Contact Prestige 3	25 February 2007	2	5:00	Poznań, Poland	Openweight bout.

== Pay-per-view bouts ==
No.	Event	Fight	Date	Venue	City	PPV buys
1.	UFC 259	Błachowicz vs. Adesanya	6 March 2021	UFC Apex	Las Vegas, Nevada, U.S.	800,000
2.	UFC 282	Błachowicz vs. Ankalaev	10 December 2022	T-Mobile Arena	Las Vegas, Nevada, U.S.	Not Disclosed

== See also ==
- List of current UFC fighters
- List of male mixed martial artists
- List of UFC champions

Awards and achievements
Vacant Title last held by Jon Jones	15th UFC Light Heavyweight Champion; 27 September 2020 – 30 October 2021	Succeeded by Glover Teixeira
