= Francis Carmont =

Mixed martial artist

- Born: October 11, 1981 (age 45); Saint-Tropez, France
- Other names: Limitless
- Nationality: French
- Height: 6 ft 3 in (191 cm)
- Weight: 205 lb (93 kg; 14 st 9 lb)
- Division: Light Heavyweight; Middleweight
- Reach: 78 in (198 cm)
- Fighting out of: Montreal, Quebec, Canada
- Team: Tristar Gym; French Top Team
- Rank: Brown belt in Brazilian Jiu-Jitsu
- Years active: 2004-present

Mixed martial arts record
- Total: 37
- Wins: 25
- By knockout: 6
- By submission: 11
- By decision: 8
- Losses: 12
- By knockout: 3
- By submission: 3
- By decision: 6

Other information
- Mixed martial arts record from Sherdog
- Last updated on: 29 October 2011

Francis Carmont (born October 11, 1981) is a French professional mixed martial artist who last competed in the Light Heavyweight division. A professional competitor since 2004, Carmont has competed for Bellator MMA, the UFC, and KSW.

== Mixed martial arts career ==
=== Early career ===
Carmont made his professional MMA debut February 2004. He amassed a record of 16 wins and 7 losses before making his UFC debut.

=== Ultimate Fighting Championship ===
Carmont signed with the UFC and made his debut at UFC 137 against Chris Camozzi, winning via unanimous decision.

Carmont won via submission over promotional newcomer Magnus Cedenblad on April 14, 2012 at UFC on Fuel TV 2.

Carmont next faced Karlos Vemola on July 11, 2012 at UFC on Fuel TV: Munoz vs. Weidman. He won the fight via submission in the second round.

Carmont defeated Tom Lawlor on November 17, 2012 at UFC 154 via controversial split decision.

Carmont defeated Lorenz Larkin on April 20, 2013 at UFC on Fox 7 via unanimous decision. The decision was viewed by many as controversial as most major MMA media outlets scored the bout for his opponent.

Carmont next faced Costas Philippou on September 21, 2013 at UFC 165. Carmont won the fight via unanimous decision, taking Philippou down in each round and controlling him on the ground.

Carmont faced Ronaldo Souza on February 15, 2014 at UFC Fight Night 36. He lost the fight via unanimous decision.

Carmont faced CB Dollaway on May 31, 2014 at UFC Fight Night 41. He lost the fight by unanimous decision.

Carmont faced Thales Leites on August 23, 2014 at UFC Fight Night 49. Carmont lost the fight via second-round KO, dropping his third straight fight and was subsequently released from the promotion.

=== Bellator MMA ===
In December 2014, it was announced that Carmont has signed with Bellator MMA.

Carmont made his debut by returning to the Light Heavyweight division against Guilherme Viana at Bellator 135 on March 27, 2015 in his Bellator debut. He won the back-and-forth fight via unanimous decision.

Carmont was next a participant in Bellator's one-night Light Heavyweight tournament at Bellator MMA & Glory: Dynamite 1 on September 19, 2015. He faced Anthony Ruiz in the Alternate bout and won by unanimous decision. Due to Muhammed Lawal being unable to participate in the final due to injury, Carmont faced Phil Davis in the tournament finals. He lost the fight via knockout in the first round.

Carmont was supposed to fight Linton Vassell at Bellator 158 but a cut over Vassell's left eye forced him to withdraw. Carmont instead faced Lukasz Klinger and won via submission in the first round.

The bout against Vassell was re-booked for Bellator 165 on November 19, 2016. Carmont lost the fight by unanimous decision.

On February 20, 2018 it was announced that Bellator had released Carmont from the promotion.

== Mixed martial arts record ==
Professional record breakdown
37 matches	25 wins	12 losses
By knockout	6	3
By submission	11	3
By decision	8	6

Res.	Record	Opponent	Method	Event	Date	Round	Time	Location	Notes
Loss	25–12	Linton Vassell	Decision (unanimous)	Bellator 165	November 19, 2016	3	5:00	San Jose, California, United States	
Win	25–11	Lukasz Klinger	Submission (D'Arce choke)	Bellator 158	July 16, 2016	1	3:54	London, England, United Kingdom	
Loss	24–11	Phil Davis	KO (punches)	Bellator 142: Dynamite 1	September 19, 2015	1	2:15	San Jose, California, United States	Bellator Light Heavyweight Tournament Final.
Win	24–10	Anthony Ruiz	Decision (unanimous)	Bellator 142: Dynamite 1	September 19, 2015	2	5:00	San Jose, California, United States	Bellator Light Heavyweight Tournament Alternate bout.
Win	23–10	Guilherme Viana	Decision (unanimous)	Bellator 135	March 27, 2015	3	5:00	Thackerville, Oklahoma, United States	Light Heavyweight debut.
Loss	22–10	Thales Leites	KO (punches)	UFC Fight Night: Henderson vs. dos Anjos	August 23, 2014	2	0:20	Tulsa, Oklahoma, United States	
Loss	22–9	C. B. Dollaway	Decision (unanimous)	UFC Fight Night: Muñoz vs. Mousasi	May 31, 2014	3	5:00	Berlin, Germany	
Loss	22–8	Ronaldo Souza	Decision (unanimous)	UFC Fight Night: Machida vs. Mousasi	February 15, 2014	3	5:00	Jaraguá do Sul, Brazil	
Win	22–7	Costas Philippou	Decision (unanimous)	UFC 165	September 21, 2013	3	5:00	Toronto, Ontario, Canada	
Win	21–7	Lorenz Larkin	Decision (unanimous)	UFC on Fox: Henderson vs. Melendez	April 20, 2013	3	5:00	San Jose, California, United States	
Win	20–7	Tom Lawlor	Decision (split)	UFC 154	November 17, 2012	3	5:00	Montreal, Quebec, Canada	
Win	19–7	Karlos Vémola	Submission (rear-naked choke)	UFC on Fuel TV: Muñoz vs. Weidman	July 11, 2012	2	1:39	San Jose, California, United States	
Win	18–7	Magnus Cedenblad	Submission (rear-naked choke)	UFC on Fuel TV: Gustafsson vs. Silva	April 14, 2012	2	1:42	Stockholm, Sweden	
Win	17–7	Chris Camozzi	Decision (unanimous)	UFC 137	October 29, 2011	3	5:00	Las Vegas, Nevada, United States	
Win	16–7	Jason Day	TKO (punches)	Slammer in the Hammer	June 17, 2011	1	2:10	Hamilton, Ontario, Canada	
Win	15–7	Kelly Anundson	Submission (armbar)	SHC 4: Monson vs. Perak	April 30, 2011	1	2:06	Geneva, Switzerland	
Win	14–7	Simon Carlsen	TKO (punches)	Heroes Gate 3	March 24, 2011	2	2:43	Prague, Czech Republic	
Win	13–7	Emil Zahariev	Submission (kimura)	SHC 3: Carmont vs. Zahariev	September 18, 2010	2	1:31	Geneva, Switzerland	
Win	12–7	Lukasz Jurkowski	Submission (rear-naked choke)	KSW Extra	September 13, 2008	1	4:14	Warsaw, Poland	
Loss	11–7	Baga Agaev	Submission (armbar)	FightFORCE: Russia vs. The World	April 19, 2008	1	4:59	Moscow, Russia	
Win	11–6	Gerald Burton-Batty	TKO (punches)	Cage Fighting Championships 3	February 15, 2008	1	1:53	Sydney, Australia	
Loss	10–6	Karol Bedorf	Decision (unanimous)	KSW 8: Konfrontacja	November 10, 2007	3	3:00	Warsaw, Poland	KSW 8: Konfrontacja Middleweight Tournament Quarterfinal.
Win	10–5	Todd Broadaway	TKO (punches)	BodogFIGHT: Costa Rica Combat	February 18, 2007	1	3:12	San José, Costa Rica	
Loss	9–5	Vitor Vianna	Decision (unanimous)	Kam Lung: Only the Strongest Survive 5	October 8, 2006	2	5:00	Amsterdam, Netherlands	
Win	9–4	Robert Jocz	Decision (unanimous)	KSW V: Konfrontacja	June 3, 2006	2	5:00	Warsaw, Poland	Won KSW 5: Konfrontacja Middleweight Tournament.
Win	8–4	Piotr Baginski	TKO (knee and punches)	KSW V: Konfrontacja	June 3, 2006	1	4:35	Warsaw, Poland	KSW 5: Konfrontacja Middleweight Tournament Semifinal.
Win	7–4	Goce Candovski	Decision (unanimous)	KSW V: Konfrontacja	June 3, 2006	2	5:00	Warsaw, Poland	KSW 5: Konfrontacja Middleweight Tournament Quarterfinal.
Loss	6–4	Evangelista Santos	Decision (majority)	WFC: Europe vs. Brazil	May 20, 2006	3	5:00	Koper, Slovenia	
Win	6–3	Bastien Huveneers	Submission (Achilles lock)	Defi des Champions	March 20, 2006	2	3:51	Tunis, Tunisia	
Win	5–3	Ali Allouane	Submission (kimura)	Xtreme Gladiators 2	March 3, 2006	1	1:52	Paris, France	
Win	4–3	Al Musa	TKO (punches)	Extreme Fighting 1	October 15, 2005	1	2:24	London, England	
Loss	3–3	Grzegorz Jakubowski	Submission (guillotine choke)	European Vale Tudo 5: Phoenix	October 8, 2005	1	1:52	Stockholm, Sweden	
Loss	3–2	Ross Pointon	TKO (doctor stoppage)	UK MMA Championship 9: Smackdown	November 28, 2004	1	1:13	Essex, England	
Loss	3–1	Daniel Burzotta	Submission (guillotine choke)	UK MMA Championship 7: Rage & Fury	May 30, 2004	1	3:39	Essex, England	
Win	3–0	Slavomir Molnar	Submission (triangle choke)	TotalFight 3	May 24, 2004	2	4:05	Budapest, Hungary	
Win	2–0	Roy Rutten	Submission (armbar)	Kam Lung: Day of the Truth 5	March 24, 2004	1	1:19	Rhoon, Netherlands	
Win	1–0	Kuljit Degun	Submission (armbar)	UK MMA Championship 6: Extreme Warriors	February 29, 2004	1	3:41	Essex, England	

== See also ==
- List of Bellator MMA alumni
