= LIM Center =

Building in Warsaw

Coordinates: 52°13′39″N 21°00′17″E

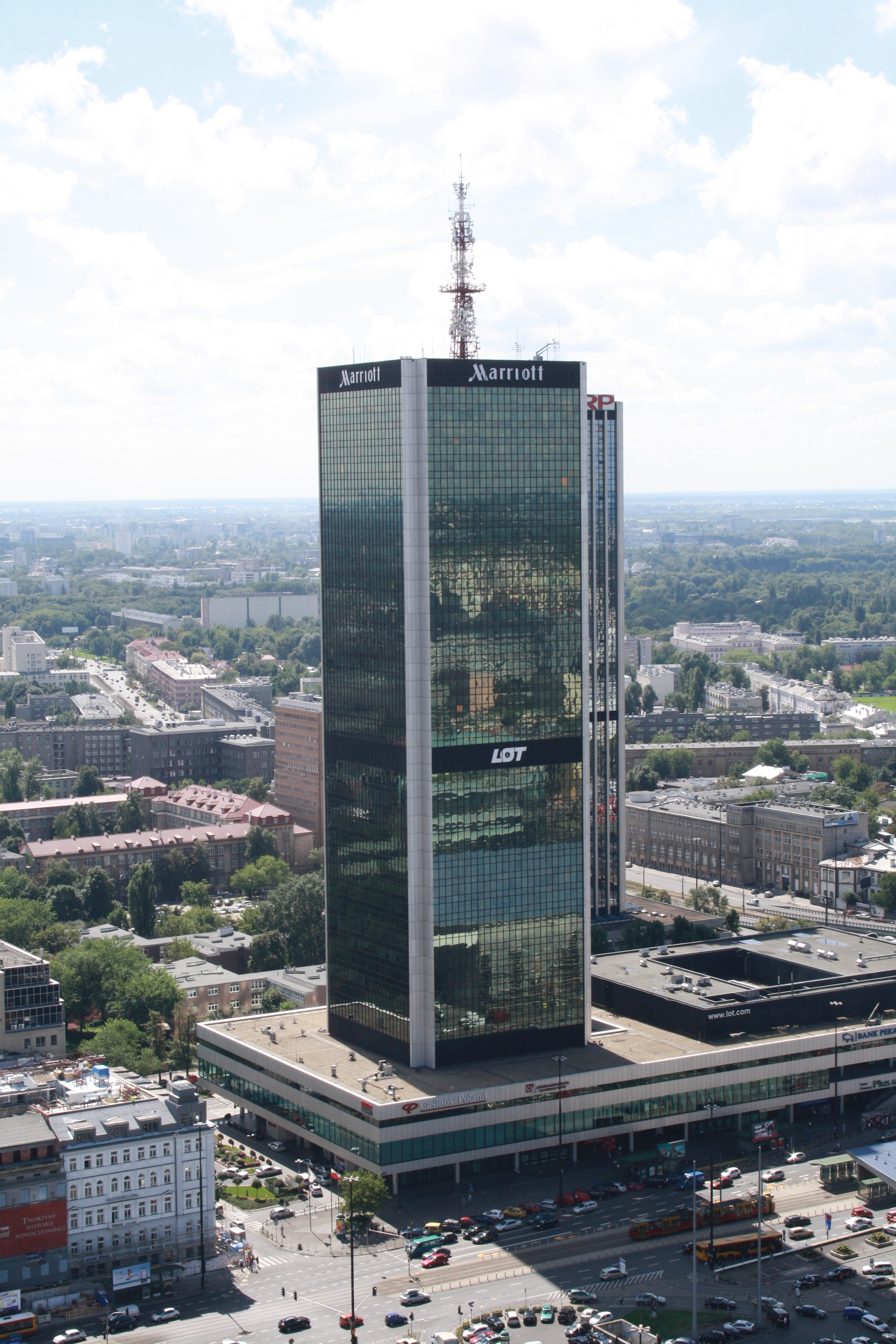
- Interactive map of the LIM Center area

General information
- Status: Completed
- Type: Hotel, offices, retail
- Architectural style: International Style
- Location: Warsaw, Poland
- Construction started: 1977
- Completed: 1989

Height
- Architectural: 170 m (560 ft)
- Roof: 140 m (460 ft)

Technical details
- Floor count: 43
- Floor area: 87,602 m^{2} (942,940 sq ft)

Website
- www.lim.com.pl

The LIM Center (Polish: Centrum LIM) is a skyscraper located in Warsaw, Poland. It was completed in 1989 and is 140 m (460 ft) tall making it Poland's 16th tallest building. The building housed the Warsaw Marriott Hotel until 2024. It is currently the seat of the Warsaw Presidential Hotel.

== History ==
The building was built by LIM Joint Venture Sp. Ltd., a consortium of three partners: LOT (Polish Airlines), ILBAU GmbH (an Austrian construction company), and the hotel chain Marriott International. In 1998, ILBAU sold its share to SGS GmbH.

The designers were Jerzy Skrzypczak, Andrzej Bielobradek, and Krzysztof Stefanski. The architects were Szmigielski Katten Associates in association with Raglan Squire & Partners of London. The facade is a dark green color, and is adjacent to the Oxford Tower. The building has white edges (illuminated at night with bright, white light) as well as two floors that form dark horizontal stripes, one halfway up the structure and the other at the top, that serve as utility areas.

A shopping center known as Gallery LIM is on the two lower floors. It includes about 40 shops, cafes and restaurants, and the LOT ticket office. Rental office space is in the lower part of the tower (between floors 5 and 19).

Without its 30-meter antenna on the roof, the building is 140 meters tall. The building also houses a casino. The building is connected by a tunnel to Warszawa Centralna railway station.

There is a proposal for a 71-storey tower, Lilium, to be built on the site currently occupied by the lower western wing of the building.

=== Warsaw Presidential Hotel ===
In 1989, the Warsaw Marriott Hotel was opened in the building and occupied floors 20 and above, offering 518 rooms and 95 suites. The top floor is a presidential suite. Each room has air conditioning and satellite links. Warsaw Marriott Hotel guests have at their disposal a sauna, swimming pool, conference facilities, restaurants, and two bars. Prominent guests who stayed in the hotel include U.S. Presidents George H. W. Bush, Bill Clinton, Barack Obama, George W. Bush and Joe Biden, Michael Jackson, Luciano Pavarotti, Madeleine Albright, Colin Powell, Al Gore, Helmut Kohl, King Juan Carlos I, Kamala Harris, and Aerosmith.

The hotel operated under the Marriott brand until August 2024. The Polish company LIM Center officially announced that the new name of the hotel would be the Warsaw Presidential Hotel. The new name was inspired by the fact that many heads of state have stayed at the hotel in its history.

== Trivia ==
- In the top two floors of the center is a cafe LIM Panorama Club with one of the highest publicly accessible views of the entire city of Warsaw.
- In 1999, the famous French climber Alain Robert climbed the Marriott Hotel without protection or permission. In the same year, the same feat was completed by Polish photographer and climber Dawid Kaszlikowski, while 10 years later, on 22 April 2009, the building was scaled by Bartholomew Opiela. On 2 June 2019 Marcin Banot climbed the Marriott Hotel.
- The name LIM actually came from the first letter of the name of every member of the venture. L is for LOT, I is for ILBAU, and M is for Marriott.
- Between 1994 and 1996 in the basement of the hotel was situated Maloka BBS, the first commercial ISP maintained by Stanisław Tymiński, an applicant for RP President
- In April 2002, Felix Baumgartner performed the first ever base jump from the roof of the Marriott Hotel.

== See also ==
- List of tallest buildings in Poland
