= Arena COS Torwar =

Indoor arena in Warsaw, Poland

Coordinates: 52°13′21″N 21°2′32″E

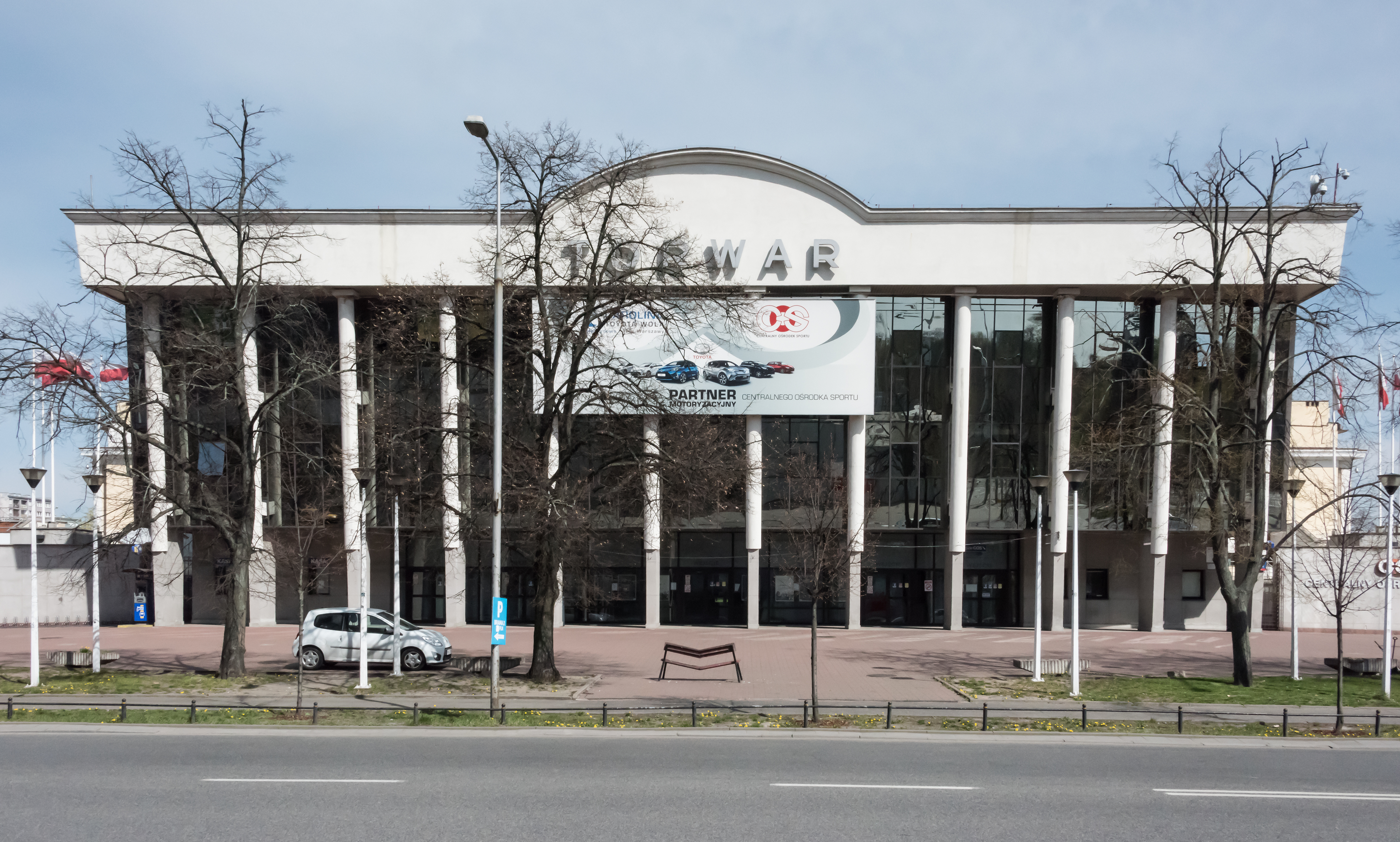
- Interactive map of Arena COS Torwar
- Full name: Central Sports Centre Torwar
- Former names: Hala Torwar (1953-2016)
- Address: ul. Łazienkowska 6a 00-449 Warsaw; Poland
- Location: Ujazdów
- Owner: Centralny Ośrodek Sportu
- Capacity: 4,806

Construction
- Groundbreaking: May 1953
- Opened: 12 December 1953
- Renovated: 1999, 2012
- Architects: Julian Brzuchowski; Danuta Breda

Tenants
- Projekt Warsaw; UHKS Mazowsze; Legia Warsaw (for BCL games)

The Central Sports Centre Torwar (formerly known as Hala Torwar, commonly referred to as the Arena COS Torwar) is an indoor arena in Warsaw, Poland. It opened in 1953 and seats 4,824 people in the stands, with up to an additional 1,480 seats available to add on the floor, located at ul. Łazienkowska 6a in Warsaw.

It is located adjacent to Stadion Wojska Polskiego and is primarily used for popular music concerts, ice hockey and other indoor sports, and it is the home of the hockey team UHKS Mazowsze.

Torwar Hall hosted the 2001 Saporta Cup final in which Maroussi BC defeated Elan Sportif Chalonnais. On 22–28 January 2007 the Hall hosted the 2007 European Figure Skating Championships and the arena hosted a Preliminary round group of the EuroBasket 2009. It has also hosted a number of Konfrontacja Sztuk Walki (KSW) mixed martial arts events.

In 1984 Iron Maiden played the opening night of their 197 concert World Slavery Tour to a capacity crowd at Torwar with thousands of fans listening outside the venue. In 1985 Depeche Mode played one of their first concerts in Eastern Europe in Torwar.

OneRepublic performed at this venue on 2 November 2014 during the European leg of their Native Tour.

Def Leppard played here in 2015 with support from hometown heroes Lessdress, Poland's best known glam/sleaze rock band.

On 1 June 2024, the Polish progressive rock band Riverside performed at the venue; the concert was later released as the live album Live ID.

Preceded by CIG de Malley; Lausanne	Saporta Cup; Final Venue; 2001	Succeeded by Palais des Sports de Gerland; Lyon
