= Marco Villela =

Australian martial artist (born 1974)

- Born: Marco Antonio Medeiros Villela; December 7, 1974; Brazil
- Other names: Giant
- Style: Brazilian Jiu-Jitsu, Muay Thai
- Teacher: Carlos Gracie, Jr.
- Rank: 5th Degree Black Belt in Brazilian Jiu-Jitsu

Other information
- Website: Giant Team

Marco Antonio Medeiros Villela (born December 7, 1974), nicknamed Gigante (The Giant), is a 5th degree Brazilian jiu-jitsu (BJJ) black belt under Carlos Gracie Jr. He is the Head Teacher and founder of Giant Team Australia, based in Sydney, Australia.

Villela worked as the grappling skills coach for the South Sydney Rabbitohs (2012–13).

Villela's younger brother Fabio Gigantinho Villela followed his brother's lead and is Carlos Gracie Jr 2nd degree black belt and is a Head Teacher at Gracie Barra Cedar Park, Texas, USA.

== History ==
Villela was born and raised in Brazil. He began training judo at the age of five and then Muay Thai at 12 years old. Since the age of 19, Gigante has trained BJJ and earned his black belt under Carlos Gracie Jr. after 11 years.

His resume includes over 25 years BJJ, mixed martial arts, Muay Thai and submission grappling experience. In 2011, Gigante left his native Brazil and emigrated to Australia. He briefly started a teaching position at Gracia Oceania, Sydney. In August 2011 he founded Giant Team Australia, Sydney. Giant Team has since expanded into a number of locations across Sydney.

In 2013 Villela worked extensively with K-1 World Grand Prix, Pride Fighting Championships and Ultimate Fighting Championship veteran Mark Hunt in preparation for his fight with Stefan Struve at UFC on Fuel TV: Silva vs. Stann. Villela features in the Fuel TV documentary Art of Fighting, which chronicles Hunt's fight with Struve in Japan.

== Achievements ==
In BJJ competition Villela has generally fought in the Pesadissimo weight class (over 100 kg/221 lbs).

- Pan American Silver Medallist (1996 blue)
- Brazilian National Champion (1997 blue belt)
- Pan American Champion (1999 blue belt– absolute)
- Rio State Champion (2003)
- Mundials Bronze Medallist (2003 brown belt, 2004 black belt)
- Brazilian National Silver Medallist (2004 black belt)
- Melbourne Open Int. Champion (2011 black belt)
- World Pro Cup Australian Trials Champion (2011 black belt)
- Pan Pacific Int Silver Medallist (2011 black belt)
- Queensland state championship Silver Medallist (2011 black belt)
