= Mariusz Pudzianowski =

Polish strongman and mixed martial artist (born 1977)

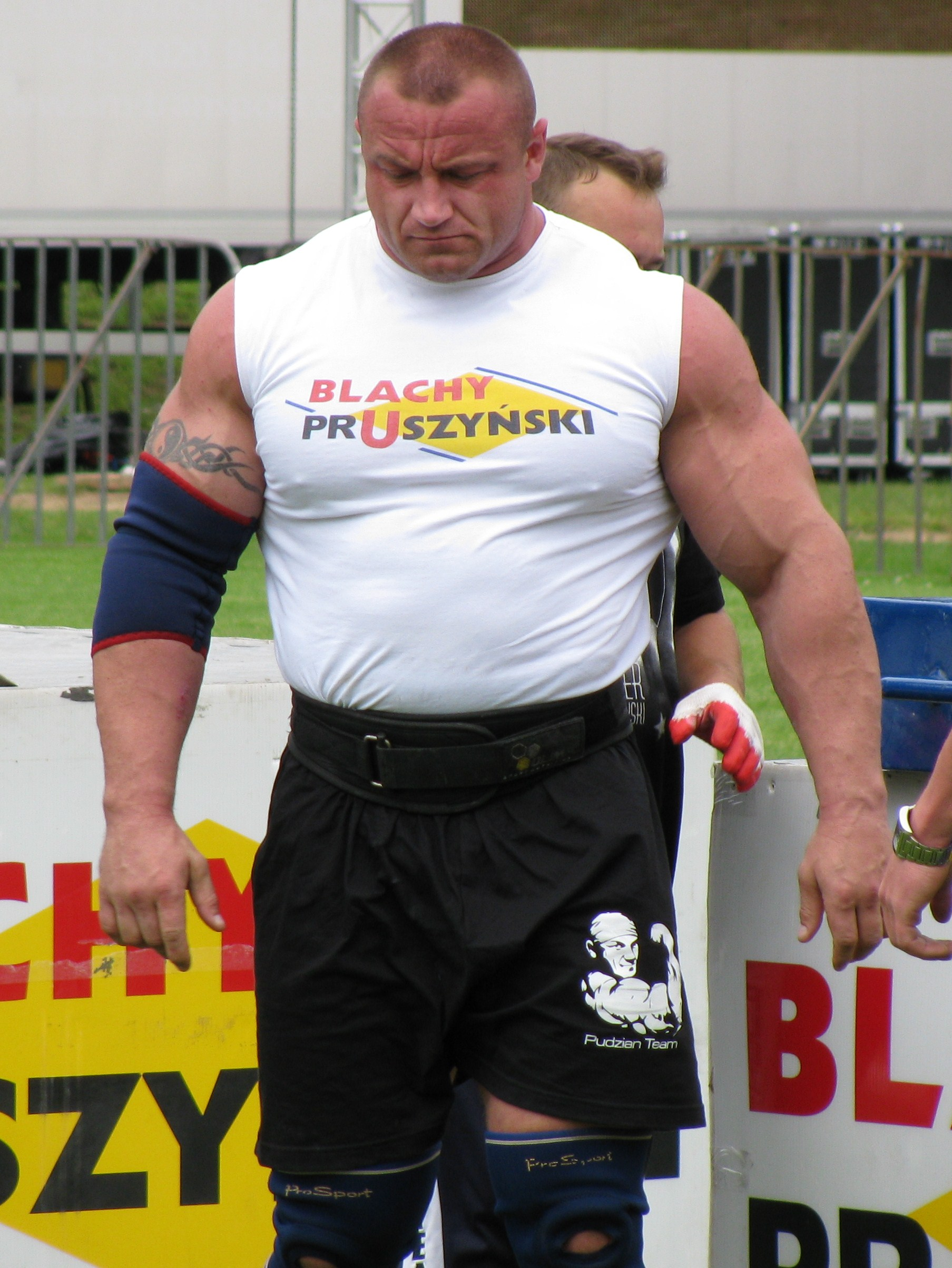
- Born: Mariusz Zbigniew Pudzianowski; 7 February 1977 (age 49); Biała Rawska, Polish People's Republic
- Other names: Pudzian
- Height: 6 ft 1 in (185 cm)
- Weight: 120–121 kg (265–267 lb) (MMA); 122–145 kg (269–320 lb) (Strongman)
- Division: Heavyweight; Super Heavyweight
- Reach: 77.6 in (197 cm)
- Stance: Orthodox
- Fighting out of: Łódź, Poland
- Team: American Top Team (2011–2012); Berkut WCA Fight Team
- Trainer: Arbi Shamaev
- Rank: Green belt in Kyokushin kaikan Purple belt in Brazilian Jiu-Jitsu
- Years active: 2009–present (MMA)

Mixed martial arts record
- Total: 28
- Wins: 17
- By knockout: 12
- By decision: 5
- Losses: 10
- By knockout: 6
- By submission: 4
- No contests: 1

Other information
- Website: www.pudzian.pl
- Mixed martial arts record from Sherdog

Mariusz Zbigniew Pudzianowski (Polish pronunciation: [ˈmarjuʂ pudʑaˈnɔfskʲi]; born 7 February 1977), also known as 'Pudzian' and 'Dominator', is a Polish former strongman and mixed martial artist. With 43 international titles at a record 70% win percentage, 58 total wins, 71 podiums and 28 world records in his strongman career.

During his career as a strongman, Pudzianowski won five World's Strongest Man titles in 2002, 2003, 2005, 2007 and 2008, the most in the 48 year history of the competition. He also won two runner-up titles in 2006 and 2009 and made 9 out of 9 appearances into the World's Strongest Man final (a feat replicated only by Hafþór Júlíus Björnsson since then). While securing eight World Strongman Cup Federation wins and twelve Strongman Super Series wins, he also won the Europe's Strongest Man title a record six times and the Poland's Strongest Man title a record seven times.

In 2009, Pudzianowski started his career as a mixed martial artist. By 2022, he had won his 17th professional fight.

== Early years ==
Mariusz Pudzianowski was born in Biała Rawska, Poland. His father, Wojciech, was a weightlifter. Pudzianowski quickly became interested in sports. Since the age of 11, he has been training the Kyokushin style of karate. His current grade is 4th kyu green belt. He began strength training at the age of thirteen. When he was fifteen, Pudzianowski also started training boxing, quitting after seven years. Pudzianowski debuted in professional sports at the age of sixteen, taking part in Polish Weightlifting Championship, in the bench press event.

=== Imprisonment ===
In 2000 and 2001, Pudzianowski spent 19 months in Łowicz prison for assault. In an interview, he said he wanted to stop a "local mafia boss", and he got accused of assault and stealing his golden chain. Pudzianowski was incarcerated in prison in Łowicz. Several years later he arranged a resocialization meeting for the prisoners at the same penal institution.

== Strongman career ==
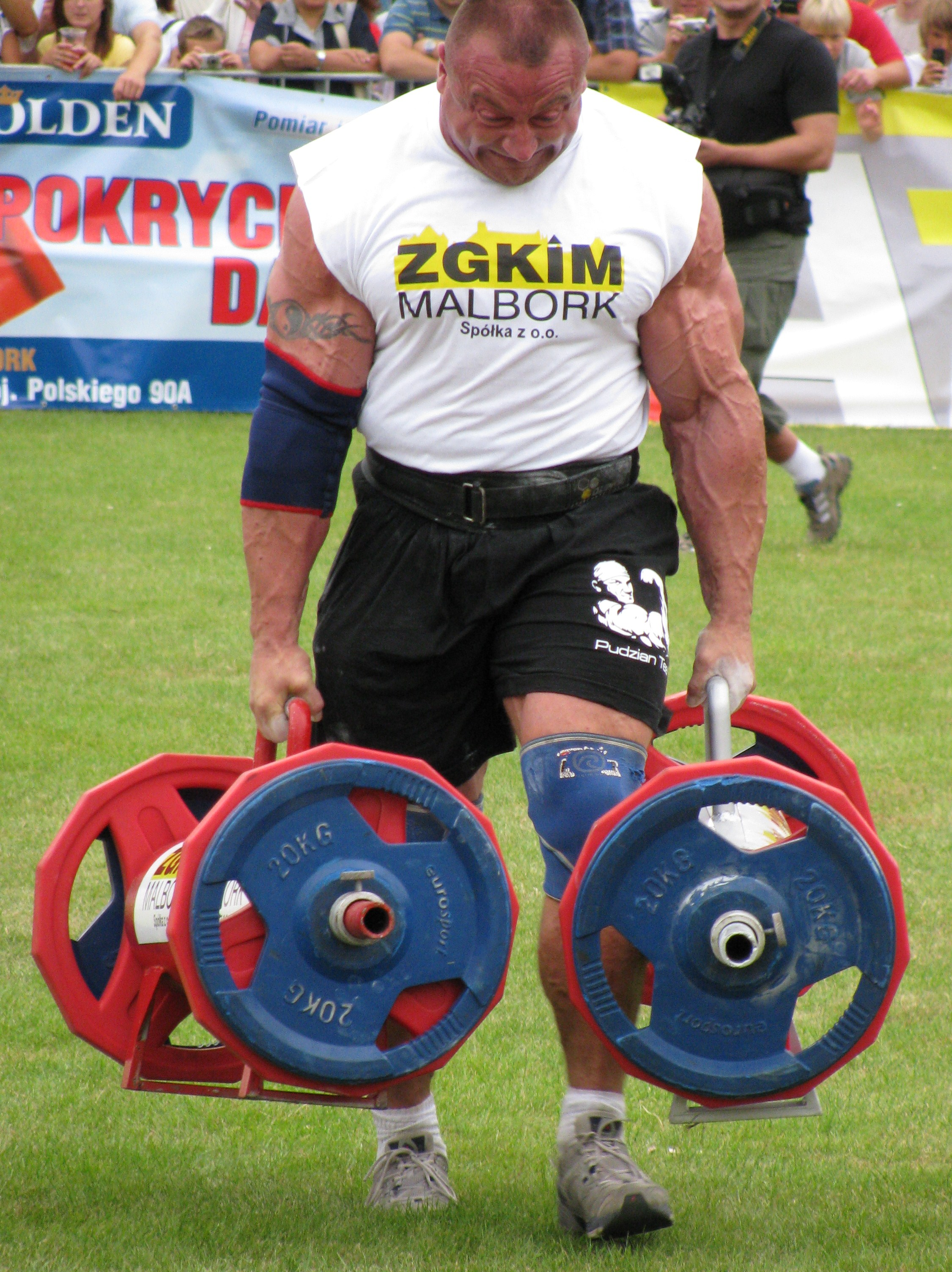
Pudzianowski performing the farmer's walk during a strongman competition in 2000.

On 1 May 1999 Pudzianowski entered his first Strongman competition, held in Płock, Poland. He achieved his first major success at the international level at the 2000 World's Strongest Man contest where he finished fourth in his first WSM competition. Due to his prison sentence, he did not return for the 2001 competition.

Pudzianowski returned at the 2002 World's Strongest Man and won his first title. He retained his title at the 2003 World's Strongest Man with an event to spare, winning by the largest margin ever achieved in the competition; across the seven disciplines in the final, he scored a remarkable four first place finishes, two second place finishes and one third place finish, resulting in the points margin between first and second (20) being greater than the margin between second and ninth (18). British strongman Laurence Shahlaei has since called this performance the most dominant victory ever seen at a World's Strongest Man event. In March 2004, he also became the Strongman Super Series World Champion.

He initially finished third in the 2004 World's Strongest Man but was later disqualified for breaching the governing body's Strongman Health Policy. He was forced to return his prize money, stripped of the International Federation of Strength Athletes points from the event, and received a one-year ban from competition. Pudzianowski did not dispute his banned substance violation and waived his right to have his stool sample verified.

In 2005, he made his return to World's Strongest Man event. After a slow start in the final's first two events, after which he found himself 7 points behind the leader in seventh place, he proceeded to dominate the rest of the event with five first place finishes in a row in the final five disciplines, winning the title with an event to spare.

In the 2006 World's Strongest Man contest, despite starting the final well, he eventually came second to Phil Pfister after the American won the final five events in a row. Pudzianowski regained his title in 2007, winning the final with one event to spare for a record-breaking third time. In so doing, he joined Jon Pall Sigmarsson and Magnus Ver Magnusson as the only men to win the competition four times. During the 2007 competition, however, Pudzianowski said that his target was to become the only person to win the event five times, and he returned to the 2008 World's Strongest Man the following year to try to achieve his goal.

Despite a serious calf injury suffered in the Polish Strongman Championship Cup of 2008 and further exacerbated during the WSM qualifying rounds, Pudzianowski still managed to win his heat and qualify for the final. However, it was clear his dominance of previous years was no longer in effect, as he only won one of the first five events in the final, and finished in fifth in two others. Trailing leader Derek Poundstone with two events to go, Pudzianowski managed to win the Plane Pull despite his injured calf to cut the deficit to just 1 point going into the final event. Matched up against Poundstone in the Atlas Stones in a 'winner-take-all' scenario, Pudzianowski managed to beat his American rival by the narrowest of margins to become the first and still only man to win five World's Strongest Man titles.

He competed in the 2009 World's Strongest Man competition the following year in Malta, trying to win a remarkable sixth title in 8 years. He eventually placed second after Žydrūnas Savickas returned to the competition to win the title for the first time. Following the competition, Pudzianowski said in an interview that he would not continue participating in strongman events, because of his career in Mixed Martial Arts, which required totally different training to strongman.

== Personal records ==
During competitions:

- Deadlift – 400 kg (882 lb) (2005 Pojedynek Gigantów)
- Keg drop Deadlift – 295–350 kg (650–771 lb) x 6 lifts in 33.89 seconds (2005 World's Strongest Man)
- Keg drop Squat – 265–340 kg (584–750 lb) x 7 reps in 21.28 seconds (2007 World's Strongest Man - Group 4)
- Keg drop Squat – 260–360 kg (573–794 lb) x 7 reps in 27.53 seconds (2005 World's Strongest Man) (former world record)
- Log lift – 172 kg (379 lb) (2005 Met-Rx Grand Prix)
- Log lift (for reps) – 130 kg (287 lb) x 14 reps (2006 Moscow Grand Prix)
- Axle press (for reps) – 140 kg (309 lb) x 11 reps (2006 WSMC Poland) (World Record)
- Apollon wheel press – 166 kg (366 lb) x 4 reps (2004 Arnold Strongman Classic)
- Viking press – 150 kg (331 lb) x 12 reps (2007 Mohegan Sun Grand Prix)
- Kettlebell press – 80 kg (176 lb) x 8 reps (2009 Globe's Strongest Man)
- Atlas Stones – 5 stones weighing 115–155 kg (254–342 lb) on tall platforms in 21.09 seconds (2006 Strongman Super Series Moscow Grand Prix) (World Record)
- Ding carry – 160 kg (353 lb) for 90 metres (2005 World's Strongest Man) (World Record)
- Asia Stone / shield carry – 175 kg (386 lb) for 127.4 metres (2002 World's Strongest Man) (World Record)
- Africa Stone carry – 175 kg (386 lb) for 110 metres (2000 World's Strongest Man - Group 5) (World Record)
- Block carry – 180 kg (397 lb) for 80 metre course in 41.32 seconds (2002 Europe's Strongest Man) (World Record)
- Fridge carry (super yoke) – 410 kg (904 lb) for 20 metres in 15.29 seconds (2005 World's Strongest Man)
- Timber carry – 392 kg (864 lb) (40' ramp) in 22.93 seconds (Raw grip) (2006 Arnold Strongman Classic)
- Wheelbarrow carry (no straps) – 300 kg (661 lb) (25m course) in 15.50 seconds (2003 IFSA Finland Grand Prix) (World Record)
- Farmer's walk (no straps) – 150 kg (331 lb) per each hand for 60m course in 19.90 seconds (2006 Strongman Super Series Poland Grand Prix) (World Record)
- Farmer's walk (no straps) – 137.5 kg (303 lb) per each hand for 70m course in 22.48 seconds (2003 Strongman Super Series Finland Grand Prix) (World Record)
- Super Yoke – 360 kg (794 lb) for 20 meters in 7.66 seconds (2006 World Strongman Cup Federation, Poland) (World Record)
- Medicine Ball Toss – 23 kg (51 lb) for 4.88 meters (2004 Arnold Strongman Classic)
- Power Stairs – (225 kg (496 lb) total of 14 steps) – 40.94 seconds (2008 World's Strongest Man) (World Record)
- Power Stairs – (230 kg (507 lb) total of 23 shallow steps) – 26.33 seconds (2006 World's Strongest Man) (World Record)
- Power Stairs – (200 kg (441 lb), 230 kg (507 lb) & 250 kg (551 lb) total of 15 high steps) – 31.22 seconds (2004 Europe's Strongest Man) (World Record)
- Power Stairs – (225 kg (496 lb), 250 kg (551 lb) & 275 kg (606 lb) total of 15 steps) – 28.56 seconds (2005 Nautilus Grand Prix) (World Record)
- Tyre Flip – 380 kg (838 lb) Tyre x 8 flips - 20.81 seconds (2004 Holland Champions Trophy) and 400 kg (882 lb) Tyre x 8 flips - 22.87 seconds (2006 Moscow Grand Prix) (former world records)
- Flip & drag – 400 kg (882 lb) tyre x 4 flips and 300 kg (661 lb) anchor & chain drag for 30 meters – 39.01 seconds (2002 World's Strongest Man) (world record)
- Conan's wheel (Basque circle) – 360 kg (794 lb) 765° rotation (2006 World Strongman Cup Russia) (World Record)
- Conan's wheel (Basque circle) – 317.5 kg (700 lb) 1,203° rotation (2003 Strongman Super Series Holland Grand Prix) (World Record)
- Conan's wheel (Basque circle) – 300 kg (661 lb) 1,440° rotation (2002 World's Strongest Man - Group 5) (former world record)
- Train pull – 16,000 kg (35,274 lb) for 25 meter course in 30.78 seconds (2003 World's Strongest Man) (World Record)
- Truck pull – 24,000 kg (52,911 lb) for 20 meter course in 26.05 seconds (2003 IFSA Strongman World Record Breakers) (World Record)
- Plane pull – 40,000 kg (88,185 lb) for 25 meter course in 36.67 seconds (2008 World's Strongest Man) (World Record)

During training: (Self-claims)

- Deadlift – 415 kg (915 lb)
- Squat – 380 kg (838 lb)
- Bench press – 290 kg (639 lb)

== Competitive record ==
Placements: 58 x 1st places, 11 x 2nd places and 2 x 3rd places = 71 x podium finishes from 80 total competitions.

- Winning percentage: 70.5% at International circuit & 78.9% at National circuit
- Podium percentage: 86.9% at International circuit & 94.7% at National circuit
- Top 5 percentage: 95.1% at International circuit & 100.0% at National circuit

	1st	2nd	3rd	Podium	4th	5th	Top 5	6th	7th	8th	9th	10th	Total
International	43	9	1	53	3	2	58	2				1	61
National	15	2	1	18	1		19						19
Combined	58	11	2	71	4	2	77	2				1	80

=== Track record ===
Competition	Location	Outcome	Date
(Malta) World's Strongest Man	Valletta, Malta	2nd place	10 March 2009
(United States) World's Strongest Man	Charleston, West Virginia, USA	Winner	2008
(Belarus) World Strongman Federation Grand Prix	Silichy, Belarus	Winner	8 March 2008
Poland Cup	Poland	Winner	
(Russia) World Strongman Federation Grand Prix	Russia	Winner	2008
Poland vs. The World	Poland	Winner	2008
(United States) Mohegan Sun Super Series Grand Prix	Uncasville, Connecticut, USA	2nd place	2008-01-19
(United States) World's Strongest Man	Anaheim, California, USA	Winner	2007
(Norway) Svend Karlsens Super Series Grand Prix	Norway	Winner	2007
(United States) Venice Beach Super Series Grand Prix	Venice Beach, California, USA	2nd place	2007
(United States) Mohegan Sun Super Series Grand Prix	Uncasville, Connecticut, USA	Winner	2007
(Poland) European Championship	Poland	Winner	2007
(England) World Strongman Cup Grand Prix	England	Winner	2007
(Latvia) World Strongman Cup Grand Prix	Latvia	Winner	2007
(China) World's Strongest Man	Sanya, China	2nd place	2006
Poland Super Series Grand Prix	Poland	Winner	2006
(Russia) Moscow Super Series Grand Prix	Moscow, Russia	Winner	2006
(United States) Mohegan Sun Super Series Grand Prix	Uncasville, Connecticut, USA	Winner	2006
(Russia) World Strongman Cup Grand Prix	Russia	Winner	2006
(Poland) World Strongman Cup Grand Prix	Poland	Winner	2006
(Latvia) World Strongman Cup Grand Prix	Latvia	Winner	2006
(Belarus) World Strongman Cup Grand Prix	Belarus	Winner	2006
(United States) Arnold's Strongest Man	Columbus, Ohio, USA	6th place	2005
(China) World's Strongest Man	Chengdu, China	Winner	2005
Poland vs. The World	Poland	Winner	2005
(United States) Mohegan Sun Super Series Grand Prix	Uncasville, Connecticut, USA	Winner	2005
Sweden Super Series Grand Prix	Sweden	Winner	2005
Poland Super Series Grand Prix	Poland	Winner	2005
(United States) Venice Beach Super Series Grand Prix	Venice Beach, California, USA	Winner	2005
(Austria) World Strongman Cup Grand Prix	Austria	Winner	2005
(United States) Arnold's Strongest Man	Columbus, Ohio, USA	4th place	2004
(The Bahamas) World's Strongest Man	Nassau, Paradise Island, The Bahamas	Disqualified (originally 3rd place)	2004
(Poland) European Championship	Jelenia Góra, Poland	Winner	2004
(Poland) World Team Championship	Płock, Poland	Winner	2004
(Russia) Moscow Super Series Grand Prix	Moscow, Russia	Winner	2004
(Poland) Polish Cup	Poland	Winner	2004
(Zambia) World's Strongest Man	Victoria Falls, Zambia	Winner	2003
(Poland) European Championship	Sandomierz, Poland	Winner	2003
(Hungary) World Team Championship	Hungary	Winner	2003
(Finland) Ylitornio Challenge	Finland	Winner	2003
(Poland) World Record Breakers	Gdynia, Poland	Winner	2003
(Poland) Polish Cup	Poland	Winner	2003
(United States) Arnold's Strongest Man	Columbus, Ohio, USA	5th place	2003
Finland Super Series Grand Prix	Finland	2nd place	2003
Canada Super Series Grand Prix	Canada	2nd place	2003
(Netherlands) Holland Super Series Grand Prix	Holland	Winner	2003
(United States) Hawaii Super Series Grand Prix	Hawaii, USA	Winner	2003
(Malaysia) World's Strongest Man	Kuala Lumpur, Malaysia	Winner	2002
(United States) Hawaii Super Series Grand Prix	Hawaii, USA	3rd place	2002
Sweden Super Series Grand Prix	Sweden	5th place	2002
(Poland) European Championship	Gdynia, Poland	Winner	2002
(Poland) Polish Cup	Poland	2nd place	2002
(Hungary) World Team Championship	Hungary	3rd place	2002
(Republic of Ireland) World's Giants	Ireland	Winner	2002
(South Africa) World's Strongest Man	Sun City, South Africa	4th place	2000
(Finland) Helsinki Grand Prix	Finland	10th place	2000
(Hungary) World Team Championship	Hungary	2nd place	2000
(Poland) World Cup Grand Prix	Poland	Winner	2000
(China) World Team Championship	China	3rd place	1999
(Poland) Polish Cup	Poland	Winner	1999

== Mixed martial arts ==
In 2009, Pudzianowski signed a contract with Konfrontacja Sztuk Walki – a Polish mixed martial arts organization – to take part in four fights.

He debuted as a mixed martial arts fighter on 11 December 2009, during the KSW 12 event in Warsaw, Poland, winning against Marcin Najman. Pudzianowski started throwing low kicks soon after the fight began. After several hits, Najman fell to the mat and Pudzianowski started delivering punches (a tactic known as ground-and-pound). Najman was forced to tap the mat, indicating he wanted to end the fight, which lasted for only 43 seconds. Pudzianowski collected 200,000 zlotys (US$70,000) for the fight.

On 7 May 2010, during the KSW 13 event, Pudzianowski won his second fight, against Yusuke Kawaguchi. The fight lasted two full rounds, with Pudzianowski winning by judges' decision. The fight was described as a "sloppy brawl". It was noted Pudzianowski had control over most of the fight, but was "neutralized" by Kawaguchi, and that, by the second round, he was looking "to be out of energy and breathing heavily".

On 21 May 2010, Pudzianowski went on to participate in the Moosin: God of Martial Arts event, where he fought former two time UFC Heavyweight Champion Tim Sylvia. Pudzianowski fractured his metatarsus during the first round and then went on to deplete his stamina during the rest of the fight, which ultimately led to Sylvia defeating him via submission at 1:43 of round 2.

Following his loss to Sylvia in May, Pudzianowski signed to face former heavyweight boxer and kickboxer Eric Esch, better known as 'Butterbean', at KSW 14 on 18 September. After several brief standup exchanges, Pudzianowski secured a takedown early in the fight and was then able to dominate Esch with ground and pound. Esch, unable to get back to his feet during the attack, tapped out to the strikes, making Pudzianowski the winner by submission at 1:15 of the first round. He came into the fight notably slimmer, having lost around 20 lbs from his previous fight. Many believe his large muscle mass to have caused his stamina problems in his earlier fights.

On 21 May 2011 Pudzianowski fought James Thompson at KSW 16, losing by arm triangle.

In September 2011 Mariusz Pudzianowski started professional training in the well known MMA camp in the USA – American Top Team.

Pudzianowski fought on the KSW 17 event, which was held on 26 November 2011. He faced James Thompson in a rematch. He won the fight via majority decision. This decision caused controversy as Thompson had virtually full control in both rounds, and after the fight Thompson, who was clearly angered by the decision, took the microphone from the announcer and launched a verbal assault directed at the promotion in which he ranted: "F...g joke. Give Mariusz a big round of applause. Come on. What a f...g joke. I thought KSW was really trying to be serious. If you can watch that back and call that serious, then (looking at the promoter) you're f...d, and KSW is going down the f...g toilet." Two days later the promotion changed the result to a No Contest. During a conference held on 28 November, the ruling was deemed to be a "judge's error" and the fight result was changed.

Mariusz's next opponent was Bob Sapp in a fight took place in Łódź, Poland on KSW 19 on 12 May 2012. Mariusz won via a TKO in the first round, battering Sapp with a barrage of punching and securing a takedown followed with more punches to win just 39 seconds into the fight.

Mariusz then faced Christos Piliafas on 15 September in the main event of KSW 20. Mariusz won via TKO in the first round, after dominating Piliafas on his feet, he then secured a takedown followed by posturing up and raining down some ground and pound to win at 3:48 seconds into the fight.

On 8 June 2013, Pudzianowski fought Sean McCorkle at KSW 23, losing the bout in the first round by kimura submission. Pudzianowski fought McCorkle again in a rematch on 28 September at KSW 24, avenging his loss via unanimous decision. After the second fight, Sean McCorkle expressed interest in a third fight.

On 17 May 2014 at KSW 27, Pudzianowski defeated Oli Thompson via a 2nd round unanimous decision. During the fight, Pudzianowski was able to gain points by controlling the entire fight through landing punches and securing multiple takedowns in both rounds eventually leading to his victory. At the end, Thompson requested a rematch, to which Pudzianowski agreed.

On 6 December 2014, Pudzianowski defeated the olympic veteran Paweł Nastula via unanimous decision on KSW 29's co-main event. It was his third win in a row.

Pudzianowski next fought Rolles Gracie Jr. in KSW 31, on 23 May 2015 in Gdańsk, Poland. He defeated Gracie Jr. via knockout in the 1st round, winning the Knockout of the Night bonus award with the performance.

At KSW 32 on 31 October 2015, Pudzianowski lost to Peter Graham via TKO in the second round.

Then on 27 May 2016 at KSW 35 against Marcin Różalski, he lost also in the second round this time by guillotine choke.

In his next fight in KSW 37 on 3 December 2016 Pudzianowski defeated Paweł Mikołajuw with TKO in the first round.

On 27 May 2017 at KSW 39 Pudzianowski defeated Tyberiusz Kowalczyk via submission to elbow strike in the second round.

Pudzianowski was expected to face James McSweeney at KSW 40 on 22 October 2017. However, after McSweeney was medically cleared, he eventually faced Jay Silva and won by majority decision.

Mariusz faced Karol Bedorf on 9 June 2018 at KSW 44: The Game. He lost the bout via first round kimura.

Mariusz faced Szymon Kołecki in a heavyweight bout at KSW 47 on 23 March 2019. Pudzianowski lost the fight after suffering a leg injury in the first round.

=== Winning streak ===
Next, Pudzian faced former bodybuilder Erko Jun on 9 November 2019 at KSW 51: Croatia. He won the bout via second round TKO.

Pudzianowski was then scheduled to headline KSW 53 against Quentin Domingos on 21 March 2020 before the bout was scrapped due to Pudzianowski's injury.

Pudzianowski was set to return after a fifteen month layoff against the undefeated Senegalese heavyweight Serigne Ousmane at KSW 59: Fight Code on 20 March 2021. However, on the day of the fight, Ousmane Dia suffered an acute appendicitis attack and had to be hospitalized. Stepping in on just a few hours notice was Serbia's Nikola Milanovic. Pudzianowski won the bout via TKO in the first round.

Pudzianowski faced KSW 1 tournament winner Łukasz Jurkowski on 5 June 2021 at KSW 63: Crime of The Century. Pudzianowski won the fight via TKO in the 3rd round.

The fight with Serigne Ousmane Dia was then rebooked and took place at KSW 64: Przybysz vs. Santos on 23 October 2021. Pudzianowski won the fight via knockout 18 seconds into round one.

Pudzianowski faced former KSW Middleweight champion Michał Materla at KSW 70: Pudzianowski vs. Materla on 28 May 2022. He won the bout in the first round, knocking out Materla with an uppercut. He was awarded the Knockout of the Night bonus with the win.

Pudzianowski faced former two-division champion Mamed Khalidov at KSW 77: Khalidov vs. Pudzianowski on 17 December 2022. Pudzian's 6-win streak was ended after he tapped to ground and pound in the first round.

Pudzianowski faced boxer-turned-mixed martial artist Artur Szpilka at XTB KSW 83: Colosseum 2 on 3 June 2023. He lost the bout via technical knockout in the second round.

Pudzianowski returned from an almost two year layoff to face another former World's Strongest Man, Eddie Hall, at KSW 105, on 26 April 2025. The bout was contested at Super Heavyweight, with two four-minute rounds. Pudzianowski was finished in the first round, being hurt by a right hand from Hall almost immediately, before succumbing to ground and pound 30 seconds in.

== Championships and accomplishments ==
- Konfrontacja Sztuk Walki
  - Knockout of the Night (Two times) vs. Rolles Gracie Jr. and Michał Materla
  - Most wins in Konfrontacja Sztuk Walki heavyweight history (17).
  - Most knockouts in Konfrontacja Sztuk Walki heavyweight history (12).
  - Most knockouts in Konfrontacja Sztuk Walki history (12).
  - Most consecutive knockouts in Konfrontacja Sztuk Walki history (5).
  - Third most wins in Konfrontacja Sztuk Walki history (17).
  - Third most fights in Konfrontacja Sztuk Walki history (24).
- World MMA Awards
  - 2021 Upset of the Year - Nominee

== Mixed martial arts record ==
Professional record breakdown
28 matches	17 wins	10 losses
By knockout	12	6
By submission	0	4
By decision	5	0
No contests	1	

Res.	Record	Opponent	Method	Event	Date	Round	Time	Location	Notes
Loss	17–10 (1)	Eddie Hall	TKO (punches)	KSW 105	26 April 2025	1	0:30	Gliwice, Poland	Super Heavyweight bout.
Loss	17–9 (1)	Artur Szpilka	TKO (punches)	KSW 83	3 June 2023	2	0:31	Warsaw, Poland	
Loss	17–8 (1)	Mamed Khalidov	TKO (submission to punches)	KSW 77	17 December 2022	1	1:54	Gliwice, Poland	
Win	17–7 (1)	Michał Materla	KO (punch)	KSW 70	28 May 2022	1	1:47	Łódź, Poland	Knockout of the Night.
Win	16–7 (1)	Serigne Ousmane Dia	KO (punch)	KSW 64	23 October 2021	1	0:18	Łódź, Poland	Super Heavyweight bout.
Win	15–7 (1)	Łukasz Jurkowski	TKO (punches)	KSW 61	5 June 2021	3	1:32	Gdańsk, Poland	
Win	14–7 (1)	Nikola Milanović	TKO (punches)	KSW 59	20 March 2021	1	1:10	Łódź, Poland	Openweight bout.
Win	13–7 (1)	Erko Jun	TKO (punches)	KSW 51	9 November 2019	2	1:43	Zagreb, Croatia	
Loss	12–7 (1)	Szymon Kołecki	TKO (leg injury)	KSW 47	23 March 2019	1	4:29	Łódź, Poland	
Loss	12–6 (1)	Karol Bedorf	Submission (kimura)	KSW 44	9 June 2018	1	1:51	Gdańsk, Poland	
Win	12–5 (1)	Jay Silva	Decision (majority)	KSW 40	22 October 2017	3	5:00	Dublin, Ireland	
Win	11–5 (1)	Tyberiusz Kowalczyk	TKO (submission to punches)	KSW 39	27 May 2017	2	2:50	Warsaw, Poland	
Win	10–5 (1)	Paweł Mikołajuw	TKO (punches)	KSW 37	3 December 2016	1	1:20	Kraków, Poland	
Loss	9–5 (1)	Marcin Różalski	Submission (guillotine choke)	KSW 35	27 May 2016	2	1:46	Gdańsk, Poland	
Loss	9–4 (1)	Peter Graham	TKO (punches and elbows)	KSW 32	31 October 2015	2	2:00	London, England	
Win	9–3 (1)	Rolles Gracie Jr.	KO (punch)	KSW 31	23 May 2015	1	0:27	Gdańsk, Poland	Knockout of the Night.
Win	8–3 (1)	Paweł Nastula	Decision (unanimous)	KSW 29	6 December 2014	3	3:00	Kraków, Poland	Super Heavyweight bout.
Win	7–3 (1)	Oli Thompson	Decision (unanimous)	KSW 27	17 May 2014	2	5:00	Gdańsk, Poland	Heavyweight debut.
Win	6–3 (1)	Sean McCorkle	Decision (unanimous)	KSW 24	28 September 2013	2	5:00	Łódź, Poland	
Loss	5–3 (1)	Sean McCorkle	Submission (kimura)	KSW 23	8 June 2013	1	1:57	Gdańsk, Poland	
Win	5–2 (1)	Christos Piliafas	TKO (punches)	KSW 20	15 September 2012	1	3:48	Gdańsk, Poland	
Win	4–2 (1)	Bob Sapp	TKO (punches)	KSW 19	12 May 2012	1	0:39	Łódź, Poland	
NC	3–2 (1)	James Thompson	NC (overturned)	KSW 17	26 November 2011	2	5:00	Łódź, Poland	Return to Openweight. Originally a unanimous decision win for Pudzianowski; overturned due to a judging error.
Loss	3–2	James Thompson	Submission (arm-triangle choke)	KSW 16	21 May 2011	2	1:06	Gdańsk, Poland	
Win	3–1	Eric Esch	TKO (submission to punches)	KSW 14	18 September 2010	1	1:15	Łódź, Poland	Openweight bout.
Loss	2–1	Tim Sylvia	TKO (submission to punches)	Moosin: God of Martial Arts	21 May 2010	2	1:43	Worcester, Massachusetts, United States	Super Heavyweight debut.
Win	2–0	Yusuke Kawaguchi	Decision (unanimous)	KSW 13	6 May 2010	2	5:00	Katowice, Poland	
Win	1–0	Marcin Najman	TKO (submission to punches)	KSW 12	11 December 2009	1	0:43	Warsaw, Poland	Openweight debut.

== Outside professional sports ==
=== Education ===
On 27 May 2008 Pudzianowski graduated with a master's degree in international relations. His thesis was: "Organizational culture in sports marketing in the world".

=== Business ===
In an interview in 2009 Mariusz said that he treats the sport as a hobby. He is not doing it for money, as the money is relatively low in Strongman and MMA (he said that the winner of World's Strongest Man can get US$60,000, and the winner of Grand Prix in the US can get anywhere from US$100,000 to $150,000). He owns a school for bodyguards as well as real estate. Those are his main sources of money. Pudzianowski also owns a truck cargo company named Pudzianowski Transport.

=== Musical career ===
Pudzianowski often appears as a guest singer in the musical group Pudzian Band, formed by his brother Krystian. Their first single Zdobyć świat (To conquer the world), was released in 2006. In 2009, the group released an album, Dawaj na ring (Go, hit the ring).

=== Celebrity status ===
In 2008, Pudzianowski took part in the 7th season of Dancing with the Stars in his native Poland. He advanced to the final episode, but ultimately finished second, losing to actress Magdalena Walach. Pudzianowski was a contestant in the 1st season of the singing reality show Just the Two of Us in Poland. He was coupled with former Ich Troje singer Anna Wiśniewska.

=== Rugby ===
Pudzianowski is also a keen amateur rugby union player, and plays with Blachy Pruszyński Budowlani Łódź.

=== Strongman diet ===
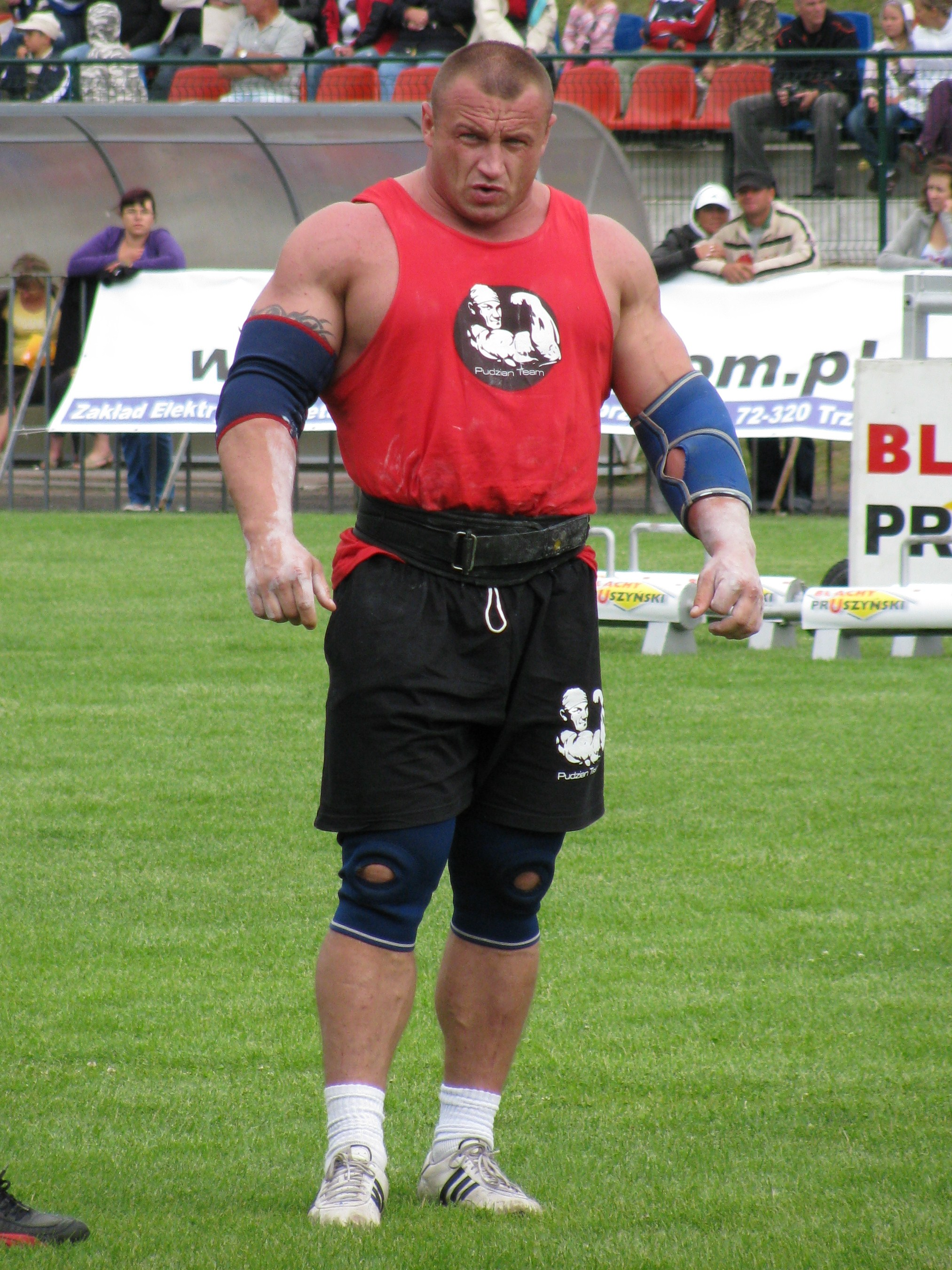
Mariusz Pudzianowski

Pudzianowski is liberal with his diet and is often seen eating chocolate, ice cream or burgers. On one of the World Strongman events shown on TV, and an interview for MTV, when asked about his diet he said: "I eat everything. I do not follow any particular diet. I eat anything I want, anytime I want".

My energy comes from my diet. Breakfast is 10 eggs and two to three pounds of bacon. Between meals, I eat lots of candy. In the morning, it will be several 3 Musketeers and/or Snickers bars; I need them for energy. Lunch, at 1 or 2 PM, is a double meal of a Polish pork chop, sauerkraut and potatoes. An hour later, I work out, then take lots of supplements: magnesium, creatine,[sic] amino acids, all that stuff, and more chocolate. Dinner is whatever meat I can grab—steaks, pork chops, bacon—plus more sauerkraut and potatoes. At 9 or 10 PM, I work out again. Afterward, I have a protein shake and more chocolate. At 3 or 4 AM, I wake up and have more chocolate, then go back to sleep until morning.

He said for MTV that he prefers Polish cuisine. When he has some time he often cooks himself, as he does not particularly fancy meals from restaurants. He often eats bigos, Polish soups, Polish sausages and typical Polish dinners with cooked potatoes, 200–300 g of meat and some salads (usually cucumber salad).

In an interview at the beginning of his world strongman career he said that his supplements, training, massages, etc. costs him approximately 6000 złoty (c. U.S. $2,000) per month.

== Commercials ==
- "Dominator" – an energy drink using Pudzianowski's profile is being distributed in Poland.
- Mariusz appeared in a Met-rx commercial which aired during the U.S. broadcast of the 2007 World's Strongest Man contest.

== See also ==
- List of current KSW fighters
- List of male mixed martial artists
- List of strongmen
- List of Poles
