= Sean McCorkle =

American MMA fighter

- Born: July 17, 1976 (age 50); Indianapolis, Indiana, United States
- Other names: Big Sexy
- Nationality: American
- Height: 6 ft 7 in (201 cm)
- Weight: 315 lb (143 kg; 22 st 7 lb)
- Division: Super Heavyweight; Heavyweight
- Reach: 81 in (206 cm)
- Stance: Orthodox
- Fighting out of: Indianapolis, Indiana, United States
- Team: Team James Clingerman
- Years active: 2005-2007, 2010-2014

Mixed martial arts record
- Total: 27
- Wins: 20
- By knockout: 11
- By submission: 8
- By decision: 1
- Losses: 7
- By knockout: 3
- By submission: 3
- By decision: 1

Other information
- Mixed martial arts record from Sherdog

Sean McCorkle (born July 17, 1976) is a retired American professional mixed martial artist who last competed in the Super Heavyweight division. A professional from 2005 until 2014, he competed for the UFC, Bellator, KSW, and King of the Cage.

== Background ==
McCorkle is from Indianapolis, Indiana. He excelled at basketball, playing in high school and then in junior college. In 2005, McCorkle began training in Brazilian jiu-jitsu, and later met local UFC veterans Chris Lytle and Jake O'Brien before transitioning into mixed martial arts.

== Mixed martial arts career ==
McCorkle fought out of C-4 MMA. He fought at Super Heavyweight for most of his career, weighing as much as 320 lbs. McCorkle has several nicknames, but "Big Sexy" is his best known moniker. MMA journalist Ariel Helwani coined his other main nickname "The Curtain Jerker" during a pre-fight interview. He was also known as "The Hater" early on in his career.

After winning his first four fights, McCorkle faced Jeremy Norton on New Year's Eve 2006. During the bout, McCorkle dislocated his shoulder and broke his arm, but was able to continue and took a split decision victory. Due to the injury, he was out of action for fourteen months of physical therapy before he could return to MMA.

=== Legends of Fighting ===
McCorkle fought multiple times for an Indianapolis promotion called Legends of Fighting and remained undefeated with them, holding a 9–0 record and the promotion's Super Heavyweight Championship belt.

=== King of the Cage ===
On October 7, 2006, McCorkle fought Robert Hogan at King Of The Cage: Meltdown, winning via TKO (punches) in the opening round.

=== Ultimate Fighting Championship ===
McCorkle signed a contract with the UFC in July 2010. After signing, his debut opponent was announced as the K-1 and Pride Fighting Championships veteran Mark Hunt at UFC 119 in McCorkle's hometown of Indianapolis. In order to make weight for the fight, McCorkle had to cut down to 265 lbs - a weight he had not hit since the age of 18. When the fight began, Hunt landed several punches and was able to land on top when McCorkle went for a takedown. McCorkle won the fight in just 67 seconds however, after locking in a straight armbar from his back. It was later revealed that McCorkle's armlock had caused significant damage to Hunt. In his post-fight interview with Joe Rogan, McCorkle lauded how hard Hunt's punches were.

Due to his colorful persona and the sudden publicity he received for his win over Hunt, McCorkle's next fight was the Co-Main Event of UFC 124. He fought 6'11" Dutch fighter Stefan Struve in Montreal, Quebec. McCorkle initiated an extreme trash talk battle in the media leading up to the bout, which was a new and unpleasant experience for the usually reserved Struve. After McCorkle unleashed a continual barrage of taunts via his Twitter account, Struve issued a contest in which fans would Photoshop insulting pictures of McCorkle. The winner of the contest was promised the bloodstained fight gloves Struve was to use against McCorkle. The eventual winner of the contest submitted a picture of McCorkle as Justin Bieber, which led McCorkle to show up at the weigh-ins wearing a Bieber-style wig for photographers. When making his ring entrance, Struve's skin had noticeably broken out in hives. He later said this was from the stress and pressure he felt to win. McCorkle came out strong in the opening minutes of the bout, forcefully slamming Struve onto the ground and securing a kimura on him that nearly led to a tap out. After a struggle that sapped McCorkle of his energy, Struve was able to reverse the hold and pound him out, winning the fight by TKO.

McCorkle next fought Christian Morecraft on March 26, 2011, at UFC Fight Night 24. After a closely contested first round, Morecraft came out and dominated the first four minutes of the second round. The referee briefly stopped the fight for two minutes after Morecraft delivered an illegal low blow to McCorkle's groin. When the action resumed, McCorkle dove in for a takedown but Morecraft was able to leverage this attempt into a standing guillotine choke that left McCorkle unconscious.

In the spring of 2011, the UFC released McCorkle from his contract. On October 17, 2011, ESPN announced that Sean McCorkle would be a featured heavyweight in the video game UFC Undisputed 3. The game was released for Xbox 360 and PlayStation 3 on February 14, 2012. The game went on to sell over one million copies.

=== Bellator Fighting Championships ===
After his release from the UFC, McCorkle won his next six fights with various promotions. He then signed to Bellator Fighting Championships, and on March 9, 2012, at Bellator 60 he made his debut in a catchweight fight against Richard White, winning via first round submission.

=== Rivalry with "The World's Strongest Man" ===
Immediately after his win at Bellator 60, McCorkle lost three straight fights for the first time in his career. He then signed with Polish promotion KSW to face the five time World's Strongest Man, Mariusz Pudzianowski. With McCorkle seeming to be at a low point in his career, many fight observers did not expect much from him in the bout.

The two met at KSW 23 on June 8, 2013. When the fight began, Pudzianowski came out swinging and took it straight to McCorkle. The two struggled fiercely, with Pudzianowski controlling the tempo of the match until he stepped into a hard jab from McCorkle which subsequently dropped Pudzianowski. McCorkle was able to quickly capitalize and locked in a kimura, submitting Pudzianowski.

The unexpected outcome of the fight made news immediately, and the notoriety of the bout led both men to agree to a rematch. McCorkle and Pudzianowski met again at KSW 24 on September 28, 2013. According to sports writer Chuck Mindenhall, "The two met like titanic slabs in the middle of the ring." Pudzianowski was able to take the fight to the ground, where he remained on top as the two grappled for the remainder of the first round. The scene repeated itself in the second round, but midway through McCorkle went for a kimura and was able to reverse Pudzianowski and end up on top. The fight was only scheduled for two rounds, and Pudzianowski took the decision victory.

After the fight, McCorkle asked KSW for a third match with Pudzianowski, which was never granted.

=== Professional Wrestling ===
Sean McCorkle also made appearances for Freedom Pro Wrestling, a promotion based in Wisconsin. On April 20, 2012, McCorkle won his debut match against C.J. O'Doyle, the promotion's current heavyweight champion. McCorkle was called "a smack-talking jobber."

=== Retirement ===
On September 29, 2014, Sean McCorkle officially announced his retirement at the age of 38 during a light-hearted interview on The MMA Hour with Ariel Helwani. He also admitted he had been suffering from "miserable" back injuries for some time. McCorkle said he is currently focused on managing other fighters.

== Championships and accomplishments ==
- Ultimate Fighting Championship
  - UFC.com Awards
    - 2010: Ranked #5 Upset of the Year vs. Mark Hunt

== Mixed martial arts record ==
Professional record breakdown
27 matches	20 wins	7 losses
By knockout	11	3
By submission	8	3
By decision	1	1

Res.	Record	Opponent	Method	Event	Date	Round	Time	Location	Notes
Loss	20–7	Richard White	Submission (armbar)	Square Ring Promotions: Island Fights 30	September 20, 2014	1	3:03	Pensacola, Florida, United States	Super Heavyweight bout.
Loss	20–6	Mariusz Pudzianowski	Decision (unanimous)	KSW 24	September 28, 2013	2	5:00	Łódź, Poland	Open Weight bout.
Win	20–5	Mariusz Pudzianowski	Submission (kimura)	KSW 23	June 8, 2013	1	1:57	Gdańsk, Poland	Open Weight bout.
Loss	19–5	Satoshi Ishii	Submission (kimura)	IGF: GENOME 24	February 23, 2013	1	2:41	Tokyo, Japan	
Loss	19–4	Soa Palelei	TKO (punches)	Australian Fighting Championship 4	December 7, 2012	1	1:45	Melbourne, Australia	For the AFC Heavyweight Championship.
Loss	19–3	Brian Heden	TKO (punches)	WMMA 1	March 31, 2012	2	2:44	El Paso, Texas, United States	Super Heavyweight bout.
Win	19–2	Richard White	Submission (neck crank)	Bellator 60	March 9, 2012	1	1:02	Hammond, Indiana, United States	Catchweight (285 lbs) bout.
Win	18–2	Mike Williams	Submission (arm-triangle choke)	Legends of Fighting 51: Little Giants	February 10, 2012	1	1:29	Indianapolis, Indiana, United States	
Win	17–2	Mike Gordon	Submission (arm-triangle choke)	North American Allied Fight Series: Caged Fury 16	January 28, 2012	1	2:14	Morgantown, West Virginia, United States	Super Heavyweight bout.
Win	16–2	Justin Grizzard	Submission (kimura)	Chicago Cagefighting Championship 4	October 15, 2011	1	1:57	Villa Park, Illinois, United States	Super Heavyweight bout.
Win	15–2	Alex Rozman	TKO (submission to punches)	Legends of Fighting 48: Mega	August 19, 2011	1	1:29	Indianapolis, Indiana, United States	
Win	14–2	Cameron Befort	Submission (kimura)	CFA 02: McCorkle vs. Befort	July 23, 2011	1	1:12	Miami, Florida, United States	
Loss	13–2	Christian Morecraft	Technical Submission (standing guillotine choke)	UFC Fight Night: Nogueira vs. Davis	March 26, 2011	2	4:10	Seattle, Washington, United States	
Loss	13–1	Stefan Struve	TKO (punches)	UFC 124	December 11, 2010	1	3:55	Montreal, Quebec, Canada	
Win	13–0	Mark Hunt	Submission (straight armbar)	UFC 119	September 25, 2010	1	1:07	Indianapolis, Indiana, United States	
Win	12–0	Johnathan Ivey	TKO (punches)	Legends of Fighting 39	May 28, 2010	2	3:21	Indianapolis, Indiana, United States	
Win	11–0	Bobby Favors	TKO (punches)	Legends of Fighting 38	April 29, 2010	1	1:39	Indianapolis, Indiana, United States	
Win	10–0	Joe Mellotte	TKO (submission to punches)	Legends of Fighting 37	February 26, 2010	1	0:29	Indianapolis, Indiana, United States	
Win	9–0	John Evans	KO (punches)	Legends of Fighting Revolutions 6	August 22, 2009	1	0:14	Indianapolis, Indiana, United States	
Win	8–0	Raymond Black	TKO (submission to punches)	Legends of Fighting Revolution 5	August 9, 2009	1	0:52	Indianapolis, Indiana, United States	
Win	7–0	Matt Shyrock	TKO (submission to punches)	Legends of Fighting:	January 9, 2008	1	0:59	Indianapolis, Indiana, United States	
Win	6–0	James Ferguson	Submission (kimura)	Legends of Fighting 19: Back in Action	July 27, 2007	2	1:28	Indianapolis, Indiana, United States	
Win	5–0	Jeremy Norton	Decision (split)	Legends of Fighting 12: Black Tie Battles	December 31, 2006	3	5:00	Indianapolis, Indiana, United States	
Win	4–0	Justin Wade	TKO (submission to punches)	Legends of Fighting 11: Total Chaos	December 8, 2006	1	1:51	Indianapolis, Indiana, United States	
Win	3–0	Robert Hogan	TKO (punches)	KOTC: Meltdown	October 7, 2006	1	0:30	Indianapolis, Indiana, United States	
Win	2–0	Jason Johnson	TKO (punches)	Battle Ground 3	December 9, 2005	1	1:05	Indianapolis, Indiana, United States	
Win	1–0	Shane Paulson	TKO (submission to punches)	Legends of Fighting 2	October 21, 2005	1	0:32	Indianapolis, Indiana, United States	

== See also ==
- List of current UFC fighters
- List of male mixed martial artists
