= Mark Hunt =

New Zealand martial artist and kickboxer

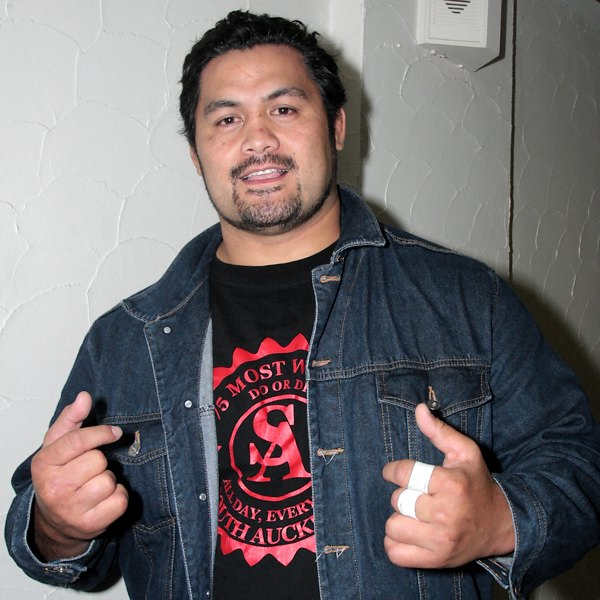
- Hunt in 2007
- Born: 23 March 1974 (age 52); South Auckland, New Zealand
- Other names: The Super Samoan
- Height: 5 ft 10 in (178 cm)
- Weight: 265 lb (120 kg; 18 st 13 lb)
- Division: Heavyweight (kickboxing); Heavyweight (MMA)
- Reach: 72 in (183 cm)
- Style: Kickboxing, Boxing
- Fighting out of: Sydney, New South Wales, Australia
- Team: Oceania Super Fighter Gym; Liverpool Kickboxing Gym; Tony Mundine Boxing Club; American Top Team; Oliver MMA; AKA Thailand
- Trainer: Hape Nganoroa; Marcelo Rezende; Tony Mundine; Ricardo Liborio; Marco Gigante Villela; Steve Oliver; Jayson Vemoa; Lolo Heimuli
- Rank: Purple belt in Brazilian Jiu-Jitsu
- Years active: 1998, 2000, 2020–present (Boxing); 1999–2003, 2008 (Kickboxing); 2004–2006, 2008–2018 (MMA)

Professional boxing record
- Total: 4
- Wins: 1
- By knockout: 1
- Losses: 2
- Draws: 1

Kickboxing record
- Total: 43
- Wins: 30
- By knockout: 13
- Losses: 13
- By knockout: 2

Mixed martial arts record
- Total: 29
- Wins: 13
- By knockout: 10
- By decision: 3
- Losses: 14
- By knockout: 5
- By submission: 7
- By decision: 2
- Draws: 1
- No contests: 1

Other information
- Notable students: James Te-Huna
- Boxing record from BoxRec
- Mixed martial arts record from Sherdog

Mark Hunt (born 23 March 1974) is a New Zealand former professional mixed martial artist and kickboxer. As a mixed martial artist, Hunt competed in Pride Fighting Championships (Pride FC) from 2004 until 2006, and the Ultimate Fighting Championship (UFC) from 2010 until 2018. As a kickboxer, Hunt achieved success as the winner of the 2001 K-1 World Grand Prix. He is known as the "King of Walk-Offs" due to his habit of walking away and stopping attacks before the referee officially ends the match.

== Background ==
Hunt was born in South Auckland into a large Samoan family, and was a troubled child eventually leading to two jail terms for violent offending. He had no intention to be a professional fighter until a late night altercation outside a nightclub just after getting out of jail for the second time in Auckland changed the course of his life. The brawl did not last long, and Hunt knocked out multiple people. Sam Marsters, one of the bouncers at the door was impressed by the young man's knockout power and invited him to his gym to take up formal training, and a week later, Hunt won a Muay Thai kickboxing match via knockout. Hunt received a six-pack of beer as a reward for the fight. Later that year Hunt moved to Sydney, Australia (residing in Campbelltown), to train with Alex Tui, and few years later he settled in Liverpool Kickboxing Gym under Maori instructor Hape Ngaranoa.

== Kickboxing career ==
=== K-1 ===
In the beginning of his career, Hunt was used by the promoters as a stepping stone for their up-and-coming fighters, taking up fights at short notice, until Tarik Solak promoted K-1 Oceania tournament in February 2000. With a record of (15–4, 3 KO's) Hunt entered his first K-1 tournament as a heavy underdog.

He won the K-1 Oceania title by knocking out "The Coconut Crusher" Aumitagi in quarter finals, Rony Sefo in semis and Phil Fagan in the finals. After this he was invited to Japan for K-1 qualifications. He lost his first international fight by unanimous decision against Jérôme Le Banner.

In 2001, Hunt returned to K-1 by winning the K-1 Oceania tournament for the second consecutive year. After that he took part of K-1 World GP 2001 in Melbourne, where he beat Japanese boxer Hiromi Amada, before suffering a close unanimous decision loss to reigning champion Ernesto Hoost. However, because of his exciting fighting style Hunt was granted a wildcard spot in the repechage tournament for the K-1 World GP 2001 Finals, when Mirko Cro Cop had to pull out due to injury. He was drawn against Ray Sefo, who won the bout by outpointing Hunt. After the fight, however, Sefo suffered an eye injury and was not able to continue, allowing Hunt to proceed in his place. Hunt then TKO'd Adam Watt to earn his place in the K-1 World Grand Prix Finals at the Tokyo Dome.

During the matchmaking for the K-1 Finals, Hunt surprised the crowd by choosing Jérôme Le Banner, whom he had just lost in the previous year, as his quarterfinal opponent. Hunt won the rematch by knocking out Le Banner in the second round and advanced himself onto the semi-finals facing Stefan Leko. Hunt knocked down Leko two times in the first round and went on to win the fight by unanimous decision. The stage was set for the final battle against Brazilian Kyokushin karate champion Francisco Filho. In the final Hunt defeated Filho by unanimous decision to become the K-1 World Grand Prix 2001 champion.

In 2002, Hunt went to Paris to fight Le Banner again for the third time what turned out to be one of the biggest battles in K-1 history. Le Banner, fighting in front of his hometown audience, knocked down Hunt in the second round but was in turn knocked down himself a few seconds later. In the final moments of the round, Hunt was knocked down for the second time again by the powerful Frenchman. In between rounds the towel was thrown in as Hunt could not continue.

On 17 December 2002, Mark Hunt returned to defend his K-1 World Grand Prix Championship. In quarter finals, entering the third round and behind on all scorecards, Mark was able to connect with a right cross that knocked out Stefan Leko and advanced him to the semi-finals against his career-long nemesis Jerome Le Banner. Despite knocking down the Frenchman at the end of the third round, Hunt lost the fight by decision. It would to be his last K-1 World Grand Prix appearance.

In April 2008, FEG announced Hunt's return to K-1 and nominated him as the challenger of K-1 Super Heavyweight Championship held by Semmy Schilt. The match was held on 13 April 2008, in Yokohama, Japan at the K-1 World GP 2008 in Yokohama. Hunt lost the fight at the end of the first round by spinning back kick to the body.

== Mixed martial arts career ==
=== PRIDE Fighting Championship ===
Hunt's mixed martial arts career saw him fight in events in Japan's PRIDE Fighting Championships. His first MMA fight was a submission loss to Hidehiko Yoshida, an Olympic gold medalist in judo. In his second fight, he defeated American wrestler Dan Bobish by TKO. Hunt stepped in as a late replacement for Sakuraba, and won a split decision against an outweighed PRIDE middleweight (205 lb) champion Wanderlei Silva. Silva, renowned for his brutal punching and Muay Thai clinch game, was neutralised by the hard-hitting Samoan and knocked down several times in the fight. At the PRIDE Shockwave 2005 event, Hunt surprisingly defeated Mirko Cro Cop via a split decision, after his earlier loss to him in K-1. At PRIDE 31: Unbreakable, Hunt defeated Japanese boxer Yosuke Nishijima in the third round with a powerful one-two punch.

Hunt's next fight was in the opening round of PRIDE's 2006 Open-Weight Grand Prix (PRIDE Total Elimination Absolute) on 5 May 2006. His opponent was Japan's Tsuyoshi Kohsaka, who he defeated by TKO in the second round. He then faced American catch-wrestler Josh Barnett at PRIDE Critical Countdown Absolute in the second round of the tournament. Hunt was immediately taken down by Barnett and ultimately lost to a kimura submission roughly two-and-a-half minutes into the first round.

Following that fight, Hunt next lost to PRIDE Heavyweight Champion Fedor Emelianenko at PRIDE Shockwave 2006. Hunt controlled Emelianenko most of the fight and even effectively countered an armbar early in the bout. Hunt's greatest chance of winning came when he was able to put Emelianenko in an Americana. Unfortunately for Hunt, Emelianenko was able to fight through it and submit Hunt with a kimura.

=== Post-PRIDE ===
On 21 July 2008, more than a year after his previous MMA fight, Hunt returned to MMA to face Alistair Overeem at the Dream 5: Lightweight Grand Prix 2008 Final Round, and was submitted by an armlock in just over a minute into the first round.

Hunt was set to fight Jerome Le Banner at Dynamite!! 2008 but ended up fighting late replacement Melvin Manhoef after Le Banner pulled out. Despite the fact that he had a substantial weight advantage over Manhoef, he was knocked out in 18 seconds in the first round. This marked the first time he had been stopped by knockout due to punches to the head.

On 26 May 2009, Hunt fought former DREAM Middleweight Champion Gegard Mousasi in the opening round of the Super Hulk Grand Prix at Dream 9. He lost the fight via submission in the first round.

=== Ultimate Fighting Championship ===
When the UFC acquired Pride FC in 2007, they also acquired Hunt's contract. Hunt was owed a specific number of fights on a no-cut contract, but due to Hunt being on a losing streak at the time, the UFC reportedly offered him a total sum of approximately $450,000 for a contract buyout, but Hunt refused, electing to fight instead. Hunt made his UFC debut on 25 September 2010, at UFC 119 against fellow UFC newcomer and undefeated prospect Sean McCorkle. Hunt trained with American Top Team for the fight. Photos that had emerged on the internet had shown that Hunt had lost a considerable amount of weight in comparison to that of his Pride days. Hunt lost the fight via submission in the first round.

Hunt's next fight in the UFC was against Chris Tuchscherer at UFC 127 on 27 February 2011, in Sydney, Australia. Hunt defeated Tuchscherer in the second round via KO, earning Knockout of the Night honors.

Hunt faced Ben Rothwell at UFC 135 on 24 September 2011. He won the fight via unanimous decision.

Hunt next faced Cheick Kongo on 26 February 2012, at UFC 144. He won the fight via TKO in the first round.

Hunt was expected face Stefan Struve on 26 May 2012, at UFC 146. However, he pulled out of the bout due to injury ten days prior to the event.

The bout with Struve was rescheduled for 3 March 2013, at UFC on Fuel TV 8. Hunt defeated Struve via third-round TKO in a performance that earned him Knockout of the Night honors.

Hunt faced Junior dos Santos on 25 May 2013, at UFC 160, replacing an injured Alistair Overeem. Hunt lost the fight via knockout in the third round in a bout that earned both participants Fight of the Night honors. Afterwards, some major MMA media outlets were considering this to be the best fight in the history of the UFC heavyweight division.

Hunt faced Antônio Silva in the main event on 7 December 2013, at UFC Fight Night 33. The fight went to a decision, with one judge scoring it 48–47 for Hunt, while the other two judges had the scores even 47–47, resulting in a majority draw. Post-fight, Dana White stated that the bout won Fight of the Night and, despite the draw result, both men would receive their win bonuses. The bout with Silva has been described as one of the best in the promotion's heavyweight history. In a post-fight test, Silva tested positive for elevated testosterone, which was believed to be attributed to undergoing UFC-approved testosterone replacement therapy. In turn, the bout is still a "draw" on Hunt's official record, while in Silva's case it was overturned to a no-contest.

==== Contract dispute ====
On 5 August 2014, Hunt posted cryptic tweets about becoming unemployed, which Dana White immediately denied. At first, Hunt blamed his tweets on hunger, but later in mid-August he revealed that he had decided to walk away from the sport due to business reasons. Hunt originally wanted a three-fight contract while the UFC wanted an eight-fight contract. After Hunt's decision to walk away, his wife convinced him to return to fighting and he ended up with a six-fight contract with the organisation. At the end of August 2014, Hunt revealed that the contract would be the last of his mixed martial arts career.

=== Continuation in UFC ===
Hunt faced Roy Nelson on 20 September 2014, at UFC Fight Night 52. He won the fight via knockout in the second round. The win earned Hunt his first Performance of the Night bonus award, and the World MMA Awards' 2014 Knockout of the Year award.

On 21 October 2014, it was announced that Hunt would replace injured UFC Heavyweight Champion Cain Velasquez in the main event of UFC 180. He faced off against Fabrício Werdum for the interim UFC Heavyweight Championship. Despite having early success and dropping Werdum twice, Hunt lost the fight via TKO in the second round.

Hunt faced Stipe Miocic on 10 May 2015, at UFC Fight Night 65. He lost the fight via TKO in the fifth round. Miocic set a UFC record for the most strikes landed in a fight, outlanding Hunt 361–48 over the duration of the bout.

Hunt faced Antônio Silva in a rematch on 15 November 2015, at UFC 193. Hunt won the fight via TKO, after dropping Silva with a straight right up against the fence at 3:41 of the first round.

Hunt faced Frank Mir on 20 March 2016, at UFC Fight Night 85. He won the fight via KO in the first round after sending Mir to the canvas with a right hand. He was awarded with Performance of the Night for his efforts. It was later announced that Mir failed an in-competition drug test.

Despite talks about Hunt's current contract being his last, on 14 April 2016, it was announced that Hunt had signed a new six-fight, multi-million-dollar contract with the UFC.

Hunt faced a returning Brock Lesnar on 9 July 2016, at UFC 200. He lost the fight via unanimous decision. However, on 15 July, it was revealed that Lesnar had tested positive for a banned substance in a pre-fight drug test. The test result was conducted on 28, 11 June days prior to the fight, and was flagged by USADA as a potential anti-doping violation. On 19 July, the UFC announced that Lesnar tested positive for the same banned substance in a second, in-competition sample. On 23 August, the Nevada Athletic Commission confirmed that Lesnar twice tested positive for the oestrogen blocker clomiphene, and that he has been temporarily suspended. Due to Lesnar's positive tests, the result of the fight was changed to a no contest.

Hunt faced Alistair Overeem in a rematch on 4 March 2017, at UFC 209. He lost the fight via knockout in the third round.

Hunt faced Derrick Lewis on 11 June 2017, in the main event at UFC Fight Night 110. It was the first combat sports event in Auckland since UFC Fight Night 43 in Vector Arena. He won the fight via TKO in round four. The win also earned Hunt his third Fight of the Night bonus award.

Hunt was expected to face Marcin Tybura on 19 November 2017, at UFC Fight Night: Hunt vs. Tybura. However, on 10 October, Hunt was pulled from the card and was replaced by Fabrício Werdum after UFC officials reviewed Hunt's article, entitled, "If I Die Fighting, That's Fine" on his health status from the consequences he suffered from his fighting career. Hunt was upset with the news, responding on his Instagram that the quote was taken out of context and that he had been cleared to fight by doctors two days before he was pulled from the bout.

I will probably end my life fighting. … I just hope that if it does happen, it will be in an honest and fair competition. My body is fucked but my mind is still here. I’ve still got my senses about me and I know what's right and wrong, which is the main thing. … I feel proud that I got here without cheating. Proud that I got here without taking any shortcuts and by doing it the proper way. My way. … I’d be champ already if it wasn't for the cheaters. … We need the Ali Act put in place. Fighters want to know what they’re worth. … These guys don't get paid jack shit.

— from "If I die fighting, that's fine" article

On 5 December 2017, it was announced that Hunt had been cleared to fight after undergoing medical tests in Las Vegas that were arranged by the UFC.

Hunt faced Curtis Blaydes on 11 February 2018, at UFC 221. Prior to the event, Hunt announced that he would not seek to renew his contract after it expired. Hunt knocked down Blaydes in the first round, but would be outwrestled for the remainder of the fight and lost via unanimous decision.

Hunt faced Aleksei Oleinik on 15 September 2018, in the main event of UFC Fight Night 136. He lost the fight via rear-naked choke submission in the first round.

Hunt faced Justin Willis on 2 December 2018, at UFC Fight Night 142. He lost the fight via unanimous decision. The fight was his last fight of his UFC contract, with Hunt stating that he would continue his fighting career with other organisations.

== Boxing ==
Hunt faced Paul Gallen in a six-round heavyweight match on 16 December 2020 at Bankwest Stadium in Sydney, Australia. He lost via unanimous decision.

Hunt faced Sonny Bill Williams on 5 November 2022 at Ken Rosewall Arena in Sydney, Australia. He won the fight via technical knockout in the fourth round.

== Professional wrestling career ==
=== Hustle (2007–2008) ===
Hunt had his first professional wrestling appearance on 25 November 2007 for Japanese promotion Hustle. He was introduced as a living weapon sorted in a Dynamite Hardcore Weapons Match between a team of the babyface faction Hustle Army (formed by Kintaman and Kurodaman) and one of the heel stable Takada Monster Army (Monster C and "Fire Monster" Achichi). After Kintaman gained control of him, Hunt knocked out both C and Achichi and allowed the Hustle Army to win the match. Hunt stayed in the ring and danced with the victorious Kintaman and Kurodaman, though accidentally knocking them out as well in the process.

Hunt returned to the promotion on 21 February 2008, coming to the ring to save Monster Bono from a beating by Tiger Jeet Singh and his allies of the Takada Monster Army. Hunt and Bono teamed up at the next event on 24 February, marking Hunt's first and last professional wrestling match. They wrestled Singh and Commander An Jo and won the bout when Bono pinned the latter.

== Fighting style ==
Hunt is known as a brawler and prefers to fight standing up. He has a powerful left hook and right straight. The majority of Hunt's MMA career wins have come via KO or TKO from punches; he has no submission wins. Hunt also holds a notable KO victory over Roy Nelson, who is cited as having one of the most durable chins in combat sports.

Hunt is known for having a strong chin. This was shown in his bout against Mirko Cro Cop in K-1 World Grand Prix 2002 in Nagoya, in which he went the distance with the Croatian in spite of being hit by one of Cro Cop's famous headkicks in the third round. Hunt fought Cro Cop a second time in Pride Shockwave 2005 and won by decision.

== Television and film ==
Hunt is the subject of a feature-length documentary The Art of Fighting (2013), which premiered on Fuel TV (Australia) on 22 May 2013.

Hunt was cast in a small role in the Australian film Crazy Murder, released in 2014.

== Personal life ==
Hunt was born a Mormon, but is now a born-again Christian. He lives in Australia with his second wife and has six children. The first two children from his first marriage are already adults. Hunt and his second wife, Julie, met in a reggae club around 1994 and have four children. In December 2014 Hunt's older brother John committed suicide at the age of 44.

In August 2015, Hunt became a vegan after viewing undercover video footage of the insides of a factory farm. On his Facebook page, where he posted the video, he captioned, "I'm going vegan, hate this". However, on 7 July 2016, Hunt stated that he has not gone completely vegan due to the time demands of the sport, but is a vegetarian.

Auckland's UFC team and Game of Thrones star Jason Momoa performed "Haka – a traditional war cry, dance or challenge from the Māori people from New Zealand" to cheer and support Hunt for his fight against Derrick Lewis.

== Championships and accomplishments ==
=== Kickboxing ===
- K-1
  - 2002 K-1 World Grand Prix Final 3rd place
  - 2001 K-1 World Grand Prix Champion
  - 2001 K-1 World Grand Prix in Fukuoka Repechage B Champion
  - 2001 K-1 World Grand Prix Preliminary Melbourne Champion
  - 2000 K-1 Oceania Grand Prix Champion
- World Kickboxing Federation
  - 1999 WKBF Australian Super Heavyweight Champion

=== Mixed martial arts ===
- Ultimate Fighting Championship
  - Knockout of the Night (two times) vs. Chris Tuchscherer and Stefan Struve
  - Fight of the Night (three times) vs. Junior dos Santos, Antônio Silva, and Derrick Lewis
  - Performance of the Night (two times) vs. Roy Nelson and Frank Mir
  - Tied (Travis Browne & Tom Aspinall) for fourth-most Post-Fight bonuses in UFC Heavyweight division history (7)
  - UFC.com awards
    - 2013: Ranked #3 Fight of the Year vs. Antônio Silva
    - 2014: Ranked #4 Knockout of the Year vs. Roy Nelson
- Sherdog
  - 2014 All-Violence Third Team
- Fight Matrix
  - 2004 Rookie of the Year
  - 2004 Most Noteworthy Upset of the Year vs. Wanderlei Silva on 31 December
  - 2004 Most Lopsided Upset of the Year vs. Wanderlei Silva on 31 December
- World MMA Awards
  - 2014 Knockout of the Year vs. Roy Nelson at UFC Fight Night: Hunt vs. Nelson
- Bloody Elbow
  - 2014 Knockout of the Year vs. Roy Nelson at UFC Fight Night: Hunt vs. Nelson
- MMA Junkie
  - 2014 September Knockout of the Month vs. Roy Nelson

== Mixed martial arts record ==
Professional record breakdown
29 matches	13 wins	14 losses
By knockout	10	5
By submission	0	7
By decision	3	2
Draws	1	
No contests	1	

Res.	Record	Opponent	Method	Event	Date	Round	Time	Location	Notes
Loss	13–14–1 (1)	Justin Willis	Decision (unanimous)	UFC Fight Night: dos Santos vs. Tuivasa	2 December 2018	3	5:00	Adelaide, Australia	
Loss	13–13–1 (1)	Aleksei Oleinik	Submission (rear-naked choke)	UFC Fight Night: Hunt vs. Oleinik	15 September 2018	1	4:26	Moscow, Russia	
Loss	13–12–1 (1)	Curtis Blaydes	Decision (unanimous)	UFC 221	11 February 2018	3	5:00	Perth, Australia	
Win	13–11–1 (1)	Derrick Lewis	TKO (punches)	UFC Fight Night: Lewis vs. Hunt	11 June 2017	4	3:51	Auckland, New Zealand	Fight of the Night
Loss	12–11–1 (1)	Alistair Overeem	KO (knee)	UFC 209	4 March 2017	3	1:44	Las Vegas, Nevada, United States	
NC	12–10–1 (1)	Brock Lesnar	NC (overturned)	UFC 200	9 July 2016	3	5:00	Las Vegas, Nevada, United States	Originally a unanimous decision win for Lesnar. Overturned to a no contest by the NSAC after Lesnar tested positive for clomiphene
Win	12–10–1	Frank Mir	KO (punch)	UFC Fight Night: Hunt vs. Mir	20 March 2016	1	3:01	Brisbane, Australia	Performance of the Night. Mir tested positive for a turinabol metabolite.
Win	11–10–1	Antônio Silva	TKO (punches)	UFC 193	15 November 2015	1	3:41	Melbourne, Australia	
Loss	10–10–1	Stipe Miocic	TKO (punches)	UFC Fight Night: Miocic vs. Hunt	10 May 2015	5	2:47	Adelaide, Australia	
Loss	10–9–1	Fabrício Werdum	TKO (knee and punches)	UFC 180	15 November 2014	2	2:27	Mexico City, Mexico	For the interim UFC Heavyweight Championship
Win	10–8–1	Roy Nelson	KO (punch)	UFC Fight Night: Hunt vs. Nelson	20 September 2014	2	3:00	Saitama, Japan	Performance of the Night. Knockout of the Year (2014)
Draw	9–8–1	Antônio Silva	Draw (majority)	UFC Fight Night: Hunt vs. Bigfoot	7 December 2013	5	5:00	Brisbane, Australia	Fight of the Night. Silva's result was changed to a no contest due to a failed post-fight drug test, while Hunt's remained a majority draw.
Loss	9–8	Junior dos Santos	KO (spinning hook kick)	UFC 160	25 May 2013	3	4:18	Las Vegas, Nevada, United States	Fight of the Night
Win	9–7	Stefan Struve	TKO (punches)	UFC on Fuel TV: Silva vs. Stann	3 March 2013	3	1:44	Saitama, Japan	Knockout of the Night
Win	8–7	Cheick Kongo	TKO (punches)	UFC 144	26 February 2012	1	2:11	Saitama, Japan	
Win	7–7	Ben Rothwell	Decision (unanimous)	UFC 135	24 September 2011	3	5:00	Denver, Colorado, United States	
Win	6–7	Chris Tuchscherer	KO (punch)	UFC 127	27 February 2011	2	1:41	Sydney, Australia	Knockout of the Night
Loss	5–7	Sean McCorkle	Submission (straight armbar)	UFC 119	25 September 2010	1	1:03	Indianapolis, Indiana, United States	
Loss	5–6	Gegard Mousasi	Submission (straight armbar)	Dream 9	26 May 2009	1	1:20	Yokohama, Japan	DREAM Super Hulk Grand Prix Quarterfinal
Loss	5–5	Melvin Manhoef	KO (punches)	Dynamite!! 2008	31 December 2008	1	0:18	Saitama, Japan	
Loss	5–4	Alistair Overeem	Submission (keylock)	Dream 5: Lightweight Grand Prix 2008 Final Round	21 July 2008	1	1:11	Osaka, Japan	
Loss	5–3	Fedor Emelianenko	Submission (kimura)	Pride Shockwave 2006	31 December 2006	1	8:16	Saitama, Japan	For the PRIDE Heavyweight Championship
Loss	5–2	Josh Barnett	Submission (kimura)	Pride Critical Countdown Absolute	1 July 2006	1	2:02	Saitama, Japan	PRIDE Openweight Grand Prix Quarterfinal
Win	5–1	Tsuyoshi Kohsaka	TKO (punches)	Pride Total Elimination Absolute	5 May 2006	2	4:15	Osaka, Japan	PRIDE Openweight Grand Prix Opening Round
Win	4–1	Yosuke Nishijima	KO (punch)	Pride 31	26 February 2006	3	1:18	Saitama, Japan	
Win	3–1	Mirko Cro Cop	Decision (split)	PRIDE Shockwave 2005	31 December 2005	3	5:00	Saitama, Japan	
Win	2–1	Wanderlei Silva	Decision (split)	PRIDE Shockwave 2004	31 December 2004	3	5:00	Saitama, Japan	
Win	1–1	Dan Bobish	TKO (kick to the body)	PRIDE 28	31 October 2004	1	6:23	Saitama, Japan	
Loss	0–1	Hidehiko Yoshida	Submission (armbar)	PRIDE Critical Countdown 2004	20 June 2004	1	5:25	Saitama, Japan	

== Pay-per-view bouts ==
No	Event	Fight	Date	Venue	City	PPV buys
1.	UFC 180	Werdum vs. Hunt	November 15, 2014	Arena Ciudad de México	Mexico City, Mexico	190,000

== Kickboxing record (incomplete) ==
30 wins (13 (T)KOs, 17 decisions), 13 losses
Date	Result	Opponent	Event	Location	Method	Round	Time	Record
2008-04-13	Loss	(Netherlands) Semmy Schilt	K-1 World GP 2008 in Yokohama	Yokohama, Japan	TKO (spinning back kick)	1	3:00	30–13
Fight was for Schilt's K-1 Super Heavyweight title
2003-05-02	Win	(Trinidad and Tobago) Gary Goodridge	K-1 World Grand Prix 2003 in Las Vegas	Las Vegas, Nevada, US	Decision (unanimous)	3	3:00	30–12
2002-12-17	Loss	(France) Jérôme Le Banner	K-1 World Grand Prix 2002 semi-finals	Tokyo, Japan	Decision (unanimous)	3	3:00	29–12
2002-12-17	Win	(Germany) Stefan Leko	K-1 World Grand Prix 2002 quarter-finals	Tokyo, Japan	KO (punch)	3	1:16	29–11
2002-10-05	Win	(South Africa) Mike Bernardo	K-1 World Grand Prix 2002 Final Elimination	Saitama, Japan	Ext.R decision (unanimous)	4	3:00	28–11
Qualifies for K-1 World Grand Prix 2002
2002-05-22	Loss	(France) Jérôme Le Banner	K-1 World Grand Prix 2002 in Paris	Paris, France	TKO (corner stoppage)	2	3:00	27–11
2002-03-03	Loss	(Croatia) Mirko Cro Cop	K-1 World Grand Prix 2002 in Nagoya	Nagoya, Japan	Decision (unanimous)	5	3:00	27–10
2002-01-27	Win	(Japan) Tsuyoshi Nakasako	K-1 Rising 2002	Japan	TKO (referee stoppage)	2	2:55	27–9
2001-12-08	Win	(Brazil) Francisco Filho	K-1 World Grand Prix 2001 Final	Tokyo, Japan	Ext.R decision (unanimous)	4	3:00	26–9
Wins K-1 World Grand Prix 2001 championship
2001-12-08	Win	(Germany) Stefan Leko	K-1 World Grand Prix 2001 semi-finals	Tokyo, Japan	Decision (unanimous)	3	3:00	25–9
2001-12-08	Win	(France) Jérôme Le Banner	K-1 World Grand Prix 2001 quarter-finals	Tokyo, Japan	KO (right hook)	2	2:32	24–9
2001-10-08	Win	(Australia) Adam Watt	K-1 World Grand Prix 2001 in Fukuoka Final	Fukuoka, Japan	TKO (doctor stoppage)	3	1:38	23–9
Wins K-1 World GP 2001 in Fukuoka championship and qualifies for K-1 World Grand Prix 2001
2001-10-08	Loss	(New Zealand) Ray Sefo	K-1 World Grand Prix 2001 in Fukuoka semi-finals	Fukuoka, Japan	Decision (unanimous)	3	3:00	22–9
Despite defeat advances to the final due to an injury suffered by Ray Sefo
2001-07-21	Loss	(Australia) Peter Graham	K-1 New Zealand Grand Prix 2001	Auckland, New Zealand	Decision (unanimous)	5	3:00	22–8
2001-06-16	Loss	(Netherlands) Ernesto Hoost	K-1 World Grand Prix 2001 in Melbourne semi-finals	Melbourne	Decision (unanimous)	3	3:00	22–7
Despite defeat will be invited to K-1 World Grand Prix 2001 in Fukuoka
2001-06-16	Win	(Japan) Hiromi Amada	K-1 World Grand Prix 2001 in Melbourne quarter-finals	Melbourne	KO (right hook)	1	2:52	22–6
2001-02-24	Win	(Australia) Peter Graham	K-1 World Grand Prix 2001 Preliminary Melbourne Final	Melbourne	KO (right uppercut)	3	2:10	21–6
Wins K-1 Oceania GP 2001 in Melbourne championship and qualifies for K-1 World Grand Prix 2001 in Melbourne
2001-02-24	Win	(New Zealand) Andrew Peck	K-1 World Grand Prix 2001 Preliminary Melbourne semi-finals	Melbourne	KO (punch)	1	0:48	20–6
2001-02-24	Win	(Australia) Nathan Briggs	K-1 World Grand Prix 2001 Preliminary Melbourne quarter-finals	Melbourne	KO (punches)	1	0:57	19–6
2000-07-30	Loss	(France) Jérôme Le Banner	K-1 World Grand Prix 2000 in Nagoya quarter-finals	Nagoya, Japan	Decision (unanimous)	3	3:00	18–6
2000-05-14	Win	(Australia) Fadi Haddara	K-1 Revenge Oceania	Melbourne	Decision (unanimous)	5	3:00	18–5
2000-02-27	Win	(Australia) Phil Fagan	K-1 Grand Prix 2000 Oceania Final	Melbourne	KO	2	0:30	17–5
Wins K-1 Oceania Grand Prix 2000 championship and qualifies for K-1 World Grand Prix in Nagoya
2000-02-27	Win	(New Zealand) Rony Sefo	K-1 Grand Prix 2000 Oceania semi-finals	Melbourne	Decision (unanimous)	3	3:00	16–5
2000-02-27	Win	(Samoa) Clay Aumitagi	K-1 Grand Prix 2000 Oceania quarter-finals	Melbourne	KO	2	1:56	15–5
1999-10-23	Loss	(Tonga) Neilson Taione	Superfighter 2	Sydney	Decision (unanimous)	5	3:00	14–5
Wins WKBF Australian Super Heavyweight title
1999	Win	(Australia) Chris Chrispoulides	N/A	Sydney	Decision (unanimous)	5	3:00	14–4
Legend Win Loss Draw/no contest Notes

== Professional boxing record ==
1 win (1 knockout, 0 decisions), 2 losses (0 knockouts, 2 decisions), 1 draw
Res.	Record	Opponent	Type	Rd., Time	Date	Location	Notes
Win	1–2–1	(New Zealand) Sonny Bill Williams	TKO	4 (8)	2022-11-05	(New South Wales) Ken Rosewall Arena, Sydney, Australia	
Loss	0–2–1	(Australia) Paul Gallen	PTS	6	2020-12-16	(New South Wales) Bankwest Stadium, Parramatta, Australia	
Draw	0–1–1	(Australia) Joe Askew	PTS	4	2000-04-23	Wyong RSL Club, Wyong, New South Wales, Australia	
Loss	0–1	(Australia) John Wyborn	PTS	3	1998-08-21	(New South Wales) Bondi Diggers Club, Sydney, Australia	

== See also ==
- List of current UFC fighters
- List of K-1 champions
- List of K-1 events
- List of male kickboxers
- List of male mixed martial artists
- List of multi-sport athletes
- List of Pride FC events
