= Christian Morecraft =

American mixed martial artist (born 1986)

- Born: September 8, 1986 (age 40); Washington, D.C., United States
- Height: 6 ft 6 in (198 cm)
- Weight: 260 lb (118 kg; 18 st 8 lb)
- Division: Heavyweight
- Reach: 81 in (210 cm)
- Fighting out of: Plymouth, Massachusetts, United States
- Team: Team Bombsquad; Cape Cod Fighting Alliance
- Years active: 2008–present

Mixed martial arts record
- Total: 11
- Wins: 8
- By knockout: 3
- By submission: 5
- Losses: 3
- By knockout: 3

Other information
- Mixed martial arts record from Sherdog

Christian Morecraft (born September 8, 1986) is an American mixed martial artist, who fought in the UFC in the heavyweight division.

== Background ==
Morecraft is from Washington, D.C., and went to an MMA school before turning pro in 2008. He also worked in construction before becoming a professional fighter.

== Mixed martial arts career ==
=== Ultimate Fighting Championship ===
Morecraft made his UFC debut on August 7, 2010, at UFC 117 taking on 6'11 Stefan Struve. In round one, Morecraft took Struve down and dominated him with vicious ground and pound, but was unable to gain a stoppage. In round two, Struve came out quickly and landed hard punches on Morecraft, TKO'ing him in just 22 seconds.

Morecraft fought Sean McCorkle on March 26, 2011, at UFC Fight Night 24 for his second UFC appearance. After a closely contested first round, Morecraft dominated in the second. However, Morecraft then threw an illegal low blow, causing the referee to stop the action to allow McCorkle time to recover. Morecraft went on to win the fight after choking McCorkle unconscious from a standing guillotine choke.

Morecraft faced Matt Mitrione on June 26, 2011, at UFC on Versus 4 for his third UFC match. Mitrione outworked Morecraft throughout the entire fight before knocking him out late in the second round.

Morecraft faced Pat Barry on January 20, 2012, at UFC on FX: Guillard vs. Miller. Despite taking down Barry and locking up an armbar early in round one, he was unable to submit his opponent and lost the fight via KO. With Morecraft's performance, he was awarded Fight of the Night honors along with Barry.

Morecraft announced on March 26, 2013, that he is leaving the fight business. After some time off, Morecraft returned to fighting on September 14 at CFX 23, where he won the bout via armbar.

== Personal life ==
=== Arrest ===
On the evening of September 1, 2012, Morecraft was pulled over by officers from the Barnstable (Mass.) Police Department. He subsequently was arrested on suspicion of operating a motor vehicle while under the influence of alcohol, driving so as to endanger and speeding and driving with no license in possession.

== Championships and accomplishments ==
=== Mixed martial arts ===
- Ultimate Fighting Championship
  - Fight of the Night (One time) vs. Pat Barry
- Reality Fighting
  - Reality Fighting Heavyweight Title (One time)
- Cage Fighting Xtreme
  - Cage Fighting Xtreme Heavyweight Title (One time)

== Mixed martial arts record ==
Professional record breakdown
11 matches	8 wins	3 losses
By knockout	3	3
By submission	5	0

Res.	Record	Opponent	Method	Event	Date	Round	Time	Location	Notes
Win	8–3	Randy Smith	Submission (armbar)	CFX 23: Summer Slam	September 14, 2013	1	1:28	Plymouth, Massachusetts, United States	
Loss	7–3	Pat Barry	KO (punches)	UFC on FX: Guillard vs. Miller	January 20, 2012	1	3:38	Nashville, Tennessee, United States	Fight of the Night.
Loss	7–2	Matt Mitrione	KO (punches)	UFC Live: Kongo vs. Barry	June 26, 2011	2	4:28	Pittsburgh, Pennsylvania, United States	
Win	7–1	Sean McCorkle	Technical Submission (standing guillotine choke)	UFC Fight Night: Nogueira vs. Davis	March 26, 2011	2	4:10	Seattle, Washington, United States	
Loss	6–1	Stefan Struve	KO (punches)	UFC 117	August 7, 2010	2	0:22	Oakland, California, United States	
Win	6–0	Lee Beane	TKO (submission to punches)	CFX 9: Finally	May 28, 2010	1	2:40	Plymouth, Massachusetts, United States	
Win	5–0	Jason Dolloff	TKO (punches)	CFX 8: Rumble in the Jungle 3	February 20, 2010	1	0:40	Plymouth, Massachusetts, United States	
Win	4–0	Josh Diekmann	Submission (rear-naked choke)	CFX 6: Rumble in the Jungle 2	November 14, 2009	1	0:56	Plymouth, Massachusetts, United States	
Win	3–0	Eric Foley	Submission (armbar)	Reality Fighting-Showdown	July 18, 2009	1	1:10	Plymouth, Massachusetts, United States	
Win	2–0	Eric Foley	KO (punches)	Reality Fighting-Final Conflict	November 1, 2008	1	2:25	Plymouth, Massachusetts, United States	
Win	1–0	John Curtis	TKO (punches)	Reality Fighting-Nightmare	April 12, 2008	1	0:41	Plymouth, Massachusetts, United States	

== See also ==
- List of current UFC fighters
- List of male mixed martial artists
