= UFC Fight Night: Nogueira vs. Davis =

UFC mixed martial arts event in 2011

- The poster for UFC Fight Night: Nogueira vs. Davis
- Promotion: Ultimate Fighting Championship
- Date: March 26, 2011
- Venue: KeyArena
- City: Seattle, Washington
- Attendance: 13,741
- Total gate: $1,182,850

Event chronology
UFC 128: Shogun vs. Jones	UFC Fight Night: Nogueira vs. Davis	UFC 129: St. Pierre vs. Shields

UFC Fight Night: Nogueira vs. Davis (also known as UFC Fight Night 24) was a mixed martial arts event held by the Ultimate Fighting Championship on March 26, 2011, at the KeyArena in Seattle, Washington.

== Background ==
The event did not lead into the season premiere of The Ultimate Fighter 13 as has been the case for most of that program's seasonal debuts. That took place on March 30.

On February 19, 2011, Dana White alerted followers on Twitter that Tito Ortiz had to pull out of his fight with Antônio Rogério Nogueira, after receiving a severe cut on his forehead, and would be replaced by Phil Davis.

On March 5, Duane Ludwig was forced out of his fight with Amir Sadollah due to injury. James Wilks was tapped as his replacement. Wilks then injured himself, and was forced to withdraw from the bout. DaMarques Johnson was the replacement. Also on March 5, Dennis Hallman suffered a knee injury in training and was forced out of his bout against TJ Waldburger. Johny Hendricks stepped in as Hallman's replacement.

On March 16, Nick Pace was forced out of his bout against Michael McDonald due to suffering an injury. Promotional newcomer Edwin Figueroa stepped in as his replacement.

Also on March 16, a broken foot forced Nam Phan out of his rematch with Leonard Garcia and was replaced by Chan Sung Jung creating a rematch from their Fight of the Night performance at WEC 48: Aldo vs. Faber, which ended in a controversial decision win for Garcia (29–28, 28–29, 29–28).

The UFC announced via their official Twitter account that five preliminary bouts would stream on Facebook. This would also be the last UFC event until UFC on Fox: Evans vs. Davis the following year to feature at least one unaired preliminary fight.

== Results ==
Main card (Spike TV)
Weight class				Method	Round	Time	Notes
Light Heavyweight	Phil Davis	def.	Antônio Rogério Nogueira	Decision (unanimous) (30–27, 30–27, 30–27)	3	5:00
Welterweight	Anthony Johnson	def.	Dan Hardy	Decision (unanimous) (30–27, 30–27, 30–27)	3	5:00
Welterweight	Amir Sadollah	def.	DaMarques Johnson	TKO (submission to strikes)	2	3:27
Featherweight	Chan Sung Jung	def.	Leonard Garcia	Submission (twister)	2	4:59
Preliminary card (Facebook)
Weight class				Method	Round	Time	Notes
Heavyweight	Mike Russow	def.	Jon Madsen	TKO (doctor stoppage)	2	5:00
Featherweight	Mackens Semerzier	def.	Alex Caceres	Submission (rear-naked choke)	1	3:18
Welterweight	John Hathaway	def.	Kris McCray	Decision (split) (28–29, 29–28, 29–28)	3	5:00
Bantamweight	Michael McDonald	def.	Edwin Figueroa	Decision (unanimous) (30–27, 30–27, 30–27)	3	5:00
Heavyweight	Christian Morecraft	def.	Sean McCorkle	Technical Submission (guillotine choke)	2	4:10
Preliminary card
Welterweight	Johny Hendricks	def.	TJ Waldburger	TKO (punches)	1	1:35
Middleweight	Aaron Simpson	def.	Mario Miranda	Decision (unanimous) (30–27, 30–27, 30–26)	3	5:00
Lightweight	Nik Lentz	def.	Waylon Lowe	Submission (guillotine choke)	3	2:24

== Bonus awards ==
The following fighters received $55,000 bonuses.

- Fight of the Night: Michael McDonald vs. Edwin Figueroa
- Knockout of the Night: Johny Hendricks
- Submission of the Night: Chan Sung Jung

== Reported Payout ==
The following is the reported payout to the fighters as reported to the Washington State Department of Licensing. It does not include sponsor money or "locker room" bonuses often given by the UFC and also do not include the UFC's traditional "fight night" bonuses.

- Phil Davis: $34,000 (includes $17,000 win bonus) def. Antônio Rogério Nogueira: $90,000
- Anthony Johnson: $40,000 ($20,000 win bonus) def. Dan Hardy: $25,000
- Amir Sadollah: $40,000 ($20,000 win bonus) def. DaMarques Johnson: $14,000
- Chan Sung Jung: $10,000 ($5,000 win bonus) def. Leonard Garcia: $18,000
- Mike Russow: $28,000 ($14,000 win bonus) def. Jon Madsen: $10,000
- Mackens Semerzier: $12,000 ($6,000 win bonus) def. Alex Caceres: $8,000
- John Hathaway: $26,000 ($13,000 win bonus) def. Kris McCray: $10,000
- Michael McDonald: $10,000 ($5,000 win bonus) def. Edwin Figueroa: $6,000
- Christian Morecraft: $12,000 ($6,000 win bonus) def. Sean McCorkle: $10,000
- Johny Hendricks: $44,000 ($22,000 win bonus) def. TJ Waldburger: $8,000
- Aaron Simpson: $30,000 ($15,000 win bonus) def. Mario Miranda: $10,000
- Nik Lentz: $30,000 ($15,000 win bonus) def. Waylon Lowe: $12,000
