= Pudzian Band =

Polish disco polo and dance group

Pudzian Band is a Polish disco polo and dance group founded in 2005 by the strongman Mariusz Pudzianowski and his younger brother Krystian. They had various tours in 2006 and 2007 and in one concert were seen by 190,000 people. The music video of their song "Zdobyć Świat" (Conquer the World) appeared in December 2006.

== Band members ==
- Mariusz Pudzianowski
- Anna Brzozowska
- Krystian Pudzianowski
- Ross Tweedy

== Álbum ==
First record in Disco Polo style.

2013 - Tak To Czuję:

Track	Track name
01	Cała Sala
02	Czuję Kiedy Jesteś
03	Dawaj Na Maxa
04	Dawaj Na Ring (2013)
05	Idę Solo
06	Dzień Za Dniem
07	Kiedy Ty
08	Po Prostu
09	Podnieście W Górę Ręce
10	Tylko Dla Ciebie
11	Wszystko Między Nami
12	Żyję Jak Chcę
13	Idę Solo (RMX)

== Singles ==
Year	Single
2006	Zdobyć Świat [Rock Polish Style]
2007	Baila Me... Yeh Yeh
2007	Po Prostu Sobą Bądź [Rock Polish Style]
2007	Takich Już Nie Ma (Feat. A2) [Rock Polish Style]
2011	Idę Solo
2012	Podnieście W Górę Ręce
2013	Cała Sala
2013	Czuję Kiedy Jesteś
2014	Mój Aniele
2014	Płonie Ogień W Nas
2015	Bądź Wierna Mi
2015	Jesteś Wszystkim Co Dziś Mam
2015	Weekend Polaka
2016	Całuj Mnie Do Rana
2016	Dziś Bawimy Się
2016	Tylko Tobie Dam
2017	Ta Dziewczyna To Szaleństwo
2017	Do Góry Ręce
2017	Masz To Jak W Banku
2018	Usta Jak Maliny
2018	Bierz, Bierz, Bierz
2018	Wnerwiona (Feat. Noizz Bros)
2019	Weź To Ogarnij
2019	Ty Mi Robisz Dobrze
2020	Zakochałem Się

== Official links ==
- Official Web Site
- Official Fanpage Facebook
