= Stefan Struve =

Dutch mixed martial artist

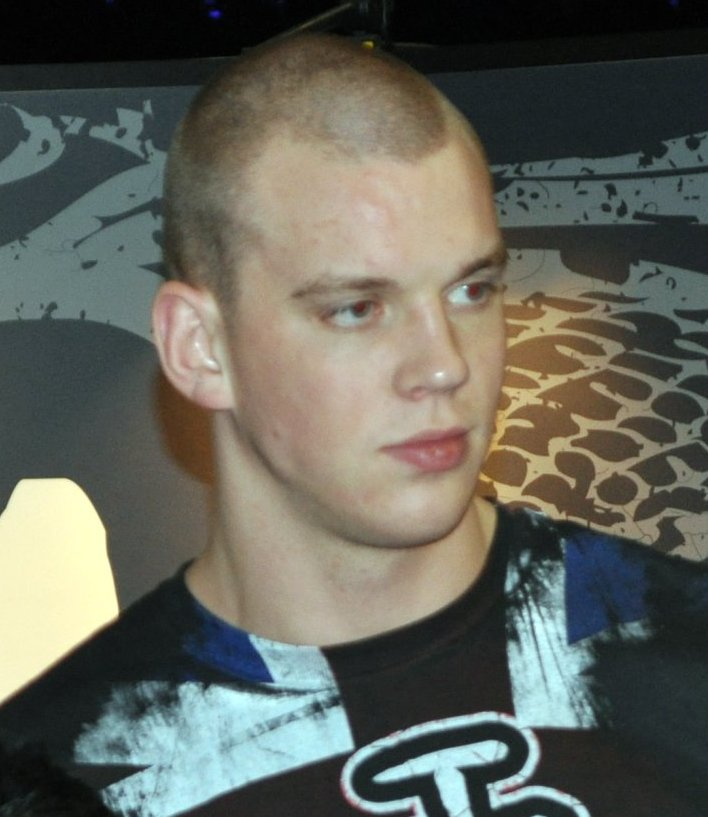
- Born: Stefan Struve; February 18, 1988 (age 38); Beverwijk, Netherlands
- Other names: Skyscraper
- Height: 7 ft 0 in (213 cm)
- Weight: 265 lb (120 kg; 18 st 13 lb)
- Division: Heavyweight (2006–2021); Light Heavyweight (2005–2006)
- Reach: 84 1/2 in (215 cm)
- Fighting out of: Beverwijk, Netherlands
- Team: Team Schreiber; Blackzilians (2015–2016); Sanford MMA (formerly)
- Rank: Brown belt in Brazilian Jiu-Jitsu
- Years active: 2005–2020

Kickboxing record
- Total: 4
- Wins: 4
- By knockout: 3

Mixed martial arts record
- Total: 42
- Wins: 29
- By knockout: 8
- By submission: 18
- By decision: 2
- By disqualification: 1
- Losses: 13
- By knockout: 9
- By submission: 1
- By decision: 3

Other information
- Mixed martial arts record from Sherdog

Stefan Struve (born February 18, 1988) is a Dutch former mixed martial artist who competed as a heavyweight in the Ultimate Fighting Championship (UFC). Standing at 7 ft 0 in (2.13 m) tall, he is the tallest fighter in the history of the UFC.

== Background ==
Growing up in the Netherlands, Struve played football until the age of 14. When Struve's brother took him to the local martial arts gym (owned by Bob Schreiber), he decided to pursue a career in mixed martial arts (MMA) instead. Struve had his first and only amateur MMA bout at age 16 and won via head kick knockout.

== Mixed martial arts career ==
Struve made his professional debut for the GFN organization when he was 17, fighting John De Wilde at Gentlemen Fight Night. By late 2008, he had racked up a record of 16–2, losing once (in his second fight) via injury to Romualds Garkulis and again in the second round of a Star Of Peresvit tournament in Ukraine, to future Bellator Light heavyweight Champion Christian M'Pumbu.

In 2008, Struve negotiated with the DREAM and Affliction promotions, before signing a four-fight deal with the UFC.

=== Ultimate Fighting Championship ===
Struve lost his UFC debut bout at UFC 95 to Junior dos Santos in the first round, after dos Santos stormed Struve with an aggressive flurry of punches.

Struve won his next fight on June 13, 2009, at UFC 99, over Denis Stojnić. Struve was cut open by hammer fists from Stojnic while on his back in the first round and, despite bleeding profusely, persevered in the second round and gained Stojnic's back, eventually locking in a rear naked choke to win by submission at 2:37 of the second round.

Struve defeated previously undefeated UFC newcomer Chase Gormley on October 24, 2009, at UFC 104 (also winning the "Submission of the Night" award). The bout was composed mainly of grappling after Gormley took Struve down. There, Struve attempted submissions, before giving up top position to Gormley and securing a triangle choke.

Struve then signed a new four-fight deal with the UFC. His first fight of this contract was against returning veteran Paul Buentello, at UFC 107. Struve replaced injured Todd Duffee. Struve defeated Buentello by majority decision (29–28, 29–28, and 28–28). After the fight, Struve stated "I don't feel like a winner right now", apparently displeased with his performance.

Struve fought The Ultimate Fighter: Heavyweights winner Roy Nelson on March 31, 2010, at UFC Fight Night 21. Nelson ducked under several of Struve's punches and scored a solid right hook on his chin for the knockout.

Struve then faced undefeated UFC newcomer Christian Morecraft at UFC 117. Struve defeated Morecraft via TKO due to punches at 0:22 of round 2. Morecraft dominated Struve in round one with a ground and pound attack but was counterpunched and knocked out by Struve during an aggressive rush in round two. The performance won Struve the "Knockout of the Night" bonus award. Between rounds, Struve told his corner, "I'm almost fainting right now, guys."

In September 2010, Struve signed a new four-fight contract with the UFC.

Struve defeated the previously undefeated Sean McCorkle via first-round TKO on December 11, 2010, at UFC 124. After being taken down early and escaping a kimura attempt, Struve swept McCorkle, gaining mount, and rained down a steady stream of strikes for the victory.

Struve faced the then-undefeated Travis Browne on May 28, 2011, at UFC 130. Despite starting off strong, nearly locking in a D'arce choke, Struve would mistakenly jump for a flying knee, which Browne countered with a superman punch to KO Struve.

Struve defeated Pat Barry on October 1, 2011, at UFC on Versus 6. After a long feeling-out process in the 1st round, Struve clinched with Barry, dragged him to the ground, and swiftly locked in a triangle armbar, earning the "Submission of the Night" bonus award in the process.

Struve faced Dave Herman on February 15, 2012, at UFC on Fuel TV 1, winning via second-round TKO. During a tepid first round, Struve seemed slow to start, finding little success against Herman who closed the distance and looked the more agile striker of the two. In the second round, Struve began to open up, mixing in a body-clinch take-down while piecing together striking combinations. He landed a left hook, inside leg kick, left hook & right uppercut in quick succession to drop a stunned Herman, proceeding to mount his opponent and deliver strikes until forcing the referee's intervention.

Struve was expected to face Mark Hunt on May 26, 2012, at UFC 146 but, on May 17, 2012, Hunt withdrew from the bout due to an injury and was replaced by Lavar Johnson. Struve quickly submitted Johnson in the first round with an armbar, earning his third "Submission of the Night" bonus.

Struve faced undefeated prospect, Stipe Miocic at UFC on Fuel TV 5 on September 29, 2012. The opening stanza saw Miocic slightly edge Struve in a competitive stand-up battle, until the second round when Struve utilized his reach more effectively and became more aggressive. He won the fight via TKO in the second round. The performance earned both participants "Fight of the Night" honors.

Struve faced Mark Hunt on March 3, 2013, at UFC on Fuel TV 8. Hunt defeated Struve via third-round TKO, and broke Struve's jaw with one of his final punches of the fight.

On August 20, 2013, Struve was reported to have suffered from a leaking aortic valve as well as an enlarged heart, doctors found that Stefan has a bicuspid aortic valve, which means that his aortic valve only has two leaflets, instead of three. It was decided to treat his condition with medication for the next two months. On October 8, 2013, reports came that Struve's heart condition was improving and that a return to fighting was still a possibility. November 24, 2013, it was reported that he was ready to return to a full training schedule.

On April 7, 2014, manager Lex McMahon announced in the show "The MMA Hour" that Struve has approval from the doctor to fight again and return to the Octagon. Quote: “I think we’re very close. Very exciting news with Stefan, he was actually cleared by his doctor in the Netherlands. Right now we’re just waiting for a copy of his file to be translated so that the UFC can have their doctor take a look at it, and they’re going to determine whether or not to have Stefan get a second opinion or not. If they do bring him out for a second opinion, that would likely be out in Los Angeles with the UFC’s cardiologist that they use frequently. I believe they sent Dan Hardy to him and a few other folks.”

Struve was expected to face Matt Mitrione on July 5, 2014, at UFC 175. During the first fight of the main card, however, Struve fainted in the dressing room and had an elevated heart rate. UFC personnel decided to cancel the fight. Struve was later taken to the hospital for precautionary reasons.

Struve faced Alistair Overeem at UFC on Fox 13 on December 13, 2014. He lost the fight via KO in the first round.

Struve faced Antônio Rodrigo Nogueira at UFC 190 on August 1, 2015. He won the fight by unanimous decision, marking only his second fight in his career to end in decision.

Struve faced Jared Rosholt on November 14, 2015, at UFC 193. He lost the fight by unanimous decision.

Struve faced Antônio Silva on May 8, 2016, at UFC Fight Night 87. He won the bout via knockout in the first round after catching his opponent with a right hook on the chin followed with a knee to the body and multiple elbows to the side of his opponent's head. This win also earned Struve his first Performance of the Night bonus.

Struve was expected to face Ruslan Magomedov on October 8, 2016, at UFC 204. However, Magomedov pulled out in early September citing a staph infection. He was replaced by Daniel Omielańczuk. Struve won the back and forth fight via submission in the second round.

Struve was originally expected to face Junior dos Santos in a rematch on February 19, 2017, at UFC Fight Night 105. However, on January 12, Struve pulled out due to a shoulder injury.

Struve faced Alexander Volkov on 2 September 2017 at UFC Fight Night: Volkov vs. Struve. He lost the fight via TKO in the third round. Despite the loss, Struve earned his second Fight of the Night bonus award for the bout.

Struve faced Andrei Arlovski at UFC 222. He lost the fight by unanimous decision.

Struve faced Marcin Tybura on July 22, 2018, at UFC Fight Night 134. He lost the fight via unanimous decision.

As the ultimate fight of his prevailing contract, Struve faced Marcos Rogério de Lima on February 23, 2019, at UFC on ESPN+ 3 in the last fight of his contract with the UFC. He won the fight by arm-triangle choke in the second round despite having been knocked down by the first punch of the fight. After the fight, Struve indicated this could be his final fight. This win earned him the Performance of the Night award.

After a brief hiatus to contemplate his fighting future, Struve signed a new six-fight contract with the UFC and faced Ben Rothwell on December 7, 2019, at UFC on ESPN 7. He lost the fight via technical knockout in round two. The finish was controversial as Rothwell had accidentally hit Struve in the groin twice and was docked one point for these infractions in the second round. The referee encouraged the compromised Struve to continue, resulting in a finish for Rothwell late in the second round.

Struve faced Tai Tuivasa on October 24, 2020 at UFC 254. He lost the fight via knockout in the first round.

On February 15, 2021, Struve announced his retirement from professional mixed martial arts competition.

== Personal life ==
In October 2013, Struve's father Jaap died of cancer. Struve has an enlarged heart and a bicuspid aortic valve.

Stefan and his wife have a son, Tobi (born 2020).

== Championships and accomplishments ==
=== Mixed martial arts ===
- Ultimate Fighting Championship
  - Fight of the Night (Two times) vs. Stipe Miocic and Alexander Volkov
  - Performance of the Night (Two times) vs. Antônio Silva and Marcos Rogério de Lima
  - Knockout of the Night (One time) vs. Christian Morecraft
  - Submission of the Night (Three times) vs. Chase Gormley, Pat Barry and Lavar Johnson
  - Tied (Derrick Lewis) for second most Post-Fight bonuses in UFC Heavyweight division history (8)
  - Tied (Andrei Arlovski, Gabriel Gonzaga & Francis Ngannou) for third most finishes in UFC Heavyweight division history (11)
  - UFC.com Awards
    - 2009: Ranked #4 Newcomer of the Year
    - 2012: Ranked #6 Fighter of the Year
- Cage Gladiators
  - Cage Gladiators Heavyweight Champion (One time)
- MMA Fighting
  - 2012 #5 Ranked Fighter of the Year
- Bleacher Report
  - 2012 #9 Ranked Fighter of the Year

== Mixed martial arts record ==
Professional record breakdown
42 matches	29 wins	13 losses
By knockout	8	9
By submission	18	1
By decision	2	3
By disqualification	1	0

Res.	Record	Opponent	Method	Event	Date	Round	Time	Location	Notes
Loss	29–13	Tai Tuivasa	KO (punches)	UFC 254	October 24, 2020	1	4:59	Abu Dhabi, United Arab Emirates	
Loss	29–12	Ben Rothwell	TKO (punches)	UFC on ESPN: Overeem vs. Rozenstruik	December 7, 2019	2	4:57	Washington, D.C., United States	Rothwell was deducted a point in round 2 due to repeated groin strikes.
Win	29–11	Marcos Rogério de Lima	Submission (arm-triangle choke)	UFC Fight Night: Błachowicz vs. Santos	February 23, 2019	2	2:21	Prague, Czech Republic	Performance of the Night.
Loss	28–11	Marcin Tybura	Decision (unanimous)	UFC Fight Night: Shogun vs. Smith	July 22, 2018	3	5:00	Hamburg, Germany	
Loss	28–10	Andrei Arlovski	Decision (unanimous)	UFC 222	March 3, 2018	3	5:00	Las Vegas, Nevada, United States	
Loss	28–9	Alexander Volkov	TKO (punches)	UFC Fight Night: Volkov vs. Struve	September 2, 2017	3	3:30	Rotterdam, Netherlands	Fight of the Night.
Win	28–8	Daniel Omielańczuk	Submission (D'Arce choke)	UFC 204	October 8, 2016	2	1:41	Manchester, England	
Win	27–8	Antônio Silva	KO (elbows)	UFC Fight Night: Overeem vs. Arlovski	May 8, 2016	1	0:16	Rotterdam, Netherlands	Performance of the Night.
Loss	26–8	Jared Rosholt	Decision (unanimous)	UFC 193	November 15, 2015	3	5:00	Melbourne, Australia	
Win	26–7	Antônio Rodrigo Nogueira	Decision (unanimous)	UFC 190	August 1, 2015	3	5:00	Rio de Janeiro, Brazil	
Loss	25–7	Alistair Overeem	KO (punches)	UFC on Fox: dos Santos vs. Miocic	December 13, 2014	1	4:13	Phoenix, Arizona, United States	
Loss	25–6	Mark Hunt	TKO (punches)	UFC on Fuel TV: Silva vs. Stann	March 3, 2013	3	1:44	Saitama, Japan	
Win	25–5	Stipe Miocic	TKO (punches)	UFC on Fuel TV: Struve vs. Miocic	September 29, 2012	2	3:50	Nottingham, England	Fight of the Night.
Win	24–5	Lavar Johnson	Submission (armbar)	UFC 146	May 26, 2012	1	1:05	Las Vegas, Nevada, United States	Submission of the Night.
Win	23–5	Dave Herman	TKO (punches)	UFC on Fuel TV: Sanchez vs. Ellenberger	February 15, 2012	2	3:52	Omaha, Nebraska, United States	
Win	22–5	Pat Barry	Submission (triangle armbar)	UFC Live: Cruz vs. Johnson	October 1, 2011	2	3:22	Washington, D.C., United States	Submission of the Night.
Loss	21–5	Travis Browne	KO (punch)	UFC 130	May 28, 2011	1	4:11	Las Vegas, Nevada, United States	
Win	21–4	Sean McCorkle	TKO (punches)	UFC 124	December 11, 2010	1	3:55	Montreal, Quebec, Canada	
Win	20–4	Christian Morecraft	TKO (punches)	UFC 117	August 7, 2010	2	0:22	Oakland, California, United States	Knockout of the Night.
Loss	19–4	Roy Nelson	KO (punches)	UFC Fight Night: Florian vs. Gomi	March 31, 2010	1	0:39	Charlotte, North Carolina, United States	
Win	19–3	Paul Buentello	Decision (majority)	UFC 107	December 12, 2009	3	5:00	Memphis, Tennessee, United States	
Win	18–3	Chase Gormley	Submission (triangle choke)	UFC 104	October 24, 2009	1	4:04	Los Angeles, California, United States	Submission of the Night.
Win	17–3	Denis Stojnić	Submission (rear-naked choke)	UFC 99	June 13, 2009	2	2:37	Cologne, Germany	
Loss	16–3	Junior dos Santos	TKO (punches)	UFC 95	February 21, 2009	1	0:54	London, England	
Win	16–2	Mario Neto	Submission (rear-naked choke)	Cage Gladiators 10: Clash of the Titans	November 29, 2008	2	3:19	Liverpool, England	
Win	15–2	Ralf Wonnink	Submission (armbar)	K.O. Events: Tough Is Not Enough	October 5, 2008	1	0:15	Rotterdam, Netherlands	
Win	14–2	Yuji Sakuragi	Submission (triangle choke)	M-1 Challenge 6: Korea	August 29, 2008	1	2:30	Seoul, South Korea	
Win	13–2	Colin Robinson	Submission (triangle choke)	Cage Gladiators 8	July 27, 2008	1	N/A	Liverpool, England	
Win	12–2	Ralf Wonnink	Submission (rear-naked choke)	Beast of the East	January 26, 2008	1	N/A	Zutphen, Netherlands	
Loss	11–2	Christian M'Pumbu	Submission (D'Arce choke)	Star of Peresvit	December 7, 2007	1	2:05	Kyiv, Ukraine	Star of Peresvit Openweight Tournament Semifinals.
Win	11–1	Sergey Danish	TKO (corner stoppage)	Star of Peresvit	December 7, 2007	2	2:20	Kyiv, Ukraine	Star of Peresvit Openweight Tournament Quarterfinals.
Win	10–1	Tomek Smykowski	Submission (choke)	Tempel Fight School: Mixfight Gala VI	November 25, 2007	1	N/A	Munich, Germany	
Win	9–1	Tom Blackledge	Submission (triangle choke)	Cage Gladiators 5	November 4, 2007	1	2:14	Liverpool, England	
Win	8–1	Denis Komkin	Submission (rear-naked choke)	Bratsk Combat Sports Festival: Siberian Challenge 1	October 14, 2007	1	N/A	Bratsk, Russia	
Win	7–1	Marko Šintic	Submission (triangle choke)	Combined Forces: The Real Deal	May 5, 2007	1	N/A	Emmen, Netherlands	
Win	6–1	Atte Backman	Submission (triangle choke)	Fight Festival 21	March 17, 2007	1	3:54	Helsinki, Finland	
Win	5–1	Florian Müller	TKO (punches)	Outsider Cup 6	December 16, 2006	2	1:38	Duisburg, Germany	
Win	4–1	Marcus Sursa	Submission (triangle choke)	World Extreme Fighting: Orleans Arena	June 10, 2006	1	3:01	Las Vegas, Nevada, United States	Heavyweight debut.
Win	3–1	Murat Bourekba	DQ (fish-hooking)	Staredown City	February 5, 2006	N/A	N/A	Oostzaan, Netherlands	
Win	2–1	Emir Smajlovic	KO (punches)	MMA: Event	September 17, 2005	1	N/A	Netherlands	
Loss	1–1	Romualds Garkulis	TKO (corner stoppage)	Mixfight Gala	April 16, 2005	1	5:00	Netherlands	
Win	1–0	John de Wilde	Submission (armbar)	Gentlemen Fight Night	March 19, 2005	1	N/A	Netherlands	

== See also ==
- List of male mixed martial artists
