= Kamil Kraska =

Polish mixed martial artist (born 1998)

- Born: Kamil Kraska; April 1, 1998 (age 28); Ostrów Wielkopolski, Poland
- Height: 5 ft 10 in (1.78 m)
- Weight: 170 lb (77 kg; 12 st 2 lb)
- Division: Welterweight (2018–present)
- Reach: 72.8 in (185 cm)
- Fighting out of: Ostrów Wielkopolski, Poland
- Team: Rio Grappling Ostrów Wielkopolski
- Years active: 2018–present

Mixed martial arts record
- Total: 18
- Wins: 15
- By knockout: 6
- By submission: 7
- By decision: 2
- Losses: 3
- By knockout: 1
- By submission: 1
- By decision: 1

Other information
- Mixed martial arts record from Sherdog

Kamil Kraska (born April 1, 1998) is a Polish professional mixed martial artist. He currently competes in the Welterweight division of Fight Nation Championship (FNC). He is the current FNC Welterweight champion. He has previously competed on Fight Exclusive Night.

== Mixed martial arts career ==
=== Early career ===
Kraska made his professional debut on April 7, 2018 against Mateusz Grzeżółkowski. Kraska won the fight via a first-round TKO.

His next fight came on November 2, 2018 against Łukasz Siwiec. Kraska lost the fight via a second-round submission.

=== Fight Exclusive Night ===
Kraska made his debut under Fight Exclusive Night on January 12, 2019 against Szymon Szarpak. Kraska won the fight via a first-round submission.

=== Return to regionals ===
His next fight came on May 25, 2019 against Łukasz Dziudzia. Kraska won the fight via a third-round TKO.

His next fight came on December 13, 2019 against Paweł Karwowski. Kraska won the fight via a second-round submission.

=== First return to Fight Exclusive Night ===
Kraska returned to Fight Exclusive Night on August 22, 2020 against Piotr Golon. Kraska won the fight via a first-round submission.

=== Babilon MMA ===
Kraska made his debut under Babilon MMA on February 12, 2021 against Mateusz Głuch. Kraska won the fight via a first-round TKO.

=== Second return to Fight Exclusive Night ===
Kraska returned to Fight Exclusive Night on June 26, 2021 against Jose Barrios Vargas. Kraska won the fight via a Unanimous Decision.

His next fight came on January 22, 2021 against Tato Primera. Kraska won the fight via a first-round submission. This win earned him his first career Submission of the Night bonus.

He faced Cezary Oleksiejczuk for the FEN Welterweight Championship on June 18, 2022. Kraska lost the fight via a Unanimous Decision. Despite the loss, he earned a Fight of the Night bonus.

His next fight came on January 28, 2023 against Leandro Barbosa. Kraska won the fight via a third-round submission. This win earned him his second Submission of the Night bonus.

His next fight came on August 25, 2023 against Adrian Zieliński. Kraska lost the fight via a second-round TKO. Despite the loss, he earned his second Fight of the Night bonus.

His final fight to date under the federation came on February 17, 2024 against Aslambek Arsamikov. Kraska won the fight via a Unanimous Decision.

=== Return to Babilon MMA ===
He returned to Babilon MMA on August 9, 2024 against Matias Juarez. Kraska won the fight via a first-round submission.

=== Fight Nation Championship ===
He made his debut under Croatian federation Fight Nation Championship on November 23, 2024 against Jovan Marjanović. Kraska won the fight via a first-round TKO.

==== FNC Welterweight Champion ====
Kraska faced Stefan Negucić for the vacant FNC Welterweight Championship on May 24, 2025. Kraska won the fight via a first-round TKO, winning his first career championship in the process.

His first title defense came on November 29, 2025 against Igor Cavalcanti. Kraska won the fight via a second-round submission.

His second title defense came on May 30, 2026, against Ivica Trušček. Kraska won the fight via a second-round TKO, successfully defending his championship.

== Championships and accomplishments ==
=== Mixed martial arts ===
- Fight Nation Championship
  - FNC Welterweight Championship (One time; current)
    - Two successful title defenses
- Fight Exclusive Night
  - Fight of the Night (Two times)
  - Submission of the Night (Two times)

== Mixed martial arts record ==
Professional record breakdown
18 matches	15 wins	3 losses
By knockout	6	1
By submission	7	1
By decision	2	1

Res.	Record	Opponent	Method	Event	Date	Round	Time	Location	Notes
Win	15–3	Ivica Trušček	TKO (punches)	FNC 31	May 30, 2026	2	3:15	Belgrade, Serbia	Defended the FNC Welterweight Championship.
Win	14–3	Igor Cavalcanti	Submission (arm-triangle choke)	FNC 25	November 29, 2025	2	4:00	Varaždin, Croatia	Defended the FNC Welterweight Championship.
Win	13–3	Stefan Negucić	TKO (punches)	FNC 23	May 24, 2025	1	0:54	Belgrade, Serbia	Won the vacant FNC Welterweight Championship.
Win	12–3	Jovan Marjanović	TKO (punches)	FNC 20	November 23, 2024	1	2:59	Zagreb, Croatia	
Win	11–3	Matias Juarez	Submission (guillotine choke)	Babilon MMA 46	August 9, 2024	1	2:07	Międzyzdroje, Poland	
Win	10–3	Aslambek Arsamikov	Decision (unanimous)	Fight Exclusive Night 52	February 17, 2024	3	5:00	Ostrów Wielkopolski, Poland	
Loss	9–3	Adrian Zieliński	TKO (punches)	Fight Exclusive Night 49	August 25, 2023	2	3:09	Mrągowo, Poland	Fight of the Night.
Win	9–2	Leandro Barbosa	Submission (rear-naked choke)	Fight Exclusive Night 44	January 28, 2023	3	2:09	Ostrów Wielkopolski, Poland	Submission of the Night.
Loss	8–2	Cezary Oleksiejczuk	Decision (unanimous)	Fight Exclusive Night 40	June 18, 2022	5	5:00	Ostróda, Poland	Fight of the Night.
Win	8–1	Tato Primera	Submission (anaconda choke)	Fight Exclusive Night 38	January 22, 2022	1	1:48	Ostrów Wielkopolski, Poland	Catchweight (174 lb) bout; Submission of the Night.
Win	7–1	Jose Barrios Vargas	Decision (unanimous)	Fight Exclusive Night 35	June 26, 2021	3	5:00	Ostróda, Poland	
Win	6–1	Mateusz Głuch	TKO (leg kick and punches)	Babilon MMA 19	February 12, 2021	1	2:58	Warsaw, Poland	
Win	5–1	Piotr Golon	Submission (rear-naked choke)	Fight Exclusive Night 29	August 22, 2020	1	4:20	Ostróda, Poland	
Win	4–1	Paweł Karwowski	Submission (guillotine choke)	Celtic Gladiator 26	December 13, 2019	2	3:20	Olsztyn, Poland	
Win	3–1	Łukasz Dziudzia	TKO (body kick and punches)	Poznań Fight Show Night	May 25, 2019	3	N/A	Poznań, Poland	
Win	2–1	Szymon Szarpak	Submission (rear-naked choke)	Fight Exclusive Night 23	January 12, 2019	1	1:58	Lubin, Poland	
Loss	1–1	Łukasz Siwiec	Submission (rear-naked choke)	Madness Cage Fighting 4	November 2, 2018	2	4:52	Puławy, Poland	
Win	1–0	Mateusz Grzeżółkowski	TKO (punches)	Octagon No Mercy Runda 4	April 7, 2018	1	N/A	Ostrów Wielkopolski, Poland	Welterweight debut.

== See also ==
- List of male mixed martial artists
