= Wawrzyniec Bartnik =

Polish mixed martial artist (born 1995)

- Born: Wawrzyniec Bartnik; 10 December 1995 (age 30); Częstochowa, Poland
- Other names: The Mantis
- Height: 6 ft 0 in (1.83 m)
- Weight: 170 lb (77 kg; 12 st 2 lb)
- Division: Middleweight (2017–2020); Welterweight (2023–present); Super Welterweight (2021)
- Reach: 74.4 in (189 cm)
- Fighting out of: Częstochowa, Poland
- Team: Forma Fight Team; Ankos MMA
- Years active: 2017–present

Mixed martial arts record
- Total: 17
- Wins: 12
- By knockout: 7
- By submission: 0
- By decision: 5
- By disqualification: 0
- Losses: 5
- By knockout: 1
- By submission: 0
- By decision: 4

Other information
- Mixed martial arts record from Sherdog

Wawrzyniec Bartnik (born 10 December 1995) is a Polish professional mixed martial artist. He is the current FEN Welterweight Champion. He has previously competed on Brave Combat Federation.

== Professional career ==
=== Early career ===
Bartnik made his professional debut on September 23, 2017, against Krystian Bielski. Bartnik lost the fight via a Unanimous Decision.

His next fight came on May 26, 2018, against Ashley Gibson. Bartnik won the fight via a first-round knockout.

His next fight came on September 29, 2018, against Dawid Kosiorek. Bartnik won the fight via a third-round TKO.

=== Zagłębiowski Horror Show and Rocky Warriors Cartel ===
Bartnik made his debut under Zagłębiowski Horror Show on January 27, 2019, against Adrian Grzelak. Bartnik won the fight via a Unanimous Decision.

Bartnik made his debut under Rocky Warriors Cartel on April 13, 2019, against Robert Adamczyk. Bartnik won the fight via a Unanimous Decision.

He returned to Zagłębiowski Horror Show on November 23, 2019, against Adrian Dudek. Bartnik won the fight via a Split Decision.

He returned to Rocky Warriors Cartel on February 22, 2020, against Samir Kadi. Bartnik won the fight via a Unanimous Decision.

=== Brave Combat Federation ===
Bartnik made his debut under Brave Combat Federation on September 25, 2021, against future Ultimate Fighting Championship (UFC) fighter, Axel Sola. Bartnik lost the fight via a Unanimous Decision.

=== Fight Exclusive Night ===
Bartnik made his debut under Fight Exclusive Night on June 18, 2022, against Szymon Dusza. Bartnik lost the fight via a second-round TKO.

His next fight came on January 28, 2023, against Jacek Jędraszczyk. Bartnik lost the fight via a Unanimous Decision. Despite the loss, Bartnik earned his first career Fight of the Night bonus.

His next fight came on May 27, 2023, against Bartłomiej Dragański. Bartnik won the fight via a Unanimous Decision. This performance earned him his second consecutive Fight of the Night bonus.

His next fight came on August 18, 2023, against Mohamed Zarey. Bartnik won the fight via a second-round knockout. This performance earned him his first career Knockout of the Night bonus, and third consecutive bonus.

His next fight came on June 15, 2024, against Vladimir Bykov. Bartnik won the fight via a first-round knockout. This performance earned him his second Knockout of the Night bonus, and fourth consecutive bonus.

=== FEN Welterweight Champion ===
Bartnik faced Mansur Mansur Abdurzakov for the FEN Welterweight Championship on November 23, 2024. Bartnik won the fight via a second-round knockout, winning his first career championship in the process. This performance earned him his third Knockout of the Night bonus, and fifth consecutive bonus.

His first title defense came on March 1, 2025, against Jacek Jędraszczyk in a rematch. Bartnik won the fight via a first-round TKO, successfully defending his championship.

Following a near year-long hiatus, Bartnik returned to the cage for his second title defense on March 28, 2026, against Rafał Błachuta. Bartnik won the fight via a first-round knockout, successfully defending his championship for a second time.

== Exhibition boxing career ==
Bartnik made his boxing debut in an exhibition bout against former UFC and KSW fighter, Norman Parke on June 13, 2026. Bartnik won the fight via a Unanimous Decision.

== Personal life ==
Bartnik is an avid supporter of his hometown football club Raków Częstochowa.

== Championships and accomplishments ==
=== Mixed martial arts ===
- Fight Exclusive Night
  - FEN Welterweight Championship (One time; current)
    - Two successful title defenses
  - Knockout of the Night (Three times)
  - Fight of the Night (One time)

== Mixed martial arts record ==
Professional record breakdown
17 matches	12 wins	5 losses
By knockout	7	1
By submission	0	0
By decision	5	4

Res.	Record	Opponent	Method	Event	Date	Round	Time	Location	Notes
Loss	12–5	Mateusz Kisielewski	Decision (unanimous)	King's Arena 4	October 3, 2026	3	5:00	Łódź, Poland	
Win	12–4	Rafał Błachuta	KO (punch)	Fight Exclusive Night 62	March 28, 2026	1	1:52	Częstochowa, Poland	Defended the FEN Welterweight Championship.
Win	11–4	Jacek Jędraszczyk	TKO (punches)	Fight Exclusive Night 58	March 1, 2025	1	1:54	Częstochowa, Poland	Defended the FEN Welterweight Championship.
Win	10–4	Mansur Abdurzakov	KO (punch)	Fight Exclusive Night 57	November 23, 2024	2	1:28	Piotrków Trybunalski, Poland	Won the FEN Welterweight Championship; Knockout of the Night.
Win	9–4	Vladimir Bykov	KO (knee and punch)	Fight Exclusive Night 55	June 15, 2024	1	2:59	Ostróda, Poland	Knockout of the Night.
Win	8–4	Mohamed Zarey	KO (punches)	Fight Exclusive Night 48	August 18, 2023	2	0:16	Jastrzębie-Zdrój, Poland	Knockout of the Night.
Win	7–4	Bartłomiej Dragański	Decision (unanimous)	Fight Exclusive Night 46	May 27, 2023	3	5:00	Piła, Poland	Fight of the Night.
Loss	6–4	Jacek Jędraszczyk	Decision (unanimous)	Fight Exclusive Night 44	January 28, 2023	3	5:00	Ostrów Wielkopolski, Poland	Welterweight debut; Fight of the Night.
Loss	6–3	Szymon Dusza	TKO (knee and punches)	Fight Exclusive Night 40	June 18, 2022	2	1:20	Ostróda, Poland	Catchweight (176 lb) bout.
Loss	6–2	Axel Sola	Decision (unanimous)	Brave CF 54	September 25, 2021	3	5:00	Konin, Poland	Super Welterweight debut.
Win	6–1	Samir Kadi	Decision (unanimous)	Rocky Warriors Cartel 4	February 22, 2020	3	5:00	Dąbrowa Górnicza, Poland	
Win	5–1	Adrian Dudek	Decision (split)	Zagłębiowski Horror Show 3	November 23, 2019	3	5:00	Sosnowiec, Poland	
Win	4–1	Robert Adamczyk	Decision (unanimous)	Rocky Warriors Cartel 2	April 13, 2019	3	5:00	Golina, Poland	
Win	3–1	Adrian Grzelak	Decision (unanimous)	Zagłębiowski Horror Show 2	January 27, 2019	3	5:00	Sosnowiec, Poland	
Win	2–1	Dawid Kosiorek	TKO (punches)	Ludus Arena 1	September 29, 2018	3	2:47	Żuromin, Poland	
Win	1–1	Ashley Gibson	KO (punch)	Risk Fight League 1	May 26, 2018	1	N/A	Leeds, England	
Loss	0–1	Krystian Bielski	Decision (unanimous)	Young Blood Night Vol. 10: MMAtriX	September 23, 2017	3	5:00	Kędzierzyn-Koźle, Poland	Middleweight debut.

== Exhibition boxing record ==
1 fight	1 win	0 losses
By decision	1	0

No.	Result	Record	Opponent	Type	Round, time	Date	Location	Notes
1	Win	1–0	Norman Parke	UD	3	13 Jun 2026	Hala Sportowa, Częstochowa, Poland	

== See also ==
- List of male mixed martial artists
