= Kacper Formela =

Polish mixed martial artist (born 1996)

- Born: Kacper Formela; 31 March 1996 (age 30); Wejherowo, Poland
- Other names: Polish Machida
- Height: 5 ft 9 in (1.75 m)
- Weight: 156 lb (71 kg; 11 st 2 lb)
- Division: Featherweight (2015–2017, 2019–2024); Lightweight (2017–2019, 2023, 2025–present)
- Reach: 71.3 in (181 cm)
- Style: Karate
- Fighting out of: Gdynia, Poland
- Team: Mighty Bulls Gdynia; Piranha Gdynia; Formela Fight Team Władysławowo
- Years active: 2015–present

Mixed martial arts record
- Total: 26
- Wins: 20
- By knockout: 8
- By submission: 3
- By decision: 9
- Losses: 6
- By knockout: 3
- By submission: 1
- By decision: 2

Other information
- Mixed martial arts record from Sherdog

Kacper Formela (born 31 March 1996) is a Polish professional mixed martial artist. He currently competes in the Lightweight division of Konfrontacja Sztuk Walki (KSW). He is a former FEN Featherweight Champion. He has previously competed on Cage Warriors, Babilon MMA, and Absolute Championship Berkut (ACB).

== Professional career ==
=== Early career ===
Formela made his professional debut on December 5, 2015, against Mariusz Michalczuk. Formela won the fight via a first-round submission.

His next fight came on March 12, 2016, against Jurij Jermolo. Formela won the fight via a first-round submission.

His next fight came on April 30, 2016, against Patryk Duński. Formela won the fight via a third-round TKO.

His next fight came on December 10, 2016, against Jakub Wieczorek. Formela won the fight via a Unanimous Decision.

=== Cage Warriors ===
Formela made his debut under Cage Warriors on May 6, 2017, against Aiden Lee. Formela lost the fight via a first-round submission, suffering his first career defeat.

=== Absolute Championship Berkut ===
Formela made his debut under Russian federation Absolute Championship Berkut (ACB) on July 1, 2017, against Armen Stepanyan. Formela won the fight via a Unanimous Decision.

=== Return to regionals ===
His next fight came on October 14, 2017, against Vagif Askerov. Formela won the fight via a second-round submission.

His next fight came on November 18, 2017, against Lucas Tenório. Formela won the fight via a second-round knockout.

His next fight came on June 8, 2018, against Adam Brzezowski, debuting under Babilon MMA. Formela won the fight via a first-round knockout.

=== Return to Cage Warriors ===
Formela returned to Cage Warriors on September 29, 2018, against Mason Jones. Formela lost the fight via a first-round TKO.

=== Rocky Warriors Cartel ===
Formela made his debut under Rocky Warriors Cartel on December 21, 2018, against Sebastian Rajewski. Formela won the fight via a Unanimous Decision.

His final fight with the federation came on July 5, 2019, against Vugar Karamov. Formela lost the fight via a Unanimous Decision.

=== Fight Exclusive Night ===
Formela made his debut under Fight Exclusive Night (FEN MMA) on June 13, 2020, against Łukasz Charzewski. Formela lost the fight via a Split Decision. Despite the loss, this performance earned him his first career Fight of the Night bonus.

His next fight came on August 22, 2020, against Kamil Łebkowski. Formela won the fight via a third-round knockout. This performance earned him his second Fight of the Night bonus in a row.

His next fight came on November 28, 2020, against Edgar Davalos. Formela won the fight via a Unanimous Decision.

His next fight came on March 27, 2021, against Damian Frankiewicz. Formela won the fight via a Unanimous Decision.

==== FEN Featherweight Champion ====
Formela faced Nicolae Hantea for the vacant FEN Featherweight Championship on March 12, 2022. Formela won the fight via a first-round TKO, winning his first career championship in the process.

His first title defense came on June 18, 2022, against Oleksandr Horshechnik. Formela won the fight via a first-round knockout, successfully defending his title. This performance earned him his first career Knockout of the Night bonus.

His second title defense came on December 16, 2022, against Pedro Nobre. Formela won the fight via a first-round TKO, successfully defending his title.

His third and final title defense came on June 17, 2023, against Nurzhan Akishev. Formela won the fight via a Unanimous Decision, successfully defending his title.

His final fight with the federation came on October 14, 2023, in a non-title bout against Nursultan Kassymkhanov. Formela won the fight via a Unanimous Decision.

=== Konfrontacja Sztuk Walki ===
On April 3, 2024, it was announced that Formela had signed for Konfrontacja Sztuk Walki (KSW).

His first fight came on May 11, 2024, against Ahmed Vila. Formela won the fight via a Unanimous Decision.

His next fight came on November 16, 2024, against Robert Ruchała for his interim KSW Featherweight Championship. Formela lost the fight via a third-round TKO.

His next fight came on June 14, 2025, against Roman Szymański. Formela lost the fight via a first-round knockout.

=== Strife MMA ===
Formela made his debut under Strife MMA on November 29, 2025, against Patrick Gomes. Formela won the fight via a first-round TKO.

=== Return to Konfrontacja Sztuk Walki ===
Formela made his return to Konfrontacja Sztuk Walki (KSW) on March 16, 2024, against promotional newcomer Krzysztof Mendlewski. Formela won the fight via a Unanimous Decision.

== Bare-knuckle boxing career ==
Formela made his professional bare-knuckle boxing debut on May 23, 2026, against Maciej Sulecki. Formela won the fight via unanimous decision.

== Championships and accomplishments ==
=== Mixed martial arts ===
==== Fight Exclusive Night ====
- FEN Featherweight Championship (One time; former)
  - Three successful title defenses
- Fight of the Night (Two times)
- Knockout of the Night (One time)

== Mixed martial arts record ==
Professional record breakdown
27 matches	21 wins	6 losses
By knockout	8	3
By submission	3	1
By decision	10	2

Res.	Record	Opponent	Method	Event	Date	Round	Time	Location	Notes
Win	21–6	Leo Brichta	Decision (majority)	KSW 121	September 19, 2026	3	5:00	Liberec, Czech Republic	
Win	20–6	Krzysztof Mendlewski	Decision (unanimous)	KSW 116	March 16, 2026	3	5:00	Gorzów Wielkopolski, Poland	
Win	19–6	Patrick Gomes	TKO (punches)	Strife 16	November 29, 2025	1	0:59	Tczew, Poland	
Loss	18–6	Roman Szymański	KO (punches)	KSW 107	June 14, 2025	1	4:15	Gdańsk, Poland	Return to Lightweight.
Loss	18–5	Robert Ruchała	TKO (elbows and punches)	KSW 100	November 16, 2024	3	2:44	Gliwice, Poland	For the interim KSW Featherweight Championship.
Win	18–4	Ahmed Vila	Decision (unanimous)	KSW 94	May 11, 2024	3	5:00	Gdańsk, Poland	Return to Featherweight.
Win	17–4	Nursultan Kassymkhanov	Decision (unanimous)	Fight Exclusive Night 51	October 14, 2023	3	5:00	Lubin, Poland	Return to Lightweight.
Win	16–4	Nurzhan Akishev	Decision (unanimous)	Fight Exclusive Night 47	June 17, 2023	5	5:00	Ostróda, Poland	Defended the FEN Featherweight Championship.
Win	15–4	Pedro Nobre	TKO (punches)	Fight Exclusive Night 43	December 16, 2022	1	4:32	Szczecin, Poland	Defended the FEN Featherweight Championship.
Win	14–4	Oleksandr Horshechnik	KO (head kick)	Fight Exclusive Night 40	June 18, 2022	1	4:45	Ostróda, Poland	Defended the FEN Featherweight Championship. Knockout of the Night.
Win	13–4	Nicolae Hantea	TKO (punches)	Fight Exclusive Night 39	March 12, 2022	1	1:04	Ząbki, Poland	Won the vacant FEN Featherweight Championship.
Win	12–4	Damian Frankiewicz	Decision (unanimous)	Fight Exclusive Night 33	March 27, 2021	3	5:00	Łódź, Poland	
Win	11–4	Edgar Davalos	Decision (unanimous)	Fight Exclusive Night 31	November 28, 2020	3	5:00	Łódź, Poland	Catchweight (152 lb) bout.
Win	10–4	Kamil Łebkowski	KO (punches)	Fight Exclusive Night 29	August 22, 2020	3	0:14	Ostróda, Poland	Fight of the Night.
Loss	9–4	Łukasz Charzewski	Decision (split)	Fight Exclusive Night 28	June 13, 2020	3	5:00	Lublin, Poland	Catchweight (157 lb) bout. Fight of the Night.
Loss	9–3	Vugar Karamov	Decision (unanimous)	Rocky Warriors Cartel 3	July 5, 2019	3	5:00	Gdynia, Poland	Return to Featherweight.
Win	9–2	Sebastian Rajewski	Decision (unanimous)	Rocky Warriors Cartel 1	December 21, 2018	3	5:00	Kościerzyna, Poland	
Loss	8–2	Mason Jones	TKO (knees)	Cage Warriors 97	September 29, 2018	1	4:03	Cardiff, Wales	
Win	8–1	Adam Brzezowski	KO (head kick and punches)	Babilon MMA 4	June 8, 2018	1	0:40	Ełk, Poland	
Win	7–1	Lucas Tenório	KO (body kick and punches)	Thunderstrike Fight League 12	November 18, 2017	2	1:20	Radom, Poland	Catchweight (148 lb) bout.
Win	6–1	Vagif Askerov	Submission (rear-naked choke)	Gala Sportów Walki 8	October 14, 2017	2	1:21	Międzychód, Poland	Lightweight debut.
Win	5–1	Armen Stepanyan	Decision (unanimous)	ACB 63	July 1, 2017	3	5:00	Gdańsk, Poland	
Loss	4–1	Aiden Lee	Submission (rear-naked choke)	Cage Warriors 83	May 6, 2017	1	3:39	Newport, Wales	
Win	4–0	Jakub Wieczorek	Decision (unanimous)	Slugfest 9	December 10, 2016	3	5:00	Września, Poland	
Win	3–0	Patryk Duński	TKO (knees and punches)	Slava Republic 1	April 30, 2016	3	4:58	Bojano, Poland	
Win	2–0	Jurij Jermolo	Submission (rear-naked choke)	Time of Masters 2	March 12, 2016	1	3:01	Sopot, Poland	
Win	1–0	Mariusz Michalczuk	Submission (rear-naked choke)	PLMMA 61	December 5, 2015	1	4:30	Bytom, Poland	Featherweight debut.

== Bare-knuckle boxing record ==
Professional record breakdown
1 match	1 win	0 losses
By knockout	0	0
By decision	1	0

Res.	Record	Opponent	Method	Event	Date	Round	Time	Location	Notes
Win	1–0	Maciej Sulęcki	Decision (majority)	Fight Mode 1	May 23, 2026	5	3:00	Poznań, Poland	

== See also ==
- List of male mixed martial artists
- List of current Konfrontacja Sztuk Walki fighters
