= Rafał Haratyk =

Polish mixed martial artist (born 1987)

- Born: August 11, 1987 (age 39); Bielsko-Biała, Poland
- Other names: Polish Tank
- Nationality: Polish
- Height: 6 ft 0 in (1.83 m)
- Weight: 205 lb (93 kg; 14 st 9 lb)
- Division: Welterweight (2019); Middleweight (2010–2023); Light Heavyweight (2023–present)
- Reach: 76 in (193 cm)
- Style: Mixed martial arts
- Stance: Orthodox
- Fighting out of: Bielsko-Biała, Poland
- Team: DAAS Berserker's Team Bielsko-Biała
- Years active: 2010–present

Mixed martial arts record
- Total: 29
- Wins: 21
- By knockout: 7
- By submission: 5
- By decision: 9
- Losses: 6
- By knockout: 3
- By submission: 2
- By decision: 1
- Draws: 2

Other information
- Mixed martial arts record from Sherdog

Rafał Haratyk (born August 11, 1987) is a Polish professional mixed martial artist. He is the former KSW Light Heavyweight champion. He has previously competed on Extreme Fighting Championship (EFC), Absolute Championship Akhmat (ACA), and Fight Exclusive Night (FEN MMA).

== Professional career ==
=== Early career ===
Haratyk made his professional debut on May 30, 2010 against Mateusz Pogudz. Haratyk won the fight via a first round submission.

=== Extreme Fighting Championship and Fight Exclusive Night ===
After accumulating a record of 4–1–2, Haratyk joined South African promotion Extreme Fighting Championship. His first fight with the promotion took place on April 4, 2015 against Keron Davies. Haratyk won the fight via a first round submission.

His next fight with the promotion came on August 27, 2015 against Warren Allison. Haratyk won the fight via a first round submission.

On March 19, 2016, Haratyk made his debut with Fight Exclusive Night against Marcin Naruszczka. Haratyk lost this fight via a second round TKO.

Haratyk returned to Extreme Fighting Championship on June 17, 2016 against Gordon Roodman. Haratyk won the fight via a first round TKO.

His next fight came on December 9, 2016 against future UFC Middleweight champion, Dricus du Plessis. Haratyk lost the fight via a second round submission.

=== Babilon MMA ===
Haratyk made his debut with Babilon MMA on December 2, 2017 against Łukasz Bieńkowski. Haratyk won the fight via Split Decision.

His next fight came on March 16, 2018 against Johan Romming. Haratyk won the fight via Unanimous Decision.

His next fight came on August 18, 2018 in a rematch against Marcin Naruszczka. This time, Haratyk won via Unanimous Decision.

His final fight with the promotion came on December 15, 2018 against Maciej Różański. Haratyk won the fight via Unanimous Decision.

=== Absolute Championship Akhmat ===
Haratyk made his debut with Russian promotion Absolute Championship Akhmat on November 29, 2019 against Arbi Aguev. Haratyk won the fight via a first round TKO.

His next fight came on August 20, 2020 against Piotr Strus. Haratyk won the fight via a first round TKO.

His next fight came on November 26, 2020 against Nikola Dipchikov. Haratyk lost the fight via a first round TKO.

His next fight was a rematch against Piotr Strus on April 23, 2021. Haratyk once again beat Strus, this time via Unanimous Decision.

His next fight came on September 11, 2021 against future UFC fighter, Azamat Bekoev. Haratyk won the fight via a third round submission.

His final fight with the promotion came on February 26, 2022 against Vitaliy Nemchinov. Haratyk won the fight via Technical Decision.

=== Ares Fighting Championship ===
Haratyk made his debut with French promotion Ares FC on January 20, 2023 against Abdoul Abdouraguimov for the vacant Ares FC Middleweight championship. Haratyk lost the fight via a fifth round submission.

=== Konfrontacja Sztuk Walki ===
Haratyk made his debut with Konfrontacja Sztuk Walki on October 14, 2023 against Ivan Erslan. Haratyk won the fight via a first round KO.

==== KSW Light Heavyweight champion ====
His next two fights took place on February 24, 2024 as part of the KSW Light Heavyweight Tournament for the vacant KSW Light Heavyweight championship. In the first fight, he faced Marcin Wójcik. Haratyk won the fight via a first round TKO. He then facedDamian Piwowarczyk later in the night in the final round. Haratyk won the fight via Split Decision, and thus won the tournament, and claimed his first career championship.

His first title defense came on November 16, 2024 in a rematch against Marcin Wójcik. Haratyk successfully defended his championship via a second round KO.

Haratyk was scheduled to face former champion Ibragim Chuzhigaev on April 26, 2025, however Haratyk suffered an eye injury, and the bout was canceled.

His second title defense came on October 18, 2025 against Bartosz Leśko. Haratyk won the fight via a Unanimous Decision, successfully defending his title.

His third title defense came on July 18, 2026, against Bartosz Leśko in a rematch. Haratyk lost the Fight via a Unanimous Decision, losing the championship in the process. Despite the loss, this performance earned him his first career Fight of the Night bonus.

== Championships and accomplishments ==
=== Mixed martial arts ===
==== Konfrontacja Sztuk Walki ====
- KSW Light Heavyweight Championship (One time; former)
  - Two successful title defenses
- KSW 2024 Light Heavyweight Tournament winner
- Fight of the Night (One time)

== Mixed martial arts record ==
Professional record breakdown
29 matches	21 wins	6 losses
By knockout	7	3
By submission	5	2
By decision	9	1
Draws	2	

Res.	Record	Opponent	Method	Event	Date	Round	Time	Location	Notes
Loss	21–6–2	Bartosz Leśko	Decision (unanimous)	KSW 120	July 18, 2026	5	5:00	Gdynia, Poland	Lost the KSW Light Heavyweight Championship. Fight of the Night.
Win	21–5–2	Bartosz Leśko	Decision (unanimous)	KSW 111	October 18, 2025	5	5:00	Třinec, Czech Republic	Defended the KSW Light Heavyweight Championship.
Win	20–5–2	Marcin Wójcik	KO (punches)	KSW 100	November 16, 2024	2	3:22	Gliwice, Poland	Defended the KSW Light Heavyweight Championship.
Win	19–5–2	Damian Piwowarczyk	Decision (split)	KSW Epic: Khalidov vs. Adamek	February 24, 2024	3	5:00	Gliwice, Poland	Won the vacant KSW Light Heavyweight Championship and the 2024 KSW Light Heavyweight Tournament.
Win	18–5–2	Marcin Wójcik	TKO (punches)	KSW Epic: Khalidov vs. Adamek	February 24, 2024	1	4:05	Gliwice, Poland	2024 KSW Light Heavyweight Tournament Semifinal.
Win	17–5–2	Ivan Erslan	KO (punches)	KSW 87	October 14, 2023	1	4:21	Třinec, Czech Republic	Light Heavyweight debut.
Loss	16–5–2	Abdoul Abdouraguimov	Submission (kneebar)	Ares FC 11	January 20, 2023	5	4:35	Paris, France	For the vacant Ares FC Middleweight championship.
Win	16–4–2	Vitaliy Nemchinov	Technical Decision (unanimous)	ACA 136	February 26, 2022	3	1:02	Moscow, Russia	Accidental clash of heads rendered Haratyk unable to continue.
Win	15–4–2	Azamat Bekoev	Submission (scarf hold)	ACA 128	September 11, 2021	3	3:33	Minsk, Belarus	
Win	14–4–2	Piotr Strus	Decision (unanimous)	ACA 122	April 23, 2021	3	5:00	Minsk, Belarus	
Loss	13–4–2	Nikola Dipchikov	KO (punches)	ACA 114	November 26, 2020	1	3:44	Łódź, Poland	
Win	13–3–2	Piotr Strus	TKO (punches)	ACA 109	August 20, 2020	1	2:29	Łódź, Poland	
Win	12–3–2	Arbi Agujev	TKO (doctor stoppage)	ACA 102	November 29, 2019	1	5:00	Almaty, Kazakhstan	
Win	11–3–2	Maciej Różański	Decision (unanimous)	Babilon MMA 6	December 15, 2018	3	5:00	Raszyn, Poland	
Win	10–3–2	Marcin Naruszczka	Decision (unanimous)	Babilon MMA 5	August 18, 2018	3	5:00	Międzyzdroje, Poland	
Win	9–3–2	Johan Romming	Decision (unanimous)	Babilon MMA 3	March 16, 2018	3	5:00	Radom, Poland	Catchweight (190 lb) bout.
Win	8–3–2	Łukasz Bieńkowski	Decision (split)	Babilon MMA 2	December 2, 2017	3	5:00	Legionowo, Poland	
Loss	7–3–2	Dricus du Plessis	Submissiom (guillotine choke)	EFC 56	December 9, 2016	2	3:34	Johannesburg, South Africa	
Win	7–2–2	Gordon Roodman	TKO (punches)	EFC 50	June 17, 2016	1	4:44	Gauteng, South Africa	Catchweight (198 lb) bout.
Loss	6–2–2	Marcin Naruszczka	TKO (punches)	Fight Exclusive Night 11	March 19, 2016	2	2:36	Warsaw, Poland	
Win	6–1–2	Warren Allison	Submission (guillotine choke)	EFC 43	August 27, 2015	1	4:50	Durban, South Africa	
Win	5–1–2	Keron Davies	Submission (rear-naked choke)	EFC 38	April 4, 2015	1	2:36	Durban, South Africa	
Win	4–1–2	Mazvydas Pieza	Decision (unanimous)	PLMMA 32	May 10, 2014	3	5:00	Olsztyn, Poland	
Draw	3–1–2	Oskar Piechota	Draw (split)	No Contest: Professional Support MMA	November 9, 2013	3	5:00	Kwidzyn, Poland	
Loss	3–1–1	Omari Akhmedov	KO (punch)	Tech-Krep FC: Battle of Stars 1	December 22, 2012	1	2:26	Makhachkala, Russia	
Win	3–0–1	Mateusz Strojek	TKO (punch)	Prime FC 1	June 11, 2012	2	2:45	Mielec, Poland	
Draw	2–0–1	Marcin Gułaś	Draw (split)	Ring XF 3	March 5, 2011	3	5:00	Łódź, Poland	
Win	2–0	Marcin Mencel	TKO (submission to punches)	Fight Night Łobez 1	October 23, 2010	1	2:04	Łobez, Poland	
Win	1–0	Mateusz Pogudz	Submission (rear-naked choke)	Ring XF 2	May 30, 2010	1	0:57	Łódź, Poland	Middleweight debut.
