= Fight Exclusive Night =

MMA promoter based in Poland

FEN MMA
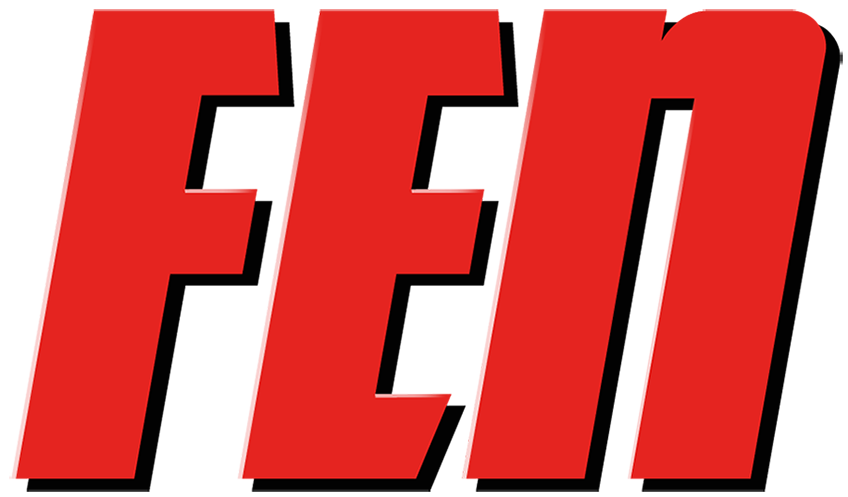
- Sport: Mixed martial arts promotion
- Founded: 2013; 13 years ago
- Founder: Paweł Jóźwiak; Rafał Sawicki; Kamil Birka; Bartosz Szuba; Łukasz Paluch
- Owner: Private
- Countries: Poland
- Headquarters: Wrocław, Poland
- Website: fen-mma.com/en/home/

Fight Exclusive Night (Polish: Ekskluzywna Noc Walki), better known by its initials FEN, is Polish mixed martial arts and K-1 promotion based in Wrocław.

== History ==
Paweł Jóźwiak, Rafał Sawicki, Kamil Birka, Bartosz Szuba and Łukasz Paluch founded organization in 2013. The first FEN gala took place on November 16, 2013, at the Stadion Wrocław Business Club.

In 2014, FEN established cooperation with Polsat television.

On March 6, 2015, the first fight for the Fight Exclusive Night championship belt took place at the FEN 6 gala. In the fight for the title of bantamweight champion (up to 61 kg), Tymoteusz Świątek and the Victor Marinho faced each other, the Portuguese won by knockout in the fifth round.

Since 2018, the main sponsors of the organization are state-owned companies Lotos and Energa Orlen.

In September 2019, Tomasz Babiloński, the owner of Babilon MMA, announced cooperation with Fight Exclusive Night, which took place at the October gala Babilon MMA 10: Underground Circle in the Wieliczka Salt Mine, where in the main fight Babilon MMA featherweight champion Daniel Rutkowski faced FEN featherweight champion Adrian Zieliński for both organizations belts. The winner of this fight was popular "Rutek" from Radom, defeating his rival by unanimous decision. More than a year later, there was a rematch between these two, this time at the FEN 31: Lotos Fight Night Łódź event. Initially, the fight was supposed to be for two championship belts (held by Rutkowski), but Zieliński did not meet the weight limit, so this status was removed. On November 28, 2020, Rutkowski won for the second time with the same verdict as before.

On June 13, 2020, the FEN 28: Lotos Fight Night gala took place, which was the first PPV gala in the history of the organization. During this event, in the fight for the historic heavyweight championship belt, the British Oli Thompson knocked out Szymon Bajor with a right hook, thus becoming the first federation champion in the royal category.

On February 24, 2024, the FEN federation issued a statement informing that the current president, Paweł Jóźwiak, will cease to perform this function in favor of the organization's matchmaker, Jakub Borowicz. Three weeks later, the new president announced and presented new changes that would be introduced at future Fen galas. Already during the upcoming FEN 53 gala, fans could see the first ever main event (fight of the evening) without a belt over a distance of 5 rounds, in addition, after each round in each fight, the 1st and 2nd rounds, the point cards of the fighting players would be visible to the fans, and the fighters of each gala were weighed on the same day as the fights.

== List of FEN events ==
=== Past events ===
No.	Event	Date	Venue	Location
1	FEN 1: Grudniewski vs. Szulakowski	November 16, 2013	Stadion Wrocław	Wrocław, Poland
2	FEN 2: Bartnik vs. Dembler	March 8, 2014	Stadion Wrocław	Wrocław, Poland
3	FEN 3: The War is Coming	June 28, 2014	Hala Stulecia	Wrocław, Poland
4	FEN 4: Summer Edition	August 16, 2014	Hala Stulecia Sopot	Sopot, Poland
5	FEN 5: Cuprum Heroes	January 10, 2015	Hala RCS	Lubin, Poland
6	FEN 6: Showtime	March 6, 2015	Hala Orbita	Wrocław, Poland
7	FEN 7: Real Combat	April 24, 2015	Artego Arena	Bydgoszcz, Poland
8	FEN 8: Summer Edition	July 31, 2015	Hala Milenium	Kołobrzeg, Poland
9	FEN 9: Go For It	November 7, 2015	Hala Orbita	Wrocław, Poland
10	FEN 10: Gold Edition	January 9, 2016	Hala RCS	Lubin, Poland
11	FEN 11: Warsaw Time	March 19, 2016	Hala Torwar	Warsaw, Poland
12	FEN 12: Feel The Force	May 20, 2016	Hala Stulecia	Wrocław, Poland
13	FEN 13: Summer Edition	August 13, 2016	Gdynia Arena	Gdynia, Poland
14	FEN 14: Silesian Rage	October 15, 2016	Spodek	Katowice, Poland
15	FEN 15: Final Strike	January 14, 2017	Hala RCS	Lubin, Poland
16	FEN 16: Warsaw Reloaded	March 11, 2017	Hala Torwar	Warsaw, Poland
17	FEN 17: Baltic Storm	May 12, 2017	Gdynia Arena	Gdynia, Poland
18	FEN 18: Summer Edition	August 12, 2017	Hala Widowiskowo-Sportowa w Koszalinie	Koszalin, Poland
19	FEN 19: Battle for Wrocław	October 14, 2017	Hala Orbita	Wrocław, Poland
20	FEN 20: Next Level	March 10, 2018	Hala Torwar	Warsaw, Poland
21	FEN 21: Grzebyk vs. Vieira	May 25, 2018	Hala Orbita	Wrocław, Poland
22	FEN 22: Poznań Fight Night	October 20, 2018	Hala UAM	Poznań, Poland
23	FEN 23: Rebecki vs. Imavov	January 12, 2019	Hala RCS	Lubin, Poland
24	FEN 24: All or Nothing	March 16, 2019	Hala Torwar	Warsaw, Poland
25	FEN 25: Ostróda Fight Night	June 15, 2019	Amfiteatr w Ostródzie	Ostróda, Poland
26	FEN 26: The Greatness	October 12, 2019	Hala Orbita	Wrocław, Poland
27	FEN 27: Rębecki vs. Magomedov	January 18, 2020	Netto Arena	Szczecin, Poland
28	FEN 28: Lotos Fight Night	June 13, 2020	Hala Globus	Lublin, Poland
29	FEN 29: Lotos Fight Night Ostróda	August 22, 2020	Amfiteatr w Ostródzie	Ostróda, Poland
30	FEN 30: Lotos Fight Night Wrocław	October 3, 2020	Hala Orbita	Wrocław, Poland
31	FEN 31: Lotos Fight Night Łódź	November 28, 2020	Hotel Hilton	Łódź, Poland
32	FEN 32: Lotos Fight Night Warszawa	February 20, 2021	Hotel Hilton	Warsaw, Poland
33	FEN 33: Lotos Fight Night Warszawa	March 27, 2021	Hotel Hilton	Łódź, Poland
34	FEN 34: Totalbet Fight Night	May 28, 2021	Hotel Hilton	Warsaw, Poland
35	FEN 35: Lotos Fight Night Ostróda	June 26, 2021	Amfiteatr w Ostródzie	Ostróda, Poland
36	FEN 36: Fight Night Szczecin	October 16, 2021	Netto Arena	Szczecin, Poland
37	FEN 37: Energa Fight Night Wrocław	November 27, 2021	Hala Orbita	Wrocław, Poland
38	FEN 38: Lotos Fight Night	January 22, 2022	Arena Ostrów	Ostrów Wielkopolski, Poland
39	FEN 39: Lotos Fight Night	March 12, 2022	Hala MOSiR	Ząbki, Poland
40	FEN 40: Energa Fight Night Ostróda	June 18, 2022	Amfiteatr w Ostródzie	Ostróda, Poland
41	FEN 41: Tauron Fight Night Mrągowo	August 27, 2022	Amfiteatr Mrągowo	Mrągowo, Poland
42	FEN 42: Tauron Fight Night Wrocław	October 15, 2022	Hala Orbita	Wrocław, Poland
43	FEN 43: Energa Fight Night Szczecin	December 16, 2022	Netto Arena	Szczecin, Poland
44	FEN 44: Orlen Paliwa Fight Night	January 28, 2023	Arena Ostrów	Ostrów Wielkopolski, Poland
45	FEN 45: Tauron Fight Night Ząbki	March 11, 2023	Hala w Szkole Podstawowej nr 6	Ząbki, Poland
46	FEN 46: Kuberski vs. Wojciechowski	May 27, 2023	Hala Widowiskowo-Sportowa	Piła, Poland
47	FEN 47: Orlen Paliwa Fight Night	June 17, 2023	Amfiteatr w Ostródzie	Ostróda, Poland
48	FEN 48: Wójcik vs. Wieczorek	August 18, 2023	Hala Widowiskowo-Sportowa	Jastrzębie-Zdrój, Poland
49	FEN 49: Fight Night Mrągowo	August 25, 2023	Amfiteatr Mrągowo	Mrągowo, Poland
50	FEN 50: Tauron Fight Night	September 2, 2023	Gliwice Arena	Gliwice, Poland
51	FEN 51: KGHM Fight Night	October 14, 2023	Hala RCS	Lubin, Poland
52	FEN 52: Łazarz vs. Szewczyk 2	February 17, 2024	Arena Ostrów	Ostrów Wielkopolski, Poland
53	FEN 53: KGHM Fight Night	March 16, 2024	Hala RCS	Lubin, Poland
54	FEN 54: Yakimenko vs. Alibabazade	May 17, 2024	Hala MOSiR w Pile	Piła, Poland
55	FEN 55: Abdurzakov vs Pietrzak	June 15, 2024	Amfiteatr w Ostródzie	Ostróda, Poland
56	FEN 56: Wrocław Fight Night	October 5, 2024	Hala Orbita	Wrocław, Poland
57	FEN 57: Rzepecki vs. Jabłoński	November 23, 2024	Hala Relax	Piotrków Trybunalski, Poland
58	FEN 58: Bartnik vs Jędraszczyk	March 1, 2025	Hala Sportowa	Częstochowa, Poland
59	FEN 59: Rzepecki vs Duński	June 21, 2025	Hala RCS	Lubin, Poland
60	FEN 60: Ostrowski vs. Janur	November 8, 2025	Hala Relax	Piotrków Trybunalski, Poland
61	FEN 61: Sosnowski vs. Kostrzewa	January 23, 2026	Hala Legionów	Kielce, Poland
62	FEN 62: Bartnik vs. Błachuta	March 28, 2026	Hala Sportowa	Częstochowa, Poland
63	FEN 63: Kruk vs. Sowiński	September 26, 2026	Hala MCSiR	Skarżysko-Kamienna, Poland

=== Event locations ===
- The following cities have hosted a total of 61 FEN events as of FEN 63: Kruk vs. Sowiński (26.9.2026.)
Poland (total: 62)
- Lower Silesian Voivodeship, (20)
  - Wrocław, Hala Orbita (9)
  - Lubin, Hala RCS (7)
  - Wrocław, Hala Stulecia (2)
  - Wrocław, Stadion Wrocław (2)
- Masovian Voivodeship, (8)
  - Warsaw, Hala Torwar (4)
  - Warsaw, Hilton Hotel (2)
  - Ząbki, Hala MOSiR (2)
- Warmian-Masurian Voivodeship, (8)
  - Ostróda, Amfiteatr w Ostródzie (6)
  - Mrągowo, Amfiteatr Mrągowo (2)
- Greater Poland Voivodeship, (6)
  - Ostrów Wielkopolski, Arena Ostrów (3)
  - Piła, Hala MOSiR (2)
  - Poznań, Hala UAM (1)
- Silesian Voivodeship, (5)
  - Częstochowa, Hala Sportowa (2)
  - Gliwice, Gliwice Arena (1)
  - Jastrzębie-Zdrój, Hala Widowiskowo-Sportowa (1)
  - Katowice, Spodek (1)
- West Pomeranian Voivodeship, (5)
  - Szczecin, Netto Arena (3)
  - Kołobrzeg, Hala Milenium (1)
  - Koszalin, Hala Widowiskowo-sportowa (1)
- Łódź Voivodeship, (4)
  - Łódź, Hilton Hotel (2)
  - Piotrków Trybunalski, Hala Relax (2)
- Pomeranian Voivodeship, (3)
  - Gdynia, Gdynia Arena (2)
  - Sopot, Hala Stulecia Sopot (1)
- Holy Cross Voivodeship, (2)
  - Kielce, Hala Legionów (1)
  - Skarżysko-Kamienna, Hala MCSiR (1)
- Kuyavian-Pomeranian Voivodeship, (1)
  - Bydgoszcz, Grupa Moderator Arena (1)
- Lublin Voivodeship, (1)
  - Lublin, Hala Globus (1)

== Current champions ==
=== Men ===
Category	Champion	Since	Number of defenses
Heavyweight-120 kg (264.6 lb; 18.9 st)	(N/A) Vacant	—N/a	—N/a
Light Heavyweight-93 kg (205.0 lb; 14.6 st)	(Poland) Łukasz Olech	September 26, 2026; FEN 63	—N/a
Middleweight-84 kg (185.2 lb; 13.2 st)	(N/A) Vacant	—N/a	—N/a
Welterweight-77 kg (169.8 lb; 12.1 st)	(Poland) Wawrzyniec Bartnik	November 23, 2024; FEN 57	2
Lightweight-70 kg (154.3 lb; 11.0 st)	(N/A) Vacant	—N/a	—N/a
Featherweight-66 kg (145.5 lb; 10.4 st)	(Poland) Miłosz Kruk	June 21, 2025; FEN 59	—N/a
Featherweight-66 kg (145.5 lb; 10.4 st)	(Poland) Michał Borowski	September 26, 2026; FEN 63	—N/a
Bantamweight-61 kg (134.5 lb; 9.6 st)	(N/A) Vacant	—N/a	—N/a
Flyweight-57 kg (125.7 lb; 9.0 st)	(N/A) Vacant	—N/a	—N/a

=== Women ===
Category	Champion	Since	Number of defenses
Female Featherweight-66 kg (145.5 lb; 10.4 st)	(N/A) Vacant	—N/a	—N/a
Female Bantamweight-61.2 kg (134.9 lb; 9.6 st)	(N/A) Vacant	—N/a	—N/a
Female Flyweight-56.7 kg (125.0 lb; 8.9 st)	(N/A) Vacant	—N/a	—N/a
Female Strawweight-52 kg (114.6 lb; 8.2 st)	(N/A) Vacant	—N/a	—N/a

=== Kick-Boxing / K-1 ===
Category	Champion	Since	Number of defenses
Heavyweight - 120 kg (264.6 lb; 18.9 st)	(N/A) Vacant	—N/a	—N/a
Light Heavyweight - 95 kg (209.4 lb; 15.0 st)	(N/A) Vacant	—N/a	—N/a
Middleweight - 85 kg (187.4 lb; 13.4 st)	(N/A) Vacant	—N/a	—N/a
Welterweight - 77 kg (169.8 lb; 12.1 st)	(N/A) Vacant	—N/a	—N/a
Lightweight - 70 kg (154.3 lb; 11.0 st)	(N/A) Vacant	—N/a	—N/a
Featherweight - 65 kg (143.3 lb; 10.2 st)	(N/A) Vacant	—N/a	—N/a

== Championship History ==
=== MMA ===
==== Heavyweight ====
120 kg (264.6 lb; 18.9 st)

No.	Name	Event	Date	Defenses
1	(England) Oli Thompson def. Szymon Bajor	FEN 28; Lublin, Poland	June 13, 2020	—N/a
interim	(Poland) Szymon Bajor def. Bartosz Szewczyk	FEN 37; Wrocław, Poland	November 27, 2021	—N/a
Thompsons stripped off title due to defeats outside of FEN and Bajor vacated interim belt after signing for PFL
2	(Poland) Michał Andryszak def. Eder de Souza	FEN 42; Wrocław, Poland	October 15, 2022	—N/a
Belt vacated after Andryszak left FEN for PFL

==== Light Heavyweight ====
93 kg (205.0 lb; 14.6 st)

No.	Name	Event	Date	Defenses
1	(Poland) Przemysław Mysiala def. Marcin Zontek	FEN 12; Wrocław, Poland	May 20, 2016	—N/a
Mysiala stripped off title due to inactivity
During the FEN 29 gala, the fight for the championship belt between Adam Kowalski and Marcin Łazarz was considered No Contest, therefore the champion was not selected
2	(Poland) Marcin Wójcik def. Adam Kowalski	FEN 31; Łódź, Poland	November 28, 2020	—N/a
3	(Brazil) Eder de Souza def. Marcin Wójcik	FEN 36; Szczecin, Poland	October 16, 2021	—N/a
4	(Poland) Marcin Łazarz def. Eder de Souza	FEN 50; Gliwice, Poland	September 2, 2023	—N/a
5	(Poland) Bartosz Szewczyk def. Marcin Łazarz	FEN 52; Ostrów Wielkopolski, Poland	February 17, 2024	—N/a
Szewczyk vacated belt after signing for DWCS
6	(Poland) Łukasz Olech def. Marcin Filipczak	FEN 63; Skarżysko-Kamienna, Poland	September 26, 2026	—N/a

==== Middleweight ====
84 kg (185.2 lb; 13.2 st)

No.	Name	Event	Date	Defenses
1	(Poland) Andrzej Grzebyk def. Thiago Vieira	FEN 21; Wrocław, Poland	May 25, 2018	1. def. Robert Fonseca at FEN 26 on October 12, 2019 in Wrocław, Poland
Grzebyk vacated belt after his contract with FEN ended
2	(Poland) Piotr Kuberski def. Marcin Naruszczka	FEN 40; Ostróda, Poland	June 18, 2022	1. def. Marcin Filipczak at FEN 44 on January 28, 2023, in Ostrów Wielkopolski, Poland; 2. def. Kamil Wojciechowski at FEN 46 on May 27, 2023, in Piła, Poland
Belt vacated after Kuberski fulfilled his contract with FEN and signed for KSW
3	(Poland) Tomasz Ostrowski def. Łukasz Stanek	FEN 56; Wrocław, Poland	October 5, 2024	—N/a
interim	(Poland) Mateusz Janur def. Michał Pietrzak	FEN 59; Lubin, Poland	June 21, 2025	—N/a
4	(Poland) Mateusz Janur def. Tomasz Ostrowski	FEN 60; Piotrków Trybunalski, Poland	November 8, 2025	—N/a
Belt vacated after Janur fulfilled his contract with FEN

==== Welterweight ====
77 kg (169.8 lb; 12.1 st)

No.	Name	Event	Date	Defenses
1	(France) Davy Gallon def. Michał Michalski	FEN 12; Wrocław, Poland	May 20, 2016	—N/a
Title vacated after Gallon changed weight category.
2	(Poland) Andrzej Grzebyk def. Kamil Gniadek	FEN 24; Warsaw, Poland	March 16, 2019	—N/a
3	(Poland) Robert Bryczek def. Virgiliu Frasineac	FEN 30; Wrocław, Poland	October 3, 2020	—N/a
4	(Poland) Cezary Oleksiejczuk def. Ajgun Akhmiedov	FEN 37; Wrocław, Poland	November 27, 2021	1. def. Kamil Kraska at FEN 40 on June 18, 2022, in Ostróda, Poland; 2. def. Adrian Zieliński at FEN 42 on October 15, 2022, in Wrocław, Poland; 3. def. Mansur Abdurzakov at FEN 45 on March 11, 2023, in Ząbki, Poland
Oleksiejczuk stripped off title due to defeat outside of organization
5	(Poland) Mansur Abdurzakov def. Michal Pietrzak	FEN 55; Ostróda, Poland	June 15, 2024	—N/a
6	(Poland) Wawrzyniec Bartnik	FEN 57; Piotrków Trybunalski, Poland	November 23, 2024	1. def. Jacek Jędraszczyk at FEN 58 on March 1, 2025, in Częstochowa, Poland; 2. def. Rafał Błachuta at FEN 62 on March 28, 2026, in Częstochowa, Poland

==== Lightweight ====
70 kg (154.3 lb; 11.0 st)

No.	Name	Event	Date	Defenses
1	(Poland) Roman Szymański def. Marian Ziółkowski	FEN 11; Warsaw, Poland	March 19, 2016	—N/a
2	(Brazil) Joilton Santos def. Roman Szymański	FEN 14; Katowice, Poland	October 15, 2016	—N/a
Santos stripped off title due to defeats outside of FEN
3	(Poland) Mateusz Rębecki def. Marian Ziółkowski	FEN 20; Warsaw, Poland	March 10, 2018	1. def. Łukasz Kopera at FEN 22 on October 20, 2018, in Poznań, Poland; 2. def. Daguir Imavov at FEN 23 on January 12, 2019, in Wrocław, Poland; 3. def. Magomed Magomedov at FEN 27 on January 18, 2020, in Szczecin, Poland; 4. def. Fabiano Silva at FEN 28 on June 13, 2020, in Lublin, Poland; 5. def. Jose Barrios Vargas at FEN 32 on February 20, 2021, in Warsaw, Poland; 6. def. Felipe Maia at FEN 36 on October 16, 2021, in Szczecin, Poland; 7. def. Arkady Osipjan at FEN 37 on November 27, 2021, in Wrocław, Poland
Title vacated after Rębecki signed for UFC.
4	(Poland) Łukasz Charzewski def. Anatoliy Zhurakivskiy	FEN 42; Wrocław, Poland	October 15, 2022	1. def. Patryk Duński at FEN 47 on June 17, 2023, in Ostróda, Poland
Title vacated after Charzewski was stripped off title and signed for KSW.
5	(Poland) Damian Rzepecki def. Marcin Jabłoński	FEN 57; Piotrków Trybunalski, Poland	November 23, 2024	1. def. Patryk Duński at FEN 59 on June 21, 2025, in Lubin, Poland
Title vacated after Rzepecki signed for UFC.

==== Featherweight ====
66 kg (145.5 lb; 10.4 st)

No.	Name	Event	Date	Defenses
1	(Poland) Adrian Zieliński def. Fabiano Silva	FEN 25; Ostróda, Poland	June 15, 2019	—N/a
2	(Poland) Daniel Rutkowski def. Adrian Zieliński	Babilon MMA 10; Wieliczka, Poland	October 26, 2019	—N/a
Title vacated after Rutkowski fulfilled contract with FEN
3	(Poland) Kacper Formela def. Nicolae Hantea	FEN 39; Zabki, Poland	June 18, 2022	1. def. Aleksander Gorszecznik at FEN 40 on June 18, 2022, in Ostróda, Poland; 2. def. Pedro Nobre at FEN 43 on December 16, 2022, in Szczecin, Poland; 3. def. Nurzhan Akishev at FEN 47 on June 18, 2023, in Ostróda, Poland
Title vacated after Formela fulfilled his contract with FEN.
4	(Poland) Miłosz Kruk def. Gracjan Miś	FEN 59; Lubin, Poland	June 21, 2025	—N/a
interim	(Poland) Michał Borowski def. Gracjan Miś	FEN 63; Skarżysko-Kamienna, Poland	September 26, 2026	—N/a

==== Bantamweight ====
61.2 kg (134.9 lb; 9.6 st)

No.	Name	Event	Date	Defenses
1	(Portugal) Victor Marinho def. Tymoteusz Świątek	FEN 6 Wrocław, Poland	March 06, 2015	—N/a
Marinho stripped off title due to inactivity
2	(Denmark) Jonas Mågård def. Sebastian Romanowski	FEN 31; Łódź, Poland	November 28, 2020	—N/a
3	(South Africa) Frans Mlambo def. Jonas Mågård	FEN 34; Warsaw, Poland	May 28, 2021	—N/a
During FEN 42 gala, it was announced that Mlambo had vacated the belt and left FEN.

==== Flyweight ====
56.7 kg (125.0 lb; 8.9 st)

No.	Name	Event	Date	Defenses

==== Women Bantamweight ====
61.2 kg (134.9 lb; 9.6 st)

No.	Name	Event	Date	Defenses
1	(Ukraine) Ekaterina Shakalova def. Julia Kutsenko	FEN 38; Ostrów Wielkopolski, Poland	January 22, 2022	—N/a
Shakalova was stripped of the title after failing to make weight

=== Kickboxing / K-1 ===
==== Heavyweight ====
95 kg (209.4 lb; 15.0 st)

No.	Name	Event	Date	Defenses
1	(Poland) Arkadiusz Wrzosek def. Nikolaj Falin	FEN 38; Ostrów Wielkopolski, Poland	January 22, 2022	1. def. Artur Bizewski at FEN 20 on March 10, 2018 in Warsaw, Poland; 2. def. Patrick Schmid at FEN 24 on March 16, 2019 in Warsaw, Poland

==== Light Heavyweight ====
95 kg (209.4 lb; 15.0 st)

No.	Name	Event	Date	Defenses
1	(Poland) Tomasz Sarara def. Dennis Stolzenbach	FEN 14; Katowice, Poland	October 15, 2016	—N/a

==== Middleweight ====
85 kg (187.4 lb; 13.4 st)

No.	Name	Event	Date	Defenses
1	(Poland) Radosław Paczuski def. Dennis Stolzenbach	FEN 20; Warsaw, Poland	March 10, 2018	—N/a

==== Welterweight ====
77 kg (169.8 lb; 12.1 st)

No.	Name	Event	Date	Defenses
interim	(Poland) Wojciech Wierzbicki def. Zakaria Baitar	FEN 12; Wrocław, Poland	May 20, 2016	—N/a
1	(Poland) Paweł Biszczak def. Wojciech Wierzbicki	FEN 15; Lubin, Poland	January 14, 2017	1. def. Igor Danis at FEN 19 on October 14, 2017 in Wrocław, Poland
Biszczak terminated the contract with the organization
2	(Poland) Łukasz Pławecki def. Wojciech Wierzbicki	FEN 21; Wrocław, Poland	May 25, 2018	—N/a
3	(Poland) Dominik Zadora def. Łukasz Pławecki	FEN 23; Lubin, Poland	January 12, 2019	—N/a
4	(Poland) Wojciech Wierzbicki def. Dominik Zadora	FEN 26; Wrocław, Poland	October 12, 2019	—N/a
5	(Poland) Dominik Zadora def. Wojciech Wierzbicki	FEN 30; Wrocław, Poland	October 3, 2020	—N/a
6	(Armenia) Anatoli Hunanyan def. Dominik Zadora	FEN 37; Wrocław, Poland	November 27, 2021	—N/a

==== Women Featherweight ====
65 kg (143.3 lb; 10.2 st)

No.	Name	Event	Date	Defenses
1	(Poland) Róża Gumienna def. Martina Fendrichova	FEN 15; Lubin, Poland	January 14, 2017	—N/a
2	(Poland) Marta Waliczek def. Róża Gumienna	FEN 19; Wrocław, Poland	October 14, 2017	—N/a

== Rules ==
MMA

- Fights are fought on a special cage ring or in a cage
- Distance of 3 rounds, 5 minutes each, except for the fight of the evening, which is 5 rounds of 5 minutes each
- Distance of 5 rounds in fights for the champion belt of the FEN organization.

Kick-boxing (K-1 rules)

- Fights are fought on a special cage ring or in a cage
- Distance of three rounds, 3 minutes each
- Distance of five rounds in fights for the champion belt of the FEN organization

Ways to determine the winner in standard MMA rules

- knockout
- submission (tapping or verbal)
- technical submission
- technical knockout
- judges' decision
- disqualification

=== Weight Categories ===
MMA:

- Flyweight (to 56,7 kg / 125 lb)
- Bantamweight (to 61,2 kg / 135 lb)
- Featherweight (to 65,8 kg / 145 lb)
- Lightweight (to 70,3 kg / 155 lb)
- Welterweight (to 77,1 kg / 170lb)
- Middleweight (to 83,9 kg / 185 lb)
- Light Heavyweight (to 93 kg / 205 lb)
- Heavyweight (to 120 kg / 265 lb)

Kick-boxing (K-1 Rules)

- Women's featherweight (to 65 kg / 143 lb)
- Lightweight (to 70 kg / 154 lb)
- Welterweight (to 77 kg / 169 lb)
- Middleweight (to 85 kg / 187 lb)
- Light Heavyweight (to 95 kg / 209 lb)
- Heavyweight (over 95 kg / + 209 lb)

== Staff ==
Current members	Function	Former members
Bartosz Szuba	President	Paweł Jóźwiak; Jakub Borowicz
Vacant	Matchmaker	Jakub Borowicz
Rafał Sawicki	Owner	-
Kamil Birka	Owner	-
Bartosz Szuba	Owner	-
Łukasz Paluch	Owner	-
Paweł Jóźwiak	Owner	-
Patryk Trzaska	Ring announcer	-
Łukasz Jurkowski	Commentary	-
Andrzej Janisz	Commentary	-
Igor Marczak	Studio Host	-
Igor Marczak	Post-fight interviewer	-
Andrzej Gliniak Jakub Borowicz	Host of the weighing ceremonies	-

== Notable fighters ==
=== Poland ===
- Michał Andryszak
- Izabela Badurek
- Szymon Bajor
- Marcin Bandel
- Wojciech Bartnik
- Adrian Bartosiński
- Anita Bekus
- Krystian Bielski
- Paweł Biszczak
- Robert Bryczek
- Łukasz Charzewski
- Rafał Dudek
- Szymon Dusza
- Kacper Formela
- Kamil Gniadek
- Damian Grabowski
- Andrzej Grzebyk
- Róża Gumienna
- Rafał Haratyk
- Piotr Hallmann
- Hanna Gujwan
- Maciej Jewtuszko
- Rafał Kijańczuk
- Michał Kita
- Tomasz Kondraciuk
- Adam Kowalski
- Piotr Kuberski
- Krzysztof Kułak
- Marcin Krakowiak
- Kamil Kraska
- Miłosz Kruk
- Bartosz Leśko
- Rafał Lewoń
- Katarzyna Lubońska
- Marcin Łazarz
- Kamil Łebkowski
- Tymoteusz Łopaczyk
- Przemysław Mysiala
- Barbara Nalepka
- Marcin Naruszczka
- Michał Oleksiejczuk
- Cezary Oleksiejczuk
- Radosław Paczuski
- Paweł Pawlak
- Kamila Porczyk
- Mateusz Rębecki
- Lukasz Plawecki
- Tomasz Romanowski
- Daniel Rutkowski
- Łukasz Sudolski
- Bartosz Szewczyk
- Akop Szostak
- Grzegorz Szulakowski
- Roman Szymański
- Tymoteusz Świątek
- Paweł Trybała
- Adam Wieczorek
- Marcin Wójcik
- Kamil Wojciechowski
- Arkadiusz Wrzosek
- Marcin Wrzosek
- Dominik Zadora
- Adrian Zieliński
- Marian Ziółkowski

=== Other ===
- (Brazil) Eder de Souza
- (Brazil) Daniel Torres
- (Brazil) Joilton Santos
- (Brazil) Fabiano Silva
- (Brazil) Thiago Vieira
- (England) Oli Thompson
- (Montenegro) Vaso Bakočević
- (Czech Republic) Lukáš Chotěnovský
- (Denmark) Jonas Mågård
- (South Africa) Frans Mlambo
- (Finland) Toni Valtonen
- (France) Cyril Cereyon
- (France) Davy Gallon
- (France) Daguir Imavov
- (France) Nassourdine Imavov
- (Georgia (country)) Giorgi Esiava
- (Italy) Danilo Belluardo
- (Netherlands) Djamil Chan
- (Turkey) Aigun Achmiedov
- (Russia) Magomed Magomedov
- (Russia) Kirill Kornilov
- (Switzerland) Patrick Schmid
- (Croatia) Igor Pokrajac
- (Slovakia) Igor Danis
- (Ukraine) Kateryna Shakalova
