= Axel Sola =

French mixed martial artist (born 1997)

- Born: Axel Pierrick Sola; September 17, 1997 (age 29); Nice, France
- Height: 6 ft 0 in (1.83 m)
- Weight: 155 lb (70 kg; 11 st 1 lb)
- Division: Lightweight; Welterweight
- Reach: 74 in (188 cm)
- Fighting out of: Nice, France
- Team: Boxing Squad
- Years active: 2021–present

Mixed martial arts record
- Total: 15
- Wins: 13
- By knockout: 7
- By submission: 2
- By decision: 4
- Losses: 1
- By decision: 1
- Draws: 1

Other information
- Mixed martial arts record from Sherdog

Axel Pierrick Sola (born 17 September 1997) is a French mixed martial artist who currently competes in the Lightweight division of the Ultimate Fighting Championship (UFC).

== Background ==
Born in Nice, France, Sola trains out of Boxing Squad. He represents France.

Sola began training in martial arts at the age of 15, joining the Boxing Squad in Nice with encouragement from his uncle. As an amateur, he won a gold medal at the 2019 IMMAF European Open Championships and earned silver medals at the World Amateur Championships on two occasions. He trains under coach Jerome Vaulerin and later joined the KHK MMA Team in Bahrain to pursue a professional career.

== Mixed martial arts career ==
=== Early career ===
Sola began his professional MMA career in 2021, fighting for the Brave Combat Federation (BCF). He accumulated an undefeated promotional record of 5-0 across 2021 and 2022, securing notable wins against Wawrzyniec Bartnik, Yoon Sung-jang, Wladimir Holodenko, and Matheus Miranda.

=== Ares Fighting Championship ===
In 2023, Sola transitioned to Ares Fighting Championship (AFC). Over the next two years, he continued his unbeaten streak, scoring stoppage victories over Cesar Arzamendia, Turpal Younousov, Soslan Gagloev, and Lucas Caio. In June 2024, Sola fought to a five-round majority draw against Daguir Imavov. He rounded out his tenure in the promotion with a five-round unanimous decision win against Ghiles Oudelha in June 2025, successfully defending his title four times during this run.

=== Ultimate Fighting Championship ===
Sola made his UFC debut on 6 September 2025, taking on Rhys McKee at UFC Fight Night 258. He won the fight via technical knockout in the third round.

Sola faced Mason Jones on 21 March 2026 at UFC Fight Night 270. He lost the fight via unanimous decision, marking the first defeat of his professional MMA career. This fight earned him a $100,000 Fight of the Night award.

Rebounding from this loss, Sola fought Ismael Bonfim on 25 July 2026 at UFC Fight Night 282. He won the fight via D'Arce choke submission in the first round.

Sola faced Fares Ziam on 5 September 2026 at UFC Fight Night 287. He won the bout via technical knockout early in the first round following an overhand left and ground strikes. This fight earned him a $100,000 Performance of the Night award.

== Personal life ==
Sola was raised in a middle-class household in the eastern district of Nice, France. Both of his parents worked as nurses. He has three older sisters, all of whom followed traditional corporate and academic career trajectories. Prior to pursuing his mixed martial arts career full-time, he was employed as a deckhand on a yacht.

Following his mother’s early advice, he enrolled in a sports science faculty (STAPS). He spent five years at the university, earning both a bachelor’s degree (licence) and a master’s degree in sport science while concurrently competing on the amateur MMA circuit.

Outside of fighting, Sola enjoys scuba diving, which he uses for relaxation and as a breathing exercise to aid his performance. He has cited the fictional character Batman as a personal hero, stating that he views the character as an aspirational blueprint for his own life.

== Championships and accomplishments ==
=== Mixed martial arts ===
- Ultimate Fighting Championship
  - Fight of the Night (One time) vs. Mason Jones
  - Performance of the Night (One time) vs. Farès Ziam
- Ares Fighting Championship
  - Ares FC Lightweight Championship (One time; former)
    - Four successful title defenses

== Mixed martial arts record ==
Professional record breakdown
15 matches	13 wins	1 loss
By knockout	7	0
By submission	2	0
By decision	4	1
Draws	1	
No contests	0	

Res.	Record	Opponent	Method	Event	Date	Round	Time	Location	Notes
Win	13–1–1	Farès Ziam	KO (punch)	UFC Fight Night: Hooker vs. Parnasse	5 September 2026	1	1:40	Paris, France	Performance of the Night.
Win	12–1–1	Ismael Bonfim	Submission (brabo choke)	UFC Fight Night: Ankalaev vs. Guskov	25 July 2026	1	4:44	Abu Dhabi, United Arab Emirates	
Loss	11–1–1	Mason Jones	Decision (unanimous)	UFC Fight Night: Evloev vs. Murphy	21 March 2026	3	5:00	London, England	Fight of the Night.
Win	11–0–1	Rhys McKee	TKO (punches)	UFC Fight Night: Imavov vs. Borralho	6 September 2025	3	2:02	Paris, France	Welterweight bout.
Win	10–0–1	Ghiles Oudelha	Decision (unanimous)	Ares FC 31	14 June 2025	5	5:00	Marseille, France	Defended the Ares FC Lightweight Championship.
Win	9–0–1	Lucas Caio	TKO (punches and elbows)	Ares FC 28	18 January 2025	2	3:43	Nice, France	Defended the Ares FC Lightweight Championship. Performance of the Night.
Win	8–0–1	Soslan Gagloev	TKO (punches)	Ares FC 25	26 September 2024	2	4:59	Paris, France	Defended the Ares FC Lightweight Championship. Performance of the Night.
Draw	7–0–1	Daguir Imavov	Draw (majority)	Ares FC 22	14 June 2024	5	5:00	Paris, France	Retained the Ares FC Lightweight Championship. Fight of the Night.
Win	7–0	Turpal Younousov	TKO (punches)	Ares FC 18	15 December 2023	4	4:22	Levallois-Perret, France	Won the vacant Ares FC Lightweight Championship.
Win	6–0	Cesar Arzamendia	TKO (elbows)	Ares FC 16	23 June 2023	3	3:33	Paris, France	Lightweight debut.
Win	5–0	Matheus Miranda	TKO (punches)	Brave CF 68	17 December 2022	2	0:34	Düsseldorf, Germany	
Win	4–0	Wladimir Holodenko	Decision (unanimous)	Brave CF 61	6 August 2022	3	5:00	Bonn, Germany	
Win	3–0	Jang Yun-seong	Decision (unanimous)	Brave CF 58	30 April 2022	3	5:00	Incheon, South Korea	Welterweight debut.
Win	2–0	Wawrzyniec Bartnik	Decision (unanimous)	Brave CF 54	25 September 2021	3	5:00	Konin, Poland	
Win	1–0	Kuitty Begaj	Submission (arm-triangle choke)	Brave CF 49	25 March 2021	1	4:59	Arad, Bahrain	Super Welterweight debut.

== See also ==
- List of current UFC fighters
- List of male mixed martial artists
