= Bartosz Leśko =

Polish mixed martial artist (born 1996)

- Born: Bartosz Leśko; 28 April 1996 (age 30); Gdynia, Poland
- Height: 6 ft 2 in (1.88 m)
- Weight: 205 lb (93 kg; 14 st 9 lb)
- Division: Middleweight (2015–2024); Light Heavyweight (2018, 2019, 2022, 2024–present)
- Reach: 78.7 in (200 cm)
- Style: Karate
- Fighting out of: Gdynia, Poland
- Team: Mighty Bulls Gdynia
- Years active: 2015–present

Mixed martial arts record
- Total: 25
- Wins: 17
- By knockout: 2
- By submission: 7
- By decision: 7
- By disqualification: 1
- Losses: 6
- By knockout: 3
- By submission: 1
- By decision: 2
- Draws: 2

Other information
- Mixed martial arts record from Sherdog

Bartosz Leśko (born 28 April 1996) is a Polish professional mixed martial artist. He is the current KSW Light Heavyweight champion. He has previously competed on Absolute Championship Akhmat (ACA) and Fight Exclusive Night (FEN MMA).

== Professional career ==
=== Early career ===
Leśko made his professional debut on January 17, 2015, against Marek Michaluk. Leśko won the fight via a first-round submission.

His next fight came on October 24, 2015, against Mikołaj Dziąbor. Leśko won the fight via a first-round TKO.

His next fight came on December 19, 2015, against Robert Maciejowski. The bout ended in a Majority Draw.

=== Time of Masters ===
Leśko returned to Time of Masters, the federation which he made his professional debut under, on March 12, 2016, against Tomasz Kubczak. Leśko won the fight via a second-round TKO.

His next fight came on November 19, 2016, against Maciej Szydłowski. Leśko won the fight via a first-round submission.

=== Fight Exclusive Night ===
Leśko made his debut under Fight Exclusive Night (FEN MMA) on May 12, 2017, against Aleksander Rychlik. Leśko won the fight via a second-round submission. This performance earned him his first career Submission of the Night bonus.

His next fight came on October 14, 2017, against Paweł Brandys. Leśko won the fight via a Unanimous Decision.

His next fight came on March 10, 2018, against Marcin Naruszczka. Leśko lost the fight via a Unanimous Decision, suffering his first career defeat in the process.

His next fight came on May 25, 2018 against Kevin Wiwatowski. Leśko won the fight via a first-round submission.

His next fight came on October 20, 2018, against Tomasz Kondraciuk. Leśko won the fight via a first-round submission. This performance earned him his second career Submission of the Night bonus.

His next fight came on March 16, 2019, in a rematch against Marcin Naruszczka. The bout ended in a Split Draw.

His final fight with the federation came on June 15, 2019, in a rematch against Kevin Wiwatowski. Leśko won the fight via a first-round submission.

=== Absolute Championship Akhmat ===
Leśko made his debut under Russian federation Absolute Championship Akhmat on November 26, 2020, against Rene Pessoa. Leśko won the fight via a Unanimous Decision.

His next fight came on September 11, 2021, against Ibragim Magomedov. Leśko won the fight via a first-round disqualification, after Magomedov landed an illegal knee.

His final fight with the federation came on December 17, 2021, against Khusein Kushagov. Leśko lost the fight via a second-round knockout.

=== Konfrontacja Sztuk Walki ===
On May 11, 2022, it was announced that Leśko had signed a contract with Konfrontacja Sztuk Walki (KSW).

His first fight with the federation came two weeks later on May 28, against Damian Piwowarczyk. Leśko won the fight via a Unanimous Decision.

His next fight came on March 17, 2023, against Tom Breese. Leśko lost the fight via a first-round submission.

His next fight came on July 15, 2023, against Nemanja Nikolić. Leśko won the fight via a first-round submission. This performance earned him his third career Submission of the Night bonus.

His next fight came on November 11, 2023, against Piotr Kuberski. Leśko lost the fight via a third-round TKO.

His next fight came on May 11, 2024, against Michał Michalski. Leśko lost the fight via a first-round TKO.

His next fight came on September 14, 2024, against Dominik Humburger, stepping in on fight night for a medically uncleared Bogdan Gnidko. Leśko won the fight via a Unanimous Decision. This performance earned him his first Performance of the Night bonus.

His next fight came on March 8, 2025, against Maciej Różański. Leśko won the fight via a Unanimous Decision.

Leśko faced Rafał Haratyk for Haratyk's KSW Light Heavyweight Championship on October 18, 2025. Leśko lost the fight via a Unanimous Decision, thus failing to capture the championship.

His next fight came on March 14, 2026, against Bartosz Szewczyk. Leśko won the fight via a Unanimous Decision.

=== KSW Light Heavyweight Champion ===
Leśko faced Rafał Haratyk in a rematch for Haratyk's KSW Light Heavyweight Championship on July 18, 2026. Leśko won the fight via a Unanimous Decision, winning his first career championship in the process. This performance earned him his first Fight of the Night bonus.

== Championships and accomplishments ==
=== Mixed martial arts ===
==== Konfrontacja Sztuk Walki ====
- KSW Light Heavyweight Championship (One time; current)
- Fight of the Night (One time)
- Performance of the Night (One time)
- Submission of the Night (One time)

==== Fight Exclusive Night ====
- Submission of the Night (Two times)

== Mixed martial arts record ==
Professional record breakdown
25 matches	17 wins	6 losses
By knockout	2	3
By submission	7	1
By decision	7	2
By disqualification	1	0
Draws	2	

Res.	Record	Opponent	Method	Event	Date	Round	Time	Location	Notes
Win	17–6–2	Rafał Haratyk	Decision (unanimous)	KSW 120	July 18, 2026	5	5:00	Gdynia, Poland	Won the KSW Light Heavyweight Championship. Fight of the Night.
Win	16–6–2	Bartosz Szewczyk	Decision (unanimous)	KSW 116	March 14, 2026	3	5:00	Gorzów Wielkopolski, Poland	
Loss	15–6–2	Rafał Haratyk	Decision (unanimous)	KSW 111	October 18, 2025	5	5:00	Třinec, Czech Republic	For the KSW Light Heavyweight Championship.
Win	15–5–2	Maciej Różański	Decision (unanimous)	KSW 104	March 8, 2025	3	5:00	Gorzów Wielkopolski, Poland	
Win	14–5–2	Dominik Humburger	Decision (unanimous)	KSW 98	September 14, 2024	3	5:00	Lubin, Poland	Return to Light Heavyweight. Performance of the Night.
Loss	13–5–2	Michał Michalski	TKO (punches)	KSW 94	May 11, 2024	1	1:46	Gdańsk, Poland	
Loss	13–4–2	Piotr Kuberski	KO (punches)	KSW 88	November 11, 2023	3	1:11	Radom, Poland	
Win	13–3–2	Nemanja Nikolić	Submission (rear-naked choke)	KSW 84	July 15, 2023	1	4:40	Gdynia, Poland	Submission of the Night.
Loss	12–3–2	Tom Breese	Submission (rear-naked choke)	KSW 80	March 17, 2023	1	2:45	Lubin, Poland	
Win	12–2–2	Damian Piwowarczyk	Decision (unanimous)	KSW 70	May 28, 2022	3	5:00	Łódź, Poland	Light Heavyweight bout.
Loss	11–2–2	Khusein Kushagov	KO (punch)	ACA 134	December 17, 2021	2	1:37	Krasnodar, Russia	
Win	11–1–2	Ibragim Magomedov	DQ (illegal knee)	ACA 128	September 11, 2021	1	3:14	Minsk, Belarus	
Win	10–1–2	Rene Pessoa	Decision (unanimous)	ACA 114	November 26, 2020	3	5:00	Łódź, Poland	Catchweight (188 lb) bout.
Win	9–1–2	Kevin Wiwatowski	Submission (rear-naked choke)	Fight Exclusive Night 25	June 15, 2019	1	4:16	Ostróda, Poland	Light Heavyweight bout.
Draw	8–1–2	Marcin Naruszczka	Draw (split)	Fight Exclusive Night 24	March 16, 2019	3	5:00	Warsaw, Poland	
Win	8–1–1	Tomasz Kondraciuk	Submission (rear-naked choke)	Fight Exclusive Night 22	October 20, 2018	1	4:15	Poznań, Poland	Return to Middleweight. Submission of the Night.
Win	7–1–1	Kevin Wiwatowski	Submission (rear-naked choke)	Fight Exclusive Night 21	May 25, 2018	1	2:53	Wrocław, Poland	Light Heavyweight debut.
Loss	6–1–1	Marcin Naruszczka	Decision (unanimous)	Fight Exclusive Night 20	March 10, 2018	3	5:00	Warsaw, Poland	
Win	6–0–1	Paweł Brandys	Decision (unanimous)	Fight Exclusive Night 19	October 14, 2017	3	5:00	Wrocław, Poland	
Win	5–0–1	Aleksander Rychlik	Submission (rear-naked choke)	Fight Exclusive Night 18	May 12, 2017	2	1:18	Gdynia, Poland	Submission of the Night.
Win	4–0–1	Maciej Szydłowski	Submission (rear-naked choke)	Time of Masters: Siemmce Fight Night	November 19, 2016	1	2:01	Siemianowice Śląskie, Poland	
Win	3–0–1	Tomasz Kubczak	TKO (punches)	Time of Masters 2	March 12, 2016	2	1:21	Sopot, Poland	
Draw	2–0–1	Robert Maciejowski	Draw (majority)	MMA Fight Night 4	December 19, 2015	3	5:00	Kołczewo, Poland	
Win	2–0	Mikołaj Dziąbor	TKO (punches)	Incredible Fighting Night 1	October 24, 2015	1	3:25	Częstochowa, Poland	
Win	1–0	Marek Michaluk	Submission (rear-naked choke)	Time of Masters 1	January 17, 2015	1	2:45	Sopot, Poland	Middleweight debut.

== See also ==
- List of current mixed martial arts champions
- List of male mixed martial artists
- List of current Konfrontacja Sztuk Walki fighters
