= 2020 in Absolute Championship Akhmat =

Mixed martial arts events

Information
- First date: February 21, 2020
- Last date: December 18, 2020

Events
- Total events: 13

Fights
- Title fights: 9

The year 2020 was the eighth year in the history of the Absolute Championship Akhmat, a mixed martial arts promotion based in Russia.

== List of events ==
ACA MMA
No.	Event	Date	Venue	Location
1	ACA 104: Goncharov vs. Vakhaev	February 21, 2020	Basket-Hall	Krasnodar, Russia
2	ACA 105: Shakhbulatov vs. Oliveira	March 6, 2020	Almaty Arena	Almaty, Kazakhstan
3	ACA 106: Abdulaev vs. Silvério	July 13, 2020	Sibur Arena	Saint Petersburg, Russia
4	ACA 107: Emelianenko vs. Ismailov	July 24, 2020		Sochi, Russia
5	ACA 108: Galiev vs. Adaev	August 8, 2020	Sports Hall Coliseum	Grozny, Russia
6	ACA 109: Omielańczuk vs. Pakutinskas	August 20, 2020	DoubleTree by Hilton Hotel Lodz	Łódź, Poland
7	ACA 110: Bagov vs. Abdulaev	September 5, 2020	Krylatskoye Sports Palace	Moscow, Russia
8	ACA 111: Abdulvakhabov vs. Sarnavskiy	September 19, 2020	Krylatskoye Sports Palace	Moscow, Russia
9	ACA 112: Oliveira vs. Dudaev	October 4, 2020	Sports Hall Coliseum	Grozny, Russia
10	ACA 113: Kerefov vs. Gadzhiev	November 6, 2020	VTB Arena	Moscow, Russia
11	ACA 114: Omielańczuk vs. Johnson	November 26, 2020	DoubleTree by Hilton Hotel Lodz	Łódź, Poland
12	ACA 115: Ismailov vs. Shtyrkov	December 12, 2020	VTB Arena	Moscow, Russia
13	ACA 116: Froes vs Balaev	December 18, 2020	VTB Arena	Moscow, Russia

== ACA 104: Goncharov vs. Vakhaev ==
ACA 104: Goncharov vs. Vakhaev
- Promotion: Absolute Championship Akhmat
- Date: February 21, 2020
- Venue: Basket-Hall
- City: Krasnodar, Russia

Absolute Championship Akhmat 104: Goncharov vs. Vakhaev was a mixed martial arts event held by Absolute Championship Akhmat on February 21, 2020, at the Basket-Hall in Krasnodar, Russia.

=== Background ===
An ACA Heavyweight Championship bout between current champion Evgeniy Goncharov and former champion Mukhumat Vakhaev served as the ACA 104 main event. The pairing were supposed to have met previously in March 2018 at ACA 94, but Vakhaev was unable to compete due to health problems.

Bonus awards:

The following fighters were awarded $10,000 bonuses:

- Fight of the Night: Apti Bimarzaev vs. Alexey Polpudnikov
- Knockout of the Night: Artem Frolov
- Submission of the Night: Maycon Silvan
- $5000 Stoppage Victory Bonuses: Cleverson Silva, Bibert Tumenov, Ramazan Kishev, Mukhamed Kokov, Murad Zeynulabidov, Mukhumat Vakhaev

=== Results ===
ACA 104
Weight Class				Method	Round	Time	Notes
Heavyweight 120 kg	(Russia) Mukhumat Vakhaev	def.	(Russia) Evgeniy Goncharov (c)	Submission (Guillotine Choke)	3	4:47	For the ACA Heavyweight Championship
Flyweight 57 kg	(Russia) Azamat Kerefov	def.	(Russia) Mansur Khatuev	Decision (Unanimous)	5	5:00	For the vacant ACA Flyweight Championship
Welterweight 77 kg	(Russia) Ali Bagov	def.	(United States) Adam Townsend	Decision (Unanimous)	3	5:00	
Bantamweight 61 kg	(Russia) Abdul-Rakhman Dudaev	def.	(Russia) Islam Meshev	Decision (Unanimous)	3	5:00	
Middleweight 84 kg	(Russia) Artem Frolov	def.	(Brazil) Bruno Santos	KO (Punch)	2	2:54	
Preliminary Card
Featherweight 66 kg	(Belarus) Apti Bimarzaev	def.	(Russia) Alexey Polpudnikov	Decision (Split)	3	5:00	
Featherweight 66 kg	(Russia) Magomedrasul Khasbulaev	def.	(Georgia (country)) Levan Makashvili	Decision (Unanimous)	3	5:00	
Flyweight 57 kg	(Russia) Murad Zeinulabidov	def.	(Russia) Rasul Albaskhanov	Submission (Arm-Triangle Choke)	2	2:53	
Lightweight 70 kg	(Russia) Mukhamed Kokov	def.	(Russia) Viskhan Magomadov	Submission (Rear-Naked Choke)	1	3:40	
Featherweight 66 kg	(Russia) Ramazan Kishev	def.	(Brazil) Otavio dos Santos	Submission (Rear-Naked Choke)	3	3:28	
Flyweight 57 kg	(Brazil) Maycon Silvan	def.	(Russia) Goga Shamatava	Submission (Guillotine Choke)	1	4:20	
Welterweight 77 kg	(Russia) Ustarmagomed Gadzhidaudov	def.	(Russia) Eldar Khashpakov	Decision (Unanimous)	3	5:00	
Featherweight 66 kg	(Russia) Bibert Tumenov	def.	(Guam) Kyle Reyes	TKO (Punches)	1	2:44	
Bantamweight 61 kg	(Brazil) Cleverson Silva	def.	(Russia) Valeriy Khazhirokov	Submission (Rear-Naked Choke)	2	2:39	

== ACA 105: Shakhbulatov vs. Oliveira ==
ACA 105: Shakhbulatov vs. Oliveira
- Promotion: Absolute Championship Akhmat
- Date: March 6, 2020
- Venue: Almaty Arena
- City: Almaty, Kazakhstan

Absolute Championship Akhmat 105: Shakhbulatov vs. Oliveira was a mixed martial arts event held by Absolute Championship Akhmat on March 6, 2020, at the Almaty Arena in Almaty, Kazakhstan.

=== Background ===
This event featured a title fight for the vacant ACA Bantamweight Championship between the Russian Shamil Shakhbulatov and the Brazilian Daniel Oliveira as headliner.

Bonus awards:

The following fighters were awarded $10,000 bonuses:

- Fight of the Night: Daniel Oliveira vs. Shamil Shakhbulatov
- Knockout of the Night: Asylzhan Bakhytzhanuly
- Submission of the Night: Artem Reznikov
- $5000 Stoppage Victory Bonuses: Abdul-Rahman Dzhanaev, Muslim Magomedov, Nursultan Kassymkhanov, Evgeniy Egemberdiev, Arman Ospanov

=== Results ===
ACA 105
Weight Class				Method	Round	Time	Notes
Bantamweight 61 kg	(Brazil) Daniel Oliveira	def.	(Russia) Shamil Shakhbulatov	Decision (Unanimous)	5	5:00	For the Vacant ACA Bantamweight Championship
Featherweight 66 kg	(Kazakhstan) Arman Ospanov	def.	(Russia) Rasul Mirzaev	TKO (Punches)	1	2:29	
Lightweight 70 kg	(Kazakhstan) Artem Reznikov	def.	(Russia) Khamzat Aushev	Submission (North–South Choke	1	2:41	
Light Heavyweight 93 kg	(Kazakhstan) Asylzhan Bakhytzhanuly	def.	(Spain) Jose Daniel Toledo	KO (Punches)	1	3:54	
Light Heavyweight 93 kg	(Kazakhstan) Evgeniy Egemberdiev	def.	(Poland) Karol Celinski	TKO (Punches)	1	2:24	
Preliminary Card
Featherweight 66 kg	(Kazakhstan) Nursultan Kassymkhanov	def.	(Belarus) Ivan Zhvirblia	KO (Punches)	1	1:39	
Featherweight 66 kg	(Russia) Alihan Suleimanov	def.	(Kazakhstan) Ermek Tlauov	TKO (Injury)	2	5:00	
Light Heavyweight 93 kg	(Russia) Muslim Magomedov	def.	(Brazil) Carlos Eduardo	TKO (Leg Injury)	3	0:48	
Bantamweight 61 kg	(Brazil) Walter Pereira	def.	(Kyrgyzstan) Kanat Keldibekov	Decision (Split)	3	5:00	
Light Heavyweight 93 kg	(Russia) Nasrudin Nasrudinov	def.	(United States) Cory Hendricks	Decision (Unanimous)	3	5:00	
Flyweight 57 kg	(Russia) Imran Bukuev	def.	(Brazil) Felipe Silva	Decision (Unanimous)	3	5:00	
Middleweight 84 kg	(Russia) Abdul-Rahman Dzhanaev	def.	(Dominican Republic) Alex Garcia	TKO (Punches)	2	0:44	
Lightweight 70 kg	(Russia) Imanali Gamzathanov	def.	(Brazil) Raimundo Batista	Decision (Unanimous)	3	5:00	
Lightweight 70 kg	(Russia) Egor Golubtsov	def.	(Russia) Yusup Umarov	TKO (Doctor Stoppage)	2	5:00	
Lightweight 70 kg	(Russia) Kazim Tumenov	def.	(Kyrgyzstan) Rustambek Amanbaev	Decision (Unanimous)	3	5:00	
Flyweight 57 kg	(Russia) Murad Magomedov	def.	(Brazil) Josiel Silva	Decision (Unanimous)	3	5:00	

== ACA 106: Frolov vs. Magomedov ==
ACA 106: Frolov vs. Magomedov
- Promotion: Absolute Championship Akhmat
- Date: July 11, 2020
- Venue: Sibur Arena
- City: Saint Petersburg, Russia

Absolute Championship Akhmat 106: Frolov vs. Magomedov was a mixed martial arts event held by Absolute Championship Akhmat. The event was initially scheduled to be held on March 24, 2020, at the Sibur Arena in Saint Petersburg, Russia, but it was postponed to July 11, 2020, due to the coronavirus outbreak.

=== Background ===
This event was headlined by former M-1 Middleweight Champion Artem Frolov and Ibragim Magomedov.

A welterweight bout between Magomedsaygid Alibekov and Georgiy Kichigin was scheduled for the co-main event of the evening. However, Kichigin was pulled from the event after testing positive for COVID-19. The welterweight bout between Andrey Koshkin and Mark Hulme was also scheduled for the main card, but Hulme was unable to compete due to visa issues. Alibekov and Koshkin faced each other in the co main event.

Bonus awards:

The following fighters were awarded $10,000 bonuses:

- Fight of the Night: Bibert Tumenov vs. Alexander Matmuratov
- Knockout of the Night: Bekhruz Zukhurov
- Submission of the Night: Egor Golubtsov
- $5000 Stoppage Victory Bonuses: Alexey Efremov

=== Results ===
ACA 106
Weight Class				Method	Round	Time	Notes
Middleweight 84 kg	(Russia) Artem Frolov	def.	(Russia) Ibragim Magomedov	Decision (Unanimous)	3	5:00	
Welterweight 77 kg	(Russia) Andrei Koshkin	def.	(Russia) Magomedsaygid Alibekov	Decision (Unanimous)	3	5:00	
Middleweight 84 kg	(Russia) Arbi Agujev	def.	(Russia) Evgeny Belyaev	Decision (Unanimous)	3	5:00	
Middleweight 84 kg	(Russia) Alexey Efremov	def.	(Russia) Vycheslav Babkin	TKO (Knee Injury)	2	0:42	
Featherweight 66 kg	(Russia) Alexander Matmuratov	def.	(Russia) Bibert Tumenov	Decision (Unanimous)	3	5:00	
Preliminary Card
Middleweight 84 kg	(Russia) Baysangur Vakhitov	def.	(Russia) Vitaly Nemchinov	Decision (Unanimous)	3	5:00	
Featherweight 66 kg	(Tajikistan) Bekhruz Zukhurov	def.	(Belarus) Ivan Zhvirblia	KO (Punches)	2	4:03	
Lightweight 70 kg	(Russia) Egor Golubtsov	def.	(Russia) Roman Avdal	Submission (Arm-Triangle Choke)	2	3:40	
Light Heavyweight 93 kg	(Russia) Grigor Matevosyan	def.	(Russia) Vasily Babich	Decision (Unanimous)	3	5:00	
Welterweight 77 kg	(Russia) Eldar Khashpakov	def.	(Russia) Alexander Chernov	Decision (Unanimous)	3	5:00	

== ACA 107: Emelianenko vs. Ismailov ==
ACA 107: Emelianenko vs. Ismailov
- Promotion: Absolute Championship Akhmat
- Date: July 24, 2020
- City: Sochi, Russia

Absolute Championship Akhmat 107: Emelianenko vs. Ismailov was a mixed martial arts event held by Absolute Championship Akhmat on July 24, 2020, in Sochi, Russia.

=== Background ===
The event was initially planned to be held on April 7, 2020, at the VTB Arena in Moscow, Russia, but was postponed to July 24 due to the coronavirus outbreak.

Kurban Taigibov was set to fight against Ramazan Kishev, but Kishev had to withdraw due to an injury. As a result of this, promotion officials rescheduled the bout for ACA 110 event September 5, 2020.

Alexey Shaposhnikov and Sheikh-Mansur Khabibulaev dropped out of the card due to injury. Their rivals Aren Hakobyan and Ruslan Abiltarov faced each other on the prelims card.

Bonus awards:

The following fighters were awarded $10,000 bonuses:

- Fight of the Night: Nasrudin Nasrudinov vs. Evgeniy Egemberdiev
- Submission of the Night: Khaseyn Shaikhaev
- $5000 Stoppage Victory Bonuses: Aren Akopyan, Magomed Bibulatov, Magomed Ismailov

=== Results ===
ACA 107
Weight Class				Method	Round	Time	Notes
Heavyweight 120 kg	(Russia) Magomed Ismailov	def.	(Russia) Alexander Emelianenko	TKO (Punches)	3	3:25	
Welterweight 77 kg	(Russia) Abubakar Vagaev	def.	(Russia) Gadzhimurad Khiramagomedov	Decision (Unanimous)	3	5:00	
Bantamweight 61 kg	(Russia) Magomed Bibulatov	def.	(Russia) Nikita Chistyakov	TKO (Punches)	1	3:36	
Light Heavyweight 93 kg	(Russia) Nasrudin Nasrudinov	def.	(Kazakhstan) Evgeniy Egemberdiev	TKO (Cut)	3	3:44	
Bantamweight 61 kg	(Russia) Nashkho Galaev	def.	(Russia) Oleg Borisov	Decision (Unanimous)	3	5:00	
Preliminary Card
Welterweight 77 kg	(Russia) Vitaliy Slipenko	def.	(Russia) Chersi Dudaev	Decision (Unanimous)	3	5:00	
Featherweight 66 kg	(Russia) Andrey Goncharov	def.	(Ukraine) Roman Ogulchanskiy	Decision (Unanimous)	3	5:00	
Bantamweight 61 kg	(Russia) Khuseyn Shaikhaev	def.	(Russia) Akhmed Musakaev	Decision (Unanimous)	3	5:00	
Flyweight 57 kg	(Russia) Aren Akopyan	def.	(Ukraine) Ruslan Abiltarov	Submission (Rear-Naked Choke)	2	3:49	
Bantamweight 61 kg	(Russia) Khaseyn Shaikhaev	def.	(Russia) Aslan Shogov	Submission (Guillotine Choke)	1	0:32	

== ACA 108: Galiev vs. Adaev ==
ACA 108: Galiev vs. Adaev
- Promotion: Absolute Championship Akhmat
- Date: August 8, 2020
- City: Grozny, Russia

Absolute Championship Akhmat 108: Galiev vs. Adaev was a mixed martial arts event held by Absolute Championship Akhmat. The event was initially scheduled to be held on April 24, 2020, at the Arena COS Torwar in Warsaw, Poland, but due to the coronavirus outbreak it was postponed to August 8, 2020, in Russia.

=== Background ===
Bonus awards:

The following fighters will be awarded $10,000 bonuses:

- Fight of the Night: Amirkhan Adaev vs. Vener Galiev
- Knockout of the Night: Alexander Butenko
- Submission of the Night: Bayzet Khatkhokhu
- $5000 Stoppage Victory Bonuses: Artur Astakhov, Alikhan Vakhaev

=== Results ===
ACA 108
Weight Class				Method	Round	Time	Notes
Lightweight 70 kg	(Russia) Amirkhan Adaev	def.	(Russia) Vener Galiev	Decision (Unanimous)	3	5:00	
Heavyweight 120 kg	(Russia) Alikhan Vakhaev	def.	(Estonia) Denis Smoldarev	TKO (Elbows)	1	3:02	
Middleweight 85 kg	(Russia) Magomedrasul Gasanov	def.	(Russia) Husein Kushagov	Decision (Unanimous)	3	5:00	
Lightweight 70 kg	(Russia) Islam Omarov	def.	(Russia) Abdul-Rakhman Temirov	Decision (Unanimous)	3	5:00	
Preliminary Card
Welterweight 77 kg	(Ukraine) Alexander Butenko	def.	(Russia) Rasul Shovhalov	TKO (Punches)	1	2:57	
Bantamweight 61 kg	(Russia) Murad Kalamov	def.	(Russia) Maharbek Karginov	Decision (Unanimous)	3	5:00	
Light Heavyweight 93 kg	(Russia) Artur Astakhov	def.	(Russia) Magomed Sheikhov	TKO (Punches)	2	3:55	
Lightweight 70 kg	(Russia) Bayzet Khatkhokhu	def.	(Russia) Adam Aliev	Submission (Armbar)	3	2:32	

== ACA 109: Strus vs. Haratyk ==
ACA 109: Strus vs. Haratyk
- Promotion: Absolute Championship Akhmat
- Date: August 20, 2020
- City: Łódź, Poland

Absolute Championship Akhmat 109: Strus vs. Haratyk was a mixed martial arts event held by Absolute Championship Akhmat on August 20, 2020, in Poland.

=== Background ===
Bonus awards:

The following fighters will be awarded $10,000 bonuses:

- Fight of the Night: Karol Celiński vs. Luke Barnatt
- Knockout of the Night: Lom-Ali Eskijew
- $5000 Stoppage Victory Bonuses: Levan Makashvili, Dmitry Poberezhets, Nikola Dipchikov, Rafał Haratyk

=== Results ===
ACA 109
Weight Class				Method	Round	Time	Notes
Middleweight 84 kg	(Poland) Rafał Haratyk	def.	(Poland) Piotr Strus	TKO (Referee Stoppage)	1	2:29	
Heavyweight 120 kg	(Poland) Daniel Omielańczuk	def.	(Lithuania) Tomas Pakutinskas	TKO (Injury)	1	5:00	
Middleweight 93 kg	(Bulgaria) Nikola Dipchikov	def.	(Croatia) Goran Reljić	TKO (Punches)	1	2:38	
Light Heavyweight 120 kg	(Poland) Karol Celiński	def.	(England) Luke Barnatt	Decision (Unanimous)	3	5:00	
Preliminary Card
Welterweight 77 kg	(Romania) Aurel Pîrtea	def.	(Poland) Łukasz Kopera	Decision (Unanimous)	3	5:00	
Featherweight 66 kg	(Germany) Lom-Ali Eskijew	def.	(Germany) Omer Cankardesler	KO (Punches)	1	4:05	
Heavyweight 120 kg	(Lithuania) Mindaugas Veržbickas	def.	(Poland) Kamil Oniszczuk	Decision (Unanimous)	3	5:00	
Heavyweight 120 kg	(Ukraine) Dmitry Poberezhets	def.	(Poland) Adam Pałasz	TKO (Punches)	1	4:32	
Lightweight 70 kg	(Georgia (country)) Levan Makashvili	def.	(Czech Republic) Roman Dik	KO (Punches)	2	4:38	
Lightweight 70 kg	(Czech Republic) Vitezslav Rajnoch	def.	(Austria) Christian Draxler	Decision (Split)	3	5:00	

== ACA 110: Bagov vs. Abdulaev ==
ACA 110: Bagov vs. Abdulaev
- Promotion: Absolute Championship Akhmat
- Date: September 5, 2020
- Venue: Krylatskoye Sports Palace
- City: Moscow, Russia

Absolute Championship Akhmat 110: Bagov vs. Abdulaev was a mixed martial arts event held by Absolute Championship Akhmat on September 5, 2020, at the Krylatskoye Sports Palace in Moscow, Russia.

=== Background ===
Bonus awards:

The following fighters will be awarded $10,000 bonuses:

- Fight of the Night: Islam Meshev vs. Emran Israfilov
- Knockout of the Night: Askhab Zulaev
- Submission of the Night: Samvel Vardanyan

=== Results ===
ACA 110
Weight Class				Method	Round	Time	Notes
Welterweight 77 kg	(Russia) Murad Abdulaev	def.	(Russia) Ali Bagov	Decision (Unanimous)	5	5:00	For the ACA Welterweight Championship
Lightweight 70 kg	(Russia) Eduard Vartanyan	def.	(Russia) Mukhamed Kokov	Decision (Split)	3	5:00	
Featherweight 66 kg	(Russia) Ramazan Kishev	def.	(Russia) Kurban Taigibov	TKO (Punches)	1	4:31	
Featherweight 66 kg	(Russia) Askhab Zulaev	def.	(Kyrgyzstan) Zharabek Teshebaev	KO (Punch)	3	0:21	
Lightheavyweight 93 kg	(Russia) Ilya Shcheglov	def.	(Russia) Adlan Ibragimov	Decision (Unanimous)	3	5:00	
Preliminary Card
Lightweight 70 kg	(Russia) Daud Shaikhaev	def.	(Kyrgyzstan) Erlan Ulukbekov	TKO (Punches)	2	1:32	
Featherweight 66 kg	(Russia) Islam Meshev	def.	(Russia) Emran Israfilov	Decision (Unanimous)	3	5:00	
Middleweight 84 kg	(Russia) Azamat Bekoev	def.	(Russia) Araz Mamedov	TKO (pucnhes)	1	3:01	
Heavyweight 120 kg	(Russia) Elkhan Musaev	def.	(Russia) Adam Bogatirov	Decision (Unanimous)	3	5:00	
Flyweight 57 kg	(Russia) Murad Magomedov	def.	(Russia) Goga Shamatava	Decision (Unanimous)	3	5:00	
Lightweight 70 kg	(Ukraine) Samvel Vardanyan	def.	(Russia) Khamzat Aushev	Submission (Keylock)	2	2:25	
Bantamweight 61 kg	(Ukraine) Pavel Vitruk	def.	(Russia) Valeriy Khazhirokov	Decision (Unanimous)	3	5:00	
Featherweight 66 kg	(Russia) Makhochi Sagitov	def.	(Russia) Roman Podrugin	Decision (Unanimous)	3	5:00	

== ACA 111: Abdulvakhabov vs. Sarnavskiy ==
ACA 111: Abdulvakhabov vs. Sarnavskiy
- Promotion: Absolute Championship Akhmat
- Date: September 19, 2020
- Venue: Krylatskoye Sports Palace
- City: Moscow, Russia

Absolute Championship Akhmat 111: Abdulvakhabov vs. Sarnavskiy was a mixed martial arts event held by Absolute Championship Akhmat on September 19, 2020, at the Krylatskoye Sports Palace in Moscow, Russia.

=== Background ===
Bonus awards:

The following fighters were awarded $10,000 bonuses:

- Fight of the Night: Azam Gaforov vs. Mansur Khatuev
- Knockout of the Night: Lom-Ali Nalgiev
- $5000 Stoppage Victory Bonuses: Aleksei Butorin, Tural Ragimov, Azamat Amagov, Oleg Olenyechev, Murat Gugov

=== Results ===
ACA 111
Weight Class				Method	Round	Time	Notes
Lightweight 70 kg	(Russia) Abdul-Aziz Abdulvakhabov	def.	(Russia) Alexander Sarnavskiy	Decision (Unanimous)	5	5:00	For the ACA Lightweight Championship
Lightweight 70 kg	(Kazakhstan) Artem Reznikov	def.	(Russia) Yusuf Raisov	Decision (Unanimous)	3	5:00	
Light Heavyweight 93 kg	(Russia) Aleksei Butorin	def.	(Kazakhstan) Asylzhan Bakhytzhanuly	KO (Punch)	3	0:27	
Featherweight 66 kg	(Azerbaijan) Tural Ragimov	def.	(Tajikistan) Bekhruz Zukhurov	TKO (Elbows)	3	1:23	
Welterweight 77 kg	(Russia) Azamat Amagov	def.	(Russia) Arseniy Sultanov	KO (Punches)	1	1:07	
Flyweight 57 kg	(Tajikistan) Azam Gaforov	def.	(Russia) Mansur Khatuev	Decision (Unanimous)	3	5:00	
Lightweight 70 kg	(Russia) Lom-Ali Nalgiev	def.	(Russia) Imanali Gamzathanov	KO (Heel Kick)	1	3:42	
Welterweight 77 kg	(Kazakhstan) Georgy Kichigin	def.	(Tajikistan) Mamurzhon Hamdamov	Decision (Unanimous)	3	5:00	
Preliminary Card
Lightweight 70 kg	(Russia) Ayndi Umakhanov	def.	(Russia) Murat Tlyarukov	Decision (Unanimous)	3	5:00	
Bantamweight 61 kg	(Kazakhstan) Nurbergen Sharipov	def.	(Russia) Tamerlan Kulaev	Decision (Unanimous)	3	5:00	
Lightweight 70 kg	(France) Mehdi Dakaev	def.	(Russia) Mikhail Balakirev	Decision (Unanimous)	3	5:00	
Light Heavyweight 93 kg	(Russia) Oleg Olenyechev	def.	(Russia) Roman Gudochkin	Submission (Rear-Naked Choke)	1	4:44	
Lightweight 70 kg	(Russia) Abubakar Mestoev	def.	(Russia) Arthur Soloviev	Decision (Unanimous)	3	5:00	
Light Heavyweight 93 kg	(Russia) Murat Gugov	def.	(Russia) Alexey Sidorenko	Submission (Armbar)	1	1:12	

== ACA 112: Oliveira vs. Dudaev ==
ACA 112: Oliveira vs. Dudaev
- Promotion: Absolute Championship Akhmat
- Date: October 4, 2020
- Venue: Sports Hall Coliseum
- City: Grozny, Russia

Absolute Championship Akhmat 112: Oliveira vs. Dudaev was a mixed martial arts event held by Absolute Championship Akhmat on October 4, 2020, at the Sports Hall Coliseum in Grozny, Russia.

=== Background ===
Bonus awards:

The following fighters were awarded $10,000 bonuses:

- Fight of the Night: Beslan Ushukov vs. Ustarmagomed Gadzhidaudov
- Knockout of the Night: Magomed Bibulatov
- $5000 Stoppage Victory Bonuses: Daniel Oliveira, Stanislav Vlasenko, Azamat Pshukov, Rasul Albaskhanov

=== Results ===
ACA 112
Weight Class				Method	Round	Time	Notes
Bantamweight 61 kg	(Brazil) Daniel Oliveira (c)	def.	(Russia) Abdul-Rakhman Dudaev	KO (Knee to the Body)	3	3:33	For the ACA Bantamweight Championship
Middleweight 84 kg	(Russia) Abubakar Vagaev	def.	(Switzerland) Yasubey Enomoto	Decision (Unanimous)	3	5:00	
Bantamweight 61 kg	(Russia) Magomed Bibulatov	def.	(Brazil) Rodrigo Praia	KO (Spinning Heel Kick)	1	1:11	
Featherweight 66 kg	(Russia) Salman Zhamaldaev	def.	(Russia) Alexey Polpudnikov	Decision (Unanimous)	3	5:00	
Welterweight 77 kg	(Russia) Ustarmagomed Gadzhidaudov	def.	(Russia) Beslan Ushukov	Decision (Unanimous)	3	5:00	
Preliminary Card
Featherweight 66 kg	(Russia) Dzhihad Yunosov	def.	(Brazil) Diego Brandao	Decision (Unanimous)	3	5:00	
Middleweight 84 kg	(Russia) Stanislav Vlasenko	def.	(Russia) Arbi Agujev	TKO (Punches)	1	0:36	
Flyweight 57 kg	(Russia) Azamat Pshukov	def.	(Russia) Imran Bukuev	Submission (Rear-Naked Choke)	2	2:18	
Flyweight 57 kg	(Russia) Rasul Albaskhanov	def.	(Russia) Alexey Shaposhnikov	KO (Punches)	1	1:10	
Lightweight 70 kg	(Russia) Viskhan Magomadov	def.	(Russia) Egor Golubstov	Decision (Unanimous)	3	5:00	

== ACA 113: Kerefov vs. Gadzhiev ==
ACA 113: Kerefov vs. Gadzhiev
- Promotion: Absolute Championship Akhmat
- Date: November 6, 2020
- Venue: VTB Arena
- City: Moscow, Russia

Absolute Championship Akhmat 113: Kerefov vs. Gadzhiev was a mixed martial arts event held by Absolute Championship Akhmat on November 6, 2020, at the VTB Arena in Moscow, Russia.

=== Background ===
The main event of the evening was supposed to feature a title bout between the ACA Featherweight Champion Felipe Froes and the challenger Magomedrasul Khasbulaev, but it was reported that Khasbulaev has been forced out of the bout due to a leg injury. As a result, the fight was canceled.

Bonus awards:

The following fighters will be awarded $10,000 bonuses:

- Fight of the Night: Azamat Kerefov vs. Kurban Gadzhiev
- Knockout of the Night: Shamil Shakhbulatov
- Submission of the Night: Bayzet Khatkhokhu
- $5000 Stoppage Victory Bonuses: Ruslan Abiltarov, Cristian Brinzan, Alexey Efremov, Oleg Borisov

=== Results ===
ACA 113
Weight Class				Method	Round	Time	Notes
Flyweight 57 kg	(Russia) Azamat Kerefov (c)	def.	(Russia) Kurban Gadzhiev	Decision (Unanimous)	5	5:00	For the ACA Flyweight Championship
Bantamweight 61 kg	(Russia) Shamil Shakhbulatov	def.	(Brazil) Walter Pereira Jr.	TKO (Punches)	1	3:54	
Lightweight 70 kg	(Russia) Rashid Magomedov	def.	(Belarus) Artiom Damkovsky	Decision (Unanimous)	3	5:00	
Welterweight 77 kg	(Russia) Gadzhimurad Khiramagomedov	def.	(Brazil) Elias Silvério	Decision (Unanimous)	3	5:00	
Preliminary Card
Bantamweight 61 kg	(Russia) Oleg Borisov	def.	(Brazil) Cleverson Silva	KO (Punches)	1	1:36	
Middleweight 84 kg	(Russia) Abdul-Rahman Dzhanaev	def.	(Georgia (country)) Nodar Kudukhashvili	Decision (Unanimous)	3	5:00	
Flyweight 57 kg	(Russia) Murad Zeinulabidov	def.	(Brazil) Maycon Silvan	Decision (Unanimous)	3	5:00	
Middleweight 84 kg	(Russia) Alexey Efremov	def.	(Ukraine) Vadim Shabadash	Submission (Guillotine Choke)	1	2:41	
Welterweight 77 kg	(Italy) Cristian Brinzan	def.	(Russia) Rasul Shovhalov	TKO (Knee and Punches)	2	0:42	
Featherweight 66 kg	(Russia) Alexander Matmuratov	def.	(Kyrgyzstan) Kanat Keldibekov	TKO (Doctor Stoppage)	1	5:00	
Lightweight 70 kg	(Russia) Bayzet Khatkhokhu	def.	(Russia) Ivan Soloviev	Submission (Rear-Naked Choke)	2	2:42	
Featherweight 66 kg	(Russia) Islam Omarov	def.	(Russia) Zamir Aripshev	Decision (Unanimous)	3	5:00	
Flyweight 57 kg	(Ukraine) Ruslan Abiltarov	def.	(Kyrgyzstan) Farrukh Adzhiev	Submission (Triangle Choke)	1	4:34	

== ACA 114: Omielańczuk vs. Johnson ==
ACA 114: Omielańczuk vs. Johnson
- Promotion: Absolute Championship Akhmat
- Date: November 26, 2020
- Venue: DoubleTree by Hilton Hotel Lodz
- City: Łódź, Poland

Absolute Championship Akhmat 114: Omielańczuk vs. Johnson was a mixed martial arts event held by Absolute Championship Akhmat on November 26, 2020, at the DoubleTree by Hilton Hotel Lodz in Łódź, Poland.

=== Background ===
Vazha Tsiptauri was set to fight with Tomáš Deák but he has to withdraw a week before the fight when he tested positive for COVID-19. The Finns Mikael Silander replaces Tsiptauri, takes short notice fight against Deák.

Bonus awards:

The following fighters will be awarded $10,000 bonuses:

- Knockout of the Night: Kamil Oniszczuk
- $5000 Stoppage Victory Bonuses: Mikael Silander, Adam Pałasz, Raul Tutarauli, Daniel James, Nikola Dipchikov, Tony Johnson Jr.

=== Results ===
ACA 114
Weight Class				Method	Round	Time	Notes
Heavyweight 120 kg	(United States) Tony Johnson Jr.	def.	(Poland) Daniel Omielańczuk	KO (Punches)	1	1:09	For the vacant ACA Heavyweight Championship
Middleweight 84 kg	(Bulgaria) Nikola Dipchikov	def.	(Poland) Rafał Haratyk	KO (Punches)	1	3:44	
Lightweight 70 kg	(Romania) Aurel Pîrtea	def.	(Georgia (country)) Levan Makashvili	Decision (Split)	3	5:00	
Featherweight 66 kg	(Brazil) Leonardo Limberger	def.	(Ukraine) Dmitriy Parubchenko	Decision (Unanimous)	3	5:00	
Catchweight 85.5 kg	(Poland) Bartosz Leśko	def.	(Brazil) Rene Pessoa	Decision (Unanimous)	3	5:00	
Preliminary Card
Heavyweight 120 kg	(United States) Daniel James	def.	(Czech Republic) Michal Martínek	TKO (Punches)	2	3:32	
Featherweight 66 kg	(Germany) Atilla Korkmaz	def.	(Poland) Jakub Kowalewicz	Decision (Unanimous)	3	5:00	
Welterweight 77 kg	(Poland) Łukasz Kopera	def.	(Austria) Michael Rirsch	Decision (Unanimous)	3	5:00	
Lightweight 70 kg	(Georgia (country)) Raul Tutarauli	def.	(Bosnia and Herzegovina) Dragoljub Stanojević	KO (Knee and Punches)	1	0:14	
Welterweight 77 kg	(Poland) Kamil Oniszczuk	def.	(Poland) Krystian Bielski	KO (Head Kick)	3	1:52	
Heavyweight 120 kg	(Poland) Adam Pałasz	def.	(Latvia) Olegs Jemeljanovs	TKO (Leg Kicks and Punches)	2	1:54	
Light Heavyweight 93 kg	(United States) Cory Hendricks	def.	(Brazil) Carlos Eduardo	Decision (Unanimous)	3	5:00	
Bantamweight 61 kg	(Finland) Mikael Silander	def.	(Slovakia) Tomáš Deák	Submission (Guillotine Choke)	1	2:41	

== ACA 115: Ismailov vs. Shtyrkov ==
ACA 115: Ismailov vs. Shtyrkov
- Promotion: Absolute Championship Akhmat
- Date: December 12, 2020
- Venue: VTB Arena
- City: Moscow, Russia

Absolute Championship Akhmat 115: Ismailov vs. Shtyrkov was a mixed martial arts event held by Absolute Championship Akhmat on December 12, 2020, at the VTB Arena in Moscow, Russia.

=== Background ===
Bonus awards:

The following fighters will be awarded $10,000 bonuses:

- Fight of the Night: Dmitry Poberezhets vs. Ruslan Magomedov
- Knockout of the Night: Evgeniy Egemberdiev
- Submission of the Night: Alihan Suleimanov
- $5000 Stoppage Victory Bonuses: Aren Akopyan, Bibert Tumenov, Andrey Goncharov

=== Results ===
ACA 115
Weight Class				Method	Round	Time	Notes
Light Heavyweight 93 kg	(Russia) Magomed Ismailov	def.	(Russia) Ivan Shtyrkov	Decision (Unanimous)	3	5:00	
Middleweight 84 kg	(Russia) Magomedrasul Gasanov	def.	(Russia) Artem Frolov	Decision (Unanimous)	3	5:00	
Lightweight 70 kg	(Russia) Yusuf Raisov	def.	(Russia) Egor Golubtsov	Decision (Unanimous)	3	5:00	
Featherweight 66 kg	(Russia) Andrey Goncharov	def.	(Russia) Adlan Bataev	KO (Punch)	2	0:56	
Light Heavyweight 93 kg	(Russia) Muslim Magomedov	def.	(Russia) Murat Gugov	Decision (Split)	3	5:00	
Preliminary Card
Featherweight 66 kg	(Russia) Alihan Suleimanov	def.	(Kazakhstan) Nursultan Kassymkhanov	Submission (Rear-Naked Choke)	2	2:49	
Lightweight 70 kg	(Russia) Mukhamed Kokov	def.	(Brazil) Herdeson Batista	Decision (Unanimous)	3	5:00	
Light Heavyweight 93 kg	(Kazakhstan) Evgeniy Egemberdiev	def.	(England) Luke Barnatt	KO (Punch)	1	3:46	
Heavyweight 120 kg	(Ukraine) Dmitry Poberezhets	def.	(Russia) Ruslan Magomedov	KO (Punches)	3	0:30	
Featherweight 66 kg	(Russia) Bibert Tumenov	def.	(Russia) Alexey Polpudnikov	TKO (Punches)	1	2:49	
Heavyweight 120 kg	(Estonia) Denis Smoldarev	def.	(Russia) Elkhan Musaev	Decision (Unanimous)	3	5:00	
Bantamweight 61 kg	(Brazil) Francisco de Lima	def.	(Russia) Magomed Gadzhiev	Decision (Unanimous)	3	5:00	
Welterweight 77 kg	(Russia) Magomedsaygid Alibekov	def.	(Brazil) Claudio Cezario	Decision (Unanimous)	3	5:00	
Flyweight 57 kg	(Russia) Aren Akopyan	def.	(Brazil) Alan Gomes	Submission (Rear-Naked Choke)	2	2:54	
Lightweight 70 kg	(Russia) Mikhail Balakirev	def.	(Uzbekistan) Akhliddin Mirzadavlatov	DQ (Illegal Kick)	2	3:38	

== ACA 116: Froes vs Balaev ==
ACA 116: Froes vs Balaev
- Promotion: Absolute Championship Akhmat
- Date: December 18, 2020
- Venue: VTB Arena
- City: Moscow, Russia

Absolute Championship Akhmat 116: Froes vs Balaev was a mixed martial arts event held by Absolute Championship Akhmat on December 18, 2020, at the VTB Arena in Moscow, Russia.

=== Background ===
ACA featherweight world champion Felipe Froes missed weight ahead of his fight against Marat Balaev and will not be eligible to retain the belt even if he wins. Felipe Froes was 0.7 kilograms over the limit. The fight will proceed with only Balaev, who weighed-in at 66 kg is eligible to win the title with a victory. If Froes wins the fight, the title will become vacant.

Brett Cooper was scheduled to face Beslan Isaev in a welterweight bout. However, after making weight, he consulted with his lawyers and decided to refuse fighting because of the U.S. Department of Treasury and Great Britain's sanctions policy against Kadyrov and any organization owned by him, this including Absolute Championship Akhmat. Under these sanctions, it is illegal for any US citizen to do business with any of these entities, meaning that all American fighters could face fines or jail time if they fight for the organization.

Bonus awards:

The following fighters will be awarded $10,000 bonuses:

- Fight of the Night: Ibragim Magomedov vs. Azamat Bekoev
- Knockout of the Night: Roman Ogulchanskiy
- Submission of the Night: Chersi Dudaev
- $5000 Stoppage Victory Bonuses: Akhmed Musakaev, Mark Hulme, Grigor Matevosyan, Khuseyn Shaykhaev, Vener Galiev, Felipe Froes

=== Results ===
ACA 116
Weight Class				Method	Round	Time	Notes
Featherweight 66 kg	(Brazil) Felipe Froes	def.	(Russia) Marat Balaev	TKO (Punches and Knees)	3	1:19	For the ACA Featherweight Championship
Welterweight 77 kg	(Russia) Khusein Khaliev	def.	(Kazakhstan) Igor Svirid	Decision (Unanimous)	3	5:00	
Heavyweight 120 kg	(Russia) Salimgerey Rasulov	def.	(Russia) Adam Bogatyrev	Decision (Unanimous)	3	5:00	
Welterweight 77 kg	(Ukraine) Vitaly Slipenko	def.	(Kyrgyzstan) Altynbek Mamashev	Decision (Unanimous)	3	5:00	
Lightweight 70 kg	(Russia) Vener Galiev	def.	(Russia) Adam Aliev	TKO (Punches)	2	3:47	
Preliminary Card
Bantamweight 61 kg	(Russia) Khaseyn Shaykhaev	def.	(Brazil) Dileno Lopes	Decision (Split)	3	5:00	
Middleweight 84 kg	(Russia) Chersi Dudaev	def.	(Russia) Stanislav Vlasenko	Submission (Rear-Naked Choke)	2	3:47	
Middleweight 84 kg	(Russia) Ibragim Magomedov	def.	(Russia) Azamat Bekoev	Decision (Unanimous)	3	5:00	
Bantamweight 61 kg	(Russia) Khuseyn Shaykhaev	def.	(Brazil) José Vagno	Submission (Rear-Naked Choke)	2	2:32	
Light Heavyweight 93 kg	(Armenia) Grigor Matevosyan	def.	(Ukraine) Dmitriy Mikutsa	Submission (Rear-Naked Choke)	1	3:57	
Bantamweight 61 kg	(Ukraine) Roman Ogulchanskiy	def.	(Tajikistan) Abdusamad Sangov	TKO (Head Kick and Punches)	1	3:14	
Welterweight 77 kg	(South Africa) Mark Hulme	def.	(Russia) Murat Tlyarukov	Submission (Guillotine Choke)	1	1:31	
Flyweight 57 kg	(Brazil) Josiel Silva	def.	(Russia) Goga Shamatava	Decision (Unanimous)	3	5:00	
Bantamweight 61 kg	(Russia) Akhmed Musakaev	def.	(Brazil) Sergio Ribeiro	Submission (Arm-Triangle Choke)	2	2:50	
Lightweight 70 kg	(Russia) Nikita Gomzyakov	def.	(Afghanistan) Baz Mohammad	Decision (Split)	3	5:00	

== See also ==
- 2020 in UFC
- 2020 in Bellator MMA
- 2020 in ONE Championship
- 2020 in Rizin Fighting Federation
- 2020 in Konfrontacja Sztuk Walki
- 2020 in RXF
