= Piotr Kuberski =

Polish mixed martial artist (born 1988)

- Born: Piotr Kuberski; October 24, 1988 (age 37); Oborniki, Poland
- Other names: Qbear
- Height: 6 ft 3 in (1.91 m)
- Weight: 185 lb (84 kg; 13 st 3 lb)
- Division: Middleweight (2012, 2018–present)
- Reach: 74.8 in (190 cm)
- Fighting out of: Poznań, Poland
- Team: Ankos MMA Poznań
- Years active: 2012, 2018–present

Professional boxing record
- Total: 1
- Wins: 1
- By knockout: 0
- Losses: 0

Mixed martial arts record
- Total: 19
- Wins: 18
- By knockout: 16
- By submission: 0
- By decision: 2
- Losses: 1
- By submission: 1

Other information
- Boxing record from BoxRec
- Mixed martial arts record from Sherdog

Piotr Kuberski (born October 24, 1988) is a Polish professional mixed martial artist. He is the current interim KSW Middleweight Champion. He is a former FEN Middleweight Champion.

== Professional career ==
=== Early career ===
Kuberski made his professional debut on November 17, 2012, against Piotr Judek. Kuberski won the fight via a first-round TKO.

=== Return to fighting ===
Kuberski returned to fighting after a six-year hiatus. His return came on April 13, 2018, under Slugfest MMA against Nikolay Moskalets. Kuberski won the fight via a first-round TKO.

=== Slugfest MMA ===
After accumulating a career record of 3–1, Kuberski returned to Slugfest MMA on May 24, 2019, against Adam Ugorski. Kuberski won the fight via a second-round TKO.

His last fight came on November 15, 2019, against Alexandr Gluschenko. Kuberski won the fight via a second-round TKO.

=== UAE Warriors ===
He made his debut under UAE Warriors on January 31, 2020, against Ahmed Saeb. Kuberski won the fight via a Unanimous Decision.

=== Rocky Warriors Cartel ===
Kuberski returned to Poland, where he fought under local federation Rocky Warriors Cartel on July 31, 2020, against Markus Cuk. Kuberski won the fight via a first-round knockout.

=== Fight Exclusive Night ===
He made his debut under Fight Exclusive Night on February 20, 2021, against Mateusz Strzelczyk. Kuberski won the fight via a second-round TKO.

His next fight came on November 27, 2021, against Krystian Bielski. Kuberski won the fight via a Unanimous Decision. This fight earned him his first Fight of the Night bonus.

==== FEN Middleweight Champion ====
It was announced that Kuberski would face Marcin Naruszczka for the vacant FEN Middleweight Championship on June 18, 2022. Kuberski won the fight via a first-round knockout, winning his first career championship in the process.

His first title defense came on January 28, 2023, against Marcin Filipczak. Kuberski won the fight via a second-round knockout, defending his championship in the process. Along with defending his championship, Kuberski earned his first Knockout of the Night bonus.

His second title defense came on May 27, 2023, against Kamil Wojciechowski. Kuberski won the fight via a first-round knockout, once again defending his championship. Following the performance, Kuberski earned his second career Knockout of the Night bonus.

On September 25, 2023, it was announced that Kuberski has fulfilled his contract, and will not be renewing it, vacating his championship in the process.

=== Dana White's Contender Series ===
In July 2023, it was announced that Kuberski would be competing in Dana White's Contender Series on an undetermined date against Marco Tulio. Kuberski later withdrew before the fight was ever officially announced due to an ongoing hip injury.

=== Konfrontacja Sztuk Walki ===
Kuberski made his debut under Konfrontacja Sztuk Walki on November 11, 2023, against Bartosz Leśko. Kuberski won the fight via a third-round knockout.

His next fight came on March 16, 2024, against Michał Materla. Kuberski won the fight via a first-round TKO.

His next fight came on November 16, 2024, against Damian Janikowski. Kuberski won the fight via a second-round TKO. This fight earned him his second career Fight of the Night bonus.

==== Interim KSW Middleweight Champion ====
Kuberski faced Tomasz Romanowski for the interim KSW Middleweight Championship on March 8, 2025. Kuberski won the fight via a third-round TKO, winning the interim championship in the process. This fight earned him his third career Fight of the Night bonus.

His first title defense came on August 9, 2025, against Radosław Paczuski. Kuberski won the fight via a third-round knockout, defending his championship in the process. This performance earned him his third career Knockout of the Night bonus.

His second title defense came on May 16, 2026, against Michał Michalski. Kuberski won the fight via a first-round TKO, defending his championship in the process. This performance earned him his second consecutive Knockout of the Night bonus.

== Professional boxing career ==
Kuberski made his professional boxing debut on December 18, 2020, against Hubert Krasuski. Kuberski won the fight via a Unanimous Decision.

== Championships and accomplishments ==
=== Mixed martial arts ===
- Konfrontacja Sztuk Walki
  - KSW Interim Middleweight Championship (One time; current)
    - Two successful title defenses
  - Fight of the Night (Two times)
  - Knockout of the Night (Two times)
- Fight Exclusive Night
  - FEN Middleweight Championship (One time; former)
    - Two successful title defenses
  - Knockout of the Night (Two times)
  - Fight of the Night (One time)

== Mixed martial arts record ==
Professional record breakdown
19 matches	18 wins	1 loss
By knockout	16	0
By submission	0	1
By decision	2	0

Res.	Record	Opponent	Method	Event	Date	Round	Time	Location	Notes
Win	18–1	Michał Michalski	TKO (punches)	KSW 118	May 16, 2026	1	2:09	Kalisz, Poland	Defended the interim KSW Middleweight Championship. Knockout of the Night.
Win	17–1	Radosław Paczuski	KO (head kick)	KSW 109	August 9, 2025	3	1:18	Warsaw, Poland	Defended the interim KSW Middleweight Championship. Knockout of the Night.
Win	16–1	Tomasz Romanowski	TKO (punches)	KSW 104	March 8, 2025	3	4:18	Gorzów Wielkopolski, Poland	Won the interim KSW Middleweight Championship. Fight of the Night.
Win	15–1	Damian Janikowski	TKO (punches)	KSW 100	November 16, 2024	2	0:47	Gliwice, Poland	Fight of the Night.
Win	14–1	Michał Materla	TKO (punches)	KSW 92	March 16, 2024	1	4:55	Gorzów Wielkopolski, Poland	
Win	13–1	Bartosz Leśko	KO (punches)	KSW 88	November 11, 2023	3	1:11	Radom, Poland	
Win	12–1	Kamil Wojciechowski	KO (punch)	Fight Exclusive Night 46	May 27, 2023	1	3:26	Piła, Poland	Defended the FEN Middleweight Championship. Knockout of the Night.
Win	11–1	Marcin Filipczak	KO (punches)	Fight Exclusive Night 44	January 28, 2023	2	1:10	Ostrów Wielkopolski, Poland	Defended the FEN Middleweight Championship. Knockout of the Night.
Win	10–1	Marcin Naruszczka	KO (punches)	Fight Exclusive Night 40	June 18, 2022	1	4:52	Ostróda, Poland	Won the vacant FEN Middleweight Championship.
Win	9–1	Krystian Bielski	Decision (unanimous)	Fight Exclusive Night 37	November 27, 2021	3	5:00	Wrocław, Poland	Fight of the Night.
Win	8–1	Mateusz Strzelczyk	TKO (punches)	Fight Exclusive Night 32	February 20, 2021	2	1:05	Warsaw, Poland	
Win	7–1	Markus Cuk	KO (punch)	Rocky Warriors Cartel 5	July 31, 2020	1	2:10	Mrągowo, Poland	
Win	6–1	Ahmed Saeb	Decision (unanimous)	UAE Warriors 10	January 31, 2020	3	5:00	Abu Dhabi, United Arab Emirates	Catchweight (181 lb) bout.
Win	5–1	Alexandr Gluschenko	TKO (elbows)	Slugfest 17	November 15, 2019	2	3:30	Gniezno, Poland	
Win	4–1	Adam Ugorski	TKO (punches)	Slugfest 16	May 24, 2019	2	4:49	Wągrowiec, Poland	
Loss	3–1	Jakub Kamieniarz	Submission (guillotine choke)	X Fight Series: Poznań Fight Night 3	February 9, 2019	2	2:20	Poznań, Poland	
Win	3–0	Sebastian Kostrzewa	KO (punches)	Extra Gale Sportow Walki: Night of Champions	October 13, 2018	1	1:22	Poznań, Poland	
Win	2–0	Nikolay Moskalets	TKO (punches)	Slugfest 14	April 13, 2018	1	1:32	Murowana Goślina, Poland	
Win	1–0	Piotr Judek	TKO (punches)	Gala Sportów Walki 3	November 17, 2012	1	2:38	Międzychód, Poland	Middleweight debut.

== Professional boxing record ==
1 fight	1 win	0 losses
By knockout	1	0

No.	Result	Record	Opponent	Type	Round, time	Date	Location	Notes
1	Win	1–0	Hubert Krasuski	UD	6	18 Dec 2020	Hala Sportowa, ul.Sosnowa 3, Pionki, Poland	

== See also ==
- List of current Konfrontacja Sztuk Walki fighters
- List of male mixed martial artists
- Interim championship
