= Miłosz Kruk =

Polish mixed martial artist (born 2003)

- Born: Miłosz Kruk; 19 May 2003 (age 23); Skarżysko-Kamienna, Poland
- Height: 5 ft 11 in (1.80 m)
- Weight: 155 lb (70 kg; 11 st 1 lb)
- Division: Featherweight (2023–2024, 2025); Lightweight (2024, 2026–present)
- Reach: 74.4 in (189 cm)
- Style: Kickboxing
- Fighting out of: Warsaw, Poland
- Team: Nemesis Pro Team
- Years active: 2023–present

Mixed martial arts record
- Total: 9
- Wins: 8
- By knockout: 3
- By submission: 2
- By decision: 3
- By disqualification: 0
- Losses: 1
- By knockout: 1
- By submission: 0
- By decision: 0

Other information
- Mixed martial arts record from Sherdog

Miłosz Kruk (born 19 May 2003) is a Polish professional mixed martial artist. He currently competes in the Lightweight division of Fight Exclusive Night (FEN). He is also the current FEN Featherweight Champion. He is a previous TFL Featherweight and Lightweight Champion.

== Professional career ==
=== Thunderstrike Fight League ===
Kruk made his professional debut on July 29, 2023, against Sebastian Świstak. Kruk won the fight via a first-round submission.

His next fight came on October 7, 2023, against Jerry Kvarnstrom. Kruk won the fight via a first-round TKO.

==== TFL Featherweight Champion ====
Kruk faced Dmitro Lastovetskiy on February 24, 2024, for the vacant TFL Featherweight Championship. Kruk won the fight via a Split Decision, thus winning his first career championship, and becoming the youngest champion in federation history.

=== Fight Exclusive Night ===
Kruk made his debut under Fight Exclusive Night (FEN) on October 5, 2024, against Gracjan Miś. Kruk lost the fight via a first-round knockout.

His next fight came on November 23, 2024, against Adam Rybczyński. Kruk won the fight via a Unanimous Decision.

=== Return to Thunderstrike Fight League ===
==== TFL Lightweight Champion ====
Kruk returned to Thunderstrike Fight League on December 21, 2024, where he faced Artur Szot for the vacant TFL Lightweight Championship in his hometown of Skarżysko-Kamienna. Kruk won the fight via a first-round knockout, winning his second career championship in the process, and becoming the federations first ever double champion.

=== Return to Fight Exclusive Night ===
==== FEN Featherweight Champion ====
Kruk returned to Fight Exclusive Night on June 21, 2025, where he faced Gracjan Miś in a rematch, this time for the vacant FEN Featherweight Championship. Kruk won the fight via a fifth-round submission, winning his third career championship in the process.

His next fight came on January 23, 2026, against Oleksandr Guliaiev in a non-title Lightweight bout. Kruk won the fight via a Unanimous Decision.

His next fight came on March 28, 2026, against Samir Akhmedov. Kruk won the fight at the end of the first round, after Akhmedov suffered an injury.

== Championships and accomplishments ==
=== Mixed martial arts ===
- Thunderstrike Fight League
  - TFL Featherweight Champion (One time; former)
  - TFL Lightweight Champion (One time; former)
- Fight Exclusive Night
  - FEN Featherweight Champion (One time; current)

== Mixed martial arts record ==
Professional record breakdown
9 matches	8 wins	1 loss
By knockout	3	1
By submission	2	0
By decision	3	0

Res.	Record	Opponent	Method	Event	Date	Round	Time	Location	Notes
Win	8–1	Samir Akhmedov	TKO (retirement)	Fight Exclusive Night 62	March 28, 2026	1	5:00	Częstochowa, Poland	
Win	7–1	Oleksandr Guliaiev	Decision (unanimous)	Fight Exclusive Night 61	January 23, 2026	3	5:00	Kielce, Poland	Return to Lightweight.
Win	6–1	Gracjan Miś	Submission (rear-naked choke)	Fight Exclusive Night 59	June 21, 2025	5	3:00	Lubin, Poland	Return to Featherweight; Won the vacant FEN Featherweight Championship
Win	5–1	Artur Szot	KO (punch)	Thunderstrike Fight League 32	December 21, 2024	1	2:05	Skarżysko-Kamienna, Poland	Won the vacant TFL Lightweight Championship.
Win	4–1	Adam Rybczyński	Decision (unanimous)	Fight Exclusive Night 57	November 23, 2024	3	5:00	Piotrków Trybunalski, Poland	Lightweight debut.
Loss	3–1	Gracjan Miś	KO (flying kene)	Fight Exclusive Night 56	October 5, 2024	1	1:37	Wrocław, Poland	
Win	3–0	Dmitro Lastovetskiy	Decision (split)	Thunderstrike Fight League 29	February 24, 2024	3	5:00	Kraśnik, Poland	Won the vacant TFL Featherweight Championship.
Win	2–0	Jerry Kvarnstrom	TKO (elbows)	Thunderstrike Fight League 28	October 7, 2023	1	0:42	Skarżysko-Kamienna, Poland	Catchweight (149 lb) bout.
Win	1–0	Sebastian Świstak	Submission (guillotine choke)	Thunderstrike Fight League 27	June 29, 2023	1	0:32	Końskie, Poland	Featherweight debut.

== See also ==
- List of male mixed martial artists
