= Featherweight (MMA) =

Weight class in mixed martial arts

The featherweight division in mixed martial arts refers to different weight classes:

- The UFC's featherweight division, which groups competitors within 136–145 lb (61.7-65.8 kg)
- The Shooto's featherweight division, which limits competitors to 135 lb (61.2 kg)
- The ONE Championship's featherweight division, with upper limit at 70.3 kg (155.0 lb)
- The Road FC's featherweight division, with upper limit at 145 lb (65.5 kg)

== Ambiguity and clarification ==
For the sake of uniformity, most American mixed martial arts media outlets consider Featherweight competitors to be between 136 and 145 lb (60 and 66 kg). King of the Cage (KOTC) refers to its 145 lb (66 kg) division as bantamweight whereas Shooto refers to its 143 lb (65 kg) division as lightweight. The UFC uses the Nevada definition of "featherweight".

The featherweight limit, as defined by the Nevada State Athletic Commission and the Association of Boxing Commissions is 145 lb (66 kg).

== Professional champions ==
=== Current champions ===
These tables were last updated in February of 2026.

Active title reign
Active title reign (interim)

Men:

Organization	Reign Began	Champion	Record	Defenses
UFC	April 14, 2025	(Australia) Alexander Volkanovski	29-4-0 (14KO 3SUB)	2
PFL	September 10, 2026	(Kyrgyzstan) Razhabali Shaydullaev	20-0-0 (7KO 12SUB)	0
RIZIN FF	May 4, 2025	(Kyrgyzstan) Razhabali Shaydullaev	20-0-0 (7KO 12SUB)	4
ACA	July 21, 2023	(Russia) Islam Omarov	17-0-0 (3KO 9SUB)	3
Brave CF	June 23, 2023	(Kyrgyzstan) Nemat Abdrashitov	19-9-0 (7KO 7SUB)	0
CFFC	May 24, 2025	(United States) Ryan Cafaro	14-6-0 (1) (4KO 7SUB)	1
Cage Warriors	November 15, 2025	(Republic of Ireland) Solomon Simon	7-0-0 (4KO 3SUB)	0
DEEP	March 9, 2024	(Japan) Jin Aoi	16-6-1 (7KO 2SUB)	0
FEN	June 21, 2025	(Poland) Miłosz Kruk	7-1-0 (2KO 2SUB)	0
Jungle Fight	July 29, 2023	(Brazil) Willian Souza	13-2-0 (9KO 2SUB)	1
KSW	December 18, 2021	(France) Salahdine Parnasse	22-2-0 (7KO 7SUB)	2
LUX Fight League	November 21, 2025	(Mexico) Irvin Amaya	13-5-0 (5KO 1SUB)	0
Oktagon MMA	January 31, 2026	(Austria) Mochamed Machaev	17-2-0 (1) (9KO 2SUB)	0
ONE Championship	August 26, 2022	(China) Tang Kai	20-3-0 (16KO 0SUB)	2

Women:

Organization	Reign Began	Champion	Record	Defenses
PFL	December 13, 2025	(Brazil) Cris Cyborg	30-2-0 (1) (21KO 2SUB)	0
Invicta FC	N/A	Vacant	N/A	N/A

== Most wins in featherweight title bouts ==
Note: the list includes wins in bouts for featherweight titles of major promotions (UFC, ONE, WEC, Bellator for men; UFC, Strikeforce, Invicta for women)
Note: the list includes both undisputed and interim champions
Active title reign

Men:

	Name	Promotion	Title bout wins
1.	(Brazil) José Aldo	WEC, UFC	11 (3 WEC, 8 UFC)
1.	(Brazil) Patrício Pitbull	Bellator	11
2.	(United States) Urijah Faber	WEC	6
2.	(Australia) Alexander Volkanovski	UFC	6
4.	(United States) Max Holloway	UFC	5
5.	(United States) Pat Curran	Bellator	4
5.	(Australia) Martin Nguyen	ONE	4
6.	(United States) Mike Brown	WEC	3
7.	(United States) Cole Escovedo	WEC	2
7.	(United States) Daniel Straus	Bellator	2
7.	(Republic of Ireland) Conor McGregor	UFC	2
7.	(Georgia (country)) Ilia Topuria	UFC	2
8.	(United States) Joe Soto	Bellator	1
8.	(United States) Joe Warren	Bellator	1
8.	(United States) A. J. McKee	Bellator	1
8.	(Mexico) Yair Rodríguez	UFC	1

Women:

	Name	Promotion	Title bout wins
1.	(Brazil) Cris Cyborg	Strikeforce, Invicta, UFC, Bellator, PFL	17 (3 Strikeforce, 4 Invicta, 3 UFC, 6 Bellator, 1 PFL)
2.	(Canada) Julia Budd	Bellator	3
2.	(Brazil) Amanda Nunes	UFC	3
3.	(Australia) Megan Anderson	Invicta	1
3.	(Netherlands) Germaine de Randamie	UFC	1
3.	(Canada) Felicia Spencer	Invicta	1

== See also ==
- List of current MMA Featherweight Champions
- List of current MMA Women's Featherweight Champions
- List of UFC Featherweight Champions
- List of WEC Featherweight Champions (defunct)
- List of Pancrase Featherweight Champions
- List of Road FC Featherweight Champions
