= Hala Sportowa Częstochowa =

Arena in Częstochowa, Poland

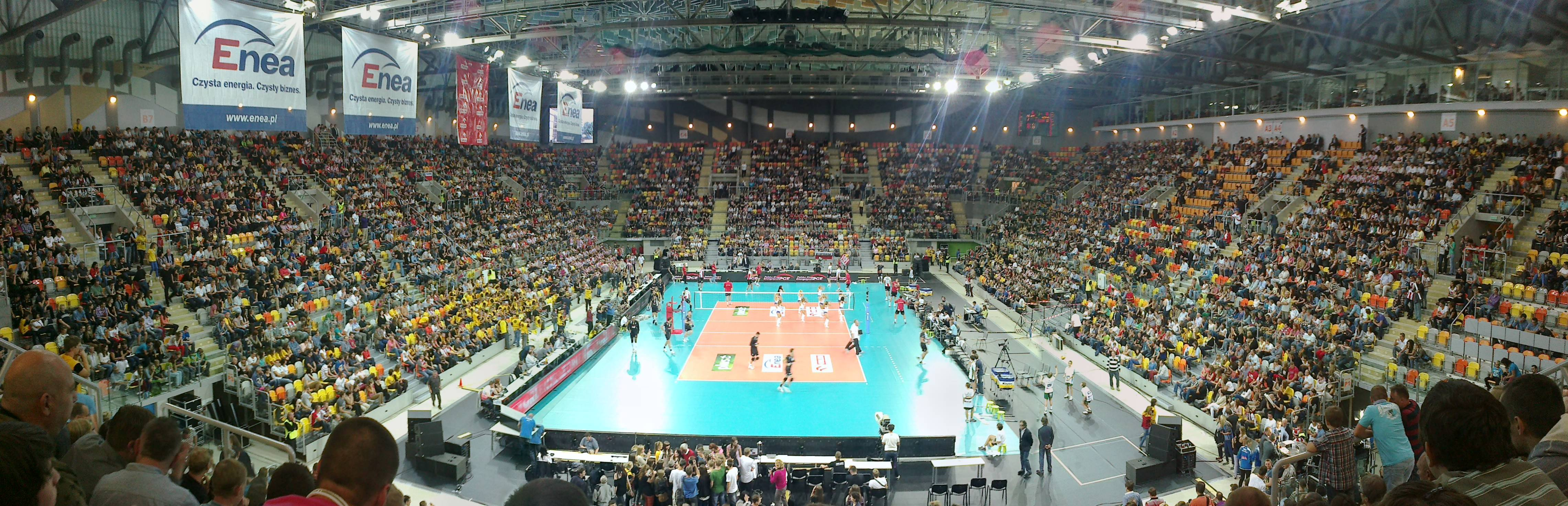
- Interactive map of Hala Sportowa Częstochowa
- Location: ul. Żużlowa 4 Czestochowa
- Coordinates: 50°48′16″N 19°9′7″E
- Owner: Częstochowa
- Operator: UNIBEP SA, Bielsk Podlaski
- Capacity: 5,843

Construction
- Opened: September 29, 2012

Tenants
- Norwid Częstochowa (PlusLiga); AZS Częstochowa (2012–2019); TT Elite Series

Hala Sportowa Częstochowa is a sport, show and fair arena in Częstochowa, Poland. In sport it is primarily used for volleyball, and also concerts. The arena was officially opened on September 29, 2012, during the SuperCup 2012 volleyball match – PGE Skra Bełchatów vs Asseco Resovia Rzeszów. Occasionally it is a place of playing matches of FIVB Volleyball World League.

== See also ==
- List of indoor arenas in Poland
- Sport in Poland
