= Welterweight (MMA) =

MMA weight class

The welterweight division in mixed martial arts contains different weight classes:

- The UFC's welterweight division, which groups competitors within 156 to 170 lb (71 to 77 kg)
- The ONE Championship's welterweight division, with upper limit at 83.9 kg (185.0 lb)

== Ambiguity and clarification ==
Many other sports that use the welterweight class, such as boxing, kickboxing, and Muay Thai, define it as below about 147 lb (67 kg). The MMA welterweight class is therefore significantly heavier than the welterweight class of these other sports. For the sake of uniformity, many American mixed martial arts websites refer to competitors between 156 and 170 lb (71 and 77 kg) as welterweights. This encompasses the Shooto middleweight division (167 lb / 76 kg).

The welterweight limit, as defined by the Nevada State Athletic Commission and the Association of Boxing Commissions is 170 lb (77kg).

== Professional Champions ==
=== Current champions ===
This table last updated in November 2026.

Organization	Reign began	Champion	Record	Defenses
UFC	November 15, 2025	(Russia) Islam Makhachev	29–1 (5KO 13SUB)	1
PFL	July 25, 2026	(United States) Thad Jean	12–0 (6KO 1SUB)	0
ONE Championship	November 18, 2022	(Canada) Christian Lee	18–5 (1) (13KO 4SUB)	1
KSW	April 22, 2023	(Poland) Adrian Bartosiński	18–1 (12KO 2SUB)	5
FEN	November 23, 2024	(Poland) Wawrzyniec Bartnik	12–5 (7KO 0SUB)	2
AMC Fight Nights	December 20, 2025	(Russia) Alexander Sarnavskiy	45–9 (13KO 23SUB)	1
Titan FC	June 2, 2023	(United States) Will Brooks	26–5 (7KO 6SUB)	0
ACA	December 5, 2025	(Kyrgyzstan) Zhakshylyk Myrzabekov	15–2 (6KO 2SUB)	0
Legacy Fighting Alliance	November 13, 2026	(Brazil) João Paulo Silva	10–4 (5KO 2SUB)	0
Cage Warriors	TBA	vacant	TBA	-

== Most wins in Welterweight title bouts ==
Note: the list includes wins in bouts for welterweight titles of major promotions (UFC, Strikeforce, WEC, Bellator)
Note: the list includes both undisputed and interim champions
Active title reign

	Name	Promotion	Title bout wins
1.	(Canada) Georges St-Pierre	UFC	12
2.	(United States) Matt Hughes	UFC	9
3.	(Nigeria) Kamaru Usman	UFC	6
4.	(United States) Pat Miletich	UFC	5
4.	(United States) Ben Askren	Bellator	5
4.	(United States) Nick Diaz	WEC, Strikeforce	5 (1 WEC, 4 Strikeforce)
4.	(United States) Carlos Condit	WEC, UFC	5 (4 WEC, 1 UFC)
5.	(United States) Tyron Woodley	UFC	4(+1^{a})
6.	(Brazil) Douglas Lima	Bellator	4
7.	(United States) Robbie Lawler	UFC	3
7.	(England) Leon Edwards	UFC	3

== See also ==
- List of current MMA Welterweight champions
- List of UFC Welterweight Champions
- List of Strikeforce Welterweight Champions
- List of Pancrase Welterweight Champions

== Notes ==
a.Fight was recorded as a "Majority Decision Draw". Woodley retained his title.
