= Tyson Nam =

American mixed martial artist (born 1983)

- Born: Tyson Ka’eo Nam; October 6, 1983 (age 43); Waimanalo, Hawaii, U.S.
- Height: 5 ft 7 in (170 cm)
- Weight: 135 lb (61 kg; 9 st 9 lb)
- Division: Flyweight (2015–present); Bantamweight (2006–present)
- Fighting out of: Portland, Oregon, U.S.
- Team: Sports Lab (2011–2016); Team Quest (until 2016) Hawaii Elite MMA (2016–2021); Gracie Technics (2021–present)
- Years active: 2006–present

Mixed martial arts record
- Total: 41
- Wins: 23
- By knockout: 15
- By submission: 1
- By decision: 7
- Losses: 17
- By knockout: 5
- By submission: 1
- By decision: 11
- Draws: 1

Other information
- Mixed martial arts record from Sherdog

Tyson Ka’eo Nam (born October 6, 1983) is an American professional mixed martial artist who competes in the Flyweight division. A professional since 2006, Nam has formerly competed for the Ultimate Fighting Championship, World Series of Fighting, Elite XC, and King of the Cage.

== Background ==
Born and raised in Waimanalo, Hawaii on the island of Oahu. Nam competed in various sports from a young age and began training in judo at the age of six before he began boxing in high school, then transitioned to kickboxing, before turning his focus to mixed martial arts. Nam attended and graduated from the University of Hawaii.

== Mixed martial arts ==
=== Early career ===
Nam began his professional MMA career in the Hawaii-based promotion, ICON Sport. Nam compiled a 3–1 record in the promotion during 2006 and was then signed to compete in Elite XC, in which he recorded a decision victory. Nam then fought in various other promotions, such as King of the Cage, before he was signed by Bellator Fighting Championships. Nam was signed in March 2011 as a short-notice replacement in the promotion's season 6 bantamweight tournament, after the original participant, Rodrigo Lima was forced to withdraw. However, Lima was later declared able to compete and was re-entered into the tournament, forcing Nam out. Bellator then apparently promised Nam a spot in the season 7 tournament, according to Nam's trainer, Phil Claud. However, in June, Nam was informed that the competition had been cancelled and he was released from his contract

=== Mainstream attention ===
Nam then took a fight in Brazil against the Bellator Bantamweight Champion, Eduardo Dantas. Dantas had been permitted by Bellator to fight against Nam, as the fight took place outside of the United States and wouldn't be aired on television in the U.S. either. The fight was in the Shooto Brazil promotion, in an event that served as a fundraiser for the "Batalhao de Operacoes Policiais Especiais" (Special Police Operations Battalion), which was Rio de Janeiro's military special forces. Just days prior to the bout, Dantas was ranked as the seventh best bantamweight in the world by Sherdog, making this Nam's most notable opponent to date. During the fight, Nam kept the action standing. Dantas attacked with multiple knees, before attempting a flying knee. After Dantas threw one more standing knee, Nam connected with a counter right hook which knocked Dantas unconscious.

=== Contract controversy ===
After his win over Dantas, Nam began to receive attention from various other promotions. However, it was announced that Bellator still had the right to match any contract offers he received from other promotions for up to 18 months after the contract expiration. Insider sources claimed that Bellator, UFC and the newly formed "World Series of Fighting" promotion had all showed interest in signing Nam. Though Bellator had previously released Nam without him ever participating in a fight, they took out the clause to enable them to attempt to re-sign Nam. This led to controversy and criticism about their contract-matching clause, especially after Nam revealed in an interview that he wanted to join the UFC, stating "I'm hoping the next time you guys see me fight is in the UFC."

Nam was apparently offered a spot in Bellator's next Bantamweight tournament, but Nam's management advised against it, given the two failed appearances prior. Nam's trainer, Phil Claud, also commented on the situation, stating: "Bellator is basically saying that they want to sit on Tyson. They want him to go into the tournament, which would not be matching the other fight agreements. We don't want to go into the tournament. This is the third tournament that's been promised to Tyson. Basically, they were saying if you don't (sign the tournament contract), we'll give you an individual fight deal sitting on [him] for a year." Claud also hinted that Bellator would sue Nam if the clause was violated.

After the UFC had tried to sign Nam and been made aware of the contract clause, UFC president, Dana White stated: "When you made the decision to cut him, you cut him. That's one of the dirtiest things you can do in the fight business. [Tyson Nam] is not going to make or break the UFC. But the problem is, the dirty scumbag moves that these guys are pulling hurts the fighter." Bellator CEO, Bjorn Rebney, later defended his contractual clauses, saying "The essence of them is that you're not asking to restrict a fighter's ability to fight. You're not looking to hold somebody back from participating. All you're asking for is, look, if we give you an incredible opportunity to fight our champion in a non-title fight, or we give you a great opportunity to be on TV, we at least want what most promoters believe is fair – the ability just to match another offer. Not to give you less, but to give you what somebody else is offering, and they're in every single agreement we have, and I think they're probably in every single agreement the UFC has, as well."

Despite Bellator's stance on the clauses, it was announced on September 26, 2012, Bellator had declined to match the second offer made by the World Series of Fighting promotion and that Nam had officially signed with WSOF.

=== World Series of Fighting ===
After Nam signed with the World Series of Fighting promotion, it was announced that his debut fight would be against the winner of the Miguel Torres vs. Marlon Moraes fight at WSOF 1 in November. Following Moraes' victory, Moraes and Nam met at World Series of Fighting 2 on March 23, 2013. Nam lost the fight via knockout in the first round.

=== Ultimate Fighting Championship ===
After more than a decade as a professional mixed martial artist, Nam signed with the Ultimate Fighting Championship on short notice to replace injured Alex Perez against Sergio Pettis on September 21, 2019, at UFC on ESPN+ 17. He lost the fight by unanimous decision.

Nam faced Kai Kara-France on February 23, 2020, at UFC Fight Night 168. He lost the fight via unanimous decision.

Nam was expected to face Ryan Benoit on June 13, 2020, at UFC on ESPN: Eye vs. Calvillo. However, on June 9, 2020, Benoit withdrew from the bout for unknown reason and he was replaced by promotional newcomer Zarrukh Adashev. At the weigh-ins on June 12, Adashev missed weight, weighing in at 138.5 pounds, 2.5 over the non-title bantamweight limit of 136 pounds. The bout proceeded at a catchweight and Adashev was fined 20% of his purse. Nam won the bout via knockout just 32 seconds into the first round. This win earned him the Performance of the Night award.

Nam was expected to face Matt Schnell on September 12, 2020, at UFC Fight Night 177. However, Schnell was removed from the fight on the day of the event's weigh-in for health issues related to his weight cut. As a result, the fight was cancelled.

Nam faced Jerome Rivera on September 19, 2020, at UFC Fight Night 178. He won the fight via technical knockout early into the second round.

The bout with Schell was rescheduled and was expected to take place on December 19, 2020, at UFC Fight Night 183. In turn, the contest eventually took place on January 20, 2021, at UFC on ESPN 20. Nam lost the bout by split decision.

Nam was scheduled to face Tagir Ulanbekov on June 19, 2021, at UFC on ESPN 25. However, the bout was never officially announced by the promotion and the matchup will not take place on the card due to a recent undisclosed illness for Ulanbekov.

The pair was rescheduled to meet on June 25, 2022, at UFC on ESPN 38 but Ulanbekov pulled out due to undisclosed injury.

Nam faced Ode' Osbourne on August 13, 2022, at UFC on ESPN 41. He won the fight via knockout in round one. This win earned him a Performance of the Night award.

Nam faced Bruno Gustavo da Silva on March 11, 2023, at UFC Fight Night 221. He lost the fight via technical submission due to a rear-naked choke in round two.

Nam faced Azat Maksum on July 15, 2023, at UFC Fight Night 224. He lost the fight via split decision.

After the bout, it was announced that Nam was no longer on the UFC roster.

=== Post UFC ===
In his first bout post UFC release, Nam faced Mark Coates on March 29, 2024 at Front Street Fights 28, knocking Coates out at the end of the first round.

Nam next faced Erik Vo at Destiny MMA: Bad Blood 2 on July 12, 2024, winning via TKO in the first round.

Nam is scheduled to face Abdul Hussein at Ice Cage Fighting 6 on December 26, 2025 in Espoo, Finland. The fight is for the inaugural Ice Cage Fighting Bantamweight Championship.

== Karate Combat career ==
On January 24, 2025, Nam made his Karate Combat debut against Loxbey Montalvan, winning via TKO in the second round.

== Dirty Boxing career ==
On August 29, 2025, Nam made his debut with Mike Perry's "Dirty Boxing Championships" promotion, facing Ricky Bandejas in the opening bout of the card. Nam won via TKO in the first round.

== Championships and accomplishments ==
=== Mixed martial arts ===
- Ultimate Fighting Championship
  - Performance of the Night (Two times) vs. Zarrukh Adashev and Ode' Osbourne

== Personal life ==
Nam's older brother, Jason Nam, a professional bodybuilder, was shot and killed outside of his apartment on March 10, 2006. Jason Nam was also engaged to his fiancé at the time.

== Mixed martial arts record ==
Professional record breakdown
41 matches	23 wins	17 losses
By knockout	15	5
By submission	1	1
By decision	7	11
Draws	1	

Res.	Record	Opponent	Method	Event	Date	Round	Time	Location	Notes
Loss	23–17–1	Aboubakar Younousov	TKO (doctor stoppage)	Ares FC 44	October 31, 2026	3	3:20	Eckbolsheim, France	For the Ares FC Bantamweight Championship.
Loss	23–16–1	Tuomas Grönvall	Decision (split)	Voimaa on! Fight Night 1	June 13, 2026	3	5:00	Joensuu, Finland	
Loss	23–15–1	Abdul Hussein	KO (punch)	Ice Cage Fighting 6	December 26, 2025	1	4:22	Espoo, Finland	For the inaugural ICF Bantamweight Championship.
Win	23–14–1	Erik Vo	TKO (punches to the body)	Destiny MMA: Bad Blood 2	July 12, 2024	1	2:56	Honolulu, Hawaii, United States	
Win	22–14–1	Mark Coates	TKO (punch)	Front Street Fights 28	March 29, 2024	1	4:39	Boise, Idaho, United States	Return to Bantamweight.
Loss	21–14–1	Azat Maksum	Decision (split)	UFC on ESPN: Holm vs. Bueno Silva	July 15, 2023	3	5:00	Las Vegas, Nevada, United States	
Loss	21–13–1	Bruno Gustavo da Silva	Technical Submission (rear-naked choke)	UFC Fight Night: Yan vs. Dvalishvili	March 11, 2023	2	1:23	Las Vegas, Nevada, United States	
Win	21–12–1	Ode' Osbourne	KO (punches)	UFC on ESPN: Vera vs. Cruz	August 13, 2022	1	2:59	San Diego, California, United States	Performance of the Night.
Loss	20–12–1	Matt Schnell	Decision (split)	UFC on ESPN: Chiesa vs. Magny	January 20, 2021	3	5:00	Abu Dhabi, United Arab Emirates	Return to Flyweight.
Win	20–11–1	Jerome Rivera	TKO (punches)	UFC Fight Night: Covington vs. Woodley	September 19, 2020	2	0:34	Las Vegas, Nevada, United States	
Win	19–11–1	Zarrukh Adashev	KO (punch)	UFC on ESPN: Eye vs. Calvillo	June 13, 2020	1	0:32	Las Vegas, Nevada, United States	Return to Bantamweight; Adashev missed weight (138.5 lb). Performance of the Night.
Loss	18–11–1	Kai Kara-France	Decision (unanimous)	UFC Fight Night: Felder vs. Hooker	February 23, 2020	3	5:00	Auckland, New Zealand	
Loss	18–10–1	Sergio Pettis	Decision (unanimous)	UFC Fight Night: Rodríguez vs. Stephens	September 21, 2019	3	5:00	Mexico City, Mexico	
Win	18–9–1	Shojin Miki	Decision (unanimous)	X-1 World Events 55	July 3, 2019	5	5:00	Waipahu, Hawaii, United States	Won the vacant X1 World Events Flyweight Championship.
Win	17–9–1	Donald Gonzalez	TKO (punches)	X-1 World Events 54	April 27, 2019	2	1:03	Honolulu, Hawaii, United States	Bantamweight bout.
Loss	16–9–1	Zhalgas Zhumagulov	Decision (unanimous)	Fight Nights Global 86	April 1, 2018	5	5:00	Almaty, Kazakhstan	
Win	16–8–1	Rizvan Abuev	KO (punch)	Fight Nights Global 75	October 6, 2017	1	4:45	Saint Petersburg, Russia	
Win	15–8–1	Ali Bagautinov	KO (head kick)	Fight Nights Global 64	April 28, 2017	3	4:59	Moscow, Russia	
Draw	14–8–1	Yoni Sherbatov	Draw (majority)	Triumph FC 1	April 22, 2016	3	5:00	Edmonton, Alberta, Canada	
Win	14–8	Ian Dela Cuesta	Decision (split)	Destiny MMA: Trinity Sports Combat	October 30, 2015	3	5:00	Kapolei, Hawaii, United States	Flyweight debut. Won the vacant Destiny MMA Flyweight Championship.
Win	13–8	Arnold Berdon	KO (punch)	Destiny MMA: Na Koa 10	August 1, 2015	1	4:52	Honolulu, Hawaii, United States	
Loss	12–8	Fernando Vieira	Decision (unanimous)	XFC International 8	December 13, 2014	3	5:00	São Paulo, Brazil	
Loss	12–7	Jeremiah Labiano	Decision (unanimous)	West Coast FC 11	September 13, 2014	5	5:00	Sacramento, California, United States	For the WCFC Bantamweight Championship.
Loss	12–6	Cody Bollinger	Decision (unanimous)	WSOF 8	January 18, 2014	3	5:00	Hollywood, Florida, United States	
Loss	12–5	Marlon Moraes	KO (head kick and punches)	WSOF 2	March 23, 2013	1	2:55	Atlantic City, New Jersey United States	
Win	12–4	Eduardo Dantas	KO (punch)	Shooto Brazil 33	August 25, 2012	1	1:36	Rio de Janeiro, Brazil	Return to Bantamweight.
Win	11–4	Chanti Johnson	Decision (unanimous)	CageSport 16	October 1, 2011	3	5:00	Tacoma, Washington, United States	
Win	10–4	Chuck Jordan	TKO (punches)	SportFight: Brawl at the Barn	September 9, 2011	1	0:52	Prineville, Oregon, United States	Catchweight (139 lb) bout.
Win	9–4	Chanti Johnson	TKO (punches)	United Combat Sports: Caged Combat 4	July 29, 2011	1	0:45	Grand Ronde, Oregon, United States	Featherweight debut.
Loss	8–4	Jesse Brock	Decision (unanimous)	SportFight 29	January 28, 2011	5	5:00	Grand Ronde, Oregon, United States	For the vacant SportFight Bantamweight Championship.
Loss	8–3	Keola Silva	Decision (majority)	Galaxy MMA: Worlds Collide	May 1, 2010	3	5:00	Honolulu, Hawaii, United States	
Win	8–2	Nick Honstein	TKO (punches)	SportFight 27	March 12, 2010	2	3:31	Grand Ronde, Oregon, United States	
Win	7–2	Zach Lari	Decision (unanimous)	Arena Rumble: Horn vs. Guida	September 12, 2009	3	5:00	Spokane, Washington, United States	
Win	6–2	Zach Skinner	KO (punches)	KOTC: Thunderstruck	August 15, 2009	1	4:58	Everett, Washington, United States	
Win	5–2	Butch McGavran	Submission (rear-naked choke)	Northwest Invitational: Carnage at the Creek 6	June 6, 2009	1	3:26	Shelton, Washington, United States	
Loss	4–2	Russell Doane	TKO (punches)	Icon Sport: Baroni vs. Hose	March 15, 2008	1	2:33	Honolulu, Hawaii, United States	
Win	4–1	Albert Manners	Decision (unanimous)	EliteXC: Uprising	September 15, 2007	3	5:00	Honolulu, Hawaii, United States	
Loss	3–1	Mark Oshiro	TKO (punches)	Icon Sport: Mayhem vs. Trigg	December 1, 2006	1	2:16	Honolulu, Hawaii, United States	For the vacant Icon Sport Bantamweight Championship.
Win	3–0	Ikaika Silva	Decision (unanimous)	Icon Sport: Mayhem vs. Lawler	September 2, 2006	3	5:00	Honolulu, Hawaii, United States	
Win	2–0	Bill Dexter	Decision (unanimous)	Icon Sport: Mayhem vs. Giant	May 26, 2006	3	3:00	Honolulu, Hawaii, United States	
Win	1–0	Ryan Lee	TKO (punches)	Icon Sport: Lawler vs. Niko 2	February 25, 2006	3	1:01	Honolulu, Hawaii, United States	Bantamweight debut.

== Karate Combat record ==
Professional record breakdown
1 match	1 win	0 losses
By knockout	1	0

Res.	Record	Opponent	Method	Event	Date	Round	Time	Location	Notes
Win	1–0	Loxbey Montalvan	TKO (Right Cross)	Karate Combat 52	January 24, 2025	2	0:54	Miami, Florida, United States	Karate Combat Debut

== Dirty Boxing record ==
Professional record breakdown
1 match	1 win	0 losses
By knockout	1	0

Res.	Record	Opponent	Method	Event	Date	Round	Time	Location	Notes
Win	1-0	Ricky Bandejas	TKO (Right Hook to Ground and Pound)	Dirty Boxing Championship 3	August 29, 2025	1	2:28	The Hangar at Regatta Harbour, Miami, Florida	Dirty Boxing Debut
