= Eagle Fighting Championship =

Mixed martial arts promotion

- Current season, competition or edition: 2022 in Eagle Fighting Championship
- Formerly: Federation of MMA of Samara (FMMAS); Gorilla Fighting Championship (GFC)
- Sport: Mixed martial arts
- Founded: May 2017 (FMMAS/GFC); Dec 2020 (EFC)
- Owners: Khabib Nurmagomedov; Rizvan Magomedov; Shamil Zavurov
- Headquarters: Dagestan, Russia

Eagle Fighting Championship (EFC), commonly referred to as Eagle FC, is a Russian mixed martial arts promotion company established in 2020 by former UFC Lightweight Champion Khabib Nurmagomedov. It was renamed to Eagle Fighting Championship (EFC) after Nurmagomedov bought Gorilla Fighting Championship (GFC) for $1 million.

== History ==
In November 2020, Khabib Nurmagomedov bought the Russian MMA promotion Gorilla Fighting Championship (formerly known as Federation of MMA of Samara), for $1 million and renamed it to Eagle Fighting Championship (EFC).

GFC had been in the industry since 2017 and was on the edge of bankruptcy. When Nurmagomedov retired, he acquired the promotion and became the promoter.

EFC held their first event in the USA on January 28, 2022 in Miami, Florida.

== Weight divisions ==
Weight class name	Upper limit	
Weight class name	Before 2022	After 2022
Strawweight	115 lb (52.2 kg)	N/A
Flyweight	125 lb (56.7 kg)	125 lb (56.7 kg)
Bantamweight	135 lb (61.2 kg)	135 lb (61.2 kg)
Featherweight	145 lb (65.8 kg)	145 lb (65.8 kg)
Lightweight	155 lb (70.3 kg)	155 lb (70.3 kg)
Super lightweight	N/A	165 lb (74.8 kg)
Welterweight	170 lb (77.1 kg)	175 lb (79.4 kg)
Middleweight	185 lb (83.9 kg)	185 lb (83.9 kg)
Light heavyweight	N/A	205 lb (93.0 kg)
Heavyweight	265 lb (120.2 kg)	265 lb (120.2 kg)

== Events ==
=== Scheduled events ===
Event	Date	Venue	Location

=== Past events ===
Event title	Date	Arena	Location
Eagle FC 55: Alkhasov vs. Torosyan	November 9, 2024		Yakutsk, Russia
Eagle FC 54: Yamilov vs. Mamedov	November 11, 2023		Almetyevsk, Russia
Eagle FC 53: Yaskovets vs. Abdurakov	August 18, 2023		Yakutsk, Russia
Eagle FC 52: Chergesov vs. Tuyakov	June 17, 2023		Dagestan, Russia
Eagle FC 51: Izmodenov vs. Mukhtarov	December 10, 2022	KSK Zhayyk	Atyrau, Kazakhstan
Eagle FC 50: Nurgozhay vs. Andreitsev	August 21, 2022	Barys Arena	Nur-Sultan, Kazakhstan
Eagle FC 49: Busurmankul vs. Magomedov	August 10, 2022		Bishkek, Kyrgyzstan
Eagle FC 48 & Naiza FC 41	July 16, 2022		Aktau, Kazakhstan
Eagle FC 47: Dos Santos vs. De Castro	May 20, 2022	FTX Arena	Miami, Florida, U.S.
Eagle FC 46: Lee vs. Sanchez	March 11, 2022	FTX Arena	Miami, Florida, U.S.
Eagle FC 45: Busurmankul vs. Magomedov	February 18, 2022	Crocus Expo	Moscow, Russia
Eagle FC 44: Spong vs. Kharitonov	January 28, 2022	FTX Arena	Miami, Florida, U.S.
EFC 43	December 10, 2021		Moscow, Russia
EFC 42	October 17, 2021	WOW Arena	Sochi, Russia
EFC 41/AMC Fight Nights	September 17, 2021	Crocus Expo Arena	Moscow, Russia
EFC 40	September 4, 2021	Sport Complex Jubilee	Almetyevsk, Russia
EFC 39	August 22, 2021		Nizhny Novgorod, Russia
EFC 38	August 3, 2021		Issyk Kul, Kyrgyzstan
EFC 37	August 22, 2021	Almaty Arena	Almaty, Kazakhstan

== Current champions ==
Class	Upper weight limit	Champion	Date	Defenses
Heavyweight	265 lb (120 kg; 18.9 st)	Vacant		
Light heavyweight	205 lb (93 kg; 14.6 st)	(Kazakhstan) Diyar Nurgozhay	August 21, 2022	0
Middleweight	185 lb (84 kg; 13.2 st)	(Kazakhstan) Dauren Ermekov	December 25, 2019	2
Welterweight	175 lb (79 kg; 12.5 st)	Vacant		
Super lightweight	165 lb (75 kg; 11.8 st)	Vacant		
Lightweight	155 lb (70 kg; 11.1 st)	(Azerbaijan) Ramin Sultanov	November 11, 2023	0
Featherweight	145 lb (66 kg; 10.4 st)	Vacant		
Bantamweight	135 lb (61 kg; 9.6 st)	(Russia) Renat Khavalov	March 19, 2021	3
Flyweight	125 lb (57 kg; 8.9 st)	(Russia) Irgit Oveenchi	August 10, 2022	0

== Championship history ==
=== Heavyweight Championship ===
206 to 265 lb (93 to 120 kg)

No.	Name	Event	Date	Defenses
1	(Russia) Shamil Abasov def. Alexander Soldatkin	Battle on Volga 4 Samara, Russia	May 11, 2018	1. def. Yuriy Protzenko at Battle on Volga 8 on December 14, 2018
2	(Russia) Rizvan Kuniev	GFC 16; Astrakhan, Russia	August 30, 2019	1. def. Vladimir Dayneko at EFC 31 on December 20, 2020; 2. def. Anthony Hamilton at Eagle FC 46 on March 11, 2022
Kuniev vacated the title on December 6, 2022, when he signed with Professional Fighters League.

=== Light Heavyweight Championship ===
186 to 205 lb (84 to 93 kg)

No.	Name	Event	Date	Defenses
Current	(Kazakhstan) Diyar Nurgozhay def. Konstantin Andreitsev	Eagle FC 50; Nur-Sultan, Kazakhstan	August 21, 2022	

=== Middleweight Championship ===
175 to 185 lb (79 to 84 kg)

No.	Name	Event	Date	Defenses
1	(Russia) Rinat Fakhretdinov def. Alberto Uda	GFC 11; Penza, Russia	May 3, 2019	1. def. Jhonny Carlos at GFC 16 on August 30, 2019
Fakhretdinov vacated when he chose to test free agency.
2	(Tajikistan) Faridun Odilov def. Sergey Kalinin	EFC 33; Moscow, Russia	February 9, 2021	1. def. Enoc Solves Torres at EFC 43 on December 10, 2021
–	(Kazakhstan) Dauren Ermekov def. Gamzat Khiramagomedov for interim title	Eagle FC 48 & Naiza FC 41; Aktau, Kazakhstan	July 16, 2022	
Odilov was stripped of the title due to injury. Ermekov promoted to champ
3	(Kazakhstan) Dauren Ermekov	Eagle FC 48 & Naiza FC 41; Aktau, Kazakhstan	July 16, 2022	
Ermekov vacated when he chose to test free agency.

=== Welterweight Championship ===
166 to 175 lb (75 to 79 kg)

No.	Name	Event	Date	Defenses
1	(Russia) Magomed Umalatov def. Aleksey Novikov	GFC 16; Astrakhan, Russia	August 30, 2019	1. def. Rashid Koychakaev at EFC 31 on December 20, 2020
Umalatov vacated in May 2020 when he signed with PFL
2	(Tajikistan) Samandar Murodov def. Maxim Shvets	Eagle FC 41; Moscow, Russia	September 17, 2021	
–	(Russia) Imam-Shapi Mukhtarov def. Azamat Dzhigkaev for interim title	Eagle FC 50; Nur-Sultan, Kazakhstan	August 21, 2022	
Murodov vacated to test free agency.
3	(Russia) Denis Izmodenov def. Imam-Shapi Mukhtarov	Eagle FC 51; Atyrau, Kazakhstan	December 10, 2022	
Izmodenov vacated on April 2023 when he signed with ACA.

=== Lightweight Championship ===
146 to 155 lb (66 to 70 kg)

No.	Name	Event	Date	Defenses
1	(Russia) Maksim Trunov def. Timur Gilimzyanov	Battle on Volga 10; Toliatti, Russia	April 14, 2019	
2	(Russia) Anvar Chergesov	GFC 18; Samara, Russia	October 6, 2019	
-	(Russia) Gadzhi Rabadanov def. João Paulo Silva	GFC 24; Samara, Russia	February 9, 2020	
3	(Tajikistan) Jahongir Saidjamolov	GFC 29; Samara, Russia	October 16, 2020	
Saidjamolov vacated when he signed with Brave Combat Federation
4	(Russia) Gadzhi Rabadanov promoted to undisputed champion	GFC 24; Samara, Russia	February 9, 2020	
5	(Russia) Mehdi Dakaev def. Gadzhi Rabadanov	EFC 30; Moscow, Russia	December 4, 2020	1. def. Uzair Abdurakov at EFC 35 on April 06, 2021; 2. def. Magomed Zaynukov at EFC 43 on December 10, 2021
Dakaev vacated on April 2023 when he signed with ACA.
Current	(Azerbaijan) Ramin Sultanov def. Magomed Kurbanov	Eagle FC 54; Almetyevsk, Russia	November 11, 2023	

=== Featherweight Championship ===
136 to 145 lb (61 to 66 kg)

No.	Name	Event	Date	Defenses
1	(Russia) Abdurakhman Gitinovasov def. Mark Volkov	Battle on Volga 6 Samara, Russia	September 23, 2018	1. def. Ivan Zhvirblia at Battle on Volga 8 on December 14, 2018
2	(Armenia) Jora Ayvazyan	Battle on Volga 10; Toliatti, Russia	April 14, 2019	
3	(Russia) Rasul Magomedov	EFC 30; Moscow, Russia	December 4, 2020	
4	(Russia) Ruslan Yamanbaev	EFC 35; Moscow, Russia	April 6, 2021	
5	(Kyrgyzstan) Busurmankul Abdibait Uulu	EFC 38; Issyk Kul, Kyrgyzstan	August 3, 2021	
-	(Russia) Rasul Magomedov def. Abdurakhman Gitinovasov for interim title	Eagle FC 45; Moscow, Russia	February 18, 2022	
6	(Russia) Rasul Magomedov	Eagle FC 49; Bishkek, Kyrgyzstan	August 10, 2022	
Magomedov vacated in August 2023 when he signed with ACA.

=== Bantamweight Championship ===
126 to 135 lb (57 to 61 kg)

No.	Name	Event	Date	Defenses
1	(Russia) Umar Nurmagomedov def. Fatkhidin Sobirov	Battle on Volga 4 Samara, Russia	May 11, 2018	1. def. Wagner Lima at Battle on Volga 10 on April 14, 2019; 2. def. Taras Grytskiv at GFC 14 on July 13, 2019; 3. def. Braian Gonzalez at GFC 20 on November 23, 2019
Title was vacated on February 27, 2020 when Nurmagomedov signed with the UFC
Current	(Russia) Renat Khavalov def. Khasan Esmurziev	GFC 26; Penza, Russia	July 11, 2020	1. def. Sharapudin Magomedov at EFC 34 on March 19, 2021; 2. def. Patrizio de Souza at EFC 42 on October 17, 2021; 3. def. Ramazan Amaev at Eagle FC 48 & Naiza FC 41 on July 16, 2022; 4. def. Renat Ondar at Eagle FC 51 on December 10, 2022

=== Flyweight Championship ===
116 to 125 lb (53 to 57 kg)

No.	Name	Event	Date	Defenses
1	(Russia) Ali Bagautinov def. Denis Araujo	Battle on Volga 6 Samara, Russia	September 23, 2018	
Bagautinov vacated the title when he signed with Fight Nights Global.
2	(Russia) Tagir Ulanbekov def. Aleksandr Podlesniy	GFC 11; Penza, Russia	May 3, 2019	1. def. Denis Araujo at GFC 17 on September 27, 2019; 2. def. Denilson Matos at GFC 22 on December 13, 2019
Ulanbekov vacated the title in May 2020 when he signed with the UFC.
3	(Russia) Mansur Malachiev def. Ruslan Sariev	EFC 33; Moscow, Russia	February 9, 2021	1. def. Rashid Vagabov at EFC 38 on August 3, 2021
Malachiev was stripped of the title in 2022 due to injury.
Current	(Russia) Irgit Oveenchi def. Magomedrasul Gadzhiev	Eagle FC 49; Bishkek, Kyrgyzstan	August 10, 2022	

=== Women's divisions (defunct) ===
==== Women's Bantamweight Championship ====
126 pounds (57 kg) to 135 pounds (61 kg)

No.	Name	Event	Date	Defenses
1	(Poland) Marta Waliczek def. Karina Vasilenko	Battle on Volga 4 Samara, Russia	May 11, 2018	1. def. Zaira Dyshekova at Battle on Volga 10 on April 14, 2019
Federation of MMA of Samara becomes GFC. The title was subsequently deactivated

==== Women's Flyweight Championship ====
116 pounds (53 kg) to 125 pounds (57 kg)

No.	Name	Event	Date	Defenses
1	(Uzbekistan) Liliya Shakirova def. Aygul Kuzu Abduvakhid	GFC 18; Samara, Russia	October 06, 2019	
GFC becomes EFC. The title was subsequently deactivated

== Notable athletes and alumni ==
- Diego Sanchez: Former UFC Lightweight Championship Contender. TUF 1 Middleweight Tournament Winner. Former KOTC Welterweight Champion.
- Kevin Lee: Former UFC interim Lightweight Championship Contender
- Renan Barão: Former UFC Bantamweight Champion
- Rashad Evans: Former UFC Light Heavyweight Champion
- Antônio Silva: Former UFC Heavyweight Fighter
- Junior dos Santos: Former UFC Heavyweight Champion
- Ray Borg: Former UFC Flyweight Title Challenger
- Umar Nurmagomedov: Current UFC Bantamweight. Former UFC Bantamweight Title Challenger. Cousin of Eagle FC founder Khabib Nurmagomedov. Ex-Combat Sambo Champion (Not FIAS). Former Bantamweight Champion of GFC
- Usman Nurmagomedov: Current PFL Lightweight Champion. Former Bellator Lightweight Champion. Cousin of Khabib Nurmagomedov. Younger brother of Umar Nurmagomedov
- Tagir Ulanbekov: Current UFC Flyweight and former Flyweight Champion of GFC. Ex-World Combat Sambo Champion (Not FIAS).

== See also ==
- Eagles MMA
