= 12–6 elbow =

Mixed martial arts illegal technique

A 12–6 elbow, referred to in commentary as a "twelve to six elbow" and officially "downward elbow strikes", is a strike used in the combat sport of mixed martial arts (MMA). The name of the 12–6 elbow is based on the concept of a clock on the wall with the bringing of an elbow from straight up (12 o'clock) to straight down (6 o'clock). These elbow strikes were illegal under the Unified Rules of Mixed Martial Arts from their inception, until 1 November 2024.

== Definition ==
The most commonly accepted definition of a 12–6 elbow was originally based on a principle by referee John McCarthy of a clock on the wall. This came about after it was felt that the official definition of the foul was too broad. A 12–6 elbow was defined as bringing the elbow from "twelve o'clock" to "six o'clock", which is where the name comes from. An attack like this can prevent a fighter from defending due to the elbow landing vertically; in defense, a straight or bent arm is easily bypassed. Similar elbow movements from a fighter on their back does not count as a 12–6 elbow, because as explained by McCarthy, "the clock doesn't move". McCarthy's definition became accepted as the official definition of 12–6 elbows under the Unified Rules and MMA referees were encouraged to use this definition when making judgments on elbow strikes.

Generally for usage of 12–6 elbows, the fight is stopped and fighters are given a warning. However, there have been occasions where points have been deducted or the fighter using that strike in competition has been disqualified due to the move incapacitating fighters. In 2009, Matt Hamill defeated Jon Jones by disqualification due to Jones using 12–6 elbows. Hamill said that he was unable to defend against the elbows.

== In mixed martial arts ==
Before 2000, MMA had a number of different rule sets, with each one differing in ruling on downward elbow strikes (12–6 elbows). In UFC 1, the first UFC event where there were very few rules, Kevin Rosier used 12–6 elbows on Zane Frazier. In 2000, the Unified Rules of Mixed Martial Arts were drawn up to try to make the sport more mainstream. The meeting consisted of representatives of a number of major MMA organizations including Ultimate Fighting Championship (UFC), Pride Fighting Championships and International Fighting Championships (IFC) as well as doctors and referees in New Jersey, United States. In the meeting, doctors raised concerns about 12–6 elbows after seeing an IFC match where 12–6 elbows were used to the back of a fighter's head. One doctor argued that they could be life-threatening, and refused to sanction any set of rules that did not prohibit them.

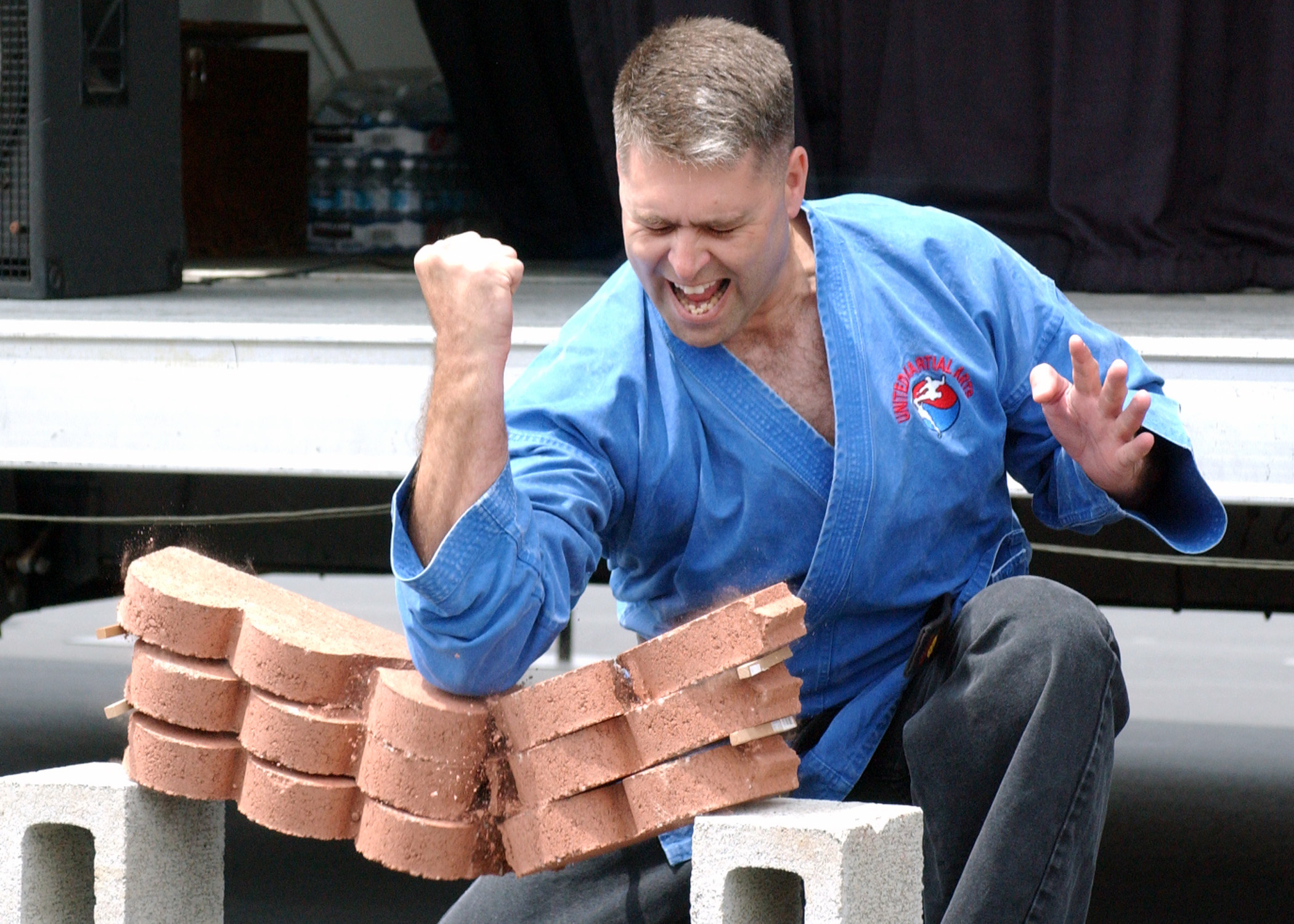
A 12–6 elbow being used on bricks

McCarthy argued that the rules already prohibited strikes to the back of the head and questioned if it was just the 12–6 elbow strike that was the problem. Following this discussion, Nick Lembo wrote the Unified Rules, including a rule prohibiting downward elbow strikes. McCarthy felt that Lembo wrote the rule relating to downward elbow strikes "poorly" as he felt the definition was broad and left the rule open to interpretation. Pride eventually did not adopt the Unified Rules; however, their ruleset prohibited any elbow strikes to the head. Eventually the rule on 12–6 elbows meant that very few fighters attempted them, which could also be attributed to the fact that it is difficult for fighters to get into a position where they could use them.

The primary justification for banning 12–6 strikes was the damage that could result from such a strike on the orbital bone, and the potential for spinal injuries if 12–6 elbows were used in certain positions, due to size differences between fighters. This was before weight classes were standardised. There was a popular story, often repeated by Joe Rogan in UFC commentary, that the 12–6 elbows were banned because representatives of Athletic Commissions had seen traditional martial artists breaking hard objects with downward elbow strikes and felt that those strikes could be lethal and banned them. However Keith Kizer of the Nevada State Athletic Commission dismissed this as being "revisionist history".

In 2006, the Association of Boxing Commissions (ABC) held a committee meeting to revise the Unified Rules. During it, Kizer and Lembo proposed altering the rule on downward elbow strikes to permit 12–6 elbows to anywhere except the head of a downed opponent. However, the proposal was strongly rejected by doctors on the committee on the grounds that 12–6 elbows could still cause serious injury, even when not done on the head. The ABC, despite endorsing the Unified Rules, does not have statutory authority over the individual state athletic commissions in the United States but instead governs through influence. As a result, in some states such as Mississippi, 12–6 elbows are permitted in MMA fights. As a result, a commission was set up by ABC to look at the regional MMA rule variations, including 12–6 elbows, to standardise MMA in the United States.

== Criticism ==
The 12–6 elbow has often been criticized for its brutality, however, the rules prohibiting them have also been criticized. In particular, it has been argued that the term "downward elbow strikes" is too strict, as it only applies to straight motions and does not make elbows on an arc illegal. Matt Hume, chief referee of the One Fighting Championship, explained that while 12–6 elbows were illegal, "if you change the time to 11:59, it is no longer illegal." Hume felt that the authors of the Unified Rules did not have an understanding of MMA, with McCarthy affirming that view by stating that Lembo "wasn't a big MMA guy at the time". Hume also argued that the rule meant that other elbow strikes that could gain more velocity than 12–6 elbows were legal yet were hitting with the same point of the elbow.

Because of the initially broad definition of 12–6 elbows in the Unified Rules, referees often had differences in interpretation of what was classed as one. Referee Herb Dean differed from McCarthy's definition and argued that elbow strikes parallel with the floor in side control (sometimes called 9–3 elbows) were classed as 12–6 elbows, as he considered 12–6 elbows as being based on where the fighter throwing them was positioned.

== Legalisation ==
On 30 January 2024, the Association of Boxing Commissions' MMA Rules Committee met and voted to address the illegality of the 12–6 elbow under the Unified Rules. They proposed removing the ban which was accepted by the committee. The ABC's full committee later voted in favour of abolishing the ban on the 12–6 elbow, effective from 1 November 2024 pending local athletic commissions' approval. UFC President Dana White said in response that he would look to have Jones' loss to Hamill overturned as a result. UFC removed the ban on 12–6 elbows in time for UFC Fight Night 246 on 2 November. The first legal 12–6 elbow thrown following legalisation was done by Gillian Robertson on Luana Pinheiro at UFC Vegas 100.

== See also ==
- Soccer kick, another controversial MMA strike
- 12–6 curveball, a baseball pitch with similar top-to-bottom movement
