= Marcin Jabłoński =

Polish mixed martial artist (born 1992)

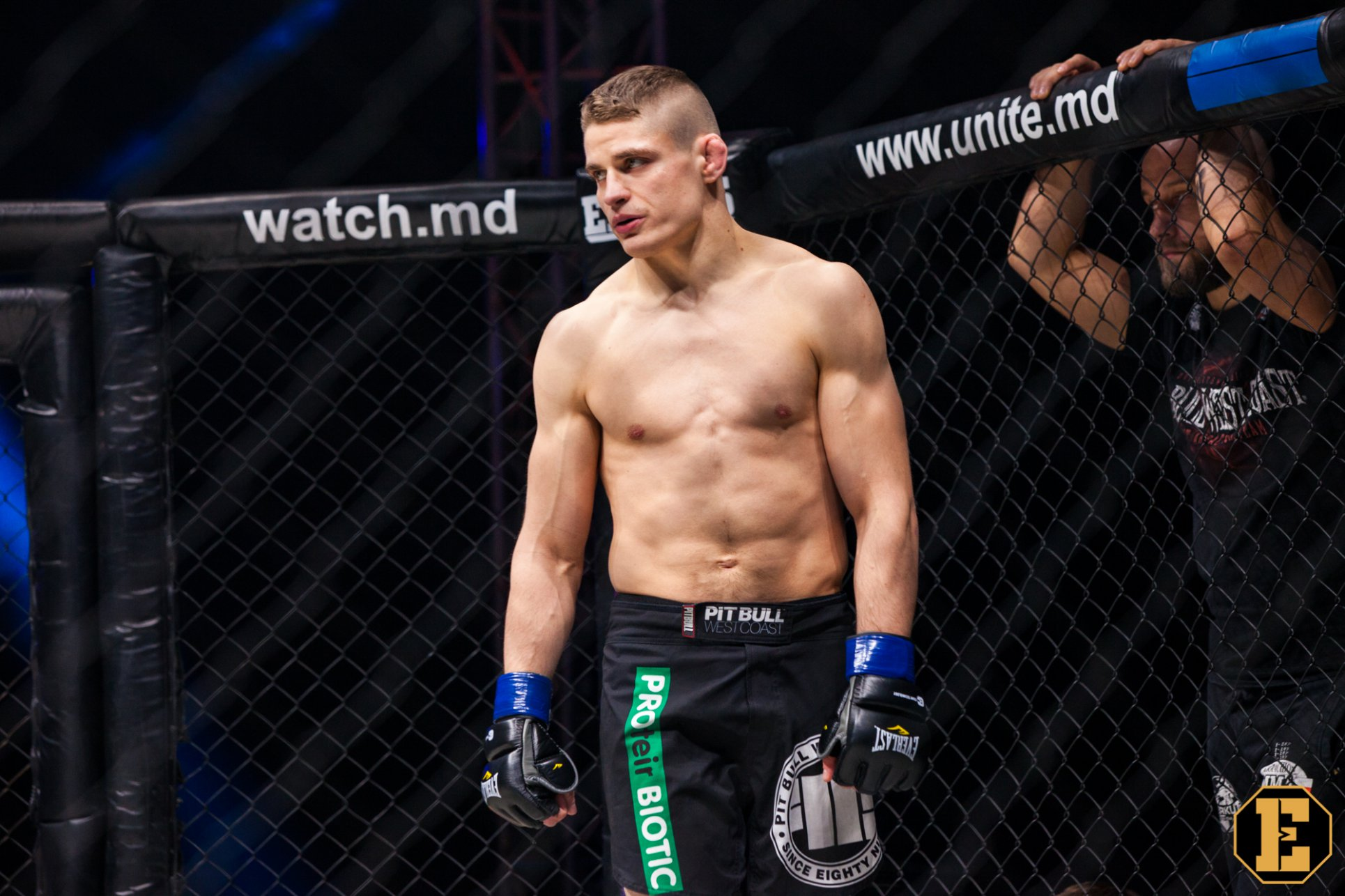
- Born: Marcin Jabłoński; 6 July 1992 (age 34); Olsztyn, Poland
- Height: 5 ft 9 in (1.75 m)
- Weight: 155 lb (70 kg; 11 st 1 lb)
- Division: Featherweight (2015, 2016); Lightweight (2014–present)
- Reach: 69.3 in (176 cm)
- Style: Brazilian Jiu-jitsu, Kickboxing
- Fighting out of: Olsztyn, Poland
- Team: Arrachion MMA Olsztyn; Skra Fight Club Warsaw
- Years active: 2014–present

Mixed martial arts record
- Total: 19
- Wins: 15
- By knockout: 0
- By submission: 8
- By decision: 7
- By disqualification: 0
- Losses: 4
- By knockout: 4
- By submission: 0
- By decision: 0

Other information
- Mixed martial arts record from Sherdog

Marcin Jabłoński (born 6 July 1992) is a Polish professional mixed martial artist. He currently competes in the Lightweight division. He has previously competed on Absolute Championship Berkut (ACB), Eagle FC, Babilon MMA, and Fight Exclusive Night (FEN MMA).

== Professional career ==
=== Early career ===
Jabłoński made his professional debut on November 14, 2014, against Damian Zorczykowski. Jabłoński won the fight via a first-round submission.

His next fight came on March 28, 2015, against Adrian Błoński. Jabłoński won the fight via a first-round submission.

His next fight came on August 22, 2015, against Jakub Martys. Jabłoński won the fight via a Unanimous Decision.

His next fight came on April 9, 2016, against Gracjan Szadziński. Jabłoński lost the fight via a first-round TKO.

=== Absolute Championship Berkut ===
Jabłoński made his only appearance under Absolute Championship Berkut (ACB) on September 24, 2016, against Armen Stepanyan. Jabłoński lost the fight via a first-round TKO.

=== International Fights ===
Following a near year and a half layoff, Jabłoński made his return to fighting debuting under Moldovan federation Eagles Fighting Championship on February 10, 2018, against Gheorghe Panfilii. Jabłoński won the fight via a Unanimous Decision.

Jabłoński made his debut under Austrian federation Tosan Fight Night on September 15, 2018, against Roberto Pastuch. Jabłoński won the fight via a Unanimous Decision.

Jabłoński returned to Eagles Fighting Championship on February 16, 2019, against Aleksandr Grebnev. Jabłoński won the fight via a Split Decision.

=== Celtic Gladiator ===
Jabłoński made his debut under Celtic Gladiator on December 13, 2019, against Kacper Bróździak. Jabłoński won the fight via a first-round submission.

=== Babilon MMA ===
Jabłoński made his debut under Babilon MMA on June 26, 2020, against Adam Brzezowski. Jabłoński won the fight via a Unanimous Decision.

His next fight came on November 27, 2020, against Paata Tsxapelia. Jabłoński won the fight via a Unanimous Decision.

His next fight came on May 22, 2021, against Alan Langer. Jabłoński won the fight via a third-round submission.

Jabłoński made a one-off appearance under Ukrainian federation Professional League Storm on December 18, 2021, facing Maxim Pashkov. Jabłoński won the fight via a second-round submission.

Following a near year long hiatus, he returned to fighting, returning to Babilon MMA on November 11, 2022, against Ivan Vulchin. Jabłoński won the fight via a second-round submission.

=== FEN Lightweight Championship bout ===
Following a two-year hiatus, Jabłoński returned to fighting making his debut under Fight Exclusive Night on November 23, 2024, facing Damian Rzepecki for the vacant FEN Lightweight Championship. Rzepecki won the fight via a third-round knockout, thus failing to win the championship in the process.

=== Return to regionals ===
Jabłoński made his debut under Sharks Attack MMA on May 10, 2025, against Robson Lima. Jabłoński won the fight via a second-round submission.

Jabłoński made his debut under King's Arena during their inaugural event on September 13, 2025, against Levan Kirtadze. Jabłoński lost the fight via a first-round knockout.

=== Ice Cage Fighting ===
Jabłoński made his debut under Finnish federation Ice Cage Fighting on May 16, 2026, against Aleksi Mäntykivi. Jabłoński won the fight via a Unanimous Decision.

== Mixed martial arts record ==
Professional record breakdown
19 matches	15 wins	4 losses
By knockout	0	4
By submission	8	0
By decision	7	0

Res.	Record	Opponent	Method	Event	Date	Round	Time	Location	Notes
Win	15–4	Lukas Cruz	Submission (arm triangle choke)	Fight Exclusive Night 63	September 25, 2026	3	1:24	Skarżysko-Kamienna, Poland	
Win	14–4	Aleksi Mäntykivi	Decision (unanimous)	Ice Cage Fighting 7	May 16, 2026	3	5:00	Tampere, Finland	Catchweight (165 lb) bout.
Loss	13–4	Levan Kirtadze	KO (punch)	King's Arena 1	September 13, 2025	1	2:01	Poznań, Poland	
Win	13–3	Robson Lima	Submission (arm triangle choke)	Sharks Attack 5	May 10, 2025	2	1:42	Ostróda, Poland	
Loss	12–3	Damian Rzepecki	KO (punch)	Fight Exclusive Night 57	November 23, 2024	3	4:13	Piotrków Trybunalski, Poland	For the vacant FEN Lightweight Championship.
Win	12–2	Ivan Vulchin	Submission (arm triangle choke)	Babilon MMA 32	November 11, 2022	2	4:42	Radom, Poland	
Win	11–2	Maxim Pashkov	Submission (arm triangle choke)	Professional League Storm 2	December 18, 2021	2	2:53	Poltava, Ukraine	
Win	10–2	Alan Langer	Submission (rear-naked choke)	Babilon MMA 22	May 22, 2021	3	1:10	Warsaw, Poland	
Win	9–2	Paata Tsxapelia	Decision (unanimous)	Babilon MMA 18	November 27, 2020	3	5:00	Warsaw, Poland	
Win	8–2	Adam Brzezowski	Decision (unanimous)	Babilon MMA 14	June 26, 2020	3	5:00	Radom, Poland	
Win	7–2	Kacper Bróździak	Submission (arm triangle choke)	Celtic Gladiator 26	December 13, 2019	1	4:43	Olsztyn, Poland	
Win	6–2	Aleksandr Grebnev	Decision (split)	Eagles FC 11	February 16, 2019	3	5:00	Chișinău, Moldova	
Win	5–2	Roberto Pastuch	Decision (unanimous)	Tosan Fight Night	September 15, 2018	3	5:00	Vienna, Austria	
Win	4–2	Gheorghe Panfilii	Decision (unanimous)	Eagles FC 8	February 10, 2018	3	5:00	Chișinău, Moldova	Return to Lightweight.
Loss	3–2	Armen Stepanyan	TKO (punches)	ACB 46	September 24, 2016	1	0:32	Olsztyn, Poland	Return to Featherweight.
Loss	3–1	Gracjan Szadziński	TKO (punches)	Xcage 9	April 9, 2016	1	4:43	Toruń, Poland	Return to Lightweight.
Win	3–0	Jakub Martys	Decision (unanimous)	Madness Cage Fighting 1	August 22, 2015	3	5:00	Puławy, Poland	Catchweight (150 lb) bout.
Win	2–0	Adrian Błoński	Submission (triangle choke)	PLMMA 53	March 28, 2015	1	1:47	Giżycko, Poland	Featherweight debut.
Win	1–0	Damian Zorczykowski	Submission (anaconda choke)	Champions MMA 1	November 14, 2014	1	1:12	Milicz, Poland	Lightweight debut.

== See also ==
- List of male mixed martial artists
