= Middleweight (MMA) =

MMA weight class

The middleweight division in mixed martial arts refers to different weight classes:

- The UFC's middleweight division, which groups competitors within 171 to 185 lb (77.5 to 84 kg)
- The Shooto's middleweight class, which refers to competitors between 155 and 170 lb (70.3 and 77.1 kg)
- The ONE Championship's middleweight division follows the Pride FC model, with an upper limit of 93 kg (205 lb)
- The Road FC's middleweight division, with an upper limit of 185 lb (84 kg)

== Ambiguity and clarification ==
For the sake of uniformity, many mixed martial arts websites refer to competitors between 171 and 185 lb (77.5 and 84 kg) as middleweights. This encompasses Shooto's light heavyweight division of the same weight limit.

The middleweight limit, as defined by the Nevada State Athletic Commission and the Association of Boxing Commissions is 185 lb (84 kg).

== Professional champions ==
=== Current champions ===
This table last updated in August 2025.

Active title reign

Organization	Reign Began	Champion	Record	Defenses
UFC	May 9, 2026	(United States) Sean Strickland	31–7 (12KO 4SUB)	0
PFL	July 19, 2025	(Netherlands) Costello van Steenis	18–3 (6KO 8SUB)	1
ONE Championship	N/A	Vacant	N/A	N/A
Fight Nights Global	September 9, 2020	(Russia) Vladimir Mineev	16–1–1 (9KO 3SUB)	0
KSW	June 3, 2023	(Poland) Paweł Pawlak	24–4–1 (11KO 3SUB)	2
Cage Warriors	April 2, 2022	(England) Christian Leroy Duncan	8–0 (6KO 1SUB)	1
ACA	April 9, 2021	(Russia) Magomedrasul Gasanov	18–2 (5KO 1SUB)	2
Road FC	July 3, 2021	(South Korea) In Su Hwang	6–1 (6KO 0SUB)	0
Ice Cage	May 16, 2026	(Portugal) André Fialho	17-9-0 (13KO 1SUB)	0
Legacy Fighting Alliance		(Brazil) Lucas Fernando	9–1 (5KO 2SUB)	0
URCC	January 7, 2017	(Philippines) Chris Hofmann	8–1 (7KO)	1

== See also ==
- List of current MMA Middleweight champions
- List of UFC Middleweight Champions
- List of Strikeforce Middleweight Champions
- List of Pancrase Middleweight Champions
- List of Road FC Middleweight Champions
