= Abdul Hussein (fighter) =

Finnish mixed martial artist (born 1997)

- Born: August 2, 1997 (age 29); Beirut, Lebanon
- Other names: Abba; King
- Height: 5 ft 7 in (1.70 m)
- Weight: 135 lb (61 kg; 9 st 9 lb)
- Division: Bantamweight; Flyweight
- Reach: 67 in (170 cm)
- Fighting out of: Espoo, Finland
- Team: Espoon Kehähait
- Years active: 2016-present

Mixed martial arts record
- Total: 18
- Wins: 16
- By knockout: 5
- By submission: 10
- By decision: 1
- Losses: 2
- By submission: 1
- By decision: 1

Other information
- Mixed martial arts record from Sherdog

Abdul Hussein (Arabic: عبد الحسين; born 2 August 1997) is a Finnish mixed martial artist who competes in the Bantamweight division of the Ultimate Fighting Championship. Before signing with the UFC in 2026, he competed in Brave CF, UAE Warriors and other regional promotions. Hussein is a former Ice Cage Fighting bantamweight champion.

== Early life ==
Hussein was born in a Palestinian refugee camp in Lebanon. When he was two months old, his family left Lebanon and travelled through Russia before settling in Finland.

He began training in martial arts after being introduced to the sport through his older brother.

== Mixed martial arts career ==
=== Amateur career ===
Hussein compiled an amateur record of 17 wins and 1 loss. After competing at featherweight early in his amateur career, he moved to the bantamweight division and won the 2015 European Amateur MMA Championship. The following year, he won the 2016 Amateur MMA World Championship. He also won multiple Finnish national titles before turning professional.

=== Early professional career ===
Hussein made his professional debut in 2016 with the Finnish promotion CAGE MMA Finland, defeating Adriano Andre Colazingari by second-round knockout at CAGE 37. He won his next three bouts in the promotion, all by first-round stoppage.

In 2018, Hussein signed with Brave CF. He lost his promotional debut to Nawras Abzakh by submission. He later defeated Sylvester Chipfumbu, John Cris Corton and Martin De Beer before losing a unanimous decision to Muhammad Mokaev in 2021.

After returning to competition in Finland in 2023, Hussein won submission victories over Ruslan Mammadov and Carlos Eduardo de Azevedo.

=== UAE Warriors ===
Hussein joined UAE Warriors in 2024. He defeated Mahmoud Abd El Raouf and Hansraj Samota in his first two appearances with the promotion.

In 2025, he defeated Eduardo Mora, Sami Yahia and Gift Walker.

=== Ice Cage Fighting ===
In December 2025, Hussein fought Tyson Nam for the inaugural Ice Cage Fighting bantamweight championship at ICE CAGE 6 in Espoo. He won the title by first-round knockout.

=== The Ultimate Fighter ===
In 2026, Hussein participated in the filming of The Ultimate Fighter. He was not selected by either team and did not compete during the season. Following the filming, he was linked with several potential UFC bouts before signing with the promotion later that year.

=== UFC ===
On June 2026, Hussein signed with the UFC. He was originally scheduled to make his promotional debut on July 25, 2026 against Muin Gafurov at UFC Fight Night 282, but Gafurov withdrew because of injury. Cody Gibson replaced Gafurov as Hussein's opponent. Hussein won the bout by third-round arm-triangle choke submission.

Hussein is scheduled to face Hecher Sosa at UFC Fight Night 295 on December 5, 2026.

== Boxing career ==
Alongside his mixed martial arts career, Hussein has competed in three professional boxing bouts, winning all three.

== Personal life ==
Hussein is in a relationship with Finnish kickboxer Emmi Saarela. They live in Espoo.

At the 2025 Espoo Sports Gala, Hussein was named Espoo Role Model of the Year.

== Championships and accomplishments ==
=== Mixed martial arts ===
- Ice Cage Fighting
  - ICF Bantamweight Champion (One time; First)

== Mixed martial arts record ==
Professional record breakdown
18 matches	16 wins	2 losses
By knockout	5	0
By submission	10	1
By decision	1	1

Res.	Record	Opponent	Method	Event	Date	Round	Time	Location	Notes
Win	16–2	Cody Gibson	Submission (arm-triangle choke)	UFC Fight Night: Ankalaev vs. Guskov	25 July 2026	3	3:07	Abu Dhabi, United Arab Emirates	
Win	15–2	Tyson Nam	KO (punch)	Ice Cage Fighting 6	26 December 2025	1	4:22	Espoo, Finland	Won the inaugural ICF Bantamweight Championship.
Win	14–2	Gift Walker	Submission (rear-naked choke)	UAE Warriors 64	22 October 2025	1	3:47	Abu Dhabi, United Arab Emirates	
Win	13-2	Sami Yahia	TKO (knees and punches)	UAE Warriors 59	12 June 2025	1	3:44	Abu Dhabi, United Arab Emirates	
Win	12–2	Eduardo Mora	Submission (bulldog choke)	UAE Warriors 58	22 February 2025	2	2:55	Al Ain, United Arab Emirates	
Win	11–2	Hansraj Samota	TKO (punches)	UAE Warriors 54	28 September 2024	2	4:25	Abu Dhabi, United Arab Emirates	
Win	10–2	Mahmoud Abd El Raouf	Technical Submission (rear-naked choke)	UAE Warriors 52	28 July 2024	1	3:40	Abu Dhabi, United Arab Emirates	
Win	9–2	Carlos Eduardo de Azevedo	Submission (arm-triangle choke)	Hamara MMA Vol. 4	11 December 2023	1	1:52	Turku, Finland	
Win	8–2	Ruslan Mammadov	Submission (rear-naked choke)	Carelia Fight 17	14 October 2023	1	4:44	Imatra, Finland	Catchweight (137 lb) bout.
Loss	7–2	Muhammad Mokaev	Decision (unanimous)	Brave CF 49	25 March 2021	3	5:00	Arad, Bahrain	Flyweight bout.
Win	7–1	Martin De Beer	Submission (guillotine choke)	Brave CF 31	12 July 2019	1	2:10	Durban, South Africa	Return to Bantamweight.
Win	6–1	John Cris Corton	Submission (guillotine choke)	Brave CF 22	15 March 2019	1	3:03	Pasay, Philippines	
Win	5–1	Sylvester Chipfumbu	Decision (unanimous)	Brave CF 19	8 December 2018	3	5:00	Sun City, South Africa	
Loss	4–1	Nawras Abzakh	Technical Submission (guillotine choke)	Brave CF 10	2 February 2018	1	1:30	Amman, Jordan	Bantamweight bout.
Win	4–0	Yari Orsini	TKO (elbows and punches)	CAGE 41	25 April 2017	1	4:37	Helsinki, Finland	
Win	3–0	Ilkhom Aliev	Submission (guillotine choke)	CAGE 40	9 September 2017	1	3:28	Helsinki, Finland	Flyweight debut.
Win	2-0	Stefan Serghei	Submission (rear-naked choke)	CAGE 38	18 February 2017	3	5:00	Helsinki, Finland	Catchweight (129 lb) bout.
Win	1–0	Adriano Andre Colazingari	TKO (punches)	CAGE 37	26 November 2016	2	1:11	Helsinki, Finland	Bantamweight debut.

== See also ==
- List of current UFC fighters
- List of male mixed martial artists
