= Cody Gibson =

American mixed martial arts fighter

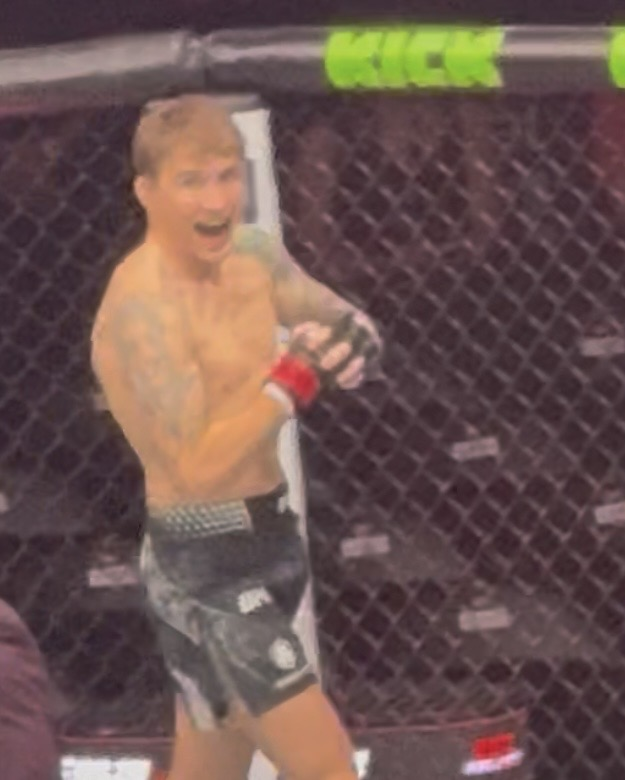
- Born: September 11, 1987 (age 39); Blackwell, Oklahoma, U.S.
- Other names: The Renegade
- Height: 5 ft 10 in (1.78 m)
- Weight: 135 lb (61 kg; 9.6 st)
- Division: Featherweight; Bantamweight; Flyweight
- Reach: 71 in (180 cm)
- Fighting out of: San Luis Obispo, California, United States
- Team: The Pit (2020–present)
- Rank: Brown belt in Brazilian Jiu-Jitsu
- Years active: 2008–2017, 2018–present

Mixed martial arts record
- Total: 34
- Wins: 21
- By knockout: 7
- By submission: 5
- By decision: 9
- Losses: 13
- By knockout: 1
- By submission: 6
- By decision: 6

Other information
- University: Bakersfield College; Menlo College
- Mixed martial arts record from Sherdog

Cody Gibson (born September 11, 1987) is an American mixed martial artist who competed in the Bantamweight division in the Ultimate Fighting Championship (UFC).

== Background ==
Born in Blackwell, Oklahoma, in 1987, Gibson and his brother Keith were adopted in 1989 and moved west, settling in Visalia, California. As an adult, Gibson found out through social media that he also has a sister and met his biological parents for the first time in 2018.

== Mixed martial arts career ==
=== Regional circuit ===
While home for the summer during college, a friend of Cody's invited him to a mixed martial arts gym in Exeter, California, to give it a try. He quickly found out that he enjoyed fighting and took his first professional fight only a few weeks after beginning training. Over the next two years, Cody, still wrestling in college, would take a total of three professional fights, despite not having been trained extensively in any discipline other than wrestling. Still, he managed to begin his MMA career with a 3–0 start. After graduating from college, Cody had a lot of regrets about not meeting his potential as a college wrestler. Upon moving back to Visalia, California, he found a local gym called Elite Team Visalia under head coach, judo and jiu-jitsu black belt Tom Knox. Over the next several years, Cody fought on the local circuit while learning the arts of Brazilian jiu-jitsu, Muay Thai, and boxing. He fought on shows such as Porterville, California's The Warriors Cage, Lemoore, California's Tachi Palace Fights, and made appearances for Nick Diaz's foray into promoting show called WAR MMA as well as for AXSTV's Titan Fighting Championship.

=== Ultimate Fighting Championship ===
In February 2014, riding a six-fight win streak, Gibson was signed by the UFC as a short-notice replacement to fight fellow newcomer Aljamain Sterling on February 22, 2014, at UFC 170. Gibson lost the fight via unanimous decision.

Gibson faced Johnny Bedford on June 28, 2014, at UFC Fight Night 44, replacing an injured Rani Yahya. Gibson won the fight via TKO 38 seconds into the first round.

Gibson faced Manvel Gamburyan on September 27, 2014, at UFC 178. Gibson lost the fight via submission in the second round

Gibson faced Douglas Silva de Andrade on February 22, 2015, at UFC Fight Night 61. He lost the fight by unanimous decision and was subsequently released from the promotion.

=== Post-UFC career ===
On May 18, 2017, Gibson vacated his Bantamweight title and moved up a weight class to fight Adrian Diaz for the TPF Featherweight Championship. He lost the fight via third round submission and retired afterwards.

Gibson signed to participate in the Featherweight division of 2019 Professional Fighters League season. However, Gibson was sidelined with bicep and shoulder surgery and was not able to compete.

=== XMMA ===
Gibson was scheduled to face John Dodson on July 30, 2021, at XMMA 2. Dodson unfortunately pulled out of the fight due to being involved in a car accident. Canadian prospect Louie Sanoudakis took his place. Gibson won the fight by knock out in just 44 seconds.

The bout with Dodson was rescheduled to take place at XMMA 3 on October 23, 2021. Gibson won the fight by unanimous decision.

Gibson faced Ray Borg on January 28, 2022, at Eagle FC 44: Spong vs. Kharitonov. He lost the bout via unanimous decision.

Gibson faced fellow UFC veteran Francisco Rivera on November 19, 2022, at Up Next Fighting 3: Rivera vs. Gibson. He won the bout via third-round submission with an arm triangle choke to become the inaugural Up Next Fighting Bantamweight Champion.

=== The Ultimate Fighter 31 ===
In mid-March 2023, it was announced that Gibson would be competing in the thirty-first season of The Ultimate Fighter 31.

In the quarterfinal Gibson faced Mando Gutierrez, and won the fight via TKO in the first round.

In the semi-final, Gibson faced Rico DiSciullo, and won the fight via submission in the first round.

Gibson faced The Ultimate Fighter Season 27 winner Brad Katona in the tournament final on August 19, 2023, at UFC 292. He lost the fight via unanimous decision. The bout won the Fight of the Night award.

=== Return to UFC ===
Gibson was scheduled to face Davey Grant on March 23, 2024, at UFC on ESPN 53. However, Grant withdrew due to injury and was replaced by Miles Johns. Gibson lost the bout by unanimous decision.

Gibson faced Brian Kelleher on July 20, 2024, at UFC on ESPN 60. He won the fight by an arm-triangle choke submission in the first round.

Gibson faced Chad Anheliger on November 2, 2024, at UFC Fight Night 246. He won the fight by unanimous decision.

Gibson faced Da'Mon Blackshear on March 15, 2025, at UFC Fight Night 254. He lost the fight via a kimura submission in the second round.

Gibson faced Aori Qileng on October 18, 2025, at UFC Fight Night 262. He lost the fight by technical knockout 21 seconds into the first round.

Replacing Muin Gafurov on short notice, Gibson faced promotional newcomer Abdul Hussein on July 25, 2026 at UFC Fight Night 282. He lost the fight via an arm-triangle choke in round three.

On August 12, 2026, it was reported that Gibson was once again removed from the UFC roster.

== Personal life ==
Aside from fighting, Gibson was a U.S. History and economics teacher and is now a middle school physical education teacher.

He has two daughters.

== Championships and accomplishments ==
=== Mixed martial arts ===
- Ultimate Fighting Championship
  - The Ultimate Fighter 31 (Runner-up)
  - Fight of the Night (One time) vs. Brad Katona
- Tachi Palace Fights
  - TPF Bantamweight Championship (one time)
    - One successful title defense
- Up Next Fighting
  - UNF Bantamweight Champion (one time; first)

== Mixed martial arts record ==
Professional record breakdown
34 matches	21 wins	13 losses
By knockout	7	1
By submission	5	6
By decision	9	6

Res.	Record	Opponent	Method	Event	Date	Round	Time	Location	Notes
Loss	21–13	Abdul Hussein	Submission (arm-triangle choke)	UFC Fight Night: Ankalaev vs. Guskov	July 25, 2026	3	3:07	Abu Dhabi, United Arab Emirates	
Loss	21–12	Aori Qileng	TKO (punches)	UFC Fight Night: de Ridder vs. Allen	October 18, 2025	1	0:21	Vancouver, British Columbia, Canada	
Loss	21–11	Da'Mon Blackshear	Submission (kimura)	UFC Fight Night: Vettori vs. Dolidze 2	March 15, 2025	2	4:09	Las Vegas, Nevada, United States	
Win	21–10	Chad Anheliger	Decision (unanimous)	UFC Fight Night: Moreno vs. Albazi	November 2, 2024	3	5:00	Edmonton, Alberta, Canada	
Win	20–10	Brian Kelleher	Submission (arm-triangle choke)	UFC on ESPN: Lemos vs. Jandiroba	July 20, 2024	1	3:58	Las Vegas, Nevada, United States	
Loss	19–10	Miles Johns	Decision (unanimous)	UFC on ESPN: Ribas vs. Namajunas	March 23, 2024	3	5:00	Las Vegas, Nevada, United States	
Loss	19–9	Brad Katona	Decision (unanimous)	UFC 292	August 19, 2023	3	5:00	Boston, Massachusetts, United States	The Ultimate Fighter 31 Bantamweight Tournament Final. Fight of the Night.
Win	19–8	Francisco Rivera	Submission (arm-triangle choke)	Up Next Fighting 3	November 19, 2022	3	2:42	Commerce, California, United States	Won the inaugural UNF Bantamweight Championship.
Loss	18–8	Ray Borg	Decision (unanimous)	Eagle FC 44	January 28, 2022	3	5:00	Miami, Florida, United States	
Win	18–7	John Dodson	Decision (unanimous)	XMMA 3	October 23, 2021	3	5:00	Miami, Florida, United States	
Win	17–7	Louie Sanoudakis	KO (punches)	XMMA 2	July 30, 2021	1	0:44	Greenville, South Carolina, United States	
Win	16–7	Gustavo Erak	Decision (unanimous)	LFA 51	September 28, 2018	3	5:00	Fresno, California, United States	
Loss	15–7	Adrian Diaz	Submission (guillotine choke)	Tachi Palace Fights 31	May 18, 2017	3	1:46	Lemoore, California, United States	For the TPF Featherweight Championship.
Win	15–6	Kyle Reyes	KO (punches)	Tachi Palace Fights 29	November 3, 2016	2	0:21	Lemoore, California, United States	Defended the TPF Bantamweight Championship.
Win	14–6	Rolando Velasco	Decision (unanimous)	Tachi Palace Fights 27	May 19, 2016	5	5:00	Lemoore, California, United States	Won the TPF Bantamweight Championship.
Win	13–6	Justin Linn	Decision (unanimous)	The Warriors Cage 24	April 1, 2016	3	5:00	Porterville, California, United States	
Loss	12–6	Douglas Silva de Andrade	Decision (unanimous)	UFC Fight Night: Bigfoot vs. Mir	February 22, 2015	3	5:00	Porto Alegre, Brazil	
Loss	12–5	Manvel Gamburyan	Submission (guillotine choke)	UFC 178	September 27, 2014	2	4:56	Las Vegas, Nevada, United States	
Win	12–4	Johnny Bedford	TKO (punch)	UFC Fight Night: Swanson vs. Stephens	June 28, 2014	1	0:38	San Antonio, Texas, United States	
Loss	11–4	Aljamain Sterling	Decision (unanimous)	UFC 170	February 22, 2014	3	5:00	Las Vegas, Nevada, United States	
Win	11–3	Evan Esguerra	Decision (unanimous)	Tachi Palace Fights 17	November 14, 2013	3	5:00	Lemoore, California, United States	
Win	10–3	Chad George	Submission (guillotine choke)	The Warriors Cage 18	October 25, 2013	1	4:37	Porterville, California, United States	Catchweight (140 lb) bout.
Win	9–3	Darin Cooley	TKO (punches and knee)	WAR MMA 1	June 22, 2013	3	3:46	Stockton, California, United States	
Win	8–3	Junior Villanueva	Submission (rear-naked choke)	The Warriors Cage 16	January 25, 2013	2	3:30	Porterville, California, United States	
Win	7–3	Andrew Whitney	Decision (unanimous)	Titan FC 24	August 24, 2012	3	5:00	Kansas City, Kansas, United States	Return to Bantamweight.
Win	6–3	Justin Santistevan	Submission (guillotine choke)	EFWC: The Untamed 2	March 30, 2012	1	1:03	Anaheim, California, United States	Flyweight debut.
Loss	5–3	Casey Olson	Decision (unanimous)	Tachi Palace Fights 12	March 9, 2012	3	5:00	Lemoore, California, United States	
Loss	5–2	Ulysses Gomez	Submission (guillotine choke)	Tachi Palace Fights 11	December 2, 2011	3	2:43	Lemoore, California, United States	For the vacant TPF Bantamweight Championship.
Win	5–1	Walel Watson	TKO (punches and elbows)	Tachi Palace Fights 9	May 6, 2011	2	4:09	Lemoore, California, United States	Return to Bantamweight.
Win	4–1	Art Becerra	Decision (unanimous)	The Warriors Cage 10	January 21, 2011	3	5:00	Porterville, California, United States	
Loss	3–1	David Bollea	Submission (armlock)	Tachi Palace Fights 5	July 9, 2010	2	0:31	Lemoore, California, United States	
Win	3–0	Ray Cervera	Decision (unanimous)	Tachi Palace Fights 2	December 3, 2009	3	5:00	Lemoore, California, United States	Featherweight debut.
Win	2–0	Dustin Rocha	TKO (punches)	Tachi Palace Fights: Best of Both Worlds	July 16, 2009	2	0:48	Lemoore, California, United States	
Win	1–0	Billy Terry	TKO (punches)	Gladiator Challenge 81	July 27, 2008	1	1:58	Porterville, California, United States	Bantamweight debut.

== Mixed martial arts exhibition record ==
Exhibition record breakdown		
2 matches	2 wins	0 losses
By knockout	1	0
By submission	1	0

Res.	Record	Opponent	Method	Event	Date	Round	Time	Location	Notes
Win	2–0	Rico DiSciullo	Submission (arm-triangle choke)	The Ultimate Fighter: Team McGregor vs. Team Chandler	Aug 15, 2023 (airdate)	1	4:32	Las Vegas, Nevada, United States	The Ultimate Fighter 31 Semi-final round.
Win	1–0	Mando Gutierrez	TKO (flying knee and punches)	The Ultimate Fighter: Team McGregor vs. Team Chandler	Jun 6, 2023 (airdate)	1	3:24	Las Vegas, Nevada, United States	The Ultimate Fighter 31 Quarterfinal round.

== See also ==
- List of male mixed martial artists
