= UFC Fight Night: Moreno vs. Albazi =

Mixed martial arts event in 2024

- The poster for UFC Fight Night: Moreno vs. Albazi
- Promotion: Ultimate Fighting Championship
- Date: November 2, 2024
- Venue: Rogers Place
- City: Edmonton, Alberta, Canada
- Attendance: 16,439
- Total gate: $2,600,463

Event chronology
| UFC 308: Topuria vs. Holloway | UFC Fight Night: Moreno vs. Albazi | UFC Fight Night: Magny vs. Prates |

UFC Fight Night: Moreno vs. Albazi (also known as UFC Fight Night 246 and UFC on ESPN+ 104) was a mixed martial arts event produced by the Ultimate Fighting Championship that took place on November 2, 2024, at Rogers Place in Edmonton, Alberta, Canada.

== Background ==
The event marked the promotion's third visit to Edmonton and first since UFC 240 in July 2019.

This event was the first to implement changes to the Unified Rules of Mixed Martial Arts approved by the Association of Boxing Commissions in July which removed the ban of 12–6 elbow strikes and deemed a fighter shall be considered grounded and may not be legally kneed or kicked to the head when any part of their body other than their hands or feet is in contact with the ground (canvas).

A flyweight bout between former two-time UFC Flyweight Champion Brandon Moreno and Amir Albazi headlined the event. The bout was initially scheduled for UFC Fight Night: Magny vs. Prates, but was moved to this event shortly after. They were previously expected to meet at UFC Fight Night: Moreno vs. Royval 2 earlier in the year but Albazi withdrew due to a neck injury.

A women's flyweight bout between Erin Blanchfield and former two-time UFC Women's Strawweight Champion Rose Namajunas was originally scheduled to headline the event. However, in September, it was announced that the bout was shifted to the co-main event but remained five rounds.

A heavyweight bout between former UFC Heavyweight Championship challenger Derrick Lewis and Alexander Romanov was expected to serve as the co-main event. However, the promotion opted to split the pairing, with Lewis facing Jhonata Diniz and Romanov facing Rodrigo Nascimento instead. After the weigh-ins, Lewis was forced to withdraw from the fight due to non-weight cut related medical issues, so his bout against Diniz was scrapped.

== Results ==
Main card (ESPN+)
| Weight class | | | | Method | Round | Time | Notes |
|---|---|---|---|---|---|---|---|
| Flyweight | Brandon Moreno | def. | Amir Albazi | Decision (unanimous) (49–46, 50–45, 50–45) | 5 | 5:00 |
| Women's Flyweight | Erin Blanchfield | def. | Rose Namajunas | Decision (unanimous) (48–47, 48–47, 48–47) | 5 | 5:00 |
| Light Heavyweight | Brendson Ribeiro | def. | Caio Machado | Decision (split) (29–28, 28–29, 29–28) | 3 | 5:00 |
| Women's Flyweight | Jasmine Jasudavicius | def. | Ariane da Silva | Submission (brabo choke) | 3 | 2:28 |
| Middleweight | Dustin Stoltzfus | def. | Marc-André Barriault | KO (punches) | 1 | 4:28 |
| Welterweight | Mike Malott | def. | Trevin Giles | Decision (unanimous) (30–27, 29–28, 29–28) | 3 | 5:00 |
Preliminary card (ESPN+)
| Bantamweight | Aiemann Zahabi | def. | Pedro Munhoz | Decision (unanimous) (30–27, 29–28, 29–28) | 3 | 5:00 |
| Bantamweight | Charles Jourdain | def. | Victor Henry | Submission (guillotine choke) | 2 | 3:43 |
| Featherweight | Youssef Zalal | def. | Jack Shore | Submission (arm-triangle choke) | 2 | 0:59 |
| Heavyweight | Alexander Romanov | def. | Rodrigo Nascimento | Decision (unanimous) (30–27, 30–27, 30–27) | 3 | 5:00 |
| Bantamweight | Serhiy Sidey | def. | Garrett Armfield | Decision (split) (28–29, 29–28, 29–28) | 3 | 5:00 |
| Bantamweight | Cody Gibson | def. | Chad Anheliger | Decision (unanimous) (30–27, 30–27, 30–26) | 3 | 5:00 |
| Women's Flyweight | Jamey-Lyn Horth | def. | Ivana Petrović | Decision (split) (30–27, 28–29, 29–28) | 3 | 5:00 |

== Bonus awards ==
The following fighters received $50,000 bonuses.

- Fight of the Night: No bonus awarded.
- Performance of the Night: Jasmine Jasudavicius, Dustin Stoltzfus, Charles Jourdain, and Youssef Zalal

== See also ==
- 2024 in UFC
- List of current UFC fighters
- List of UFC events
