= Damian Rzepecki =

Polish mixed martial artist (born 2001)

- Born: November 23, 2001 (age 24); Piotrków Trybunalski, Poland
- Other names: The Butcher
- Height: 5 ft 10 in (1.78 m)
- Weight: 155 lb (70 kg; 11 st 1 lb)
- Division: Lightweight (2022–present)
- Reach: 73.6 in (187 cm)
- Stance: Orthodox
- Fighting out of: Piotrków Trybunalski, Poland
- Team: Top Fit Center Piotrków Trybunalski; Octopus Łódź
- Years active: 2021–present

Mixed martial arts record
- Total: 11
- Wins: 10
- By knockout: 4
- By submission: 5
- By decision: 1
- Losses: 1
- By decision: 1

Other information
- Mixed martial arts record from Sherdog

Damian Rzepecki (born November 23, 2001) is a Polish professional mixed martial artist. He currently competes in the Lightweight division of the Ultimate Fighting Championship (UFC). He is the former FEN Lightweight Champion.

== Professional career ==
=== Early career ===
Rzepecki made his professional debut on December 4, 2021 against Dawid Gabara. Rzepecki won the fight via a first-round submission.

His next fight came on March 12, 2022 against Vladislav Bilorus. Rzepecki won the fight via a third-round TKO.

=== Fight Exclusive Night ===
Rzepecki made his debut under Fight Exclusive Night on August 27, 2022 against Hubert Sulewski. Rzepecki won the fight via a second-round submission. This performance earned him a Submission of the Night bonus.

His next fight came on March 11, 2023 against Konrad Furmanek. Rzepecki won the fight via a second-round submission. This performance earned him his second Submission of the Night bonus.

His next fight came on May 27, 2023 against Krzysztof Dobrzyński. Rzepecki won the fight via a second-round submission. This performance earned him his third Submission of the Night bonus in a row.

His next fight came on October 14, 2023 against Estabili Amato. Rzepecki won the fight via a second-round submission.

His next fight came on March 16, 2024 against Giorgi Esiava. Rzepecki won the fight via a third-round knockout.

==== FEN Lightweight Champion ====
On November 23, 2024, Rzepecki faced Marcin Jabłoński for the vacant FEN Lightweight Championship. Rzepecki won the fight via a third-round knockout, and thus won his first career championship.

His first title defense came on June 21, 2025 against Patryk Duński. Rzepecki won the fight via a second-round TKO, and thus successfully retaining his championship.

=== The Way of Warriors FC ===
Following a ten-month hiatus, Rzepecki returned to the cage on April 11, 2026, debuting under Spanish promotion The Way of Warriors FC (WOW) against Corneliu Rotaru Lascar. Rzepecki won the fight via a Unanimous Decision. This performance earned him his first career Fight of the Night bonus.

=== Ultimate Fighting Championship ===
On June 29, 2026, it was announced that Rzepecki had signed with the Ultimate Fighting Championship (UFC).

Rzepecki made his UFC debut against promotional newcomer Magomed Zaynukov on July 25, 2026, at UFC Fight Night 282. He lost the fight by unanimous decision.

== Championships and accomplishments ==
=== Mixed martial arts ===
- Fight Exclusive Night
  - FEN Lightweight Championship (One time; current)
    - One successful title defense
  - Submission of the Night (Three times)
- The Way of Warriors FC
  - Fight of the Night (One time)

== Mixed martial arts record ==
Professional record breakdown
11 matches	10 wins	1 loss
By knockout	4	0
By submission	5	0
By decision	1	1

Res.	Record	Opponent	Method	Event	Date	Round	Time	Location	Notes
Loss	10–1	Magomed Zaynukov	Decision (unanimous)	UFC Fight Night: Ankalaev vs. Guskov	July 25, 2026	3	5:00	Abu Dhabi, United Arab Emirates	
Win	10–0	Corneliu Rotaru Lascar	Decision (unanimous)	WOW 29	April 11, 2026	3	5:00	Valencia, Spain	Fight of the Night.
Win	9–0	Patryk Duński	KO (punch to the body)	Fight Exclusive Night 59	June 21, 2025	2	2:42	Lubin, Poland	Defended the FEN Lightweight Championship.
Win	8–0	Marcin Jabłoński	KO (punch)	Fight Exclusive Night 57	November 23, 2024	3	4:13	Piotrków Trybunalski, Poland	Won the vacant FEN Lightweight Championship.
Win	7–0	Giorgi Esiava	KO (knee)	Fight Exclusive Night 53	March 16, 2024	3	4:16	Lubin, Poland	
Win	6–0	Estabili Amato	Submission (rear-naked choke)	Fight Exclusive Night 51	October 14, 2023	2	4:52	Lubin, Poland	
Win	5–0	Krzysztof Dobrzyński	Submission (Japanese necktie)	Fight Exclusive Night 46	May 27, 2023	2	3:14	Piła, Poland	Submission of the Night.
Win	4–0	Konrad Furmanek	Submission (rear-naked choke)	Fight Exclusive Night 45	March 11, 2023	2	4:12	Ząbki, Poland	Submission of the Night.
Win	3–0	Hubert Sulewski	Submission (rear-naked choke)	Fight Exclusive Night 41	August 27, 2022	2	4:57	Mrągowo, Poland	Submission of the Night.
Win	2–0	Vladislav Bilorus	TKO (punches)	Anaconda Fight League 2	March 12, 2022	3	1:01	Rzgów, Poland	Lightweight debut.
Win	1–0	Dawid Gabara	Submission (rear-naked choke)	Anaconda Fight League 1	December 4, 2021	1	4:57	Rzgów, Poland	Catchweight (150 lb) bout.

== See also ==
- List of current UFC fighters
- List of male mixed martial artists
