= Rizvan Kuniev =

Russian mixed martial artist (born 1992)

- Born: Rizvan Magomedovich Kuniev; March 10, 1992 (age 34); Dagestan, Russia
- Height: 6 ft 4 in (1.93 m)
- Weight: 265 lb (120 kg; 18 st 13 lb)
- Division: Heavyweight
- Reach: 76 in (190 cm)
- Stance: Orthodox
- Fighting out of: Makhachkala, Russia
- Team: Gorets FT
- Years active: 2011–present

Mixed martial arts record
- Total: 20
- Wins: 14
- By knockout: 7
- By submission: 2
- By decision: 5
- Losses: 4
- By decision: 4
- Draws: 1
- No contests: 1

Other information
- Mixed martial arts record from Sherdog

Rizvan Magomedovich Kuniev (born March 10, 1992) is a Russian professional mixed martial artist competing in the Heavyweight division of the Ultimate Fighting Championship (UFC). As of November 7, 2026, he is #6 in the Meta UFC heavyweight rankings.

== Mixed martial arts career ==
=== Early career ===
Kuniev would start his career on a 9–2–1 run with his only losses coming to Darko Stošić and Justin Willis.

Kuniev would then compete for the Eagle FC Heavyweight title against Vladimir Dainenko at Eagle FC 31 winning the fight by corner stoppage.

Kuniev then made his Contender Series debut against Edivan Santos on September 28, 2021. He won via third round stoppage, but didn't get a contract with the UFC

After competing on Contender Series, Kuniev would defend his Eagle FC Heavyweight title against UFC veteran Anthony Hamilton at Eagle FC 46 on March 11, 2022. He would win the fight via guillotine choke in the first round.

Kuniev would then sign for the Professional Fighters League for their 2023 season. Kuniev started by going up against Renan Ferreira on April 7, 2023, at PFL 2. Kuniev initially won the fight by unanimous decision, but the result was changed to a no contest when he failed a drug test.

=== Dana White's Contender Series ===
Kuniev was then booked to compete on Week 2 of Season 8 of Dana White's Contender Series on August 20, 2024, against Hugo Cunha. He won the fight via first round knockout and was awarded a contract by Dana White.

=== Ultimate Fighting Championship ===
Kuniev was scheduled to make his UFC debut against Curtis Blaydes on February 22, 2025 at UFC Fight Night 252. However, the bout was moved to March 8, 2025 at UFC 313 for unknown reasons. A few hours before the event took place, Blaydes withdrew due to an undisclosed illness and the bout was scrapped. The bout was rescheduled for May 17, 2025 at UFC Fight Night 256. In turn, the bout was moved once again and eventually took place on June 21, 2025 at UFC on ABC 8. Kuniev lost the fight by split decision. 11 out of 13 media sources scored the fight in favor of Kuniev.

Kuniev was scheduled to face Ryan Spann on February 7, 2026 at UFC Fight Night 266. However, Spann withdrew for undisclosed reasons and was replaced by Jailton Almeida. Kuniev won the fight by unanimous decision.

Kuniev was scheduled to face Tyrell Fortune on June 27, 2026, at UFC Fight Night 280. However, for undisclosed reasons, the bout was moved to July 25, 2026 and took place at UFC Fight Night 282. Kuniev won the fight by technical knockout via knees in the second round. This fight earned him a $100,000 Fight of the Night award.

Kuniev faced Alexander Volkov on October 24, 2026 at UFC 333. He lost the fight by unanimous decision.

== Championships and accomplishments ==
=== Mixed martial arts ===
- Ultimate Fighting Championship
  - Fight of the Night (One time) vs. Tyrell Fortune

== Mixed martial arts record ==
Professional record breakdown
20 matches	14 wins	4 losses
By knockout	7	0
By submission	2	0
By decision	5	4
Draws	1	
No contests	1	

Res.	Record	Opponent	Method	Event	Date	Round	Time	Location	Notes
Loss	14–4–1 (1)	Alexander Volkov	Decision (unanimous)	UFC 333	October 24, 2026	3	5:00	Abu Dhabi, United Arab Emirates	
Win	14–3–1 (1)	Tyrell Fortune	TKO (knees)	UFC Fight Night: Ankalaev vs. Guskov	July 25, 2026	3	1:11	Abu Dhabi, United Arab Emirates	Fight of the Night.
Win	13–3–1 (1)	Jailton Almeida	Decision (unanimous)	UFC Fight Night: Bautista vs. Oliveira	February 7, 2026	3	5:00	Las Vegas, Nevada, United States	
Loss	12–3–1 (1)	Curtis Blaydes	Decision (split)	UFC on ABC: Hill vs. Rountree Jr.	June 21, 2025	3	5:00	Baku, Azerbaijan	
Win	12–2–1 (1)	Hugo Cunha	TKO (knee to the body and punches)	Dana White's Contender Series 68	August 20, 2024	1	4:59	Las Vegas, Nevada, United States	
NC	11–2–1 (1)	Renan Ferreira	NC (overturned)	PFL 2 (2023)	April 7, 2023	3	5:00	Las Vegas, Nevada, United States	Originally a unanimous decision win for Kuniev; overturned after he tested positive for banned substances.
Win	11–2–1	Anthony Hamilton	Submission (guillotine choke)	Eagle FC 46	March 11, 2022	1	1:17	Miami, Florida, United States	Defended the Eagle FC Heavyweight Championship.
Win	10–2–1	Edivan Mineiro Santos	TKO (punches)	Dana White's Contender Series 41	September 28, 2021	3	1:00	Las Vegas, Nevada, United States	
Win	9–2–1	Vladimir Daineko	TKO (corner stoppage)	Eagle FC 31	December 19, 2020	3	5:00	Nizhny Novgorod, Russia	Defended the Eagle FC Heavyweight Championship.
Win	8–2–1	Ruud Vernooij	Decision (unanimous)	Eagles FC: Next Level	February 15, 2020	3	5:00	Ciorescu, Moldova	
Win	7–2–1	Shamil Abasov	TKO (punches)	Gorilla Fighting 16	August 30, 2019	3	4:53	Astrakhan, Russia	Won the GF Heavyweight Championship.
Win	6–2–1	Navid Yadegari	Submission (rear-naked choke)	Gorets FC: For the Prizes of V. Zolotov	July 6, 2019	1	2:00	Kaspiysk, Russia	
Win	5–2–1	José Agustin Jimenez	TKO (punches)	UMC 1	June 2, 2018	1	2:35	Monza, Italy	
Win	4–2–1	Konstantin Andreitsev	Decision (unanimous)	ProFC 64	December 24, 2017	3	5:00	Rostov-on-Don, Russia	2017 ProFC Heavyweight Grand Prix Semifinal.
Win	3–2–1	Charles Andrade	Decision (unanimous)	ProFC 63	September 10, 2017	3	5:00	Rostov-on-Don, Russia	2017 ProFC Heavyweight Grand Prix Quarterfinal.
Loss	2–2–1	Justin Willis	Decision (majority)	Inoki Genome Fight 4	August 29, 2015	2	5:00	Tokyo, Japan	
Loss	2–1–1	Darko Stošić	Decision (unanimous)	Tesla FC 4	June 14, 2014	3	5:00	Pančevo, Serbia	
Win	2–0–1	Mikhail Istomin	TKO (punches)	Voronezh MMA Federation: Mixfight Cup 2012	January 20, 2012	2	N/A	Voronezh, Russia	
Draw	1–0–1	Ivan Gayvanovich	Draw (unanimous)	World MMA Federation: WMAC 2011 Finals	October 9, 2011	2	5:00	Yalta, Ukraine	
Win	1–0	Anatoli Ciumac	Decision (unanimous)	World MMA Federation: WMAC 2011 Semifinals	October 8, 2011	2	5:00	Yalta, Ukraine	Heavyweight debut.

== See also ==
- List of current UFC fighters
- List of Dana White's Contender Series alumni
- List of male mixed martial artists
