= UFC Fight Night: Ankalaev vs. Guskov =

Mixed martial arts event in 2026

- The poster for UFC Fight Night: Ankalaev vs. Guskov
- Promotion: Ultimate Fighting Championship
- Date: July 25, 2026
- Venue: Etihad Arena
- City: Abu Dhabi, United Arab Emirates
- Attendance: Not announced

Event chronology
UFC Fight Night: du Plessis vs. Usman	UFC Fight Night: Ankalaev vs. Guskov	UFC Fight Night: Medić vs. Rodriguez

UFC Fight Night: Ankalaev vs. Guskov (also known as UFC Fight Night 282) was a mixed martial arts event produced by the Ultimate Fighting Championship that took place on July 25, 2026, at the Etihad Arena in Abu Dhabi, United Arab Emirates.

== Background ==
The event marked the promotion's 23rd visit to Abu Dhabi and first since UFC 321 in October 2025.

A light heavyweight bout between former UFC Light Heavyweight Champion Magomed Ankalaev and former title challenger Khalil Rountree Jr. was scheduled to headline the event. However, less than two weeks before the event, Rountree withdrew due to an injury and was replaced by Bogdan Guskov, who was originally scheduled to compete one week later at UFC Fight Night: Medić vs. Rodriguez. Former KSW and UFC Light Heavyweight Champion Jan Błachowicz, who was the opponent for Guskov the following week, was originally asked to step in on short notice but said he was not able to make the weight limit one week prior to his scheduled bout.

A heavyweight bout between Rizvan Kuniev and Tyrell Fortune took place at the event. The bout was originally scheduled to take place one month earlier at UFC Fight Night: Fiziev vs. Torres but was moved to this card for undisclosed reasons.

A heavyweight bout between Louie Sutherland and Gökhan Saricam was scheduled for the event. However, it was reported that Sutherland was instead scheduled to face another opponent at UFC Fight Night: Gamrot vs. Salkilld two weeks later.

Promotional newcomers Magomedrasul Gasanov and Abubakar Vagaev were scheduled to meet in a middleweight bout at this event. However, Gasanov pulled out for unknown reasons and was replaced by Saygid Izagakhmaev, with the matchup subsequently being shifted to a welterweight contest.

A bantamweight bout between former UFC Bantamweight Championship challenger Umar Nurmagomedov and David Martínez was scheduled for the event. However, Martínez withdrew from the bout due to an injury, so the bout was cancelled.

A light heavyweight bout between Dustin Jacoby and former LFA Light Heavyweight Champion Uran Satybaldiev was scheduled for the event. However, Satybaldiev withdrew for undisclosed reasons and was replaced by undefeated promotional newcomer Muhammad Saidov.

A bantamweight bout between former LFA Bantamweight Champion Muin Gafurov and promotional newcomer Abdul Hussein was scheduled for the event. However, Gafurov withdrew due to a leg injury and was replaced by Cody Gibson.

A welterweight bout between Islam Dulatov and Wellington Turman was scheduled for the event. However just hours before it took place, Dulatov withdrew due to illness and the matchup was cancelled.

== Results ==
Main card (Paramount+)
Weight class				Method	Round	Time	Notes
Light Heavyweight	Magomed Ankalaev	def.	Bogdan Guskov	TKO (punches)	5	2:41
Flyweight	Ramazan Temirov	def.	Steve Erceg	KO (punch)	1	4:21
Lightweight	Magomed Zaynukov	def.	Damian Rzepecki	Decision (unanimous) (30–27, 30–27, 30–27)	3	5:00
Heavyweight	Rizvan Kuniev	def.	Tyrell Fortune	TKO (knees)	3	1:12
Welterweight	Abubakar Vagaev	def.	Saygid Izagakhmaev	Decision (unanimous) (29–28, 29–28, 29–28)	3	5:00
Preliminary card (Paramount+)
Heavyweight	Valter Walker	def.	Thomas Petersen	Submission (calf slicer)	1	1:32
Light Heavyweight	Muhammad Saidov	def.	Dustin Jacoby	TKO (head kick and punches)	2	4:49
Welterweight	Sam Patterson	def.	Santiago Ponzinibbio	TKO (punches)	2	3:06
Lightweight	Axel Sola	def.	Ismael Bonfim	Submission (brabo choke)	1	4:44
Light Heavyweight	Magomed Tuchalov	def.	Brendson Ribeiro	Decision (unanimous) (29–28, 29–28, 29–28)	3	5:00
Lightweight	Nurullo Aliev	def.	Mike Davis	Decision (unanimous) (30–27, 30–27, 30–27)	3	5:00
Bantamweight	Abdul Hussein	def.	Cody Gibson	Submission (arm-triangle choke)	3	3:07

== Bonus awards ==
The following fighters received bonuses: $100,000. The other finishes received $25,000 additional bonuses.

- Fight of the Night: Rizvan Kuniev vs. Tyrell Fortune
- Performance of the Night: Ramazan Temirov and Valter Walker

== See also ==
- 2026 in UFC
- List of current UFC fighters
- List of UFC events
