= 2022 in Eagle Fighting Championship =

Information
- First date: January 28, 2022

Events

Fights

Chronology
2021 in Eagle FC	2022 in Eagle Fighting Championship	2023 in Eagle FC

2022 was the first year in the history of the Eagle Fighting Championship, a mixed martial arts promotion based in Miami, Florida. The year began with Eagle FC 44.

== Background ==
Khabib Nurmagomedov announced that Eagle Fighting Championship has plans for United States expansion in 2022. The organization plans to hold as many as 10 events in the USA.

== List of events ==
#	Event	Date	Venue	Location
44	Eagle FC 44: Spong vs. Kharitonov	January 28, 2022	FLXcast Arena	Miami, Florida, U.S.
45	Eagle FC: Selection 4	January 29, 2022	—N/a	Kizilyurt, Russia
46	Eagle FC 45: Gitinovasov vs. Magomedov	February 18, 2022	Crocus Expo	Moscow, Russia
47	Eagle FC 46: Lee vs. Sanchez	March 11, 2022	FLXcast Arena	Miami, Florida, U.S.
48	Eagle FC 47: Dos Santos vs. De Castro	May 20, 2022	FLXcast Arena	Miami, Florida, U.S.
49	Eagle FC 48 & Naiza FC 41	July 16, 2022	On the shore of the Caspian Sea	Aktau, Kazakhstan
50	Eagle FC 49: Busurmankul vs. Magomedov	August 10, 2022	—N/a	Bishkek, Kyrgyzstan
51	Eagle FC 50: Nurgozhay vs. Andreitsev	August 21, 2022	Barys Arena	Nur-Sultan, Kazakhstan
52	Eagle FC: Selection 5 Cup of Minin	October 30, 2022	DS Youth	Nizhny Novgorod, Russia
53	Eagle FC: Selection 6	December 2, 2022	Sports Palace Yubileynyy	Almetyevsk, Russia
54	Eagle FC 51: Izmodenov vs. Mukhtarov	December 10, 2022	KSK Zhayyk	Atyrau, Kazakhstan

== Title fight ==
Title fights in 2022
Weight class				Method	Round	Time	Event	Notes
Featherweight	Rasul Magomedov	def.	Abdurakhman Gitinovasov	Decision (split)	5	5:00	Eagle FC 45	(Note: For the interim Eagle FC Featherweight Championship.)
Heavyweight	Rizvan Kuniev (c)	def.	Anthony Hamilton	Submission (guillotine choke)	1	1:17	Eagle FC 46	(Note: For the Eagle FC Heavyweight Championship.)
Bantamweight	Renat Khavalov (c)	def.	Ramazan Amaev	TKO (punches)	3	4:40	Eagle FC 48 & Naiza FC 41	(Note: For the Eagle FC Bantamweight Championship.)
Middleweight	Dauren Ermekov	def.	Gamzat Khiramagomedov	TKO (punches)	2	2:06	Eagle FC 48 & Naiza FC 41	(Note: For the interim Eagle FC Middleweight Championship.)
Flyweight	Irgit Oveenchi	def.	Magomedrasul Gadzhiev	KO (punches)	3	3:09	Eagle FC 49	(Note: For the vacant Eagle FC Flyweight Championship.)
Featherweight	Rasul Magomedov (ic)	def.	Busurmankul Abdibait Uulu (c)	Decision (unanimous)	5	5:00	Eagle FC 49	(Note: For the Eagle FC Featherweight Championship.)
Welterweight	Imam-Shapi Mukhtarov	def.	Azamat Dzhigkaev	TKO (body kick)	3	2:37	Eagle FC 50	(Note: For the interim Eagle FC Welterweight Championship.)
Light Heavyweight	Diyar Nurgozhay	def.	Konstantin Andreitsev	Decision (unanimous)	5	5:00	Eagle FC 50	(Note: For the inaugural Eagle FC Light Heavyweight Championship.)
Bantamweight	Renat Khavalov (c)	def.	Renat Ondar	Decision (unanimous)	5	5:00	Eagle FC 51	(Note: For the Eagle FC Bantamweight Championship.)
Welterweight	Denis Izmodenov	def.	Imam-Shapi Mukhtarov	Decision (unanimous)	5	5:00	Eagle FC 51	(Note: For the vacant Eagle FC Welterweight Championship.)

== Eagle FC 44: Spong vs. Kharitonov ==
Eagle FC 44: Spong vs. Kharitonov
- Promotion: Eagle Fighting Championship
- Date: January 28, 2022
- Venue: FLXcast Arena
- City: Miami, Florida, United States

Eagle Fighting Championship 44: Spong vs. Kharitonov was a mixed martial arts event held by Eagle Fighting Championship on January 28, 2022, in Miami, Florida, USA.

=== Background ===
The main event was initially set to feature the former It's Showtime champion Tyrone Spong and UFC veteran Antônio Silva, but Silva was forced off the card on December 13 due to undisclosed reasons. Instead, the event was headlined by a heavyweight bout between Spong and Sergei Kharitonov, who stepped in for Silva.

Former UFC Bantamweight champion Renan Barão was scheduled to face Horacio Gutiérrez at this event, but the bout was cancelled.

=== Results ===
Main card
Weight class				Method	Round	Time	Notes
Heavyweight	Sergei Kharitonov	def.	Tyrone Spong	TKO (punches)	2	2:55
Light Heavyweight	Rashad Evans	def.	Gabriel Checco	Decision (unanimous) (30–27, 30–27, 30–27)	3	5:00
Bantamweight	Ray Borg	def.	Cody Gibson	Decision (unanimous) (29–27, 29–28, 29–28)	3	5:00
Welterweight (175 lb)	Ramazan Kuramagomedov	def.	John Howard	Decision (unanimous) (30–27, 30–27, 30–26)	3	5:00
Welterweight (175 lb)	Raimond Magomedaliev	def.	Anthony Njokuani	TKO (punches)	1	2:49
Preliminary Card
Catchweight (149.4 lb)	Dylan Salvador	def.	Arman Ospanov	TKO (corner stoppage)	2	5:00	(Note: Originally a featherweight bout; Salvador missed weight.)
Heavyweight	Yorgan De Castro	def.	Shaun Asher	Submission (guillotine choke)	1	1:04
Welterweight (175 lb)	Demarques Jackson	def.	Miles Hunsinger	TKO (punches)	1	0:54
Bantamweight	Shawn Bunch	def.	Firdavs Khasanov	Decision (unanimous) (29–28, 29–28, 29–28)	3	5:00
Super Lightweight (165 lb)	Loik Radzhabov	def.	Zach Zane	Submission (guillotine choke)	1	3:23
Lightweight	Ayadi Majdeddine	def.	Sitik Muduev	Decision (unanimous) (29–28, 29–28, 29–28)	3	5:00

== Eagle FC: Selection 4 ==
Eagle FC: Selection 4
- Promotion: Eagle Fighting Championship
- Date: January 29, 2022
- City: Kizilyurt, Russia

Eagle FC: Selection 4 was a mixed martial arts event held by Eagle Fighting Championship on January 29, 2022, in Kizilyurt, Russia.

=== Results ===
Main card
Weight class				Method	Round	Time	Notes
Flyweight	Charmigula Sirazhudinov	def.	Ilmiyamin Dzhavatov	Decision (unanimous)	3	5:00
Lightweight	Magomed Zaynukov	def.	Nasratullah Akhondzada	TKO (elbow and punches)	1	2:30
Welterweight	Shamidkhan Magomedov	def.	Akzhol Taabaldiev	TKO (punches)	2	2:45
Middleweight	Dzhambulat Medzhidov	def.	Magomed Shaikhov	TKO (punches)	1	0:38
Preliminary card
Bantamweight	Shamil Abdulkhamidov	def.	Khunkar Dadaev	Submission (rear-naked choke)	1	2:33
Bantamweight	Said-Khusein Akhyadov	def.	Makhach Solimanov	TKO (punches)	1	0:18
Welterweight	Magomedsultan Magomedsultanov	def.	Akhmedkhan Akhmedov	TKO (punches)	1	4:53
Featherweight	Arslan Muradbekov	def.	Gadzhimurad Magomedov	TKO (punches)	2	1:30
Middleweight	Musa Ustarov	def.	Arsen Kurbanov	TKO (punches)	1	3:08
Featherweight	Magomed-Amin Pirbudakov	def.	Sirazhudin Abdulaev	TKO (knee and punches)	3	4:43
Light Heavyweight	Arslan Bilalov	def.	Islam Bialiev	TKO (punches)	1	0:18
Bantamweight	Sharaputdin Ataev	def.	Asad Datsilaev	TKO (punches)	1	2:28
Bantamweight	Bilal Alikhadzhiev	def.	Ibragim Ibragimov	Decision (unanimous)	3	5:00
Bantamweight	Magomed Magomedov	def.	Magomedtagir Mirzalabandov	Decision (unanimous)	3	5:00
Lightweight	Ibragim Abdulkadyrov	def.	Rustem Dyshekov	Submission (scarf hold)	1	3:58
Middleweight	Islam Yusupov	def.	Yusup Abukarov	TKO (punches)	1	1:45
Featherweight	Aydamir Magomedov	def.	Ramiz Ismailov	TKO (punches)	2	1:57
Lightweight	Saypulakadi Abdurakhmanov	def.	Batal Seferov	TKO (punches)	1	3:45

== Eagle FC 45: Gitinovasov vs. Magomedov ==
Eagle FC 45: Gitinovasov vs. Magomedov
- Promotion: Eagle Fighting Championship
- Date: February 18, 2022
- Venue: Crocus Expo
- City: Moscow, Russia

Eagle FC 45: Gitinovasov vs. Magomedov was a mixed martial arts event held by Eagle Fighting Championship on February 18, 2022, in Moscow, Russia.

=== Results ===
Main card
Weight class				Method	Round	Time	Notes
Featherweight	Rasul Magomedov	def.	Abdurakhman Gitinovasov	Decision (split)	5	5:00	(Note: For the interim Eagle FC Featherweight Championship)
Welterweight	Denis Izmodenov	def.	Mikhail Doroshenko	Decision (unanimous)	3	5:00
Welterweight	Uzair Abdurakov	def.	Khayal Iskenderov	Submission (keylock)	1	4:25
Preliminary Card
Featherweight	Georgy Shakhruramazanov	def.	Roman Avdalyan	Decision (unanimous)	3	5:00
Lightweight	Ramin Sultanov	def.	Dinislam Kamavov	Submission (kneebar)	1	2:28
Featherweight	Yusup-Khadzhi Zubariev	def.	Alexander Derkach	Submission (arm-triangle choke)	2	3:45
Flyweight	Rashid Vagabov	def.	Aleksey Kim	Decision (unanimous)	3	5:00
Bantamweight	Renat Ondar	def.	Hussain Bakhsh Safari	KO (punches)	1	0:23
Bantamweight	Sharapudin Magomedov	def.	Rashid Kurbanov	Decision (unanimous)	3	5:00
Welterweight	Shakhban Alkhasov	def.	Arsen Nersesyan	Submission (brabo choke)	1	1:03
Middleweight	Shamil Magomedov	def.	Ramazan Gamzatov	Decision (unanimous)	3	5:00
Middleweight	Akhmed Gazichaev	def.	Sergey Alekseevich	Submission (rear-naked choke)	1	2:10
Lightweight	Magomed Kurbanov	def.	Akram Dzhakhiev	Decision (unanimous)	3	5:00
Lightweight	Shakh Mammaev	def.	Magomed Aliev	TKO (punches)	3	1:53

== Eagle FC 46: Lee vs. Sanchez ==
Eagle FC 46: Lee vs. Sanchez
- Promotion: Eagle Fighting Championship
- Date: March 11, 2022
- Venue: FLXcast Arena
- City: Miami, Florida, USA

Eagle Fighting Championship 46: Lee vs. Sanchez was a mixed martial arts event held by Eagle Fighting Championship on March 11, 2022, in Miami, Florida, USA.

=== Background ===
The main event featured Diego Sanchez and Kevin Lee in their Eagle FC debuts in a 165 pounds bout.

At weigh ins, Impa Kasanganay and Ikram Aliskerov missed weight for their respective bouts. Kasanganay weighed in at 179.2 pounds, 3.2 pounds over the welterweight non-title limit. Aliskerov weighed in at 186.2 pounds, 0.2 pounds over the middleweight non-title limit. Both of their bouts proceeded at catchweight and they were each fined a percentage of their individual purses respectively, which went to their opponents.

=== Results ===
Main card
Weight class				Method	Round	Time	Notes
Super Lightweight (165 lb)	Kevin Lee	def.	Diego Sanchez	Decision (unanimous) (30–27, 30–27, 30–27)	3	5:00
Heavyweight	Rizvan Kuniev (c)	def.	Anthony Hamilton	Submission (guillotine choke)	1	1:17	(Note: For the Eagle FC Heavyweight Championship)
Bantamweight	Ray Borg	def.	Ricky Bandejas	Decision (split) (29–28, 28–29, 29–28)	3	5:00
Super Lightweight (165 lb)	Handesson Ferreira	def.	Zach Juusola	Decision (unanimous) (30–27, 30–27, 30–27)	3	5:00
Catchweight (179.2 lb)	Raimond Magomedaliev	def.	Impa Kasanganay	Decision (split) (29–28, 28–29, 29–28)	3	5:00
Preliminary Card
Catchweight (186.2 lb)	Ikram Aliskerov	def.	Nah-Shon Burrell	Decision (unanimous) (29–28, 29–28, 29–28)	3	5:00
Bantamweight	Irwin Rivera	def.	Firdavs Khasanov	TKO (body kick and punches)	2	4:48
Catchweight (160 lb)	Archie Colgan	def.	Dylan Mantello	Decision (unanimous) (30–27, 30–27, 30–27)	3	5:00
Welterweight (175 lb)	Tyler Ray	def.	Thomas Webb	Decision (unanimous) (30–27, 30–26, 30–26)	3	5:00
Featherweight	Sitik Muduev	def.	Caio Uruguai	Decision (unanimous) (30–27, 30–27, 30–27)	3	5:00
Middleweight	Ryder Newman	def.	Emmanuel Walo	Decision (split) (29–28, 29–28, 28–29)	3	5:00

== Eagle FC 47: Dos Santos vs. De Castro ==
Eagle FC 47: Dos Santos vs. De Castro
- Promotion: Eagle Fighting Championship
- Date: May 20, 2022
- Venue: FLXcast Arena
- City: Miami, Florida, USA

Eagle Fighting Championship 47: Dos Santos vs. De Castro was a mixed martial arts event held by Eagle Fighting Championship on May 20, 2022, in Miami, Florida, USA .

=== Background ===
In the main event, the show featured the debut of former UFC heavyweight champion Junior Dos Santos as he faced fellow UFC veteran Yorgan De Castro.

The co-main event featured the debut of former Bellator MMA middleweight champion and UFC contender Héctor Lombard against fellow UFC alum Thiago Silva, who returned after a three-year absence from mixed martial arts competition.

At weigh ins, Maki Pitolo, Doug Usher, Alexandre Almeida, and Paulo Silva missed weight for their respective bouts. Pitolo weighed in at 187.4 pounds, Usher weighed in at 189 pounds, Alexandre Almeida weighed in at 158.4 pounds, and Paulo Silva weighed in at 156.6 pounds.

=== Results ===
Main card
Weight class				Method	Round	Time	Notes
Heavyweight	Yorgan De Castro	def.	Junior Dos Santos	TKO (shoulder Injury)	3	0:35	(Note: Dos Santos dislocated his right shoulder while throwing a punch and was deemed unable to continue.)
Light Heavyweight	Héctor Lombard	vs.	Thiago Silva	No Contest (illegal knee)	2	1:44	(Note: Silva landed an accidental illegal knee while Lombard was down that rendered him unable to continue.)
Light Heavyweight	Maki Pitolo	def.	Doug Usher	KO (punches)	1	0:30	(Note: The bout changed from Middleweight to Light Heavyweight due to both fighters missed weight. Pitolo weighed 187.4 lbs and Usher weighed 189 lbs.)
Light Heavyweight	Andrew Sanchez	def.	Gabriel Checco	Decision (unanimous) (30–27, 30–27, 30–27)	3	5:00
Lightweight	Akhmed Aliev	def.	Darrell Horcher	KO (punches)	1	0:30
Preliminary Card
Super Lightweight	Islam Mamedov	def.	Zach Zane	Submission (rear-naked choke)	1	1:50
Light Heavyweight	Ronny Markes	def.	Reggie Peña	TKO (knee injury)	2	1:21
Lightweight	Roosevelt Roberts	def.	Alexandre De Almeida	Decision (unanimous) (30–27, 29–28, 29–28)	3	5:00	(Note: De Almeida missed weight (158.4 lbs))
Lightweight	Paulo Silva	def.	Sean Soriano	Decision (split) (28–29, 29–28, 29–28)	3	5:00	(Note: Silva missed weight (156.6 lbs))
Bantamweight	Adi Alić	def.	Shawn Bunch	Decision (unanimous) (29–28, 29–28, 29–28)	3	5:00
Lightweight	Dylan Mantello	def.	Dennis Hughes	TKO (doctor stoppage)	2	5:00

== Eagle FC 48 & Naiza FC 41 ==
Eagle FC 48 & Naiza FC 41
- Promotion: Eagle Fighting Championship; Naiza Fighting Championship
- Date: July 16, 2022
- Venue: On the shore of the Caspian Sea
- City: Aktau, Kazakhstan

Eagle Fighting Championship 48 & Naiza FC 41 was a mixed martial arts event held by Eagle Fighting Championship & Naiza Fighting Championship on July 16, 2022, in Aktau, Kazakhstan.

=== Results ===
Main card
Weight class				Method	Round	Time	Notes
Middleweight	Dauren Ermekov	def.	Gamzat Khiramagomedov	TKO (punches)	2	2:06	(Note: For the interim Eagle FC Middleweight Championship)
Middleweight	Ruslan Shamilov	def.	Murad Abdurakhmanov	Submission (guillotine choke)	1	2:51	(Note: For the vacant Naiza FC Middleweight Championship)
Bantamweight	Renat Khavalov (c)	def.	Ramazan Amaev	TKO (punches)	3	4:40	(Note: For the Eagle FC Bantamweight Championship)
Middleweight	Shamil Magomedov	def.	Igor Svirid	TKO (punches)	1	2:40
Preliminary Card
Light Heavyweight	Konstantin Andreitsev	def.	Zakhar Ryabov	Decision (unanimous)	3	5:00
Middleweight	Sergey Kalinin	def.	Nutsalkhan Umakhanov	Decision (unanimous)	3	5:00
Flyweight	Ruslan Sariev	def.	Kayck Alencar	KO (body kick and punch)	1	3:03
Bantamweight	Magomed Al-Abdullah	def.	Alan Utegaliev	Decision (unanimous)	3	5:00
Welterweight	Ramazan Gasanov	def.	Nasimjon Sharipov	Submission (ezekiel choke)	2	1:45
Heavyweight	Alan Matikov	def.	Ivan Romanov	Decision (unanimous)	3	5:00
Flyweight	Bolat Zamanbekov	def.	Syimyk Eldiyar Uulu	Submission (rear-naked choke)	2	2:52
Light Heavyweight	Magomed Gadzhiyasulov	def.	Norik Tadevosyan	TKO (punches)	1	2:46
Welterweight	Dhouglas Ribeiro	def.	Tamerlan Khadzhimuradov	TKO (doctor stoppage)	2	5:00
Featherweight	Bakhtiyar Orazgeldiev	def.	Mavlet Amiro	TKO (punches)	2	4:41
Middleweight	Joseph Henle	def.	Roman Dzhomart	Submission (rear-naked choke)	2	2:57
Bantamweight	Meyrbek Tulegenov	def.	Djeyhun Godjali	Submission (armbar)	1	3:10

== Eagle FC 49: Busurmankul vs. Magomedov ==
Eagle FC 49: Busurmankul vs. Magomedov
- Promotion: Eagle Fighting Championship
- Date: August 10, 2022
- City: Bishkek, Kyrgyzstan

Eagle Fighting Championship 49: Busurmankul vs. Magomedov was a mixed martial arts event held by Eagle Fighting Championship on August 10, 2022, in Bishkek, Kyrgyzstan.

=== Fight card ===
Main card
Weight class				Method	Round	Time	Notes
Featherweight	Rasul Magomedov (ic)	def.	Busurmankul Abdibait Uulu (c)	Decision (unanimous)	5	5:00	(Note: For the Eagle FC Featherweight Championship)
Flyweight	Irgit Oveenchi	def.	Magomedrasul Gadzhiev	KO (punches)	3	3:09	(Note: For the vacant Eagle FC Flyweight Championship)
Flyweight	Aydarbek Abdibait	def.	Vitaly Kositsyn	Decision (unanimous)	3	5:00
Super Lightweight (165 lb)	Shakhban Alkhasov	def.	Mikhail Doroshenko	Submission (rear-naked choke)	1	1:23
Preliminary card
Featherweight	Georgy Shakhruramazanov	def.	Zhanysh Uraimov Uulu	TKO (punches)	1	4:29
Featherweight	Mansur Dzhamburaev	def.	Akhkubeg Omarov	Decision (unanimous)	3	5:00
Welterweight	Khabib Nabiev	def.	Konstantin Veselkin	Decision (unanimous)	3	5:00
Lightweight	Amru Magomedov	def.	Elmurod Madaminov	Submission (rear-naked choke)	1	2:45
Heavyweight	Vladimir Dayneko	def.	Soslan Gasiev	KO (punches)	1	0:46
Super Lightweight (165 lb)	Adis Taalaybek Uulu	def.	Murad Khasaev	Decision (unanimous)	3	5:00
Heavyweight	Arslan Bilalov	def.	Aybolat Muratali	TKO (arm injury)	1	1:12
Flyweight	Sergey Shirkunov	def.	Mukhamedali Aliev	Decision (unanimous)	3	5:00
Featherweight	Yusif Gashimov	der.	Dzhamal Aliev	Submission (rear-naked choke)	3	3:39
Lightweight	Magomed Kurbanov	def.	Ali Magomedov	Decision (unanimous)	3	5:00

== Eagle FC 50: Nurgozhay vs. Andreitsev ==
Eagle FC 50: Nurgozhay vs. Andreitsev
- Promotion: Eagle Fighting Championship
- Date: August 21, 2022
- Venue: Barys Arena
- City: Nur-Sultan, Kazakhstan

Eagle Fighting Championship 50: Nurgozhay vs. Andreitsev was a mixed martial arts event held by Eagle Fighting Championship on August 21, 2022, in Nur-Sultan, Kazakhstan.

=== Fight card ===
Main card
Weight class				Method	Round	Time	Notes
Light Heavyweight	Diyar Nurgozhay	def.	Konstantin Andreitsev	Decision (unanimous)	5	5:00	(Note: For the inaugural Eagle FC Light Heavyweight Championship)
Welterweight	Imam-Shapi Mukhtarov	def.	Azamat Dzhigkaev	TKO (body kick)	3	2:37	(Note: For the interim Eagle FC Welterweight Championship)
Featherweight	Zhasulan Akimzhanov	def.	Ruslan Yamanbaev	TKO (punches)	2	3:22
Bantamweight	Abdulmalik Mugidinov	def.	Daniyar Koishybek	Decision (unanimous)	3	5:00
Bantamweight	Sabit Zhusupov	def.	Umidjon Musaev	TKO (punches)	1	3:27
Preliminary card
Super Lightweight	Uzair Abdurakov	def.	Maxim Konovalov	Submission (ninja choke)	1	4:47
Middleweight	Imamshafi Aliev	def.	Khayal Iskenderov	Submission (arm-triangle choke)	2	3:11
Featherweight	Abdurakhman Gitinovasov	def.	Yusup-Khadzhi Zubariev	Decision (unanimous)	3	5:00
Lightweight	Ali Kabdulla	def.	Valery Gritsutin	Submission (rear-naked choke)	2	2:40
Lightweight	Kasum Kasumov	def.	Subanbekov Syimyk	Submission (D'arce choke)	2	2:52
Flyweight	Sanzhar Adilov	def.	Charmigula Sirazhudinov	Decision (unanimous)	3	5:00
Lightweight	Anvar Chergesov	def.	Bagautdin Abasov	Decision (unanimous)	3	5:00
Welterweight	Shamidkhan Magomedov	def.	Bekzat Isakov	Submission (rear-naked choke)	2
Flyweight	Israil Gadzhiagaev	def.	Kirill Gekkel	Decision (unanimous)	3	5:00

== Eagle FC: Selection 5 Cup of Minin ==
Eagle FC: Selection 5 Cup of Minin
- Promotion: Eagle Fighting Championship
- Date: October 30, 2022
- Venue: DS Youth
- City: Nizhny Novgorod, Russia

Eagle FC: Selection 5 Cup of Minin was a mixed martial arts event held by Eagle Fighting Championship on October 30, 2022, in Nizhny Novgorod, Russia.

=== Results ===
Main card
Weight class				Method	Round	Time	Notes
Super Lightweight	Magomed Kurbanov	def.	Imomadkhan Iskhakov	Decision (unanimous)	3	5:00
Featherweight	Talekh Gamidov	def.	Khasan Esmurziev	TKO (punches)	2	2:42
Bantamweight	Ernest Sadykov	def.	Magomed Suleymanov	KO (head kick)	1	3:35
Flyweight	Said Akhmedkhanov	def.	Leonid Malozemov	Decision (unanimous)	3	5:00
Lightweight	Kamal Goigereev	def.	Aziz Mukhtarov	TKO (punches)	2	3:27
Lightweight	Zubair Zubairov	def.	Validjon Radjabov	Submission (armbar)	1	3:48
Lightweight	Tamirlan Saralapov	vs.	Nikita Maslovskiy	Submission (guillotine choke)	1	3:09
Bantamweight	Shakhban Gapizov	def.	Atia Talib	KO (body kick)	1	3:05
Lightweight	Sergey Smelov	def.	Akhmed Raupov	TKO (punches)	3	4:15
Featherweight	Magomed Gadzhimuradov	def.	Kamil Ataev	Submission (rear-naked choke)	2	4:43

== Eagle FC: Selection 6 ==
Eagle FC: Selection 6
- Promotion: Eagle Fighting Championship
- Date: December 2, 2022
- Venue: Sports Palace Yubileynyy
- City: Almetyevsk, Russia

Eagle FC: Selection 6 was a mixed martial arts event held by Eagle Fighting Championship on December 2, 2022 in Almetyevsk, Russia.

=== Results ===
Main card
Weight class				Method	Round	Time	Notes
Middleweight	Shamil Yamilov	def.	Magomed Zakriev	Decision (unanimous)	3	5:00
Super Lightweight	Sergey Ignatenko	vs.	Ravshan Akhmedov	TKO (punches)	1	0:45
Bantamweight	Ruslan Sariev	def.	Aleksey Kim	KO (body kick)	1	3:38
Flyweight	Rinat Mingazov	def.	Ermek Akhmatov	TKO (elbows and punches)	2	2:08
Featherweight	Musa Kazikhanov	def.	Amr Hamed Elseidi	TKO (punches)	1	4:27
Featherweight	Nidzhat Imanov	def.	Azizullo Akbaraliev	TKO (punches)	2	3:14
Flyweight	Kunni Kunniev	def.	Isomidin Abdullazhonov	Decision (unanimous)	3	5:00
Flyweight	Mkhitar Barseghyan	def.	Magomed Gapizov	Decision (unanimous)	3	5:00
Welterweight	Mukhtar Abdulkerimov	def.	Artem Khalitov	TKO (retirement)	1	5:00
Featherweight	Shakhban Gapizov	def.	Firuz Rakhmatshoev	KO (head kick and punches)	1	0:51
Flyweight	Akhmedrustam Hasanov	def.	Aripzhan Mirzayev	Decision (unanimous)	3	5:00

== Eagle FC 51: Izmodenov vs. Mukhtarov ==
Eagle FC 51: Odilov vs. Ermekov
- Promotion: Eagle Fighting Championship
- Date: December 10, 2022
- Venue: KSK Zhayyk
- City: Atyrau, Kazakhstan

Eagle FC 51: Izmodenov vs. Mukhtarov was a mixed martial arts event held by Eagle Fighting Championship on December 10, 2022 in Atyrau, Kazakhstan.

=== Fight card ===
Main card
Weight class				Method	Round	Time	Notes
Welterweight	Denis Izmodenov	def.	Imam-Shapi Mukhtarov	Decision (unanimous)	5	5:00	(Note: For the vacant Eagle FC Welterweight Championship.)
Bantamweight	Renat Khavalov (c)	def.	Renat Ondar	Decision (unanimous)	5	5:00	(Note: For the Eagle FC Bantamweight Championship.)
Lightweight	Jora Ayvazyan	def.	Ali Kabdulla	Decision (unanimous)	3	5:00
Preliminary card
Heavyweight	Vladimir Daineko	def.	Alan Makitov	Submission (reverse arm-triangle choke)	1	4:13
Featherweight	Gadzhimurad Aliev	def.	Mansur Dzhamburaev	Decision (unanimous)	3	5:00
Welterweight	Dinislam Kamavov	def.	Bakhytbek Duyshobay	Submission (rear-naked choke)	3	2:24
Catchweight (130 lbs)	Farkhad Kozhantaev	def.	Sergey Nekhoroshoev	TKO (punches)	1	2:13
Bantamweight	Al Abdullah Magomedov	def.	Bakhtiyar Nesipbek	Decision (unanimous)	3	5:00
Welterweight	Azamat Dzhigkaev	def.	Akhmed Gazichaev	Submission (guillotine choke)	2	1:46
Lightweight	Murad Bilarov	def.	Nurzhan Zholdybay	Submission (rear-naked choke)	1	2:53
Bantamweight	Dulat Ayazhanov	def.	Anuarbek Bekembetov	Submission (armbar)	1	2:52
Catchweight (139 lbs)	Nurbek Otar	def.	Feruzbek Ishonkulov	TKO (punches)	2	1:50
Bantamweight	Shamil Magomedov	def.	Doniyor Yokubjonov	Submission (arm-triangle choke)	1	1:32
Featherweight	Adilbek Kairgali	def.	Bekhzod Nazrulloev	Submission (ninja choke)	2	3:47
Welterweight	Ramazan Gamzatov	def.	Irakli Kuchukhidze	Decision (unanimous)	3	5:00

== See also ==
- 2022 in UFC
- 2022 in Bellator MMA
- 2022 in ONE Championship
- 2022 in Absolute Championship Akhmat
- 2022 in Konfrontacja Sztuk Walki
- 2022 in Rizin Fighting Federation
- 2022 in LUX Fight League
- 2022 in AMC Fight Nights
- 2022 in Brave Combat Federation
- 2022 in Road FC
- 2022 Professional Fighters League season
- 2022 in Legacy Fighting Alliance
