= UFC Fight Night: Magny vs. Prates =

Mixed martial arts event in 2024

- The poster for UFC Fight Night: Magny vs. Prates
- Promotion: Ultimate Fighting Championship
- Date: November 9, 2024
- Venue: UFC Apex
- City: Enterprise, Nevada, United States
- Attendance: Not announced

Event chronology
UFC Fight Night: Moreno vs. Albazi	UFC Fight Night: Magny vs. Prates	UFC 309: Jones vs. Miocic

UFC Fight Night: Magny vs. Prates (also known as UFC Fight Night 247, UFC Vegas 100, and UFC on ESPN+ 105) was a mixed martial arts event produced by the Ultimate Fighting Championship that took place on November 9, 2024, at the UFC Apex in Enterprise, Nevada, part of the Las Vegas Valley, United States.

== Background ==
This was the first UFC event held in Nevada since cannabis was officially removed from the state's list of banned substances. At the beginning of 2024, the Combat Sports Anti-Doping (CSAD) and Drug Free Sport organizations removed cannabis from their banned substances list when the UFC shifted its anti-doping testing from the United States Anti-Doping Agency (USADA) to CSAD. On October 30, 2024, the Nevada State Athletic Commission also announced its decision to remove cannabis from the state's list of prohibited substances. They stated, "The possession, use, or consumption of cannabis or cannabis products will not be considered an anti-doping violation."

A flyweight bout between former two-time UFC Flyweight Champion Brandon Moreno and Amir Albazi was expected to headline the event. They were previously expected to meet at UFC Fight Night: Moreno vs. Royval 2 earlier in the year but Albazi withdrew due to a neck injury. However, it was announced a day later than that report that the bout was moved to UFC Fight Night: Moreno vs. Albazi one week before this event.

A welterweight bout between Neil Magny and Carlos Prates served as the event headliner.

A bantamweight bout between former UFC Bantamweight Champion Cody Garbrandt and former LFA Bantamweight Champion Miles Johns was originally scheduled for UFC Fight Night: Royval vs. Taira. However, the bout was moved to this event for unknown reasons. In turn, Garbrandt withdrew from the bout due to undisclosed reasons and the bout was scrapped.

Former ONE Middleweight and Light Heavyweight World Champion Reinier de Ridder made his promotional debut in a middleweight bout against Gerald Meerschaert at this event.

A women's bantamweight bout between Melissa Mullins and Montserrat Rendon was scheduled for this event. However, Rendon withdrew from the fight for unknown reasons and was replaced by promotional newcomer Klaudia Syguła. At the weigh-ins, Mullins weighed in at 137 pounds, one pound over the bantamweight non-title fight limit. The bout proceeded at catchweight and she was fined 20 percent of her purse, which went to Syguła.

A welterweight rematch between Nicolas Dalby and Elizeu Zaleski dos Santos was scheduled for this event. The pairing previously met at UFC Fight Night: Condit vs. Alves, which Dalby won by split decision. However, Dalby withdrew from the fight for unknown reasons and was replaced by promotional newcomer Zach Scroggin. At the weigh-ins, Scroggin weighed in at 174 pounds, three pounds over the welterweight non-title fight limit. The bout proceeded at catchweight and he was fined 20 percent of his purse, which went to Zaleski dos Santos.

A bantamweight bout between The Return of The Ultimate Fighter: Team Volkanovski vs. Team Ortega bantamweight winner Ricky Turcios and Bernardo Sopaj was expected to take place at the co-main event, but it was scrapped after the weigh-ins due to undisclosed medical issues related to Turcios.

== Results ==
Main card (ESPN+)
Weight class				Method	Round	Time	Notes
Welterweight	Carlos Prates	def.	Neil Magny	KO (punch)	1	4:50
Middleweight	Reinier de Ridder	def.	Gerald Meerschaert	Submission (arm-triangle choke)	3	1:44
Bantamweight	Gastón Bolaños	def.	Cortavious Romious	Decision (unanimous) (30–26, 30–27, 30–27)	3	5:00
Women's Strawweight	Gillian Robertson	def.	Luana Pinheiro	Decision (unanimous) (29–27, 29–28, 29–28)	3	5:00
Middleweight	Mansur Abdul-Malik	def.	Duško Todorović	TKO (knee and punches)	1	2:44
Preliminary card (ESPN+)
Women's Strawweight	Denise Gomes	def.	Karolina Kowalkiewicz	Decision (unanimous) (30–27, 30–27, 29–28)	3	5:00
Catchweight (174 lb)	Elizeu Zaleski dos Santos	def.	Zach Scroggin	TKO (punches)	1	1:15
Welterweight	Charles Radtke	def.	Matthew Semelsberger	TKO (punches)	1	0:51
Bantamweight	Da'Mon Blackshear	def.	Cody Stamann	Submission (rear-naked choke)	1	4:19
Middleweight	Tresean Gore	def.	Antonio Trócoli	Submission (guillotine choke)	1	1:23
Catchweight (137 lb)	Melissa Mullins	def.	Klaudia Syguła	TKO (punches)	2	1:20

== Bonus awards ==
The following fighters received $50,000 bonuses.

- Fight of the Night: No bonus awarded.
- Performance of the Night: Carlos Prates, Mansur Abdul-Malik, Charles Radtke, and Da'Mon Blackshear

== See also ==
- 2024 in UFC
- List of current UFC fighters
- List of UFC events
