= Bantamweight (MMA) =

Weight class in mixed martial arts

The bantamweight division in mixed martial arts refers to a number of different MMA weight classes, which groups competitors within 126–135 lb (57.2-61.3 kg)

- The UFC bantamweight division, which groups competitors within the 126-135 lb (57–61 kg)
- The Shooto bantamweight division, which suits competitors below 125 lb (56.7 kg)
- The ONE Championship's bantamweight division, with upper limit at 65.8 kg (145.1 lb)
- The Road FC's bantamweight division, with upper limit at 135.6 lb (61.5 kg)

The bantamweight division sits between the lighter flyweight (116–125 lb) division and the heavier featherweight division (136–145 lb).

== Ambiguity and clarification ==
For the sake of uniformity, many American mixed martial arts websites refer to competitors between 126 and 135 lb (57 and 61 kg) as bantamweights, as it encompasses both the Shooto Featherweight division (132 lb / 60 kg) and the King of the Cage Flyweight division (135 lb / 61 kg). The Association of Boxing Commissions, which governs MMA in the United States, uses the 126-135 standard for "bantamweight".

Prior to UFC 31, 150-pound (68 kg) fighters were known as bantamweights in the Ultimate Fighting Championship, after which the weight limit was raised to 155 lb (70 kg), and the division was reinstated as the lightweight class.

The bantamweight limit, as defined by the Nevada State Athletic Commission and the Association of Boxing Commissions is 135 lb (61.36 kg).

== Professional champions ==
=== Current champions ===
These tables were last updated in December 2025.

Active title reign
Active title reign (interim)

Men:

Organization	Reign Began	Champion	Record	Defenses
UFC	October 24, 2026	(Russia) Petr Yan	21-5-0 (7KO 1SUB)	1
ONE Championship	July 31, 2026	(Azerbaijan) Elbek Alyshov	11-0-0 (2KO 8SUB)	0
Rizin FF	December 31, 2025	(United States) Danny Sabatello	19-4-1 (5KO 5SUB)	2
Absolute Championship Akhmat	February 28, 2025	(Brazil) Josiel Silva	23-7-0 (12KO 2SUB)	2
Brave Combat Federation	November 7, 2025	(Serbia) Borislav Nikolić	15-2-0 (6KO 8SUB)	0
Konfrontacja Sztuk Walki	February 21, 2026	(Ukraine) Vitalii Yakymenko	12-2-0 (4KO 5SUB)	1
CFFC	July 18, 2025	(Cuba) Sean Mora	7-1-0 (1KO 2SUB)	0
Cage Warriors	March 20, 2026	(Brazil) Weslley Maia	12-6-0 (5KO 4SUB)	0
Pancrase	December 24, 2023	(Japan) Tokitaka Nakanishi	12-4-0 (1KO 5SUB)	0
Ice Cage	December 26, 2025	(Finland) Abdul Hussein	15-2-0 (5KO 9SUB)	0
Jungle Fight	June 24, 2023	(Brazil) Tiago Pereira	9-0-0 (3KO 3SUB)	3
Legacy Fighting Alliance	September 11, 2026	(Brazil) Rafael Pereira	16-4-0 (4KO 5SUB)	0
LUX Fight League	October 24, 2025	(Venezuela) Mauricio Partida	11-0-0 (6KO 1SUB)	0
Shooto	September 21, 2025	(Japan) Kanata Nagai	9-0-1 (3KO 1SUB)	0
Oktagon MMA	N/A	Vacant	N/A	N/A
DEEP	March 29, 2024	(Japan) Ryuka Fukuda	25-9-1 (12KO 1SUB)	1

Women:

Organization	Reign Began	Champion	Record	Defenses
UFC	June 7, 2025	(United States) Kayla Harrison	20–1–0 (6KO 9SUB)	1
Invicta FC	December 13, 2024	(Brazil) Jennifer Maia	23-10-0 (1) (4KO 5SUB)	0
CFFC	July 18, 2025	(Brazil) Emily Martins	4-1-0 (0KO 4SUB)	0
Deep Jewels	N/A	Vacant	N/A	N/A
Legacy Fighting Alliance	N/A	Vacant	N/A	N/A
Jungle Fight	N/A	Vacant	N/A	N/A
Oktagon MMA	August 9, 2025	(Slovakia) Lucia Szabová	10-0-0 (3KO 5SUB)	0

== See also ==
- List of current MMA Bantamweight Champions
- List of current MMA Women's Bantamweight Champions
- List of UFC Bantamweight Champions
- List of WEC Bantamweight Champions (defunct)
- List of Pancrase Bantamweight Champions
- List of Road FC Bantamweight Champions
