= Ice Cage Fighting =

Finnish combat sports promotion company

- Sport: Combat sports: (MMA; kickboxing; Muay Thai; boxing)
- Founded: 2023
- Owners: Ice Cage Fighting Oy (Max Hynninen 75%, Makwan Amirkhani 25%)
- CEO: Max Hynninen
- Country: Finland
- Website: icecage.fi

Ice Cage Fighting is a Finnish combat sports promotion. The events incorporate mixed martial arts, boxing, Muay Thai and kickboxing. The first Ice Cage event was held in December 2023. The events are promoted by Max Hynninen and his company Ice Cage Fighting Oy. Makwan Amirkhani owns 25% of the company.

Ice Cage, alongside social media, has been considered influential on the rise of combat sports in Finland in the mid-2020s. Ice Cage 4 filled the 8,000 seat Helsinki Ice Hall. The highest profile bout of Ice Cage 4 was between a social media influencer Joni Takala and a former criminal and mixed martial artist Mika Ilmén. Ice Cage 5 was headlined by Theo Kolehmainen and the former UFC fighter Makwan Amirkhani.

== Current champions ==
Men
Division	Champion	Since	Ref.	Defenses
Mixed martial arts
Middleweight 83.9 kg (185.0 lb)	(Finland) Brayan Aspegren	September 19, 2026		0
Lightweight 70.3 kg (155.0 lb)	(Finland) Makwan Amirkhani	March 23, 2025		0
Bantamweight 61.2 kg (134.9 lb)	(Finland) Abdul Hussein	December 26, 2025		0

== Events ==
#	Event	Date	Venue	Location
9	Ice Cage	December 19, 2026	Veikkaus Arena	Helsinki, Finland
8	Ice Cage 8	September 9, 2026	Gatorade Center	Turku, Finland
7	Ice Cage 7	May 16, 2026	Nokia Arena	Tampere, Finland
6	Ice Cage 6	December 26, 2025	Espoo Metro Areena	Espoo, Finland
5	Ice Cage 5	October 4, 2025	Gatorade Center	Turku, Finland
4	Ice Cage 4	May 3, 2025	Helsinki Ice Hall	Helsinki, Finland
3	Ice Cage 3	December 4, 2024	Energia Areena	Vantaa, Finland
2	Ice Cage 2	May 11, 2024	Tikkurila Ice Hall	Vantaa, Finland
1	Ice Cage 1	December 16, 2023	Ahjo Training Center	Kerava, Finland

== Controversies ==
Ice Cage has been criticized for giving visibility for social media influencer Joni Takala, who has previously made some misogynistic comments on social media. Efforts were also made to build a show around the social media phenomenon behind Takala. Female boxer Eva Wahlström has told she was offered a match against Takala, but she refused the bout.

The chairman of the Finnish mixed martial arts federation Aleksi Kainulainen has criticized Ice Cage, considering the discussions surrounding the event to be detrimental to the reputation of mixed martial arts in Finland. Kainulainen believes that fighting events should be marketed with high-quality matches instead of social media buzz. He has considered the entertainment aspect of the event to be a worrying development. Similarly, the chairman of the Finnish Muay Thai Federation has emphasized that in fighting events, the focus should be on the sport and the athletes. However, the Muay Thai federation has not felt that Thai boxing has suffered reputational damage or that events such as Ice Cage are detrimental to the reputation of the sport.

Ice Cage has also drawn attention for the vulgar language used by fighters at the press conferences. According to promoter Max Hynninen, the comments do not reflect the values of Ice Cage.
