= Association of Boxing Commissions =

Boxing Commissions and MMA organisation governed by delegates of US and Canada

The Association of Boxing Commissions (ABC) is a North American not-for-profit professional boxing and mixed martial arts (MMA) organization that organizes contests and record-keeping. It is governed by delegates of state, provincial, and tribal athletic commissions in the United States and Canada.

The organization was formed in the 1980s when executive directors of various boxing commissions met to discuss how boxing was handled in their jurisdictions. Annual conventions are held and training/certification courses organized for contest judges and referees. At the 2018 convention in Florida, the ABC voted by 34 states to 2 to endorse BoxRec as the sole official record keeper for the sport of professional boxing. On the ABC's website, they direct boxers with federal ID's and commissions to search records on Fight Fax, where state commissions report contests. Boxrec intentionally excludes from professional records certain bouts (like AIBA World Series of Boxing) regulated by all state commissions represented by the ABC as licensed professional boxing according to law.

The aims of the ABC are to:

- promote continual improvement of boxing, mixed martial arts and other unarmed combat sports,
- promote uniform health and safety standards in those sports,
- promote standard reporting between members, including results, injury reports, suspensions and other medical information,
- encourage communication and cooperation between member organizations,
- publish medical and training information and provide education for all boxing and MMA related professionals,
- establish and run a charitable foundation to aid indigent boxers,
- encourage adherence to, and enforcement of, applicable federal laws by each member of the ABC.
