= Tymoteusz Łopaczyk =

Polish mixed martial artist (born 1996)

- Born: Tymoteusz Łopaczyk; 18 January 1996 (age 30); Bielawa, Poland
- Other names: Honey Badger
- Height: 5 ft 10 in (1.78 m)
- Weight: 176 lb (80 kg; 12 st 8 lb)
- Division: Welterweight (2017–present); Middleweight (2021); Light Heavyweight (2016)
- Reach: 73.2 in (186 cm)
- Style: Brazilian Jiu-jitsu, Boxing
- Fighting out of: Bielawa, Poland
- Team: Nemesis Pro Team; Bebson Gold Team
- Rank: Black belt in Brazilian Jiu-jitsu
- Years active: 2016–present

Mixed martial arts record
- Total: 18
- Wins: 14
- By knockout: 7
- By submission: 4
- By decision: 3
- By disqualification: 0
- Losses: 4
- By knockout: 1
- By submission: 0
- By decision: 3

Other information
- Mixed martial arts record from Sherdog

Tymoteusz Łopaczyk (born 18 January 1996) is a Polish professional mixed martial artist. He currently competes in the Welterweight division of Konfrontacja Sztuk Walki (KSW). He is a former Babilon MMA Welterweight Champion and winner of the Armia Fight Night Welterweight Sabre. He has previously competed under Fight Exclusive Night (FEN MMA).

== Professional career ==
=== Early career ===
Łopaczyk made his professional debut on April 23, 2016, against Wojciech Balejko. Łopaczyk won the fight via a first-round submission.

His next fight came on October 29, 2016, against Arkadiusz Maziakowski. Łopaczyk won the fight via a third-round submission.

=== Fight Exclusive Night ===
After a near year-long hiatus, Łopaczyk returned to fighting making his debut under Fight Exclusive Night (FEN MMA)) on October 14, 2017, against Adrian Błeszyński. Łopaczyk won the fight via a Unanimous Decision.

His next fight came on May 25, 2018, against Jacek Jędraszczyk. Łopaczyk won the fight via a third-round submission. This performance earned him his first career Fight of the Night bonus.

His next fight came on January 12, 2019, against Szymon Dusza. Łopaczyk lost the fight via a first-round TKO, suffering his first career defeat in the process.

=== Return to regionals ===
Following his defeat, his next fight came on June 14, 2019, against Łukasz Siwiec, debuting under the federation Armia Fight Night. Łopaczyk won the fight via a third-round TKO.

His next fight came on August 24, 2019, against Aleksandr Udoviko under the federation Bebson Arena. Łopaczyk won the fight via a first-round TKO.

=== Return to Fight Exclusive Night ===
Łopaczyk returned to Fight Exclusive Night on October 12, 2019, against Michał Golasiński. Łopaczyk won the fight via a second-round TKO.

=== Elite MMA Championship ===
Łopaczyk made his debut under German federation Elite MMA Championship on September 5, 2020, facing then former Ultimate Fighting Championship (UFC) fighter Ismail Naurdiev in the semifinal of the EMC Welterweight Grand Prix. Łopaczyk lost the fight via a Unanimous Decision.

=== Armia Fight Night Welterweight Sabre ===
Łopaczyk returned to Armia Fight Night on July 16, 2021, where he faced Jacek Bednorz for the vacant Armia Fight Night Welterweight Sabre. Łopaczyk won the fight via a first-round TKO, winning his first career championship in the process.

=== Babilon MMA ===
Łopaczyk made his debut under Babilon MMA on November 12, 2021, against Piotr Wawrzyniak. Łopaczyk lost the fight via a Unanimous Decision.

His next fight came on July 8, 2022, against Kleverson Cruz. Łopaczyk won the fight via a Unanimous Decision.

==== Babilon MMA Welterweight Champion ====
Łopaczyk faced Marek Jakimowicz for the interim Babilon MMA Welterweight Championship on September 22, 2023. Łopaczyk won the fight via a second-round TKO, winning his second career championship in the process. Following Łukasz Siwiec's departure from the federation, Łopaczyk was promoted to undisputed champion.

=== Strife MMA ===
Łopaczyk made his debut under Strife MMA on February 16, 2024, against Allisson Barbosa. Łopaczyk won the fight via a second-round TKO.

=== Konfrontacja Sztuk Walki ===
Łopaczyk signed for Konfrontacja Sztuk Walki (KSW) on May 17, 2024, vacating his Babilon MMA Welterweight Championship in the process.

He made his debut under the federation a month later on June 7, against Brian Hooi. Łopaczyk won the fight via a Unanimous Decision.

His next fight came on March 8, 2025, against Oskar Szczepaniak. Łopaczyk won the fight via a first-round TKO.

His next fight came on September 20, 2025, against Madars Fleminas. Łopaczyk lost the fight via a Split Decision.

His next fight came on June 20, 2026, against Andrzej Grzebyk. Łopaczyk won the fight via a third-round submission. This performance earned him his second career Fight of the Night bonus.

== Championships and accomplishments ==
=== Mixed martial arts ===
- Babilon MMA
  - Babilon MMA Welterweight Championship (One time; former)
- Armia Fight Night
  - Armia Fight Night Welterweight Sabre (One time; former)
- Fight Exclusive Night
  - Fight of the Night (One time)
- Konfrontacja Sztuk Walki
  - Fight of the Night (One time)

== Mixed martial arts record ==
Professional record breakdown
18 matches	14 wins	4 losses
By knockout	7	1
By submission	4	0
By decision	3	3

Res.	Record	Opponent	Method	Event	Date	Round	Time	Location	Notes
Win	14–4	Andrzej Grzebyk	Submission (guillotine choke)	KSW 119	June 20, 2026	3	3:11	Radom, Poland	Catchweight (176 lb) bout; Fight of the Night.
Loss	13–4	Madars Fleminas	Decision (split)	KSW 110	September 20, 2025	3	5:00	Rzeszów, Poland	
Win	13–3	Oskar Szczepaniak	TKO (punches)	KSW 104	March 8, 2025	1	4:38	Gorzów Wielkopolski, Poland	
Win	12–3	Brian Hooi	Decision (unanimous)	KSW 95	June 7, 2024	3	5:00	Olsztyn, Poland	
Win	11–3	Allisson Barbosa	TKO (punches)	Strife Tube 3	February 16, 2024	2	4:05	Radom, Poland	Catchweight (176 lb) bout.
Win	10–3	Marek Jakimowicz	TKO (punches)	Babilon MMA 38	September 22, 2023	2	2:33	Chełm, Poland	Return to Welterweight. Won the interim Babilon MMA Welterweight Championship. Łopaczyk was later promoted to undisputed champion.
Win	9–3	Kleverson Cruz	Decision (unanimous)	Babilon MMA 30	July 8, 2022	3	5:00	Międzyzdroje, Poland	Catchweight (176 lb) bout.
Loss	8–3	Piotr Wawrzyniak	Decision (unanimous)	Babilon MMA 26	November 12, 2021	3	5:00	Ożarów Mazowiecki, Poland	Middleweight debut.
Win	8–2	Jacek Bednorz	TKO (punches)	Armia Fight Night 10	July 16, 2021	1	3:35	Żywiec, Poland	Won the vacant Armia Fight Night Welterweight Sabre.
Loss	7–2	Ismail Naurdiev	Decision (unanimous)	Elite MMA Championship 5	September 5, 2020	3	5:00	Düsseldorf, Poland	EMC Welterweight Grand Prix Semifinal.
Win	7–1	Michał Golasiński	TKO (punches)	Fight Exclusive Night 26	October 12, 2019	2	2:58	Wrocław, Poland	
Win	6–1	Aleksandr Udoviko	TKO (punches and elbows)	Bebson Arena 5	August 24, 2019	1	2:39	Bielawa, Poland	
Win	5–1	Łukasz Siwiec	TKO (knees)	Armia Fight Night 6	June 14, 2019	3	1:25	Radom, Poland	
Loss	4–1	Szymon Dusza	TKO (body kicks and punches)	Fight Exclusive Night 23	January 12, 2019	1	0:55	Lubin, Poland	
Win	4–0	Jacek Jędraszczyk	Submission (rear-naked choke)	Fight Exclusive Night 21	May 25, 2018	3	3:40	Wrocław, Poland	Fight of the Night.
Win	3–0	Adrian Błeszyński	Decision (unanimous)	Fight Exclusive Night 19	October 14, 2017	3	5:00	Wrocław, Poland	Welterweight debut.
Win	2–0	Arkadiusz Maziakowski	Submission (rear-naked choke)	Bebson Arena 2	October 29, 2016	3	N/A	Bielawa, Poland	Catchweight (194 lb) bout.
Win	1–0	Wojciech Balejko	Submission (rear-naked choke)	MMA Zabkowice Slaskie Fight Night 1	April 23, 2016	1	1:50	Ząbkowice Śląskie, Poland	Light Heavyweight debut.

== See also ==
- List of male mixed martial artists
- List of current Konfrontacja Sztuk Walki fighters
