= Babilon MMA =

MMA promoter based in Poland

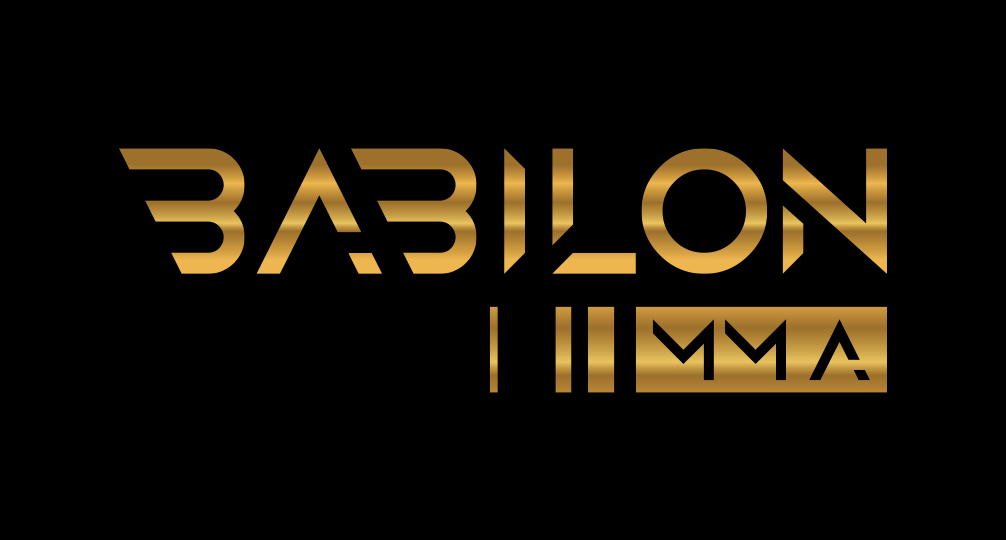
- Sport: Mixed martial arts promotion
- Founded: 2017; 9 years ago
- Founder: Tomasz Babiloński; Przemysław Krok
- Owner: Private
- Countries: Poland
- Website: babilonmma.pl

Babilon MMA is a Polish mixed martial arts, K-1, and Boxing promotion based in Poland.

== History ==
Tomasz Babiloński, a known boxing promoter in Poland, alongside Przemysław Krok founded Babilon MMA in 2017. The first event took place on August 18, 2017, in Międzyzdroje, and was dubbed: Babilon MMA 1: Seaside Fight.

On December 15, 2018, the first fight for a championship belt took place between Paweł Pawlak and Daniel Skibiński for the vacant Welterweight championship (up to 77 kg). Skibiński won the fight by Unanimous Decision.

Some of their main sponsors include, Grupa Azoty, Tauron Polska Energia, Polska Grupa Energetyczna (PGE), KGHM Polska Miedź, and Polsat, the last of which broadcast their events.

In September 2019, Tomasz Babiloński announced cooperation with Fight Exclusive Night, which took place on October 26 at Babilon MMA 10: Underground Circle in the Wieliczka Salt Mine, where in the main fight Babilon MMA Featherweight champion Daniel Rutkowski faced FEN Featherweight champion Adrian Zieliński for both organizations belts. Rutkowski won the fight by Unanimous Decision, winning both the Babilon and FEN Featherweight championships in the process. Over a year later on November 28, 2020, the two rematched, this time under the FEN banner at FEN 31: Lotos Fight Night Łódź. The bout was initially supposed to be for both championships once again, but Zieliński weighed in 1.4 kg over the weight limit, which led to the bout proceeding as a non-title fight. Rutkowski won the rematch by yet another Unanimous Decision.

On September 18, 2022, Babilon MMA began cooperation with local federation Carpathian Warriors, which is based in the Subcarpathian Voivodeship. On October 1 of the same year, Carpathian Warriors put on an event dubbed: Carpathian Warriors 10: Road to Babilon, on which took place 14 fights. The best winners from the event were expected to be signed to Babilon MMA and compete on a future event. Of all the winners, only one fighter (Patryk Ożóg) earned a contract.

=== Babilon Boxing ===
With co-founder Tomasz Babiloński's background as a boxing promoter, the federation put together the first Babilon Boxing event, which to place at the same time as Babilon MMA 8: Babilon Fight Night 1 on May 31, 2019. In the main event, Michał Cieślak faced Olanrewaju Durodola for the vacant Republic of Poland International Cruiserweight championship. Cieślak won the fight by a second-round TKO.

== List of Babilon MMA events ==
=== Past events ===
No.	Event	Date	Venue	Location
1	Babilon MMA 1: Seaside Fight	August 18, 2017	Amfiteatr Międzyzdroje	Międzyzdroje, Poland
2	Babilon MMA 2: Kołecki vs. Orkowski	December 2, 2017	Arena Legionowo	Legionowo, Poland
3	Babilon MMA 3: Kołecki vs. Borowski	March 16, 2018	Hala MOSiR	Radom, Poland
4	Babilon MMA 4: Kołecki vs. Cuk	June 8, 2018	Hala MOSiR	Ełk, Poland
5	Babilon MMA 5: Skibiński vs. Melillo	August 18, 2018	Amfiteatr Międzyzdroje	Międzyzdroje, Poland
6	Babilon MMA 6: Pawlak vs. Skibiński	December 15, 2018	Centrum Sportu Raszyn	Raszyn, Poland
7	Babilon MMA 7: Kita vs. Głuchowski	January 25, 2019	Aqua Żyrardów	Żyrardów, Poland
8	Babilon MMA 8: Babilon Fight Night 1	May 31, 2019	Arena Pruszków	Pruszków, Poland
9	Babilon MMA 9: Kita vs. Oliveira	August 16, 2019	Amfiteatr Międzyzdroje	Międzyzdroje, Poland
10	Babilon MMA 10: Podziemny Krąg	October 26, 2019	Wieliczka Salt Mine	Wieliczka, Poland
11	Babilon MMA 11: Skibiński vs. Nalgiev	December 13, 2019	Hala MOSiR	Radom, Poland
12	Babilon MMA 12: Pawlak vs. Błeszyński	February 7, 2020	Hala im. Olimpijczyków Polskich	Łomża, Poland
13	Babilon MMA 13: Live in Studio	May 29, 2020	Goliat Security Building	Radom, Poland
14	Babilon MMA 14: Live in Studio	June 26, 2020	Goliat Security Building	Radom, Poland
15	Babilon MMA 15: Skibiński vs. Medvedovski	August 28, 2020	Hotel Ossa Conference & SPA	Biała Rawska, Poland
16	Babilon MMA 16: Rutkowski vs. Runge	September 25, 2020	Arena Legionowo	Legionowo, Poland
17	Babilon MMA 17: Żółtaszek vs. Valtonen	October 30, 2020	Goliat Security Building	Radom, Poland
18	Babilon MMA 18: Revenge	November 27, 2020	Explosion Club	Warsaw, Poland
19	Babilon MMA 19: Stawowy vs. Szaflarski	February 12, 2021	Explosion Club	Warsaw, Poland
20	Babilon MMA 20: Śmiełowski vs. Gutowski	March 26, 2021	Explosion Club	Warsaw, Poland
21	Babilon MMA 21: Pawlak vs. Guzev	April 30, 2021	Explosion Club	Warsaw, Poland
22	Babilon MMA 22: Błeszyński vs. Wawrzyniak	May 22, 2021	Fort Sokolnickiego	Warsaw, Poland
23	Babilon MMA 23: Stawowy vs. Valtonen	June 25, 2021	Hotel Mazurkas Conference Center	Ożarów Mazowiecki, Poland
24	Babilon MMA 24: Niedzielski vs. Vulchin	September 11, 2021	Aqua Żyrardów	Żyrardów, Poland
25	Babilon MMA 25: Kacprzak vs. Gutowski	October 8, 2021	Hala im. Olimpijczyków Polskich	Łomża, Poland
26	Babilon MMA 26: Wawrzyniak vs. Łopaczyk	November 12, 2021	Hotel Mazurkas Conference Center	Ożarów Mazowiecki, Poland
27	Babilon MMA 27: Sudolski vs. Pasternak	January 28, 2022	Hala OSiR	Skierniewice, Poland
28	Babilon MMA 28: Wawrzyniak vs. Łaguna	June 3, 2022	Miejska Hala Lodowa	Nowy Targ, Poland
29	Babilon MMA 29: Kacprzak vs. Zorczykowski	June 10, 2022	Radom Sports Center	Radom, Poland
30	Babilon MMA 30: Sudolski vs. Macedo	July 8, 2022	Amfiteatr Międzyzdroje	Międzyzdroje, Poland
31	Babilon MMA 31: Błeszyński vs. Zimmer	October 28, 2022	Hala Widowiskowo-Sportowa	Grodzisk Mazowiecki, Poland
32	Babilon MMA 32: Rusiński vs. Siwiec	November 11, 2022	Hala MOSiR	Radom, Poland
33	Babilon MMA 33: Skrzek vs. Wyroślak	December 10, 2022	Hotel Mazurkas Conference Center	Ożarów Mazowiecki, Poland
34	Babilon MMA 34: Kacprzak vs. Mendlewski	January 27, 2023	Aqua Żyrardów	Żyrardów, Poland
35	Babilon MMA 35: Wawrzyniak vs. Błeszyński 2	April 21, 2023	Hala MCKiS	Jaworzno, Poland
36	Babilon MMA 36: Łaguna vs. Kouadja	June 10, 2023	Hala im. Arkadiusza Gołasia	Ostrołęka, Poland
37	Babilon MMA 37: Sianos vs. Dubiela	July 28, 2023	Amfiteatr Międzyzdroje	Międzyzdroje, Poland
38	Babilon MMA 38: Łopaczyk vs. Jakimowicz	September 22, 2023	Hala MOSiR	Chełm, Poland
39	Babilon MMA 39: Kacprzak vs. Rakowicz	September 30, 2023	Hala MOSiR	Radom, Poland
40	Babilon MMA 40: Lamparski vs. Makarowski	October 7, 2023	Wieliczka Salt Mine	Wieliczka, Poland
41	Babilon MMA 41: Błeszyński vs. Tomczak	November 24, 2023	Hala BKS Stal	Bielsko-Biała, Poland
42	Babilon MMA 42: Gładkowicz vs. Zając	January 27, 2024	Aqua Żyrardów	Żyrardów, Poland
43	Babilon MMA 43: Makarowski vs. Mendlewski 2	March 22, 2024	Hala OSiR	Skierniewice, Poland
44	Babilon MMA 44: Lamparski vs. Martinez	March 23, 2024	Hala MCKiS	Jaworzno, Poland
45	Babilon MMA 45: Rakowicz vs. Polityło	June 1, 2024	Miejska Hala Lodowa	Nowy Targ, Poland
46	Babilon MMA 46: Sianos vs. Thompson	August 9, 2024	Amfiteatr Międzyzdroje	Międzyzdroje, Poland
47	Babilon MMA 47: Dudek vs. Hunanyan	September 28, 2024	Wieliczka Salt Mine	Wieliczka, Poland
48	Babilon MMA 48: Błeszyński vs. Vogt	October 12, 2024	Arena Sosnowiec	Sosnowiec, Poland
49	Babilon MMA 49: Polityło vs. Majdan	November 22, 2024	Hala MOSiR	Radom, Poland
50	Babilon MMA 50: Mendlewski vs. Lamparski	December 7, 2024	Hotel Mazurkas Conference Center	Ożarów Mazowiecki, Poland
51	Babilon MMA 51: Kołecki vs. Mysiala	March 14, 2025	Hala MOSiR	Ciechanów, Poland
52	Babilon MMA 52: Mendlewski vs. Skrzek	May 17, 2025	Miejska Hala Lodowa	Nowy Targ, Poland
53	Babilon MMA 53: Kołecki vs. Łazarz	July 18, 2025	Amfiteatr Międzyzdroje	Międzyzdroje, Poland
54	Babilon MMA 54: Błachuta vs. Szczęsny	September 27, 2025	Hala Widowiskowo-Sportowa	Grudziądz, Poland
55	Babilon MMA 55: Łazarz vs. Kołecki 2	November 21, 2025	Radom Sports Center	Radom, Poland
56	Babilon MMA 56: Głowacki vs. Silva	January 31, 2026	Aqua Żyrardów	Żyrardów, Poland
57	Babilon MMA 57: Kołecki vs. Austin	March 27, 2026	Hala MOSiR	Ciechanów, Poland
58	Babilon MMA 58: Dudek vs. Melhuish	June 19, 2026	Amfiteatr Parku Strzeleckiego	Nowy Sacz, Poland
59	Babilon MMA 59: Sianos vs. Mysiala	July 24, 2026	Amfiteatr Międzyzdroje	Międzyzdroje, Poland
60	Babilon MMA 60: Błachuta vs. Norkus	September 26, 2026	Hala OSiR	Skierniewice, Poland
61	Babilon MMA 61: Włodarczyk vs. Sianos	October 24, 2026	Radom Sports Center	Radom, Poland

=== Event locations ===
- The following cities have hosted a total of 61 Babilon MMA events as of Babilon MMA 61: Włodarczyk vs. Sianos (10.24.2026.)
Poland (total: 61)
- Masovian Voivodeship, (33)
  - Radom, Hala MOSiR (5)
  - Żyrardów, Aqua Żyrardów (5)
  - Ożarów Mazowiecki, Hotel Mazurkas Conference Center (4)
  - Warsaw, Explosion Club (4)
  - Radom, Goliat Security Building (3)
  - Radom, Radom Sports Center (3)
  - Ciechanów, Hala MOSiR (2)
  - Legionowo, Arena Legionowo (2)
  - Grodzisk Mazowiecki, Hala Widowiskowo-Sportowa (1)
  - Ostrołęka, Hala im. Arkadiusza Gołasia (1)
  - Pruszków, Arena Pruszków (1)
  - Raszyn, Centrum Sportu Raszyn (1)
  - Warsaw, Fort Sokolnickiego (1)
- Lesser Poland Voivodeship, (7)
  - Nowy Targ, Miejska Hala Lodowa (3)
  - Wieliczka, Wieliczka Salt Mine (3)
  - Nowy Sacz, Amfiteatr Parku Strzeleckiego (1)
- West Pomeranian Voivodeship, (8)
  - Międzyzdroje, Amfiteatr Międzyzdroje (8)
- Silesian Voivodeship, (4)
  - Jaworzno, Hala MCKiS (2)
  - Bielsko-Biała, Hala BKS Stal (1)
  - Sosnowiec, Arena Sosnowiec (1)
- Łódź Voivodeship, (4)
  - Skierniewice, Hala OSiR (3)
  - Biała Rawska, Hotel Ossa Conference & SPA (1)
- Podlaskie Voivodeship, (2)
  - Łomża, Hala im. Olimpijczyków Polskich (2)
- Kuyavian-Pomeranian Voivodeship, (1)
  - Grudziądz, Hala Widowiskowo-Sportowa (1)
- Lublin Voivodeship, (1)
  - Chełm, Hala MOSiR (1)
- Warmian-Masurian Voivodeship, (1)
  - Ełk, Hala MOSiR (1)

== Current champions ==
=== Men ===
Category	Champion	Since	Number of defenses
Heavyweight-120 kg (264.6 lb; 18.9 st)	(Poland) Szymon Kołecki	March 27, 2026; Babilon MMA 57	—N/a
Light Heavyweight-93 kg (205.0 lb; 14.6 st)	(Poland) Szymon Kołecki	November 21, 2025; Babilon MMA 55	—N/a
Middleweight-84 kg (185.2 lb; 13.2 st)	(N/A) Vacant	—N/a	—N/a
Welterweight-77 kg (169.8 lb; 12.1 st)	(N/A) Vacant	—N/a	—N/a
Lightweight-70 kg (154.3 lb; 11.0 st)	(N/A) Vacant	—N/a	—N/a
Featherweight-66 kg (145.5 lb; 10.4 st)	(N/A) Vacant	—N/a	—N/a
Bantamweight-61 kg (134.5 lb; 9.6 st)	(N/A) Vacant	—N/a	—N/a

== Championship History ==
=== MMA ===
==== Heavyweight ====
120 kg (264.6 lb; 18.9 st)

No.	Name	Event	Date	Defenses
1	(England) Oli Thompson def. Marcin Sianos	Babilon MMA 46; Międzyzdroje, Poland	August 9, 2024	—N/a
Thompson vacated the championship after losing a non-title bout to Szymon Kołecki (Babilon MMA 50) and refused a rematch which he had until March 2025 to make a decision.
2	(Poland) Szymon Kołecki def. Stuart Austin	Babilon MMA 57; Ciechanów, Poland	March 27, 2026	—N/a

==== Light Heavyweight ====
93 kg (205.0 lb; 14.6 st)

No.	Name	Event	Date	Defenses
1	(Poland) Łukasz Sudolski def. Ederson Cristian Macedo	Babilon MMA 30; Międzyzdroje, Poland	July 8, 2022	—N/a
Belt vacated after Sudolski fulfilled his contract with Babilon MMA and signed for KSW
2	(Poland) Szymon Kołecki def. Marcin Łazarz	Babilon MMA 55; Radom, Poland	November 21, 2025	—N/a

==== Middleweight ====
84 kg (185.2 lb; 13.2 st)

No.	Name	Event	Date	Defenses
1	(Poland) Paweł Pawlak def. Adrian Błeszyński	Babilon MMA 18; Warsaw, Poland	November 27, 2020	1. def. Sergey Guzev at Babilon MMA 21 on April 31, 2021 in Warsaw, Poland
Belt vacated after Pawlak fulfilled his contract with Babilon MMA and signed for KSW
2	(Poland) Piotr Wawrzyniak def. Adam Łaguna	Babilon MMA 28; Nowy Targ, Poland	June 13, 2020	1. def. Adrian Błeszyński at Babilon MMA 35 on April 31, 2021, in Jaworzno, Poland
interim	(Poland) Adrian Błeszyński def. Filip Tomczak	Babilon MMA 41; Bielsko-Biała, Poland	November 24, 2023	—N/a
Belt vacated after Wawrzyniak fulfilled his contract with Babilon MMA and signed for Oktagon MMA
3	(Poland) Adrian Błeszyński promoted to undisputed champion	—	December 27, 2023	1. def. Samuel Vogt at Babilon MMA 48 on October 12, 2024, in Sosnowiec, Poland
Belt vacated after Błeszyński willingly relinquished the title during Babilon MMA 58: Dudek vs. Melhuish

==== Welterweight ====
77 kg (169.8 lb; 12.1 st)

No.	Name	Event	Date	Defenses
1	(Poland) Daniel Skibiński def. Paweł Pawlak	Babilon MMA 6 Raszyn, Poland	December 15, 2018	1. def. Lom-Ali Nalgiev at Babilon MMA 11 on December 13, 2019 in Radom, Poland; 2. def. Kirill Medvedovski at Babilon MMA 15 on August 28, 2020 in Biała Rawska, Poland
Belt vacated after Skibiński fulfilled his contract with Babilon MMA
2	(Poland) Łukasz Siwiec def. Konrad Rusiński	Babilon MMA 32; Radom, Poland	November, 2022	—N/a
interim	(Poland) Tymoteusz Łopaczyk def. Marek Jakimowicz	Babilon MMA 38; Chełm, Poland	September 22, 2023	—N/a
Belt vacated after Siwiec left Babilon MMA and signed for Oktagon MMA
3	(Poland) Tymoteusz Łopaczyk promoted to undisputed champion	—	September 22, 2023	—N/a
Belt vacated after Łopaczyk fulfilled his contract with Babilon MMA and signed for KSW

==== Lightweight ====
70 kg (154.3 lb; 11.0 st)

No.	Name	Event	Date	Defenses
1	(Poland) Piotr Niedzielski def. Ivan Vulchin	Babilon MMA 24; Żyrardów, Poland	September 11, 2021	—N/a
Belt vacated after Niedzielski fulfilled his contract with Babilon MMA and signed for Bellator MMA
2	(Poland) Mateusz Makarowski def. Filip Lamparski	Babilon MMA 40; Wieliczka, Poland	October 7, 2023	—N/a
3	(Poland) Krzysztof Mendlewski	Babilon MMA 43; Skierniewice, Poland	March 22, 2024	1. def. Filip Lamparski at Babilon MMA 50 on December 7, 2024, in Ożarów Mazowiecki, Poland; 2. def. Marcin Skrzek at Babilon MMA 52 on May 17, 2025, in Nowy Targ, Poland
Belt vacated after Mendlewski fulfilled his contract with Babilon MMA and signed for KSW

==== Featherweight ====
66 kg (145.5 lb; 10.4 st)

No.	Name	Event	Date	Defenses
1	(Poland) Daniel Rutkowski def. Damian Zorczykowski	Babilon MMA 8 Pruszków, Poland	May 31, 2019	1. def. Adrian Zieliński at Babilon MMA 10 on October 26, 2019 in Wieliczka, Poland
Belt vacated after Rutkowski fulfilled his contract with Babilon MMA and signed for KSW
2	(Poland) Piotr Kacprzak def. Damian Zorczykowski	Babilon MMA 29; Radom, Poland	June 10, 2022	1. def. Krzysztof Mendlewski at Babilon MMA 34 on January 27, 2023, in Żyrardów, Poland
3	(Poland) Szymon Rakowicz	Babilon MMA 39; Radom, Poland	September 30, 2023	—N/a
4	(Poland) Paweł Polityło	Babilon MMA 45; Nowy Targ, Poland	June 1, 2024	1. def. Błażej Majdan at Babilon MMA 49 on November 22, 2024, in Radom, Poland
Belt vacated after Rutkowski fulfilled his contract with Babilon MMA and signed for Fight Nation Championship

==== Bantamweight ====
61 kg (134.5 lb; 9.6 st)

No.	Name	Event	Date	Defenses

==== Flyweight ====
56 kg (123.5 lb; 8.8 st)

No.	Name	Event	Date	Defenses

== Staff ==
Current members	Function	Former members
Tomasz Babiloński	Owner	-
Artur Gwóźdź	Matchmaker	-
Krzysztof Skrzypek	Ring announcer	-
Tomasz Marciniak	Commentary	-
Paweł Wyrobek	Commentary	-
Artur Łukaszewski	Studio host	Jakub Jędryka
Igor Marczak	Post-fight interviewer	-
Edward Durda	Host of the weighing ceremonies	-

== Notable fighters ==
Poland

- (Poland) Michał Andryszak
- (Poland) Iwo Baraniewski
- (Poland) Kacper Formela
- (Poland) Bartłomiej Gładkowicz
- (Poland) Krzysztof Głowacki
- (Poland) Adrian Gunia
- (Poland) Rafał Haratyk
- (Poland) Marcin Jabłoński
- (Poland) Patryk Kaczmarczyk
- (Poland) Szymon Kołecki
- (Poland) Kamil Kraska
- (Poland) Dawid Kuczmarski
- (Poland) Denis Labryga
- (Poland) Tymoteusz Łopaczyk
- (Poland) Jan Lodzik
- (Poland) Piotr Niedzielski
- (Poland) Paweł Pawlak
- (Poland) Marcel Piersa
- (Poland) Damian Piwowarczyk
- (Poland) Daniel Rutkowski
- (Poland) Daniel Skibiński
- (Poland) Paulina Wiśniewska
- (Poland) Sergiusz Zając

Ukraine

- (Ukraine) Oleksandr Moisa
- (Ukraine) Ekaterina Shakalova

Other

- (Croatia) Mladen Kujundžić
- (England) Oli Thompson
