= Ismail Naurdiev =

Austrian-Moroccan mixed martial arts fighter

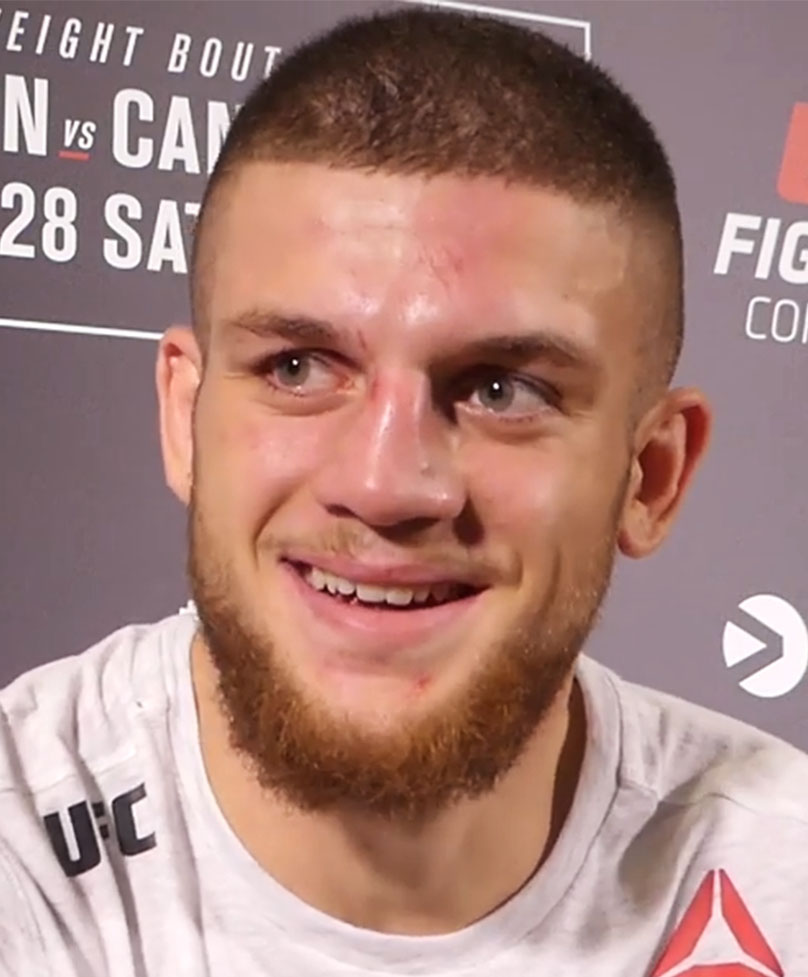
- Ismail Naurdiev at UFC Fight Night 160 in Copenhagen
- Born: 18 August 1996 (age 30); Grozny, Chechnya, Russia
- Native name: Исмаил Наурдиев
- Other names: The Austrian Wonderboy
- Nationality: Austrian; Moroccan (since 2024)
- Height: 6 ft 0 in (1.83 m)
- Weight: 185 lb (84 kg; 13 st 3 lb)
- Division: Welterweight (2012–2020); Super welterweight (2021–2022); Middleweight (2023–present)
- Reach: 74 in (188 cm)
- Style: Wrestling
- Fighting out of: Rabat, Morocco
- Team: Top Team Salzburg
- Years active: 2012–present

Mixed martial arts record
- Total: 34
- Wins: 26
- By knockout: 13
- By submission: 6
- By decision: 7
- Losses: 8
- By knockout: 2
- By submission: 2
- By decision: 4

Other information
- Mixed martial arts record from Sherdog

Ismail Naurdiev (Russian: Исмаил Наурдиев; born 18 August 1996) is an Austrian and Moroccan mixed martial artist who currently competes in the Middleweight division of the Ultimate Fighting Championship (UFC). He formerly competed in the Super Welterweight division of Brave Combat Federation and Absolute Championship Berkut (ACB).

== Early life ==
Naurdiev was born in Grozny, Chechnya, Russia and his family left the war-torn city and moved to Austria in 2004 for a safe and better life. He started training in wrestling and transitioned to MMA when he was a teenager. At the beginning of his MMA professional career, Naurdiev did not have any trainers or sparring partners but would accept every fight offered to him for experience.

Yes, [I have] only Austrian [citizenship]. I speak to the UFC only to fight under the flag of Austria, because this country has given me everything. I give them credit. I feel good in Austria, but I do not forget my roots.

== Mixed martial arts career ==
=== Early career ===
Naurdiev fought in the European-based promotions, notably Absolute Championship Akhmat (ACA), formally known as Absolute Championship Berkut (ACB), and amassed a record of 17–2 prior to joining UFC.

=== Ultimate Fighting Championship ===
Naurdiev made his promotional debut at UFC Fight Night: Błachowicz vs. Santos on 23 February 2019. He faced Michel Prazeres, replacing injured Ramazan Emeev, and won the fight by unanimous decision.

On 6 July 2019, Naurdiev faced Chance Rencountre at UFC 239. He lost the fight via unanimous decision.

Naurdiev next faced Siyar Bahadurzada at UFC Fight Night: Hermansson vs. Cannonier on 28 September 2019. He won the fight via unanimous decision.

Naurdiev faced Sean Brady on 29 February 2020, at UFC Fight Night 169. He lost the fight via unanimous decision.

On 19 March 2020, it was reported that Naurdiev parted way with UFC. Later, Naurdiev elaborated that after fighting out his four-fight rookie contract with a record of 2–2, the organization was not interested in re-signing him.

=== Post-UFC career ===
On 24 August 2020, news surfaced that Naurdiev had signed with Elite MMA Championship and was expected to make his promotional debut in the promotion's welterweight grand prix at EMC 5 on 5 September 2020. He faced Tymoteusz Łopaczyk and won the fight via unanimous decision, advancing to the grand prix final.

In the final, Naurdiev was expected to face Amiran Gogoladze at EMC 6 on 31 October 2020. However, Naurdiev withdrew from the bout due to an injury prior to the whole event being postponed due to the COVID-19 pandemic.

=== Brave Combat Federation ===
On 26 February 2021, Naurdiev announced that he signed a multi-fight contract with Brave Combat Federation. Subsequently, it was announced that Naurdiev will be challenging Jarrah Al-Silawi for the BRAVE CF Super Welterweight Championship at Brave CF 50 on 1 April 2021. He lost in the second round after he injured his leg from a kick.

Naurdiev faced Olli Santalahti on 25 September 2021, at Brave CF 54. He won the bout via unanimous decision.

Naurdiev faced Bekten Zheenbekov on 18 June 2022 at Brave CF 59. He won the bout via TKO stoppage in the first round.

Naurdiev faced Marcin Bandel for the vacant Brave CF Super Welterweight Championship at Brave CF 63. He lost the bout in the first round after being dropped by Bandel and submitted with an armbar.

Naurdiev looked to rebound against Vadim Kutsyi on 17 December 2022 at Brave CF 68, however he lost the bout via TKO stoppage in the first round.

Naurdiev moved up to Middleweight and faced Tahar Hadbi on 8 December 2023 at Brave CF 79, winning the bout via guillotine choke in the first round.

=== Return to UFC ===
Naurdiev faced Bruno Silva on 26 October 2024, at UFC 308. He won the fight by unanimous decision.

Naurdiev was scheduled to face Jun Yong Park on 17 May 2025, at UFC Fight Night 256. However, for unknown reasons, the bout was rescheduled to UFC on ABC 8 which took place on 21 June. After Naurdiev was deduced two points due to an illegal knee, he lost the fight by unanimous decision.

Naurdiev faced Ryan Loder on 22 November 2025, at UFC Fight Night 265. He won the fight by knockout in the first round.

Naurdiev was scheduled to face Marvin Vettori on 27 June 2026 at UFC Fight Night 280. However, Vettori withdrew due to a rib injury, so the bout was scrapped. The bout was rescheduled to 3 October 2026 at UFC 332. Naurdiev won the fight by unanimous decision.

== Personal life ==
Naurdiev earned his moniker "The Austrian Wonderboy" due to his flashy, stylist and wild spinning kicks skills.

== Championships and accomplishments ==
=== Mixed martial arts ===
- Ultimate Fighting Championship
  - UFC.com Awards
    - 2019: Ranked #6 Newcomer of the Year & Ranked #7 Upset of the Year vs. Michel Prazeres
- Absolute Championship Berkut
  - Knockout of the Night (One time) vs. Andrei Vasinca
- Aggrelin
  - AG Welterweight Championship (One time)
- World Freefight Challenge
  - Knockout of the Night (One time) vs. Daniel Skibiński

== Mixed martial arts record ==
Professional record breakdown
34 matches	26 wins	8 losses
By knockout	13	2
By submission	6	2
By decision	7	4

Res.	Record	Opponent	Method	Event	Date	Round	Time	Location	Notes
Win	26–8	Marvin Vettori	Decision (unanimous)	UFC 332	3 October 2026	3	5:00	Salt Lake City, Utah, United States	
Win	25–8	Ryan Loder	KO (punch)	UFC Fight Night: Tsarukyan vs. Hooker	22 November 2025	1	1:26	Al Rayyan, Qatar	
Loss	24–8	Park Jun-yong	Decision (unanimous)	UFC on ABC: Hill vs. Rountree Jr.	21 June 2025	3	5:00	Baku, Azerbaijan	Naurdiev was deducted two points in round 2 due to an illegal knee.
Win	24–7	Bruno Silva	Decision (unanimous)	UFC 308	26 October 2024	3	5:00	Abu Dhabi, United Arab Emirates	
Win	23–7	Tahar Hadbi	Submission (guillotine choke)	Brave CF 79	8 December 2023	1	1:10	Isa Town, Bahrain	Middleweight debut.
Loss	22–7	Vadym Kutsyi	TKO (punches)	Brave CF 68	17 December 2022	1	3:23	Düsseldorf, Germany	
Loss	22–6	Marcin Bandel	Submission (armbar)	Brave CF 63	19 October 2022	1	1:20	Isa Town, Bahrain	For the vacant Brave CF Super Welterweight Championship.
Win	22–5	Bekten Zheenbekov	TKO (punches)	Brave CF 59	18 June 2022	1	2:26	Bukhara, Uzbekistan	
Win	21–5	Olli Santalahti	Decision (unanimous)	Brave CF 54	25 September 2021	3	5:00	Konin, Poland	
Loss	20–5	Jarrah Al-Silawi	TKO (leg kicks)	Brave CF 50	1 April 2021	2	1:19	Arad, Bahrain	Super Welterweight debut. For the Brave CF Super Welterweight Championship.
Win	20–4	Tymoteusz Łopaczyk	Decision (unanimous)	Elite MMA Championship 5	5 September 2020	3	5:00	Düsseldorf, Germany	EMC Welterweight Grand Prix Semifinal.
Loss	19–4	Sean Brady	Decision (unanimous)	UFC Fight Night: Benavidez vs. Figueiredo	29 February 2020	3	5:00	Norfolk, Virginia, United States	
Win	19–3	Siyar Bahadurzada	Decision (unanimous)	UFC Fight Night: Hermansson vs. Cannonier	28 September 2019	3	5:00	Copenhagen, Denmark	
Loss	18–3	Chance Rencountre	Decision (unanimous)	UFC 239	6 July 2019	3	5:00	Las Vegas, Nevada, United States	
Win	18–2	Michel Prazeres	Decision (unanimous)	UFC Fight Night: Błachowicz vs. Santos	23 February 2019	3	5:00	Prague, Czech Republic	
Win	17–2	Paulistenio Rocha	TKO (punches)	X Fight Nights 16	2 February 2019	1	0:36	Vienna, Austria	
Win	16–2	Georgi Valentinov	KO (spinning wheel kick and punches)	ACB 74	18 November 2017	1	3:10	Vienna, Austria	
Loss	15–2	Ismael de Jesus	Decision (unanimous)	ACB 70	23 September 2017	3	5:00	Sheffield, England	
Win	15–1	Ben Alloway	KO (kick to the body)	ACB 60	13 May 2017	1	2:24	Vienna, Austria	
Win	14–1	Andrei Vasinca	TKO (knee and punches)	ACB 52	21 January 2017	1	1:28	Vienna, Austria	Knockout of the Night.
Win	13–1	Lászlò Szögyényi	TKO (punches)	World Freefight Challenge 21	17 December 2016	2	1:49	Bad Voeslau, Austria	
Win	12–1	Garik Shahbabyan	Submission (arm-triangle choke)	Aggrelin 14	16 October 2016	2	2:41	Salzburg, Austria	Won the Aggrelin Welterweight Championship.
Win	11–1	Daniel Skibiński	KO (knee)	World Freefight Challenge 20	27 August 2016	1	0:40	Bad Vöslau, Austria	Knockout of the Night.
Win	10–1	David Mate	TKO (punches)	KraftHerr Fight Night 1	27 February 2016	1	1:15	St. Polten, Austria	
Win	9–1	Leonardo D'Auria	TKO (punches)	Austrian Fight Challenge 2	12 December 2015	1	N/A	Vienna, Austria	
Win	8–1	Asmir Sadiković	Submission (triangle choke)	NAAFS: Europe	6 December 2015	2	1:03	Split, Croatia	
Win	7–1	Mikko Ahmala	TKO (punches and elbows)	CAGE 30	16 May 2015	1	2:27	Leonding, Austria	
Win	6–1	Adnan Hadzic	Submission (rear-naked choke)	Fight Night Leonding 3	11 April 2015	1	1:28	Leonding, Austria	
Win	5–1	Ibo Can	TKO (punches)	Charity Fight Night 2	20 September 2014	1	2:00	Dornbirn, Austria	
Loss	4–1	Cem Kaya	Submission (triangle choke)	German MMA Championship 5	9 December 2012	1	0:40	Castrop-Rauxel, Germany	Catchweight (176 lb) bout.
Win	4–0	Uros Pavlovic	TKO (punches)	Salzburger MMA Challenge 2	26 April 2014	1	N/A	Salzburg, Austria	
Win	3–0	Robert Oganesyan	Submission (rear-naked choke)	Fight Night Linz 4	9 December 2014	1	4:26	Leonding, Austria	
Win	2–0	Abdul Shaliqhi	Submission (rear-naked choke)	Respect Austria 1	2 February 2013	1	3:00	Freistadt, Austria	
Win	1–0	Alic Eldridz	Decision (unanimous)	King of the Ring: Austria	17 November 2012	3	5:00	Salzburg, Austria	Welterweight debut.

== See also ==
- List of current Brave CF fighters
- List of male mixed martial artists
