= Adrian Gunia =

Polish kickboxer (born 2000)

- Born: 3 November 2000 (age 25); Starachowice, Poland
- Nationality: Polish
- Height: 1.78 m (5 ft 10 in)
- Weight: 67.9 kg (150 lb; 10 st 10 lb)
- Style: Muay Thai
- Stance: Orthodox
- Fighting out of: Warsaw, Poland
- Team: Palestra Warszawa
- Years active: 2023 - present

Kickboxing record
- Total: 17
- Wins: 16
- By knockout: 5
- Losses: 1
- By knockout: 0
- Draws: 0

Adrian Gunia (born 3 November 2000) is a Polish kickboxer.

== Professional career ==
His first three fights are unknown, and almost no information on those three exist on the internet.

Gunia's first registered fight came on November 25, 2023 where he faced off against Karol Kopryjaniuk. He would win the fight via a Doctor Stoppage in the second round, and thus bringing his record up to 4–0.

His next fight would come three months later where he faced off against Italo Julio. He would win the fight via Unanimous Decision.

He would return exactly a month later to face off against Czech fighter Erik Breit. He would yet again win via another Unanimous Decision.

He would return three weeks later for his third fight in three months. He faced off against Rafael Hudson, where he would suffer his first defeat after a Split Decision, thus bringing his record down to 6–1.

After a four month hiatus, Gunia would return in a fight against Kamil Siemaszko. Gunia would reenter the win column after scoring a Unanimous Decision Win, and thus improving his record to 7–1.

He would return four months later under Babilon MMA on the undercard of Babilon MMA 50, where he took on Turkish fighter Mert Aslan whom he would beat via Unanimous Decision and improving his win streak to two, and his record to 8–1.

Gunia would return to the ring just over a month later, where he fought Portuguese fighter Gustavo Oliveira. He would win by yet another Unanimous Decision, and thus moving up to 9–1.

His next fight would come two months later, where he took on Brazil's fighter Antônio Marcos Da Silva. He would win yet again by yet another Unanimous Decision, and now improving his record to 10–1.

Following a seven-month hiatus, Gunia returned on October 4, 2025 against Mateusz Rajewski. Gunia won the fight via a Split Decision.

He returned three weeks later against Cezary Żugaj Jr. Gunia won the fight via a second-round doctor stoppage.

He returned three months later on January 17, 2026, against Arnaldo Moska. Gunia won the fight via a first-round TKO.

== Personal life ==
Gunia trains out of Palestra Team, and is also a Muay Thai coach.

== Muay Thai and K-1 record ==
Professional kickboxing record
16 wins (5 (T)KOs), 1 loss, 0 draws
Date	Result	Opponent	Event	Location	Method	Round	Time
2026-09-25	Win	(Hungary) Zalán Forgó	RFA 33	Bratislava, Slovakia	TKO (referee stoppage)	2	2:25
2026-05-22	Win	(Poland) Jakub Rajewski	NOC MMA 14	Turek, Poland	KO (punch)	1	2:17
Wins the Tuco Promotion Featherweight Title.
2026-03-07	Win	(Poland) Artur Felkner	NOC MMA 12	Koszalin, Poland	Decision (unanimous)	3	3:00
2026-01-17	Win	(Brazil) Arnaldo Moska	DWM Fight Night 7	Wieluń, Poland	TKO (3 knockdown rule)	1	1:49
2025-10-24	Win	(Poland) Cezary Żugaj Jr.	Gala Sportów Walki 15	Międzychód, Poland	TKO (doctor stoppage)	2	0:37
2025-10-04	Win	(Poland) Mateusz Rajewski	One Punch 4	Kartuzy, Poland	Decision (split)	3	3:00
2025-03-29	Win	(Brazil) Antônio Marcos Da Silva	DWM Fight Night 3	Białogard, Poland	Decision (unanimous)	3	3:00
2025-01-24	Win	(Portugal) Gustavo Oliveira	One Punch 2	Ostrowiec Świętokrzyski, Poland	Decision (unanimous)	3	3:00
2024-12-07	Win	(Turkey) Mert Aslan	Babilon MMA 50	Ożarów Mazowiecki, Poland	Decision (unanimous)	3	3:00
2024-08-23	Win	(Poland) Kamil Siemaszko	Hybrid MMA 5	Kołobrzeg, Poland	Decision (unanimous)	3	3:00
2024-04-05	Loss	(Brazil) Rafael Hudson	One Punch 1	Ostrowiec Świętokrzyski, Poland	Decision (split)	3	3:00
2024-03-15	Win	(Czech Republic) Erik Breit	Revolta 5: Robs Group Fight Night	Tczew, Poland	Decision (unanimous)	3	3:00
2024-02-16	Win	(Brazil) Italo Julio	Dragon Fight Night 6	Tłuszcz, Poland	Decision (unanimous)	3	3:00
2023-11-25	Win	(Poland) Karol Kopryjaniuk	Madness Cage Fighting 9	Ryki, Poland	TKO (doctor stoppage)	2	2:27
