= Marcel Piersa =

Polish kickboxer (born 2006)

- Born: 24 October 2006 (age 19); Ostrołęka, Poland
- Nationality: Polish
- Height: 1.76 m (5 ft 9 1/2 in)
- Weight: 69.7 kg (154 lb; 11 st 0 lb)
- Style: K-1
- Stance: Orthodox
- Fighting out of: Ostrołęka, Poland
- Team: Fight Academy Ostrołęka
- Years active: 2024–present

Kickboxing record
- Total: 1
- Wins: 1
- By knockout: 1
- Losses: 0
- By knockout: 0
- Draws: 0

Marcel Piersa (born 24 October 2006) is a Polish kickboxer.

== Amateur career ==
Piersa competed in many amateur tournaments, most notably in the WAKO Youth World Kickboxing Championships in Budapest, where he won a bronze medal in the -71 kg category.

== Professional career ==
Piersa made his professional debut on December 7, 2024, at the age of 18 against Eliasz Cholajda under Babilon MMA on the undercard of Babilon MMA 50. He beat Cholajda via TKO after a 3 knockdown rule.

Piersa was scheduled to face Paweł Konieczny on March 14, 2025 on the undercard of Babilon MMA 51. However, the fight was canceled for unknown reasons.

== Kickboxing and K-1 record ==
Professional kickboxing record
1 wins (1 (T)KOs), 0 losses, 0 draws
Date	Result	Opponent	Event	Location	Method	Round	Time
2024-12-07	Win	(Poland) Eliasz Cholajda	Babilon MMA 50	Ożarów Mazowiecki, Poland	TKO (3 knockdown rule)	3	2:22
