= Daniel Skibiński =

Polish mixed martial artist (born 1990)

- Born: Daniel Skibiński; August 28, 1990 (age 36); Ostrów Wielkopolski, Poland
- Other names: Skiba
- Height: 5 ft 11 in (1.80 m)
- Weight: 171 lb (78 kg; 12 st 3 lb)
- Division: Welterweight (2013–present); Middleweight (2016)
- Reach: 71.7 in (182 cm)
- Style: Wrestling
- Fighting out of: Ostrów Wielkopolski, Poland
- Team: Czerwony Smok
- Years active: 2013–present

Mixed martial arts record
- Total: 35
- Wins: 23
- By knockout: 7
- By submission: 3
- By decision: 13
- Losses: 12
- By knockout: 5
- By submission: 2
- By decision: 5

Other information
- Mixed martial arts record from Sherdog

Daniel Skibiński (born August 28, 1990) is a Polish professional mixed martial artist. He currently competes in the Welterweight division of Konfrontacja Sztuk Walki (KSW). He is the inaugural and former Babilon MMA Welterweight champion. Skibiński has previously competed on Cage Warriors and UAE Warriors.

== Mixed martial arts career ==
=== Early career ===
Skibiński made his professional debut on March 23, 2013 against Kamil Szymański. Skibiński lost the fight via a first-round submission.

=== Profesjonalna Liga MMA ===
After accumulating a career record of 1–1, Skibiński made his debut under Polish federation Profesjonalna Liga MMA (PLMMA) against Mariusz Radziszewski on November 15, 2013. Skibiński won the fight via a unanimous decision.

His next fight came on February 15, 2014 against Kamil Szymuszowski. Skibiński lost the fight via a unanimous decision.

=== Babilon MMA ===
After accumulating a career record of 8–5, Skibiński made his debut under Polish federation Babilon MMA during its inaugural event on August 18, 2017. He faced Łukasz Szczerek. Skibiński won the fight via a second-round submission.

=== VIP Fight Night at Five ===
Skibiński made his debut under Emirati federation VIP Fight Night at Five on November 3, 2017 against Islam Sayed. Skibiński won the fight via a first-round submission.

=== Return to Babilon MMA ===
Skibiński returned to Babilon MMA on March 16, 2018 against Davy Gallon. Skibiński won the fight via Unanimous Decision. This performance earned him a Fight of the Night bonus.

His next fight came on August 18, 2018 against Gianni Melillo. Skibiński won the fight via TKO 20 seconds into the fight. This performance earned him a Knockout of the Night bonus.

==== Babilon MMA Welterweight champion ====
Skibiński faced Paweł Pawlak for the inaugural Babilon MMA Welterweight championship on December 15, 2018. Skibiński won the fight via a unanimous decision, winning his first career championship in the process.

His first title defense was scheduled for May 31, 2019 against Zalimkhan Yusupov. Yusupov later withdrew from the bout, and was replace with Adriano Rodrigues. Due to the short notice and Rodrigues not being able to safely make weight on time, the bout proceeded as a non-title catchweight bout. Skibiński won the fight via a second-round TKO.

His first official title defense came on December 13, 2019 against Lom-Ali Nalgiev. Skibiński won the fight via a unanimous decision, successfully defending his title.

His second title defense was scheduled for August 28, 2020 against Carlo Prater. Prater later withdrew after testing positive for COVID-19. His new rival was Kirill Medvedovski. Skibiński won the fight via a first-round TKO, defending his championship in the process. This would mark Skibiński's final title defense and final appearance under Babilon MMA.

=== EFM Show ===
Skibiński made his debut on the inaugural EFM Show event against John Michael Sheil on April 9, 2021. Skibiński won the fight via a first-round TKO.

=== UAE Warriors ===
Skibiński made his debut under UAE Warriors on June 19, 2021 against Acoidan Duque. Skibiński won the fight via a third-round TKO.

His next fight came on October 29, 2021 against Tahir Abdullaev. Skibiński lost the fight via TKO 45 seconds into the fight.

=== Cage Warriors ===
Skibiński made his debut under Cage Warriors on April 1, 2022 against Justin Burlinson. Skibiński lost the fight via a second-round submission.

His next fight came on July 22, 2022 against Jim Wallhead. Skibiński lost the fight via a first-round TKO.

His next fight came on March 17, 2023 against Omiel Brown. Skibiński won the fight via a unanimous decision.

His final fight with the federation came on July 21, 2023 against Madars Fleminas. Skibiński lost the fight via a second-round TKO.

=== Hybrid MMA ===
Skibiński returned to his native Poland, fighting under local federation Hybrid MMA. He made his debut under the federation on December 16, 2023 against Alisson Marreira. Skibiński won the fight via a first-round TKO.

His next fight came on March 1, 2024 against Leonardo Damiani. Skibiński won the fight via a split decision.

=== Konfrontacja Sztuk Walki ===
On August 29, 2024, it was announced that Skibiński had signed with Konfrontacja Sztuk Walki (KSW). In his debut, he was scheduled to face Wiktor Zalewski, stepping in for an injured Madars Felminas. Zalewski later withdrew due to injury, and was replaced by Leonardo Damiani. This was a rematch between the two, following the controversial decision in the first bout. Skibiński won the rematch via yet another split decision.

His next fight came on January 25, 2025 against Muslim Tulshaev. Skibiński lost the fight via a first-round knockout.

His next fight came on August 9, 2025 against Oskar Szczepaniak. Skibiński won the fight via a second-round submission. This performance earned him a Submission of the Night bonus.

His next fight came on February 21, 2026 against Dawid Kuczmarski. Skibiński lost the fight via a Unanimous Decision.

=== King's Arena ===
Skibiński made his debut under King's Arena on May 30, 2026, against Mateusz Kisielewski. Skibiński lost the fight via a Unanimous Decision.

== Championships and accomplishments ==
=== Mixed martial arts ===
- Konfrontacja Sztuk Walki
  - Submission of the Night (One time) vs. Oskar Szczepaniak
- Babilon MMA
  - Babilon MMA Welterweight championship (One time; former)
    - Two successful title defenses
  - Knockout of the Night (One time) vs. Gianni Melillo
  - Fight of the Night (One time) vs. Davy Gallon

== Mixed martial arts record ==
Professional record breakdown
35 matches	23 wins	12 losses
By knockout	7	5
By submission	3	2
By decision	13	5

Res.	Record	Opponent	Method	Event	Date	Round	Time	Location	Notes
Loss	23–12	Mateusz Kisielewski	Decision (unanimous)	King's Arena 3	May 30, 2026	3	5:00	Białystok, Poland	
Loss	23–11	Dawid Kuczmarski	Decision (unanimous)	KSW 115	February 21, 2026	3	5:00	Lubin, Poland	
Win	23–10	Oskar Szczepaniak	Submission (rear-naked choke)	KSW 109	August 9, 2025	2	2:30	Warsaw, Poland	Submission of the Night.
Loss	22–10	Muslim Tulshaev	KO (punch)	KSW 102	January 25, 2025	2	1:40	Radom, Poland	
Win	22–9	Leonardo Damiani	Decision (split)	KSW 98	September 14, 2024	3	5:00	Lubin, Poland	Catchweight (176 lb) bout.
Win	21–9	Leonardo Damiani	Decision (split)	Hybrid MMA 3	March 1, 2024	3	5:00	Piła, Poland	Catchweight (176 lb) bout.
Win	20–9	Alisson Marreira	TKO (knee injury)	Hybrid MMA 2	December 15, 2023	1	1:04	Leszno, Poland	Catchweight (179 lb) bout.
Loss	19–9	Madars Fleminas	TKO (punches)	Cage Warriors 157	July 21, 2023	2	0:44	London, England	
Win	19–8	Omiel Brown	Decision (unanimous)	Cage Warriors 150	March 17, 2023	3	5:00	London, England	
Loss	18–8	Jim Wallhead	TKO (punch)	Cage Warriors 141	July 22, 2022	1	1:15	London, England	
Loss	18–7	Justin Burlinson	Submission (guillotine choke)	Cage Warriors 135	April 1, 2022	2	4:54	Manchester, England	
Loss	18–6	Tahir Abdullaev	TKO (punches)	UAE Warriors 24	October 29, 2021	1	0:45	Abu Dhabi, United Arab Emirates	
Win	18–5	Acoidan Duque	TKO (punches)	UAE Warriors 20	June 19, 2021	3	0:48	Abu Dhabi, United Arab Emirates	
Win	17–5	John Michael Sheil	TKO (punches)	EFM Show 1	April 9, 2021	1	2:10	Łódź, Poland	
Win	16–5	Kirill Medvedovski	TKO (body kick and punches)	Babilon MMA 15	August 28, 2020	1	3:02	Biała Rawska, Poland	Defended the Babilon MMA Welterweight championship.
Win	15–5	Lom-Ali Nalgiev	Decision (unanimous)	Babilon MMA 11	December 13, 2019	5	5:00	Radom, Poland	Defended the Babilon MMA Welterweight championship.
Win	14–5	Adriano Rodrigues	TKO (knees and punches)	Babilon MMA 8	May 31, 2019	2	2:26	Pruszków, Poland	Catchweight (174 lb) bout.
Win	13–5	Paweł Pawlak	Decision (unanimous)	Babilon MMA 6	December 15, 2018	5	5:00	Raszyn, Poland	Won the inaugural Babilon MMA Welterweight championship.
Win	12–5	Gianni Melillo	TKO (punches)	Babilon MMA 5	August 18, 2018	1	0:20	Międzyzdroje, Poland	Knockout of the Night.
Win	11–5	Davy Gallon	Decision (unanimous)	Babilon MMA 3	March 16, 2018	3	5:00	Radom, Poland	Fight of the Night.
Win	10–5	Islam Sayed	Submission (rear-naked choke)	VIP Fight Night at Five 1	November 13, 2017	1	3:58	Dubai, United Arab Emirates	
Win	9–5	Łukasz Szczerek	Submission (shoulder choke)	Babilon MMA 1	August 18, 2017	2	1:39	Międzyzdroje, Poland	
Win	8–5	Igor Michaliszyn	Decision (unanimous)	Victory FC League 4	April 28, 2017	3	5:00	Racibórz, Poland	
Win	7–5	Vitaly Slipenko	Decision (unanimous)	Spartan Fight 6	December 17, 2016	3	5:00	Płock, Poland	Return to Welterweight.
Loss	6–5	Nenad Avramović	Decision (unanimous)	IFO2 Europe	September 24, 2016	3	5:00	Frankfurt, Germany	Middleweight debut.
Loss	6–4	Ismail Naurdiev	KO (knee)	World Freefight Challenge 20	August 17, 2016	1	0:40	Bad Vöslau, Austria	
Win	6–3	Rafał Lewoń	Decision (unanimous)	Runda 5: Lewoń vs. Skibiński	December 5, 2015	3	5:00	Białogard, Poland	
Win	5–3	Maciej Kałuszewski	Decision (unanimous)	Arena Berserkerów 8	October 10, 2015	3	5:00	Szczecin, Poland	
Win	4–3	Ireneusz Ziółkowski	Decision (unanimous)	Arena Berserkerów 7	March 14, 2015	3	5:00	Szczecin, Poland	
Loss	3–3	Tomasz Romanowski	Decision (split)	XCage 6: PLMMA 38	September 5, 2014	3	5:00	Toruń, Poland	
Win	3–2	Kamil Krzemiński	TKO (punches)	Night of Champions 6	April 19, 2014	1	2:55	Poznań, Poland	
Loss	2–2	Kamil Szymuszowski	Decision (unanimous)	PLMMA 28	February 15, 2014	3	5:00	Bieżuń, Poland	
Win	2–1	Mariusz Radziszewski	Decision (unanimous)	PLMMA 24	November 15, 2013	3	5:00	Legionowo, Poland	
Win	1–1	Michał Michalski	Decision (split)	German MMA Championship 4	July 6, 2013	3	5:00	Herne, Germany	
Loss	0–1	Kamil Szymański	Submission (rear-naked choke)	SWG – Charity Fight Night	March 23, 2013	1	N/A	Gostyń, Poland	Welterweight debut.

== Exhibition boxing record ==
1 fight	0 wins	0 losses
By knockout	0	0
By decision	0	0
Draws	1	

No.	Result	Record	Opponent	Type	Round, time	Date	Location	Notes
1	Draw	0–0–1	Łukasz Szulc	UD	3	15 Oct 2022	Hala Widowiskowo-Sportowa OSiR, Mosina, Poland	

== See also ==
- List of current Konfrontacja Sztuk Walki fighters
- List of male mixed martial artists
