= Vigo Photonics =

Polish electronics company

- Logo
- Company type: joint stock company
- Industry: semiconductor manufacturing, photonics
- Founded: 1987; 39 years ago
- Headquarters: Ożarów Mazowiecki, Poland
- Area served: Poland, European Union
- Products: Infrared sensors photon detectors spectrophotometers semiconductors
- Owner: Adam Piotrowski
- Number of employees: 450-500 (2025)
- Website: vigophotonics.com

Vigo Photonics is a Polish electronics company that specializes in the creation of photonic integrated circuits and epitaxial wafers.

== History ==
The company was founded in 1987 and until its 35th anniversary in 2022 was named Vigo Systems.

== Products ==
In April 2025 Vigo saw an investment of zł1 Billion, 430 million of which came from EU funds to increase European semiconductor manufacturing. Vigo is a partner of the European Institute of Innovation and Technology. 65% of Vigo's products are sold within the European Union. This investment allowed them to increase their production line from 100 thousand to 1 million detectors per year and a staff of 200 to about 450–500. Their new dedicated facility will be the first semiconductor factory in Poland with production expected to begin in 2029. Vigo is a European industry leader in scientific research equipment created with unique proprietary technology.

From 2023 to 2025 the two largest areas of sales growth in Vigo was a 78% increase from military contracts and a 42% increase from semiconductor manufacturing. Some products that Vigo makes for the Polish Ministry of Defense include infrared detectors for smart ammunition, photon detectors to detect armored vehicles that also work for fire detection in smokey interiors, and other sensors that record temperature distributions on axles and brake calipers. Some of these defense technologies also have significant overlap with the civilian market, as trains also use Vigo sensors to record the temperature distribution on their axles, wheels, bearings and brake calipers. Vigo also produces purely civilian products, including blood glucose monitors and detectors for disease markers. As well as circuitry for carbon monoxide detectors.

Vigo has also become a contractor in Poland's burgeoning space industry, producing MIR infrared detectors for NASA's Curiosity Mars rover, the ESA's Schiaparelli, and to the Artemis Program's Orion.

== Research and development ==
Vigo has developed new techniques to create the first photonic integrated circuits that operate on the infrared spectrum under their HyperPIC program which the company estimates will increase their revenue by zł800 million. The company has also created the first ever liquid nitrogen cooled spectrophotometers.
