= Paweł Pawlak =

Polish mixed martial artist

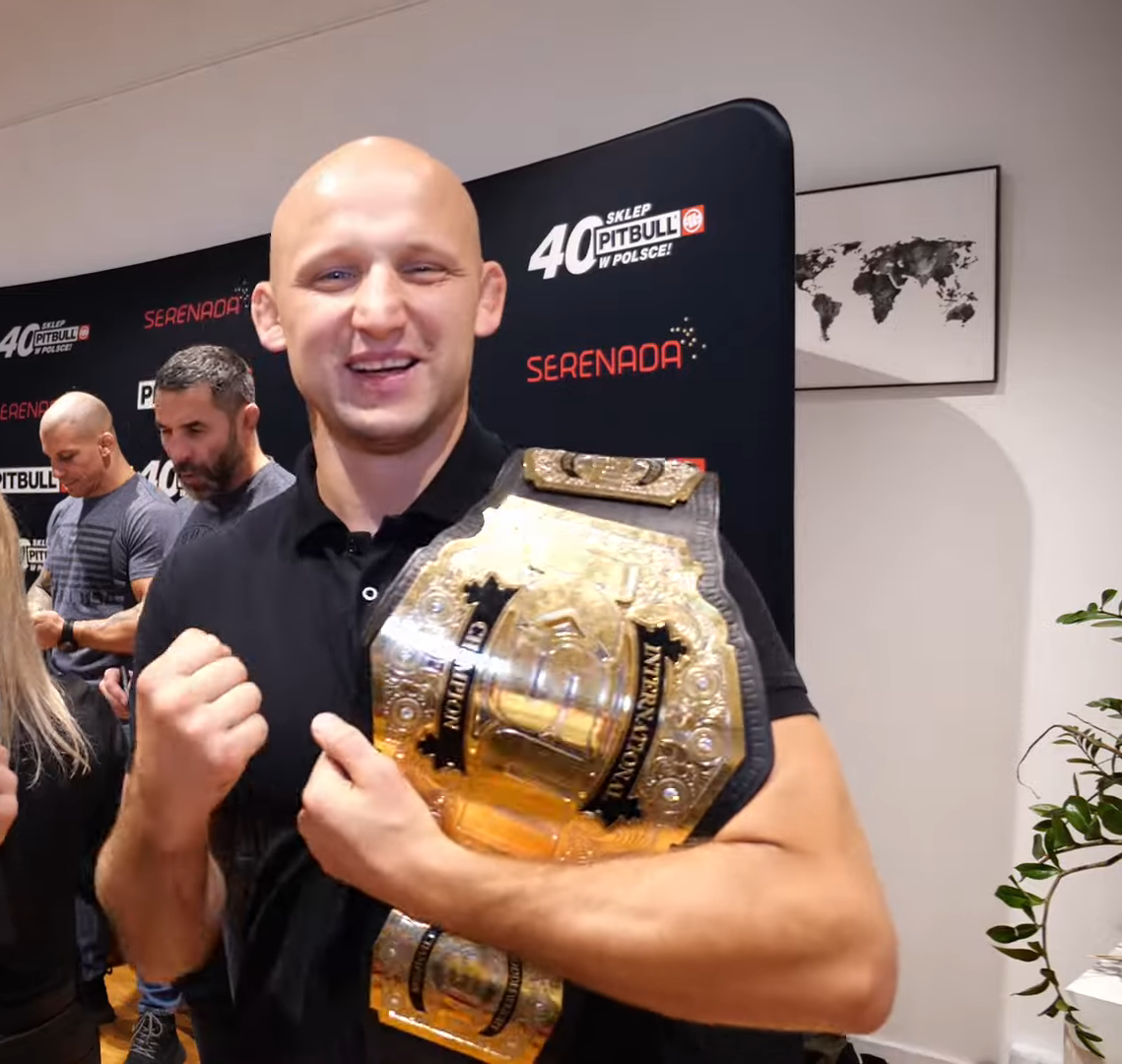
- Born: February 8, 1989 (age 37); Łódź, Poland
- Other names: Plastinho
- Nationality: Polish
- Height: 6 ft 0 in (1.83 m)
- Weight: 176.1 lb (79.9 kg; 12.58 st)
- Division: Middleweight (2020–present); Welterweight (2010–2020)
- Reach: 73.0 in (185 cm)
- Style: Kickboxing
- Fighting out of: Łódź, Poland
- Team: Gracie Barra Łódź (formerly); Octopus Łodź
- Years active: 2010–present

Mixed martial arts record
- Total: 31
- Wins: 26
- By knockout: 12
- By submission: 4
- By decision: 10
- Losses: 4
- By decision: 4
- Draws: 1

Other information
- Mixed martial arts record from Sherdog

Paweł Pawlak (born February 8, 1989) is a Polish mixed martial artist currently competing in the Middleweight division of Konfrontacja Sztuk Walki (KSW), where he is the current KSW Middleweight Champion. A professional since 2010, he has also fought in the UFC and the Absolute Championship Akhmat.

== Mixed martial arts career ==
=== Early career ===
Pawlak made his professional MMA debut in May 2010 in his native Poland. During the first three and a half years of his career, he amassed an undefeated record of ten wins, with all but one win coming by way of TKO or submission.

=== Ultimate Fighting Championship ===
Pawlak signed with the UFC in late 2013. He made his debut against Peter Sobotta at UFC Fight Night 41 on May 31, 2014. Pawlak lost the fight by unanimous decision.

Pawlak was scheduled to face Dhiego Lima at UFC Fight Night: Shogun vs. Saint Preux on November 8, 2014. However, Pawlak withdrew from the bout citing an injury, and was replaced by Jorge de Oliveira.

In his second fight for the promotion, Pawlak faced Sheldon Westcott at UFC Fight Night: Gonzaga vs. Cro Cop 2 on April 11, 2015. He won the fight via unanimous decision.

Pawlak then faced Leon Edwards at UFC Fight Night 72. He lost the fight via unanimous decision and was subsequently released from the promotion.

=== Post-UFC career ===
After the UFC stint, Pawlak has mainly competed in his native Poland and eventually fought for the vacant Babilon MMA Middleweight Championship against Adrian Błeszyński at Babilon 12 on February 7, 2020. The bout ended in a split draw.

After knocking out Filip Tomczak at Babilon 14, Pawlak proceeded to fight again for the vacant Middleweight Championship in a rematch against Adrian Błeszyński at Babilon 18 on November 27, 2020. He won the fight and claimed the title via unanimous decision.

Pawlak made his first title defense against Sergey Guzev at Babilon 21 on April 30, 2021. He successfully defended the championship via unanimous decision.

=== KSW ===
Pawlak faced Greco-Roman Olympic bronze medalist wrestler Damian Janikowski on September 4, 2021 at KSW 63: Crime of The Century. He won the bout via unanimous decision. Both fighters earned Fight of the Night award.

Pawlak faced Cezary Kęsik at KSW 69: Przybysz vs. Martins on April 23, 2022. He won the bout via split decision.

Pawlak was then scheduled to face Bartosz Leśko at KSW 76: Parnasse vs. Rajewski on November 12, 2022. However, Leśko withdrew from the bout citing an injury, and was replaced by Tom Breese. Pawlak won the bout via ground and pound TKO in the first round.

==== KSW Middleweight Championship ====
Pawlak faced Tomasz Romanowski for the vacant KSW Middleweight Championship at KSW 83 on June 3, 2023. He won the bout and title via technical knockout in the fifth round.

Pawlak defended his title against Michał Materla on December 16, 2023 at KSW 89: Bartosiński vs. Parnasse, winning the bout via unanimous decision.

On July 20, 2024, in the main event of KSW 96: Pawlak vs. Janikowski 2, he made his second defense of the championship belt, fighting a rematch with Damian Janikowski. He again defeated his rival unanimously on the scorecards, thus defending the title.

== Championships and accomplishments ==
- Konfrontacja Sztuk Walki
  - KSW Middleweight Championship (One time; current)
    - One successful title defence
  - Fight of the Night (one time) vs. Damian Janikowski
- Babilon MMA
  - Babilon MMA Middleweight championship (One time; former)
    - One successful title defense

== Mixed martial arts record ==
Professional record breakdown
31 matches	26 wins	4 losses
By knockout	12	0
By submission	4	0
By decision	10	4
Draws	1	

Res.	Record	Opponent	Method	Event	Date	Round	Time	Location	Notes
Win	26–4–1	Mamed Khalidov	TKO (elbows)	KSW 117	April 18, 2026	4	4:59	Warsaw, Poland	Defended the KSW Middleweight Championship.
Win	25–4–1	Laïd Zerhouni	Submission (kneebar)	KSW 113	December 20, 2025	5	3:09	Łódź, Poland	Defended the KSW Middleweight Championship. Submission of the Night.
Win	24–4–1	Damian Janikowski	Decision (unanimous)	KSW 96	July 20, 2024	5	5:00	Łódź, Poland	Defended the KSW Middleweight Championship.
Win	23–4–1	Michał Materla	Decision (unanimous)	KSW 89	December 16, 2023	5	5:00	Gliwice, Poland	Defended the KSW Middleweight Championship.
Win	22–4–1	Tomasz Romanowski	TKO (elbows)	KSW 83	June 3, 2023	5	3:25	Warsaw, Poland	Won the vacant KSW Middleweight Championship.
Win	21–4–1	Tom Breese	TKO (elbow and punches)	KSW 76	November 12, 2022	1	3:54	Grodzisk Mazowiecki, Poland	
Win	20–4–1	Cezary Kęsik	Decision (split)	KSW 69	April 23, 2022	3	5:00	Warsaw, Poland	
Win	19–4–1	Damian Janikowski	Decision (unanimous)	KSW 63	September 4, 2021	3	5:00	Warsaw, Poland	Fight of the Night.
Win	18–4–1	Sergey Guzev	Decision (unanimous)	Babilon MMA 21	April 30, 2021	5	5:00	Warsaw, Poland	Defended the Babilon MMA Middleweight Championship.
Win	17–4–1	Adrian Błeszyński	Decision (unanimous)	Babilon MMA 18	November 27, 2020	5	5:00	Warsaw, Poland	Won the vacant Babilon MMA Middleweight Championship.
Win	16–4–1	Filip Tomczak	TKO (punches)	Babilon MMA 14	June 26, 2020	3	1:18	Radom, Poland	
Draw	15–4–1	Adrian Błeszyński	Draw (split)	Babilon MMA 12	February 7, 2020	5	5:00	Łomża, Poland	Middleweight debut. For the vacant Babilon MMA Middleweight Championship.
Win	15–4	Evgeny Bondar	Decision (split)	ACA 96	June 8, 2019	3	5:00	Łódź, Poland	Catchweight (176.1 lb) bout; both fighters missed weight.
Loss	14–4	Daniel Skibiński	Decision (unanimous)	Babilon MMA 6	December 15, 2018	5	5:00	Raszyn, Poland	For the inaugural Babilon MMA Welterweight championship.
Win	14–3	Rafał Lewoń	TKO (elbows)	Babilon MMA 5	August 18, 2018	3	1:26	Międzyzdroje, Poland	Fight of the Night.
Win	13–3	Adam Niedźwiedź	TKO (elbows)	Babilon MMA 2	July 18, 2017	2	4:37	Legionowo, Poland	Catchweight bout (176 lb).
Win	12–3	Ireneusz Szydiowski	Decision (unanimous)	Fight Exclusive Night 16	March 11, 2017	3	5:00	Warsaw, Poland	
Loss	11–3	Igor Fernandes	Decision (unanimous)	Fight Exclusive Night 12	May 20, 2016	3	5:00	Warsaw, Poland	
Loss	11–2	Leon Edwards	Decision (unanimous)	UFC Fight Night: Bisping vs. Leites	July 18, 2015	3	5:00	Glasgow, Scotland	
Win	11–1	Sheldon Westcott	Decision (unanimous)	UFC Fight Night: Gonzaga vs. Cro Cop 2	April 11, 2015	3	5:00	Kraków, Poland	
Loss	10–1	Peter Sobotta	Decision (unanimous)	UFC Fight Night: Muñoz vs. Mousasi	May 31, 2014	3	5:00	Berlin, Germany	
Win	10–0	Mateusz Strzelczyk	TKO (elbows)	MMA Fighters Club 1	November 9, 2013	3	3:00	Inowrocław, Poland	
Win	9–0	Laszlo Soltesz	TKO (corner stoppage)	Miedzychod Town Council 4	October 12, 2013	1	5:00	Międzychód, Poland	Catchweight (179 lb) bout.
Win	8–0	Szymon Nadobny	Submission (inverted triangle choke)	ArMMAgedon 1	September 7, 2013	1	4:03	Stargard Szczecinski, Poland	Catchweight (176 lb) bout.
Win	7–0	Artur Piotrowski	TKO (punches)	PLMMA 17 Extra	May 18, 2013	2	2:24	Olsztyn, Poland	
Win	6–0	Pawel Latalo	TKO (elbows)	Fighters Arena 5	January 26, 2013	1	2:15	Krasnik, Poland	Catchweight (174.2 lb) bout; Pawlak missed weight.
Win	5–0	Shamil Ilyasov	TKO (elbows)	Fighters Arena 3	September 29, 2012	2	1:32	Łódź, Poland	
Win	4–0	Adam Golonkiewicz	Submission (inverted triangle choke)	XCage: Extreme Cage 4	May 19, 2012	2	2:35	Toruń, Poland	
Win	3–0	Matas Stebuliauskas	TKO (punches)	Fighters Arena Łódź 2	March 26, 2011	2	3:48	Łódź, Poland	
Win	2–0	Laszlo Acs	Decision (unanimous)	Fighters Arena Łódź 1	September 3, 2010	2	5:00	Łódź, Poland	
Win	1–0	Tomasz Krauze	TKO (submission to punches)	Strefa Walk: Krysztofiak vs. Bandel	May 28, 2010	1	1:19	Poznań, Poland	Welterweight debut.

== See also ==
- List of current KSW fighters
- List of male mixed martial artists
