= Dawid Kuczmarski =

Polish mixed martial artist (born 2002)

- Born: Dawid Kuczmarski; 18 September 2002 (age 24); Olsztyn, Poland
- Other names: Kuczmar
- Height: 5 ft 11 in (1.80 m)
- Weight: 170 lb (77 kg; 12 st 2 lb)
- Division: Lightweight (2020, 2022); Welterweight (2023–present)
- Reach: 72 in (183 cm)
- Fighting out of: Wrocław, Poland
- Team: Arrachion Olsztyn (former); Klub Samuraj Wrocław
- Years active: 2020–present

Mixed martial arts record
- Total: 9
- Wins: 9
- By knockout: 0
- By submission: 1
- By decision: 8
- By disqualification: 0
- Losses: 0
- By knockout: 0
- By submission: 0
- By decision: 0
- No contests: 0

Other information
- Mixed martial arts record from Sherdog

Dawid Kuczmarski (born 18 September 2002) is a Polish professional mixed martial artist. He currently competes in the Welterweight division of Konfrontacja Sztuk Walki (KSW). He has previously competed on Babilon MMA.

== Professional career ==
=== Early career ===
Kuczmarski made his professional debut on September 26, 2020, against Jakub Nowakowski. Kuczmarski won the fight via a Unanimous Decision.

After a near two-year hiatus, he returned on June 10, 2022, against Marcin Zając. Kuczmarski won the fight via a Split Decision.

=== Babilon MMA ===
Kuczmarski made his debut under Babilon MMA on June 10, 2023, against Arkadiusz Kolus. Kuczmarski won the fight via a Unanimous Decision.

His next fight came on October 7, 2023, against Karol Bromblik. Kuczmarski won the fight via a Unanimous Decision.

His final fight with the federation came on January 27, 2024, against Wojciech Demczur. Kuczmarski won the fight via a Unanimous Decision.

=== Konfrontacja Sztuk Walki ===
Kuczmarski made his debut under Konfrontacja Sztuk Walki (KSW) on June 7, 2024, against Morgann Gbolou, with the fight being his first professional fight in his hometown of Olsztyn. Kuczmarski won the fight via a first-round submission. This performance earned him his first career Submission of the Night bonus.

After a year-long hiatus, he returned on July 19, 2025, against Michał Guzik. Kuczmarski won the fight via a Split Decision.

His next fight came on November 15, 2025, against Krystian Kaszubowski. Kuczmarski won the fight via a Unanimous Decision.

His next fight came on February 21, 2026, against Daniel Skibiński. Kuczmarski won the fight via a Unanimous Decision.

== Championships and accomplishments ==
=== Mixed martial arts ===
- Konfrontacja Sztuk Walki
  - Submission of the Night (One time)

== Mixed martial arts record ==
Professional record breakdown
9 matches	9 wins	0 losses
By submission	1	0
By decision	8	0

Res.	Record	Opponent	Method	Event	Date	Round	Time	Location	Notes
Win	9–0	Daniel Skibiński	Decision (unanimous)	KSW 115	February 21, 2026	3	5:00	Lubin, Poland	
Win	8–0	Krystian Kaszubowski	Decision (unanimous)	KSW 112	November 15, 2025	3	5:00	Szczecin, Poland	
Win	7–0	Michał Guzik	Decision (split)	KSW 108	July 19, 2025	3	5:00	Olsztyn, Poland	
Win	6–0	Morgan Gbolou	Submission (guillotine choke)	KSW 95	June 7, 2024	1	1:11	Olsztyn, Poland	Submission of the Night.
Win	5–0	Wojciech Demczur	Decision (unanimous)	Babilon MMA 42	January 27, 2024	3	5:00	Żyrardów, Poland	
Win	4–0	Karol Bromblik	Decision (unanimous)	Babilon MMA 40	October 7, 2023	3	5:00	Wieliczka, Poland	
Win	3–0	Arkadiusz Kolus	Decision (unanimous)	Babilon MMA 36	June 10, 2023	3	5:00	Ostrołęka, Poland	Welterweight debut.
Win	2–0	Marcin Zając	Decision (split)	CAVEMMA 1	June 10, 2022	3	5:00	Jaworzno, Poland	
Win	1–0	Jakub Nowakowski	Decision (unanimous)	Time of Masters 6	September 26, 2020	3	5:00	Lidzbark, Poland	Lightweight debut.

== See also ==
- List of male mixed martial artists
- List of current Konfrontacja Sztuk Walki fighters
