= Bellator 280 =

Bellator mixed martial arts event in 2022

Bellator 280: Bader vs. Kongo 2
- The poster for Bellator 280: Bader vs. Kongo 2
- Promotion: Bellator MMA
- Date: May 6, 2022
- Venue: AccorHotels Arena
- City: Paris, France

Event chronology
Bellator 279: Cyborg vs. Blencowe 2	Bellator 280: Bader vs. Kongo 2	Bellator 281: MVP vs. Storley

Bellator 280: Bader vs. Kongo 2 was a mixed martial arts event produced by Bellator MMA that took place on May 6, 2022, at AccorHotels Arena in Paris, France.

== Background ==
The event marked the promotion's second visit to Paris and first since Bellator 248 in October 2020.

A Bellator Heavyweight World Championship rematch between current champion (also former Bellator Light Heavyweight World Champion and The Ultimate Fighter: Team Nogueira vs. Team Mir light heavyweight winner) Ryan Bader and Cheick Kongo headlined the event. The pairing previously met at Bellator 226 in 2019, which the bout ended due to an accidental poke to Kongo's left eye in the opening round, resulting in a no contest.

A featherweight bout between Pedro Carvalho and Khasan Askhabov was scheduled for this event. However, due to undisclosed reasons, Askhabov was forced to pull out and was replaced by promotional newcomer Piotr Niedzielski.

A bout between Melvin Manhoef and Yoel Romero was scheduled to be the co-main event. However, Manhoef withdrew from the bout due to a hand injury while stopping burglars and was replaced by Alex Polizzi.

A middleweight bout between Lorenz Larkin and Khalid Murtazaliev was scheduled for this event. However at the end of March, Murtazaliev pulled out of the bout and was replaced by Anthony Adams. Adams in turn pulled out as well and was replaced by UFC vet Kyle Stewart.

A heavyweight bout between Davion Franklin and Daniel James was planned for the event. However, James failed an out of competition drug test and was pulled from the bout.

A lightweight bout between Søren Bak and Saul Rogers was scheduled for this event. Due to Rogers pulling out of the bout on two weeks notice, Bak was rescheduled against Charlie Leary in a 160 pound catchweight bout.

A welterweight bout between Nicolò Solli and Joël Kouadja was scheduled for the event. However, the French Athletics Federation scrapped the initial bout and Kouadja's replacement, Levy Carriel, tested positive for COVID-19 five days before the event.

== Results ==
Main Card (Showtime)
Weight class				Method	Round	Time	Notes
Heavyweight	Ryan Bader (c)	def.	Cheick Kongo	Decision (unanimous) (50–45, 50–45, 50–45)	5	5:00	(Note: For the Bellator Heavyweight World Championship.)
Light Heavyweight	Yoel Romero	def.	Alex Polizzi	TKO (punches)	3	4:59
Lightweight	Davy Gallon	def.	Benjamin Brander	TKO (punches and elbows)	2	3:18
Middleweight	Lorenz Larkin	def.	Kyle Stewart	TKO (knees and punches)	1	4:44
Middleweight	Gregory Babene	def.	Mike Shipman	KO (punches)	1	2:11
Preliminary card (Youtube/Pluto TV)
Featherweight	Piotr Niedzielski	def.	Pedro Carvalho	Decision (split) (28–29, 29–28, 29–28)	3	5:00
Welterweight	Thibault Gouti	def.	Lewis Long	Decision (unanimous) (30–27, 30–27, 30–27)	3	5:00
Featherweight	Jordan Barton	def.	Fabacary Diatta	Decision (split) (28–29, 29–28, 29–28)	3	5:00
Catchweight (160 lb)	Søren Bak	def.	Charlie Leary	Decision (unanimous) (29–28, 30–27, 29–28)	3	5:00
Lightweight	Yves Landu	def.	Gavin Hughes	TKO (knees and body kick)	1	3:01
Women's Flyweight	Lucie Bertaud	def.	Katarzyna Sadura	Decision (unanimous) (29–28, 30–27, 30–27)	3	5:00
Middleweight	Youcef Ouabbas	def.	Matthieu Letho Duclos	TKO (punches)	1	4:17
Welterweight	Bourama Camara	def.	Victor Verchere	KO (punches)	1	3:06

== See also ==
- 2022 in Bellator MMA
- List of Bellator MMA events
- List of current Bellator fighters
