= 2025 in Konfrontacja Sztuk Walki =

Mixed martial arts events

Information
- First date: January 25, 2025
- Last date: December 20, 2025

Events
- Total events: 12

Fights
- Total fights: 111
- Title fights: 12

Chronology
2024 in KSW	2025 in Konfrontacja Sztuk Walki	2026 in KSW

The year 2025 was the 21st year in the history of the Konfrontacja Sztuk Walki, a mixed martial arts promotion based in Poland. 2025 began with KSW 102.

== List of events ==
#	Event Title	Date	Arena	Location
1	XTB KSW 102: Przybysz vs. Azevedo	January 25, 2025	Radom Sports Center	Radom, Poland
2	XTB KSW 103: Brichta vs. Charzewski	February 21, 2025	Home Credit Arena	Liberec, Czech Republic
3	XTB KSW 104: Kuberski vs. Romanowski	March 8, 2025	Arena Gorzów	Gorzów Wielkopolski, Poland
4	XTB KSW 105: Bartosiński vs. Grzebyk 2	April 26, 2025	Gliwice Arena	Gliwice, Poland
5	XTB KSW 106: Parnasse vs. Ziółkowski	May 10, 2025	LDLC Arena	Lyon, France
6	XTB KSW 107: De Fries vs. Wrzosek	June 14, 2025	Ergo Arena	Gdańsk, Poland
7	XTB KSW 108: Soldaev vs. Brichta	July 19, 2025	Hala Urania	Olsztyn, Poland
8	XTB KSW 109: Kuberski vs. Paczuski	August 9, 2025	ATM Studio	Warsaw, Poland
9	XTB KSW 110: Grzebyk vs. Tulshaev	September 20, 2025	Hala Podpromie	Rzeszów, Poland
10	XTB KSW 111: De Fries vs. Vojčák	October 18, 2025	Werk Arena	Třinec, Czech Republic
11	XTB KSW 112: Kaczmarczyk vs. Soldaev	November 15, 2025	Enea Arena	Szczecin, Poland
12	XTB KSW 113: Bartosiński vs. Tulshaev	December 20, 2025	Atlas Arena	Łódź, Poland

== XTB KSW 102: Przybysz vs. Azevedo ==
XTB KSW 102: Przybysz vs. Azevedo
- Promotion: Konfrontacja Sztuk Walki
- Date: January 25, 2025
- Venue: Radom Sports Center
- City: (Poland) Radom

XTB KSW 102: Przybysz vs. Azevedo was a mixed martial arts event held by Konfrontacja Sztuk Walki on January 25, 2025, at the Radom Sports Center in Radom, Poland.

=== Background ===
On December 16, 2024, the KSW organization announced the termination of cooperation with champion Jakub Wikłacz and the termination of the contract with him by mutual consent of the parties. After the current champion Wikłacz left KSW, Przybysz fought once again for the bantamweight championship belt on January 25, 2025, during XTB KSW 102 in Radom. His opponent was Brazilian Bruno Azevedo, ranked 2nd in the ranking.

Bonus awards

The following fighters were awarded bonuses:

- Fight of the Night: Andi Vrtačić vs. Cezary Kęsik
- Submission of the Night: Piotr Kacprzak
- Knockout of the Night: Muslim Tulshaev

=== Results ===
Main card (Canal+ / KSWTV)
Weight class				Method	Round	Time	Notes
Bantamweight	Sebastian Przybysz	def.	Bruno Azevedo	Decision (unanimous) (48–47, 48–46, 49–45)	5	5:00	(Note: For the vacant KSW Bantamweight Championship.)
Featherweight	Patryk Kaczmarczyk	def.	Ahmed Vila	Decision (unanimous) (30–27, 30–27, 30–27)	3	5:00
Middleweight	Radosław Paczuski	def.	Kleber Silva	Decision (unanimous) (30–27, 30–27, 30–27)	3	5:00
Featherweight	Adam Soldaev	def.	Daniel Tărchilă	Decision (unanimous) (29–28, 29–28, 29–28)	3	5:00
Welterweight	Muslim Tulshaev	def.	Daniel Skibiński	KO (punches)	2	1:41
Women's Flyweight	Wiktoria Czyżewska	def.	Adrianna Kreft	Decision (unanimous) (30–27, 30–27, 30–27)	3	5:00
Catchweight (192 lb)	Andi Vrtačić	def.	Cezariusz Kęsik	TKO (spinning backfist and elbows)	2	4:33
Preliminary card (YouTube)
Featherweight	Piotr Kacprzak	def.	Julio Cesar Neves Jr.	Submission (triangle choke)	3	2:19
Heavyweight	Miha Frlić	def.	Kamil Gawryjołek	TKO (punches)	1	2:12

== XTB KSW 103: Brichta vs. Charzewski ==
XTB KSW 103: Brichta vs. Charzewski
- Promotion: Konfrontacja Sztuk Walki
- Date: February 21, 2025
- Venue: Home Credit Arena
- City: (Czech Republic) Liberec

XTB KSW 103: Brichta vs. Charzewski was a mixed martial arts event held by Konfrontacja Sztuk Walki on February 21, 2025, at the Home Credit Arena in Liberec, Czech Republic.

=== Background ===
On February 21, 2025, the KSW brand will return to the Czech Republic. The XTB KSW 103 will take place in Liberec, where the KSW organization has already appeared twice. Famous Czech names are scheduled to appear in the main fights of the evening: Leo Brichta, Dominik Humburger and Josef Štummer. Brichta, who has previously fought in the lightweight category, is to make his debut in the featherweight category during the XTB KSW 103. The event will take place at the Home Credit Arena.

Bonus awards

The following fighters were awarded bonuses:

- Fight of the Night: Dominik Humburger vs. Borys Dzikowski
- Submission of the Night: Oleksii Polischuck
- Knockout of the Night: Josef Štummer

=== Results ===
Main card (Canal+ / KSWTV)
Weight class				Method	Round	Time	Notes
Featherweight	Leo Brichta	def.	Łukasz Charzewski	TKO (knee and punches)	1	2:33
Light Heavyweight	Damian Piwowarczyk	def.	Bartosz Szewczyk	KO (punches)	1	3:19
Middleweight	Dominik Humburger	def.	Borys Dzikowski	Decision (unanimous) (29–28, 29–28, 30–27)	3	5:00
Welterweight	Krystian Kaszubowski	def.	Matúš Juráček	Decision (unanimous) (29–28, 29–28, 29–28)	3	5:00
Bantamweight	Oleksii Polishchuk	def.	Alfan Rocher-Labes	Submission (triangle armbar)	2	3:10
Catchweight (174 lb)	Henry Fadipe	def.	Steven Krt	Decision (unanimous) (29–28, 29–28, 29–28)	3	5:00
Catchweight (159 lb)	Welisson Paiva	def.	Dawid Śmiełowski	Decision (unanimous) (29–28, 29–28, 30–27)	3	5:00
Preliminary card (YouTube)
Catchweight (174 lb)	Jacek Gać	def.	Samuel Bily	TKO (punches)	1	3:07
Featherweight	Josef Štummer	def.	Nacim Belhouachi	KO (punch)	1	2:20

== XTB KSW 104: Kuberski vs. Romanowski ==
XTB KSW 104
- Promotion: Konfrontacja Sztuk Walki
- Date: March 8, 2025
- Venue: Arena Gorzów
- City: (Poland) Gorzów Wielkopolski

XTB KSW 104: Kuberski vs. Romanowski was a mixed martial arts event held by Konfrontacja Sztuk Walki on March 8, 2025, at the Arena Gorzów in Gorzów Wielkopolski. Poland.

=== Background ===
During the KSW event in 2025, the organization will come to Gorzów Wielkopolski for the second time in history. In the evening fight, which will follow the fight for the interim championship belt, a fight between rivals famous for their strong, uncompromising battles. Piotr Kuberski (15–1, 13 KO), number two in the ranking, will face Tomasz Romanowski (18–10 1NC, 7 KO, 1 Sub), number four. The XTB KSW 104 will take place on March 8 at the Arena Gorzów.

Bonus awards

The following fighters were awarded bonuses:

- Fight of the Night: Piotr Kuberski vs. Tomasz Romanowski
- Submission of the Night: Ewelina Woźniak
- Knockout of the Night: Sergiusz Zając

=== Results ===
Main card (Canal+ / KSWTV)
Weight class				Method	Round	Time	Notes
Middleweight	Piotr Kuberski	def.	Tomasz Romanowski	TKO (punches)	3	4:19	(Note: For the interim KSW Middleweight Championship.)
Welterweight	Tymoteusz Łopaczyk	def.	Oskar Szczepaniak	TKO (punches)	1	4:38
Women's Strawweight	Ewelina Woźniak	def.	Sofiia Bagishvili	Technical Submission (rear-naked choke)	1	1:32
Light Heavyweight	Bartosz Leśko	def.	Maciej Różański	Decision (unanimous) (29–28, 29–28, 29–28)	3	5:00
Light Heavyweight	Krzysztof Głowacki	vs.	Jordan Nandor	No Contest (accidental eye poke)	1	0:20	(Note: Accidental eye poke rendered Głowacki unable to continue.)
Light Heavyweight	Sergiusz Zając	def.	Michał Dreczkowski	KO (knee)	1	4:00
Lightweight	Szymon Karolczyk	def.	Bartłomiej Kopera	Decision (split) (29–28, 28–29, 29–28)	3	5:00
Preliminary card (YouTube)
Middleweight	Bartosz Kurek	def.	Damian Mieczkowski	TKO (punches)	1	1:21
Heavyweight	Marek Samociuk	def.	Filip Stawowy	Decision (unanimous) (30–27, 30–27, 29–28)	3	5:00

== XTB KSW 105: Bartosiński vs. Grzebyk 2 ==
XTB KSW 105: Bartosiński vs. Grzebyk 2
- Promotion: Konfrontacja Sztuk Walki
- Date: April 26, 2025
- Venue: Gliwice Arena
- City: (Poland) Gliwice

XTB KSW 105: Bartosiński vs. Grzebyk 2 was a mixed martial arts event held by Konfrontacja Sztuk Walki on April 26, 2025, at the Gliwice Arena in Gliwice. Poland.

=== Background ===
Bonus awards

The following fighters were awarded bonuses:

- Fight of the Night: Adrian Bartosiński vs. Andrzej Grzebyk
- Submission of the Night: Adam Niedźwiedź
- Knockout of the Night: Artur Szczepaniak

=== Results ===
Main card (Canal+ / KSWTV)
Weight class				Method	Round	Time	Notes
Welterweight	Adrian Bartosiński (c)	def.	Andrzej Grzebyk	Decision (unanimous) (50–45, 49–46, 48–47)	5	5:00	(Note: For the KSW Welterweight Championship.)
Heavyweight	Artur Szpilka	def.	Errol Zimmerman	Submission (arm-triangle choke)	1	1:49
Welterweight	Artur Szczepaniak	def.	Igor Michaliszyn	TKO (head kick and punches)	1	2:40
Super Heavyweight	Eddie Hall	def.	Mariusz Pudzianowski	TKO (punches)	1	0:30	(Note: Exhibition bout.)
Welterweight	Kacper Koziorzębski	def.	Madars Fleminas	Decision (split) (29–28, 28–29, 29–28)	3	5:00
Heavyweight	Augusto Sakai	def.	Szymon Bajor	Decision (split) (29–28, 28–29, 29–28)	3	5:00
Women's Flyweight	Laura Grzyb	def.	Gabriela Hristea	Decision (unanimous) (30–27, 30–27, 30–27)	3	5:00
Preliminary card (YouTube)
Welterweight	Adam Niedźwiedź	def.	Marcin Krakowiak	Submission (omoplata)	1	2:53
Heavyweight	Denis Górniak	def.	Michał Turyński	TKO (punches)	1	4:28

== XTB KSW 106: Parnasse vs. Ziółkowski ==
XTB KSW 106: Parnasse vs. Ziółkowski
- Promotion: Konfrontacja Sztuk Walki
- Date: May 10, 2025
- Venue: LDLC Arena
- City: (France) Lyon

XTB KSW 106: Parnasse vs. Ziółkowski was a mixed martial arts event held by Konfrontacja Sztuk Walki on May 10, 2025, at the LDLC Arena in Lyon, France.

=== Background ===
Bonus awards

The following fighters were awarded bonuses:

- Fight of the Night: Amin Ayoub vs. Mickaël Lebout and Souheil Kaouchen vs. Oskar Stachura
- Knockout of the Night: Laïd Zerhouni

=== Results ===
Main card (Canal+ / KSWTV)
Weight class				Method	Round	Time	Notes
Lightweight	Salahdine Parnasse (c)	def.	Marian Ziółkowski	TKO (punches)	2	3:54	(Note: For the KSW Lightweight Championship.)
Middleweight	Laïd Zerhouni	def.	Damian Janikowski	KO (punches)	1	1:54
Catchweight (159 lb)	Amin Ayoub	def.	Mickaël Lebout	Decision (unanimous) (29–28, 29–28, 29–28)	3	5:00
Lightweight	Mateusz Makarowski	def.	Aymard Guih	Decision (unanimous) (29–28, 29–28, 29–28)	3	5:00
Featherweight	Alioune Nahaye	def.	Piotr Kacprzak	TKO (knee to the body and punches)	3	0:30	(Note: Kacprzak missed weight (148 lb).)
Welterweight	Joël Kouadja	def.	Michał Guzik	Decision (unanimous) (29–28, 29–28, 29–28)	3	5:00
Lightweight	Amaury Wako-Zabo	def.	Kacper Fornalski	TKO (punches)	3	3:16
Preliminary card (YouTube)
Lightweight	Hugo Deux	def.	Krystian Blezień	Decision (unanimous) (30–27, 30–27, 30–27)	3	5:00
Featherweight	Souheil Kaouchen	def.	Oskar Stachura	Decision (unanimous) (29–27, 29–27, 29–28)	3	5:00

== XTB KSW 107: De Fries vs. Wrzosek ==
XTB KSW 107: De Fries vs. Wrzosek
- Promotion: Konfrontacja Sztuk Walki
- Date: June 14, 2025
- Venue: Ergo Arena
- City: (Poland) Gdańsk

XTB KSW 107: De Fries vs. Wrzosek was a mixed martial arts event held by Konfrontacja Sztuk Walki on June 14, 2025, at the Ergo Arena in Gdańsk, Poland.

=== Background ===
Bonus awards

The following fighters were awarded bonuses:

- Fight of the Night: Sebastian Przybysz vs. Marcelo Morelli
- Submission of the Night: Damian Piwowarczyk
- Knockout of the Night: Roman Szymański

=== Results ===
Main card (Canal+ / KSWTV)
Weight class				Method	Round	Time	Notes
Heavyweight	Phil De Fries (c)	def.	Arkadiusz Wrzosek	Submission (keylock)	1	3:33	(Note: For the KSW Heavyweight Championship.)
Bantamweight	Sebastian Przybysz (c)	def.	Marcelo Morelli	Submission (rear-naked choke)	3	4:30	(Note: For the KSW Bantamweight Championship.)
Lightweight	Roman Szymański	def.	Kacper Formela	KO (punches)	1	4:15
Light Heavyweight	Damian Piwowarczyk	def.	Cedric Lushima	Submission (guillotine choke)	1	2:05
Welterweight	Wiktor Zalewski	def.	Mateusz Pawlik	TKO (elbows and punches)	3	2:14
Featherweight	Damian Stasiak	def.	Michał Domin	Decision (unanimous) (30–27, 30–27, 29–28)	3	5:00
Featherweight	Oleksii Polishchuk	def.	Islam Djabrailov	Submission (triangle choke)	1	2:23
Preliminary card (YouTube)
Bantamweight	Kamil Szkaradek	def.	Kenji Bortoluzzi	Decision (unanimous) (29–28, 29–28, 29–28)	3	5:00
Lightweight	Wojciech Kawa	def.	El Hadji Ndiaye	Decision (unanimous) (30–27, 30–27, 30–27)	3	5:00

== XTB KSW 108: Soldaev vs. Brichta ==
XTB KSW 108: Soldaev vs. Brichta
- Promotion: Konfrontacja Sztuk Walki
- Date: July 19, 2025
- Venue: Hala Urania
- City: (Poland) Olsztyn

XTB KSW 108 was a mixed martial arts event held by Konfrontacja Sztuk Walki on July 19, 2025, at the Hala Urania in Olsztyn, Poland.

=== Background ===
Bonus awards

The following fighters were awarded bonuses:

- Fight of the Night: Wiktoria Czyżewska vs. Bianca Sattelmayer
- Submission of the Night: Igor Włodarczyk
- Knockout of the Night: Adam Soldaev

=== Results ===
Main card (Canal+ / KSWTV)
Weight class				Method	Round	Time	Notes
Featherweight	Adam Soldaev	def.	Leo Brichta	KO (punch)	1	3:02	(Note: Soldaev missed weight (149 lb).)
Light Heavyweight	Marcin Wójcik	def.	Ibragim Chuzhigaev	TKO (punches)	2	4:20
Women's Flyweight	Wiktoria Czyżewska	def.	Bianca Sattelmayer	Decision (unanimous) (29–28, 29–28, 29–27)	3	5:00
Welterweight	Adam Niedźwiedź	vs.	Adrian Zieliński	No Contest (overturned)	1	2:30	(Note: Originally a KO (elbows) win for Zieliński; overturned after review that an illegal elbows to the back of the head.)
Heavyweight	Michal Martínek	def.	Matheus Scheffel	TKO (arm injury)	1	5:00
Welterweight	Dawid Kuczmarski	def.	Michał Guzik	Decision (split) (29–28, 28–29, 29–28)	3	5:00
Featherweight	Wojciech Kazieczko	def.	Dawid Kareta	Decision (unanimous) (29–28, 29–28, 29–28)	3	5:00
Preliminary card (YouTube)
Lightweight	Igor Włodarczyk	def.	Dominik Gabner	Submission (rear-naked choke)	1	2:22
Lightweight	Karol Durszlewicz	def.	Grzegorz Stabach	KO (punch to the body)	3	0:39

== XTB KSW 109: Kuberski vs. Paczuski ==
XTB KSW 109: Kuberski vs. Paczuski
- Promotion: Konfrontacja Sztuk Walki
- Date: August 9, 2025
- Venue: ATM Studio
- City: (Poland) Warsaw

XTB KSW 109: Kuberski vs. Paczuski is a mixed martial arts event to be held by Konfrontacja Sztuk Walki on August 9, 2025, at the ATM Studio in Warsaw, Poland.

=== Background ===
Bonus awards

The following fighters were awarded bonuses:

- Fight of the Night: Michał Michalski vs. Andi Vrtačić
- Submission of the Night: Daniel Skibiński
- Knockout of the Night: Piotr Kuberski

=== Results ===
Main card (Canal+ / KSWTV)
Weight class				Method	Round	Time	Notes
Middleweight	Piotr Kuberski (ic)	def.	Radosław Paczuski	KO (head kick)	3	1:18	(Note: For the interim KSW Middleweight Championship.)
Middleweight	Michał Michalski	def.	Andi Vrtačić	Decision (unanimous) (30–27, 30–27, 29–28)	3	5:00
Women's Strawweight	Ewelina Woźniak	def.	Monika Kučinič	Decision (unanimous) (30–27, 30–27, 29–28)	3	5:00
Welterweight	Daniel Skibiński	def.	Oskar Szczepaniak	Submission (rear-naked choke)	2	2:30
Light Heavyweight	Bartosz Szewczyk	def.	Dawid Kasperski	Decision (split) (29–28, 28–29, 29–28)	3	5:00
Featherweight	Josef Štummer	def.	Eduard Kexel	Decision (unanimous) (29–28, 29–28, 29–28)	3	5:00
Preliminary card (YouTube)
Middleweight	Alain Van De Merckt	def.	Borys Dzikowski	Submission (arm-triangle choke)	2	3:28
Welterweight	Viktor Červinský	def.	Michał Gniady	Submission (triangle choke)	2	2:11

== XTB KSW 110: Grzebyk vs. Tulshaev ==
XTB KSW 110: Grzebyk vs. Tulshaev
- Promotion: Konfrontacja Sztuk Walki
- Date: September 20, 2025
- Venue: Hala Podpromie
- City: (Poland) Rzeszów

XTB KSW 110: Grzebyk vs. Tulshaev was a mixed martial arts event held by Konfrontacja Sztuk Walki on September 20, 2025, at the Hala Podpromie in Rzeszów, Poland.

=== Background ===
Bonus awards

The following fighters were awarded bonuses:

- Fight of the Night: Andrzej Grzebyk vs. Muslim Tulshaev
- Submission of the Night: Sebastian Decowski
- Knockout of the Night: Vitaliy Yakimenko

=== Results ===
Main card (Canal+ / KSWTV)
Weight class				Method	Round	Time	Notes
Catchweight (176 lb)	Muslim Tulshaev	def.	Andrzej Grzebyk	TKO (knee and punches)	2	4:09
Welterweight	Madars Fleminas	def.	Tymoteusz Łopaczyk	Decision (split) (30–27, 27–30, 29–28)	3	5:00
Light Heavyweight	Sergiusz Zając	def.	Mariusz Książkiewicz	KO (punches)	1	1:07
Lightweight	Mateusz Makarowski	def.	Welisson Paiva	TKO (punches)	2	3:07
Heavyweight	Szymon Bajor	def.	Ricardo Prasel	Decision (unanimous) (29–28, 29–28, 29–28)	3	5:00
Bantamweight	Vitalii Yakymenko	def.	Rogério Bontorin	TKO (punches)	3	4:30
Featherweight	Łukasz Charzewski	def.	Piotr Kacprzak	Decision (unanimous) (29–28, 29–28, 30–27)	3	5:00	(Note: Kacprzak missed weight (147.7 lb).)
Light Heavyweight	Michał Dreczkowski	def.	Adam Tomasik	TKO (punches)	2	2:33
Preliminary card (YouTube)
Bantamweight	Sebastian Decowski	def.	Przemysław Górny	Submission (scarf hold armlock)	1	1:44	(Note: Decowski missed weight (137 lb).)
Lightweight	Oleksandr Moisa	def.	Krystian Blezień	TKO (punches)	2	1:47

== XTB KSW 111: De Fries vs. Vojčák ==
XTB KSW 111: De Fries vs. Vojčák
- Promotion: Konfrontacja Sztuk Walki
- Date: October 18, 2025
- Venue: Werk Arena
- City: (Czech Republic) Třinec

XTB KSW 111: De Fries vs. Vojčák was a mixed martial arts event held by Konfrontacja Sztuk Walki on October 18, 2025, at the Werk Arena in Třinec, Czech Republic.

=== Background ===
Bonus awards

The following fighters were awarded bonuses:

- Fight of the Night: David Zoula vs. Jan Mašek
- Knockout of the Night: Laura Grzyb and Bartosz Kurek

=== Results ===
Main card (Canal+ / KSWTV)
Weight class				Method	Round	Time	Notes
Heavyweight	Phil De Fries (c)	def.	Štefan Vojčák	TKO (punches)	3	4:27	(Note: For the KSW Heavyweight Championship.)
Light Heavyweight	Rafał Haratyk (c)	def.	Bartosz Leśko	Decision (unanimous) (49–46, 49–46, 49–46)	5	5:00	(Note: For the KSW Light Heavyweight Championship.)
Featherweight	Leo Brichta	def.	Werlleson Martins	TKO (punches)	1	3:27
Welterweight	Mateusz Pawlik	def.	Matúš Juráček	Decision (unanimous) (29–28, 29–28, 29–28)	3	5:00
Catchweight (128 lb)	Laura Grzyb	def.	Karolína Vaňková	KO (punch to the body)	1	0:56
Catchweight (176 lb)	Szymon Karolczyk	def.	Steven Krt	Decision (unanimous) (29–28, 29–28, 29–28)	3	5:00
Middleweight	Bartosz Kurek	def.	Adrian Dudek	KO (punches)	2	4:34
Preliminary card (YouTube)
Bantamweight	Tobiasz Le	def.	Alfan Rocher-Labes	Decision (unanimous) (30–27, 30–27, 30–27)	3	5:00
Heavyweight	Denis Górniak	def.	Kacper Paczóski	TKO (elbows)	2	3:01
Featherweight	Jan Mašek	def.	David Zoula	Decision (unanimous) (29–27, 29–28, 29–28)	3	5:00

== XTB KSW 112: Kaczmarczyk vs. Soldaev ==
XTB KSW 112: Kaczmarczyk vs. Soldaev
- Promotion: Konfrontacja Sztuk Walki
- Date: November 15, 2025
- Venue: Enea Arena
- City: (Poland) Szczecin

XTB KSW 112: Kaczmarczyk vs. Soldaev was a mixed martial arts event held by Konfrontacja Sztuk Walki on November 15, 2025, at the Enea Arena in Szczecin, Poland.

=== Background ===
Bonus awards

The following fighters were awarded bonuses:

- Fight of the Night: Patryk Kaczmarczyk vs. Adam Soldaev
- Submission of the Night: Patryk Kaczmarczyk and Kamil Szkaradek

=== Results ===
Main card (Canal+ / KSWTV)
Weight class				Method	Round	Time	Notes
Featherweight	Patryk Kaczmarczyk	def.	Adam Soldaev	Submission (rear-naked choke)	5	3:17	(Note: For the interim KSW Featherweight Championship.)
Middleweight	Tomasz Romanowski	def.	Alain Van De Merckt	Decision (unanimous) (30–27, 30–27, 29–28)	3	5:00
Lightweight	Marcin Held	def.	Marian Ziółkowski	Decision (unanimous) (29–28, 29–28, 29–28)	3	5:00
Catchweight (161 lb)	Valeriu Mircea	def.	Wilson Varela	Decision (unanimous) (30–27, 30–27, 29–28)	3	5:00
Bantamweight	Kamil Szkaradek	def.	Oleksii Polishchuk	Submission (rear-naked choke)	2	4:44
Catchweight (201 lb)	Cedric Lushima	def.	Wojciech Janusz	Decision (split) (29–28, 28–29, 29–28)	3	5:00
Welterweight	Dawid Kuczmarski	def.	Krystian Kaszubowski	Decision (unanimous) (29–28, 29–28, 29–28)	3	5:00
Preliminary card (YouTube)
Featherweight	Adam Masaev	def.	Maciej Kazieczko	Submission (rear-naked choke)	1	2:33	(Note: Masaev missed weight (162 lb).)
Lightweight	Hugo Deux	def.	Wojciech Kawa	Decision (unanimous) (30–27, 30–26, 30–25)	3	5:00

== XTB KSW 113: Bartosiński vs. Tulshaev ==
XTB KSW 113: Bartosiński vs. Tulshaev
- Promotion: Konfrontacja Sztuk Walki
- Date: December 20, 2025
- Venue: Atlas Arena
- City: (Poland) Łódź

XTB KSW 113: Bartosiński vs. Tulshaev was a mixed martial arts event held by Konfrontacja Sztuk Walki on December 20, 2025, at the Atlas Arena in Łódź, Poland.

=== Background ===
Bonus awards

The following fighters were awarded bonuses:

- Fight of the Night: Adrian Bartosiński vs. Muslim Tulshaev
- Submission of the Night: Paweł Pawlak
- Knockout of the Night: Stjepan Bekavac

=== Results ===
Main card (Canal+ / KSWTV)
Weight class				Method	Round	Time	Notes
Welterweight	Adrian Bartosiński (c)	def.	Muslim Tulshaev	TKO (elbows)	3	4:56	(Note: For the KSW Heavyweight Championship.)
Middleweight	Paweł Pawlak (c)	def.	Laïd Zerhouni	Submission (kneebar)	5	3:09	(Note: For the KSW Middleweight Championship.)
Heavyweight	Artur Szpilka	def.	Michal Martínek	KO (punches)	2	2:07
Catchweight (220 lb)	Adam Josef Modzelewski	def.	Piotr Lisek	KO (punches)	1	1:18	(Note: Exhibition bout.)
Middleweight	Michał Michalski	def.	Damian Janikowski	TKO (punches)	1	4:19
Heavyweight	Stjepan Bekavac	def.	Marcin Różalski	KO (punch)	1	2:59	(Note: K-1 Rules with MMA gloves.)
Heavyweight	Marcin Wójcik	def.	Augusto Sakai	Decision (unanimous) (30–27, 30–27, 30–27)	3	5:00
Welterweight	Wiktor Zalewski	def.	Romain Debienne	TKO (punches)	3	4:06	(Note: Zalewski deducted one point before the fight due to missing weight (174.2 lb).)
Preliminary card (YouTube)
Bantamweight	Marcelo Morelli	def.	Patryk Surdyn	KO (punches)	1	4:56
Lightweight	Igor Włodarczyk	def.	Artur Krawczyk	Submission (rear-naked choke)	1	1:51
Featherweight	Souheil Kaouchen	def.	Krzysztof Geburek	TKO (punches)	1	2:53

== See also ==
- List of current Oktagon MMA fighters
- 2025 in UFC
- 2025 in ONE Championship
- 2025 in Professional Fighters League
- 2025 in Cage Warriors
- 2025 in Absolute Championship Akhmat
- 2025 in Oktagon MMA
- 2025 in Legacy Fighting Alliance
- 2025 in Rizin Fighting Federation
- 2025 in LUX Fight League
- 2025 in Brave Combat Federation
- 2025 in UAE Warriors
