= Piotr Niedzielski =

Polish mixed martial artist (born 1991)

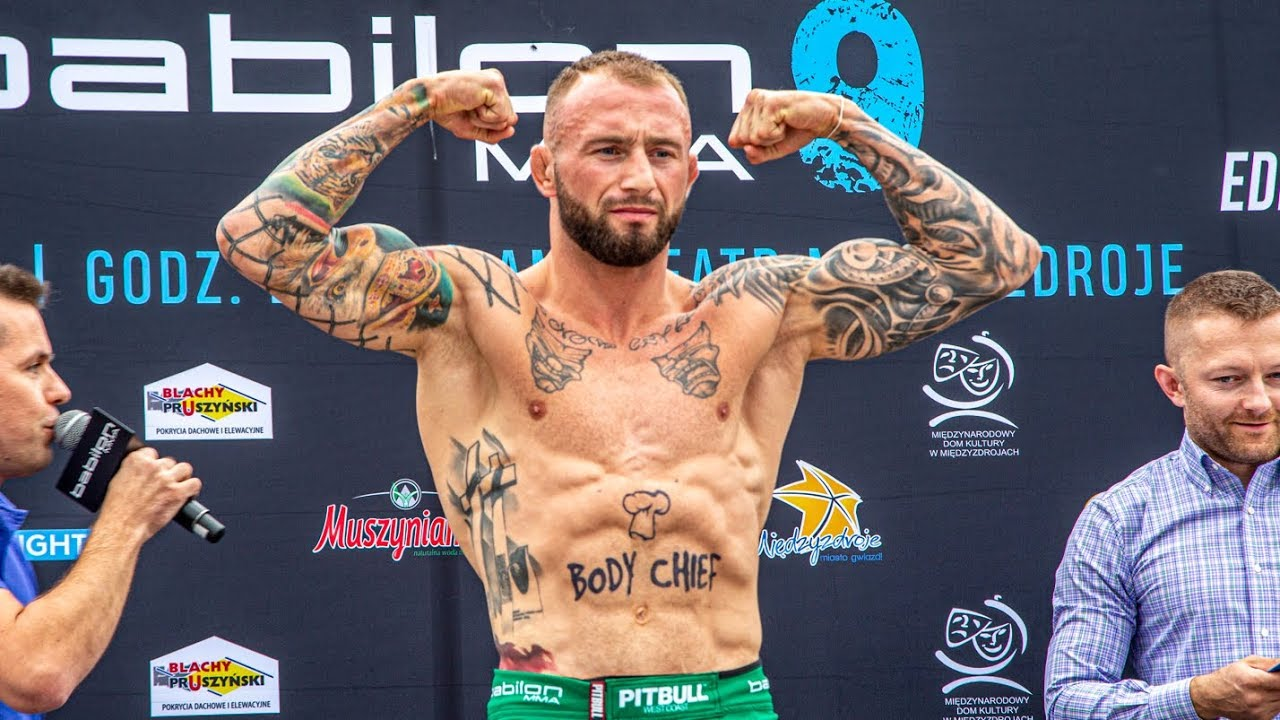
- Niedzielski weighing in before Babilon MMA 9 in 2019
- Born: Piotr Niedzielski; January 12, 1991 (age 35); Poznań, Poland
- Other names: Niedziela
- Height: 5 ft 9 in (1.75 m)
- Weight: 154 lb (70 kg; 11 st 0 lb)
- Division: Featherweight (2022–2023); Lightweight (2010, 2014–2017, 2019–2021, 2024); Welterweight (2018, 2024–present)
- Reach: 68.5 in (174 cm)
- Style: Brazilian Jiu-jitsu
- Fighting out of: Poznań, Poland
- Team: Czerwony Smok
- Years active: 2010, 2014–present

Mixed martial arts record
- Total: 33
- Wins: 22
- By knockout: 6
- By submission: 7
- By decision: 9
- Losses: 11
- By knockout: 1
- By submission: 3
- By decision: 7

Other information
- Mixed martial arts record from Sherdog

Piotr Niedzielski (born January 12, 1991) is a Polish professional mixed martial artist. He currently competes in the Welterwight division. He was the inaugural Babilon MMA Lightweight champion. He has previously competed on Bellator MMA and UAE Warriors.

== Professional career ==
=== Early career ===
Niedzielski made his professional debut on April 25, 2010, against Mikołaj Żukowski. Niedzielski won the fight via a first-round submission.

=== Slugfest MMA ===
After accumulating a career record of 2–1, Niedzielski made his debut under Slugfest MMA on December 13, 2014, against Wojciech Marjański. Niedzielski won the fight via a second-round submission.

Following a one-off fight on the regionals, he returned to Slugfest on June 6, 2015, against Michal Mokrý. Niedzielski won the fight via a Unanimous Decision.

=== International fights ===
After another one-off fight on the regionals, Niedzielski fought in his first fight in a different country. He faced Luka Jelčić on April 9, 2016, for the vacant Total Extreme Fighting Championship Lightweight championship. Niedzielski lost the fight via a first-round submission.

His next fight came on August 27, 2016, against Valeriu Mircea. Niedzielski lost the fight via a Unanimous Decision. Despite the loss, he earned his first career Fight of the Night bonus.

=== Return to Slugfest MMA ===
He returned to Slugfest MMA on December 10, 2016, against Martin Hajtmar. Niedzielski won the fight via a second-round TKO.

=== Return to regionals ===
His next fight came on February 18, 2017, against Kacper Koziorzębski in his hometown of Poznań. Niedzielski won the fight via a first-round TKO.

His next fight came on April 1, 2017, against Alan Langer. Niedzielski lost the fight via a Unanimous Decision.

His next fight came on October 14, 2017, against Saulius Bucius. Niedzielski won the fight via a Unanimous Decision.

=== Babilon MMA ===
Niedzielski made his debut under Babilon MMA on June 8, 2018, against Mateusz Zawadzki. Niedzielski won the fight via a second-round TKO.

After a one-off fight on the regionals, he returned to Babilon MMA on January 25, 2019, against Oleksandr Horshechnik. Niedzielski won the fight via a Unanimous Decision.

After another one-off fight on the regionals, he returned to Babilon MMA on August 16, 2019, against Uelliton Silva. Niedzielski won the fight via a Unanimous Decision.

His next fight came on February 7, 2020, against Marcos Schmitz in a title eliminator. Niedzielski won the fight via a first-round submission.

==== Babilon MMA Lightweight Champion ====
Niedzielski faced Ivan Vulchin for the inaugural Babilon MMA Lightweight championship on September 11, 2021. Niedzielski won the fight via a second-round knockout, winning his first career championship in the process.

=== Bellator MMA ===
On March 12, 2022, it was announced that Niedzielski had signed a contract with Bellator MMA. In his debut, he faced Pedro Carvalho on May 6, 2022, at Bellator 280. Niedzielski won the fight via a Split Decision.

His next fight came on February 25, 2023, against Richie Smullen at Bellator 291. Niedzielski lost the fight via a Split Decision.

His next fight came on May 12, 2023, against Yves Landu at Bellator 296. Before the fight, Niedzielski missed weight by 1.2 lbs. Niedzielski lost the fight via a Unanimous Decision.

His final fight under Bellator came on September 23, 2023, against Khasan Magomedsharipov at Bellator 299. He took this fight on eight days notice, as Khasan's original opponent, Martin McDonough, withdrew. Before the fight, Niedzielski missed weight for a second time, this time by 2.8 lbs. Due to this, the bout proceeded as a catchweight, and Niedzielski was fined 20 percent of his purse. Niedzielski lost the fight via a second-round submission.

=== CaveMMA ===
Following his stint in Bellator MMA, Niedzielski returned to his native Poland where he competed under local federation CaveMMA. He faced Levan Kirtadze on March 1, 2024. Niedzielski won the fight via a Split Decision.

=== War MMA ===
Niedzielski made his debut under Spain-based federation War MMA on August 24, 2024, against Felipe Maia. Niedzielski won the fight via a first-round submission.

His next fight came on April 5, 2025, in a rematch against Felipe Maia. Niedzielski won the fight via a first-round knockout.

=== UAE Warriors ===
Niedzielski made his debut under UAE Warriors on June 13, 2025, against Vladyslav Rudnev. Niedzielski lost the fight via a Unanimous Decision.

=== King's Arena ===
Niedzielski fought on the inaugural King's Arena event which took place on September 13, 2025. He faced Giorgi Esiava. Niedzielski won the fight via a Unanimous Decision.

=== Shlemenko Fighting Championship ===
On November 13, 2025, it was announced that Niedzielski will be facing Andrey Koreshkov under Russian federation Shlemenko Fighting Championship on December 13, 2025, with Niedzielski being the first Polish fighter to compete on Russian soil in three years. Niedzielski lost the fight via a second-round TKO.

=== Return to King's Arena ===
Niedzielski returned to King's Arena on February 7, 2026, where he faced Levan Kirtadze in a rematch after their last bout 2 years prior. Niedzielski won the fight via a Split Decision.

=== Fight Nation Championship ===
Niedzielski made his debut under Croatian federation Fight Nation Championship on May 30, 2026, against Marko Bojković. Niedzielski lost the fight via a Unanimous Decision.

== Championships and accomplishments ==
=== Mixed martial arts ===
- Babilon MMA
  - Babilon MMA Lightweight Champion (One time; former)
- World Freefight Challenge
  - Fight of the Night (One time)

== Mixed martial arts record ==
Professional record breakdown
33 matches	22 wins	11 losses
By knockout	6	1
By submission	7	3
By decision	9	7

Res.	Record	Opponent	Method	Event	Date	Round	Time	Location	Notes
Loss	22–11	Karomatullo Sufiev	Submission (rear-naked choke)	FNC 35	November 7, 2026	1	4:53	Podgorica, Montenegro	Catchweight (163 lb) bout.
Loss	22–10	Marko Bojković	Decision (unanimous)	FNC 31	May 30, 2026	3	5:00	Belgrade, Serbia	Catchweight (161 lb) bout.
Win	22–9	Levan Kirtadze	Decision (split)	King's Arena 2	February 7, 2026	3	5:00	Olsztyn, Poland	Return to Lightweight.
Loss	21–9	Andrey Koreshkov	TKO (punches)	Shlemenko FC 12	December 13, 2025	2	3:23	Omsk, Russia	
Win	21–8	Giorgi Esiava	Decision (unanimous)	King's Arena 1	September 13, 2025	3	5:00	Poznań, Poland	
Loss	20–8	Vladyslav Rudnev	Decision (unanimous)	UAE Warriors 60	June 13, 2025	3	5:00	Abu Dhabi, United Arab Emirates	Catchweight (163 lb) bout.
Win	20–7	Felipe da Silva Maia	TKO (body kick)	World Athlete Radical 5	April 5, 2025	1	0:57	Cartagena, Spain	
Win	19–7	Felipe da Silva Maia	Submission (guillotine choke)	World Athlete Radical 3	August 24, 2024	1	0:44	Benidorm, Spain	Return to Welterweight.
Win	18–7	Levan Kirtadze	Decision (split)	CaveMMA 4	March 1, 2024	3	5:00	Jastrzębie-Zdrój, Poland	Lightweight bout.
Loss	17–7	Khasan Magomedsharipov	Submission (arm-triangle choke)	Bellator 299	September 23, 2023	2	3:58	Dublin, Ireland	Catchweight (147.8 lb) bout; Niedzielski missed weight.
Loss	17–6	Yves Landu	Decision (unanimous)	Bellator 296	May 12, 2023	3	5:00	Paris, France	Catchweight (146.2 lb) bout; Niedzielski missed weight.
Loss	17–5	Richie Smullen	Decision (split)	Bellator 291	February 25, 2023	3	5:00	Dublin, Ireland	
Win	17–4	Pedro Carvalho	Decision (split)	Bellator 280	May 6, 2022	3	5:00	Paris, France	Featherweight debut.
Win	16–4	Ivan Vulchin	KO (punch)	Babilon MMA 24	September 11, 2021	2	0:45	Żyrardów, Poland	Won the inaugural Babilon MMA Lightweight Championship.
Win	15–4	Marcos Schmitz	Submission (guillotine choke)	Babilon MMA 12	February 7, 2020	1	3:53	Łomża, Poland	Catchweight (162 lb) bout.
Win	14–4	Uelliton Silva	Decision (unanimous)	Babilon MMA 9	August 16, 2019	3	5:00	Międzyzdroje, Poland	
Win	13–4	Ričardas Vaičys	KO (body kick)	Grupa MTP: Poznań Fight Show Night	May 25, 2019	1	0:47	Poznań, Poland	Catchweight (174 lb) bout.
Win	12–4	Oleksandr Horshechnik	Decision (unanimous)	Babilon MMA 7	January 25, 2019	3	5:00	Żyrardów, Poland	Return to Lightweight.
Win	11–4	Mateusz Strzelczyk	Submission (guillotine choke)	Gala Sportów Walki 9	October 27, 2018	1	N/A	Międzychód, Poland	Catchweight (168 lb) bout.
Win	10–4	Mateusz Zawadzki	TKO (body kick and punches)	Babilon MMA 4	June 8, 2018	2	3:23	Ełk, Poland	Welterweight debut.
Win	9–4	Saulius Bucius	Decision (unanimous)	Gala Sportów Walki 8	October 14, 2017	3	5:00	Międzychód, Poland	Catchweight (161 lb) bout.
Loss	8–4	Alan Langer	Decision (unanimous)	Spartan Fight 7	April 1, 2017	3	5:00	Chorzów, Poland	
Win	8–3	Kacper Koziorzębski	TKO (punches)	X Fights Series: Poznań Fight Night 2	February 18, 2017	1	1:05	Poznań, Poland	
Win	7–3	Martin Hajtmar	TKO (doctor stoppage)	Slugfest 9	December 10, 2016	2	5:00	Września, Poland	
Loss	6–3	Valeriu Mircea	Decision (unanimous)	World Freefight Challenge 20	August 27, 2016	3	5:00	Bad Vöslau, Poland	Fight of the Night.
Loss	6–2	Luka Jelčić	Submission (rear-naked choke)	Total Extreme Fighting 1	April 9, 2016	1	N/A	Dublin, Ireland	For the inaugural TEF Lightweight championship.
Win	6–1	Péter Akors Váradi	Submission (arm-triangle choke)	Pawel Kaminski Memorial 4	November 7, 2015	3	0:58	Gniezno, Poland	
Win	5–1	Michal Mokrý	Decision (unanimous)	Slugfest 4	June 6, 2015	3	5:00	Murowana Goślina, Poland	Catchweight (159 lb) bout.
Win	4–1	Marcin Mazurek	Submission (guillotine choke)	Arena Berserkerów 7	March 14, 2015	1	2:15	Szczecin, Poland	
Win	3–1	Wojciech Marjański	Submission (guillotine choke)	Slugfest 2	December 13, 2014	2	1:04	Września, Poland	
Win	2–1	Sergiusz Uzarek	Decision (majority)	Pawel Kaminski Memorial 3	October 25, 2014	3	5:00	Gniezno, Poland	
Loss	1–1	Kamil Gniadek	Decision (unanimous)	Arena Berserkerów 6	June 7, 2014	3	5:00	Police, Poland	Arena Berserkerów Lightweight Tournament Quarterfinal.
Win	1–0	Mikołaj Żukowski	Submission (guillotine choke)	Red Dragon Poznań: K-1 Against Drugs	April 25, 2010	1	2:06	Luboń, Poland	Lightweight debut.

== See also ==
- List of male mixed martial artists
