= Super welterweight (MMA) =

MMA weight class

The super welterweight division in MMA sits between the welterweight division and the middleweight division. It was approved by the Association of Boxing Commissions on July 26, 2017. The upper limit was set at 175 lb (79.4 kg).

In 2019, Bahrain-based promotion Brave Combat Federation revised its welterweight division and title from 170 lbs to 175 lbs.
