= Ożarów Mazowiecki =

Town in Masovian Voivodeship, Poland

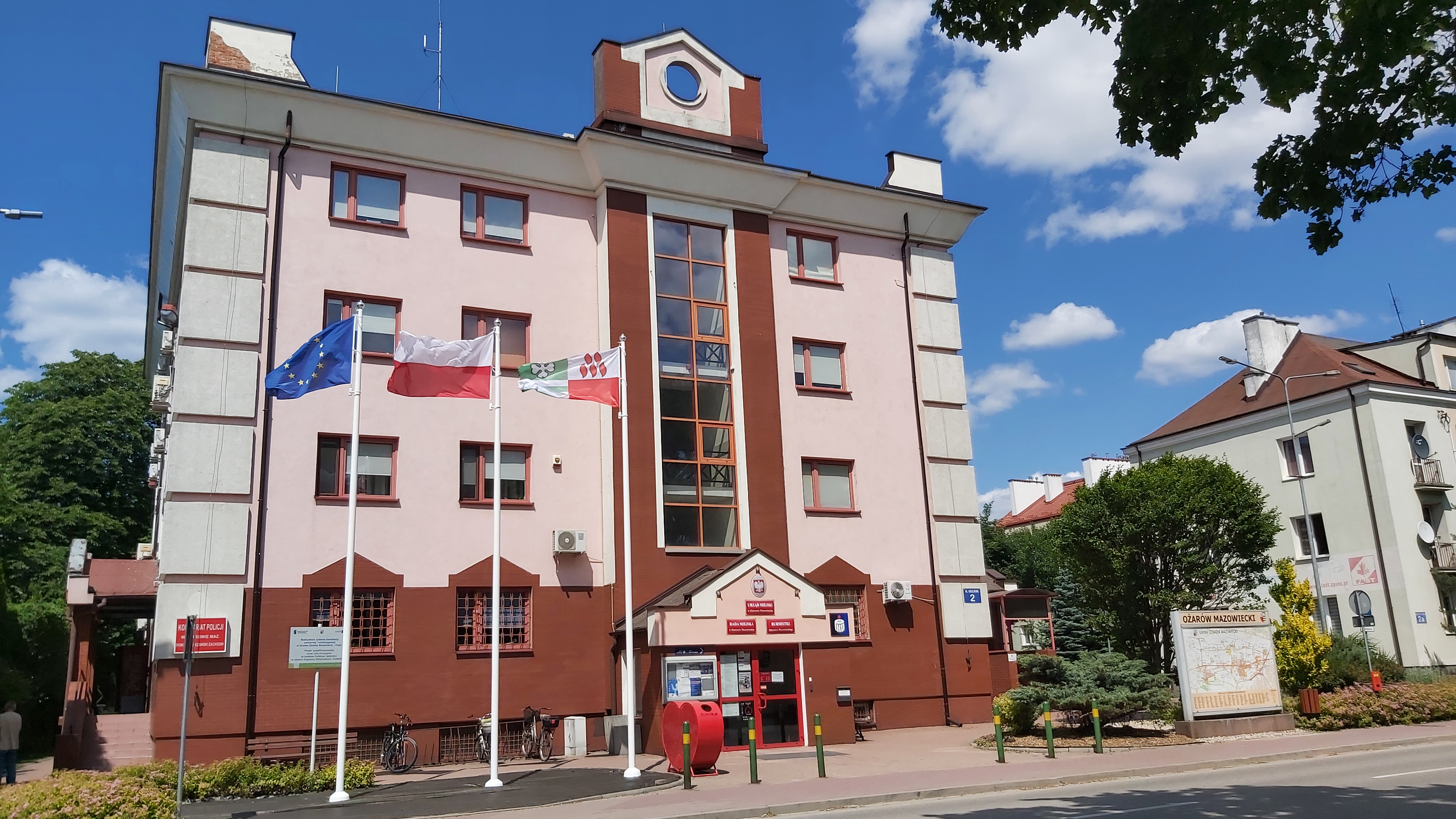
- Town hall

- Flag Coat of arms

- Location within Poland
- Coordinates: 52°13′N 20°48′E
- Country: Poland
- Voivodeship: Masovian
- County: Warsaw West
- Gmina: Ożarów Mazowiecki
- First mentioned: 15th century
- Town rights: 1967

Government
  - Mayor: Paweł Kanclerz

Area
  - Total: 5.75 km^{2} (2.22 sq mi)

Population (2018)
  - Total: 11,311
  - Density: 1,970/km^{2} (5,090/sq mi)
- Time zone: UTC+1 (CET)
  - Summer (DST): UTC+2 (CEST)
- Postal code: 05-850
- Area code: +48 22
- Car plates: WZ
- Website: http://www.ozarow-mazowiecki.pl

Ożarów Mazowiecki [ɔˈʐaruf mazɔˈvʲɛt͡skʲi] is a town in Poland, in Masovian Voivodship, in the Warsaw metropolitan area, just to the west of Warsaw. It is the capital of Warsaw West County (since January 1, 2006). Its population numbers 11,311 (2018).

== History ==
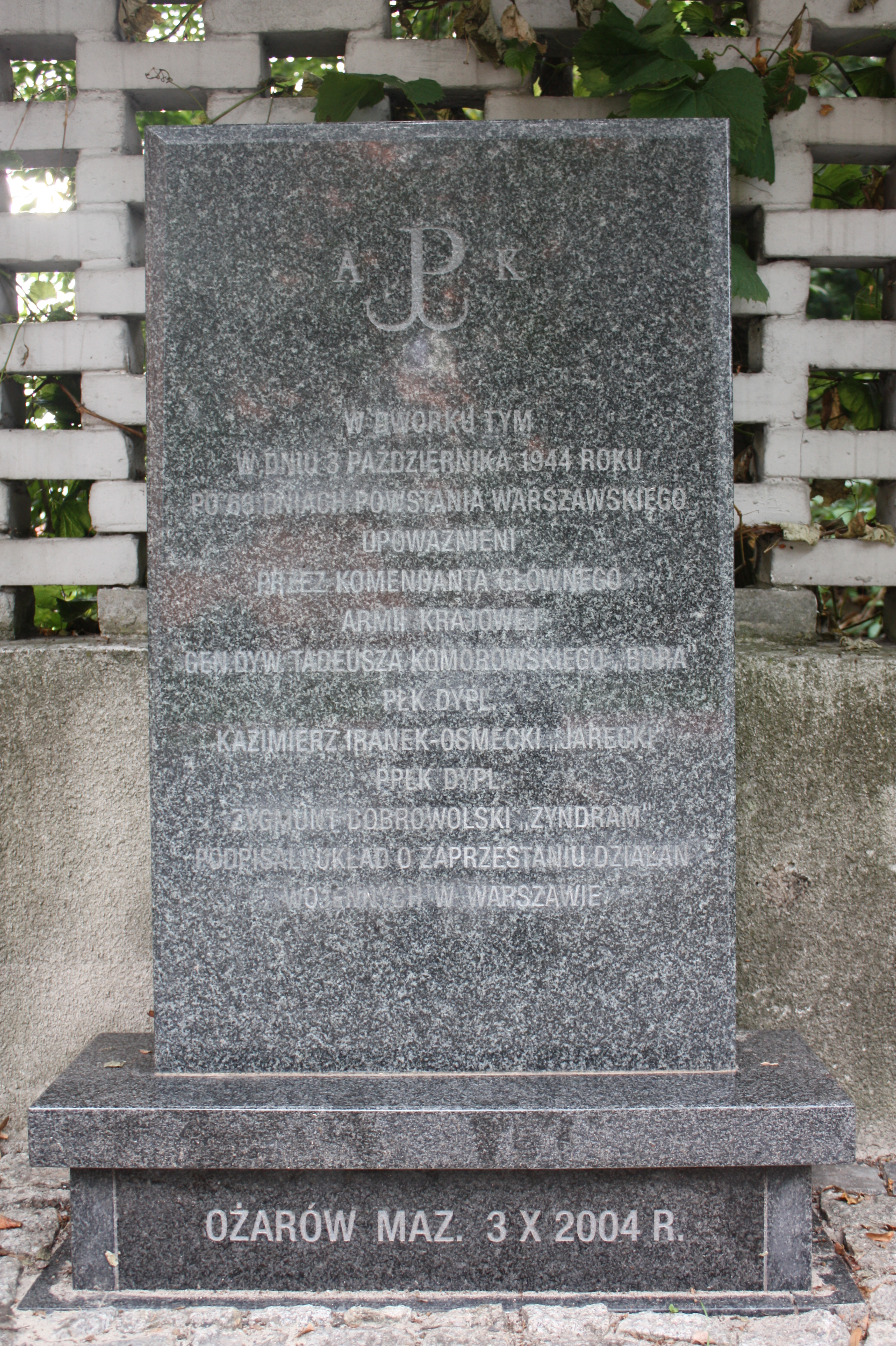
Old manor house where the end of the Warsaw Uprising of 1944 was signed, with a memorial

Within the Kingdom of Poland, Ożarów was administratively located in the Warsaw Land, Masovian Voivodeship, Greater Poland Province.

Following the joint German-Soviet invasion of Poland, which started World War II in September 1939, Ożarów was occupied by Germany until 1945. The Polish resistance movement was present in Ożarów. There was a local branch of the Home Army in Ożarów, which took part in the fighting against the Germans at the beginning of the Warsaw Uprising in 1944. On 2 October 1944, an agreement was reached in Ożarów to end the fighting in the Warsaw Uprising.

== Transport ==
The Polish National road 92 and Voivodeship roads 701, 718, 735 pass through Ożarów, and the A2 motorway runs nearby, south of the town.

== Economy ==
Notable companies headquartered in the town include electronics and aeronautics manufacturer WB Group as well as technological company Vigo Photonics S.A. whose high sensitivity infrared detectors were used in the Curiosity Mars rover.

There was a glass factory in Ożarów from 1907 to 2001.
