= Vladyslav Rudnev =

Ukrainian sambist and mixed martial arts (MMA) fighter

- Born: Vladyslav Serhiyovych Rudnev; June 25, 1996 (age 30); Kyiv, Ukraine
- Other names: Honey
- Nationality: Ukrainian
- Height: 5 ft 10 in (1.78 m)
- Weight: 155 lb (70 kg; 11 st 1 lb)
- Division: Lightweight; Middleweight; Welterweight
- Style: Judo sambo
- Fighting out of: Poznań, Poland
- Team: Czerwony Smok
- Years active: 2019–present

Mixed martial arts record
- Total: 12
- Wins: 12
- By knockout: 2
- By submission: 3
- By decision: 7
- Losses: 0

Other information
- Mixed martial arts record from Sherdog

Vladyslav Serhiyovych Rudnev (Ukrainian: Владислав Сергійович Руднєв; born June 25, 1996) is a Ukrainian sambist and mixed martial artist. As a sambist, he is a two-time gold medalist at the World Games, five-time world champion, four-time European champion and is a member of Dynamo.

== Sambo career ==
Rudnev won his first medal in the European Sambo Championships in 2016, in which he won a bronze medal in the -82 kg category. He subsequently went on to win a gold medal in this competition in 2018 and 2019 in the same category. He won his third gold medal in the European championships in 2021, this time in the -79 kg category. At the 2024 European Sambo Championships in Novi Sad. Serbia, he won the gold medal in combat sambo again in the -79 kg category, defeating Ivan Lozhkin in the final.

At the World Sambo Championships, Rudnev won a bronze medal in 2017. He would win a gold medal in 2018. He repeated this feat in 2019 and 2020, all in the -82 kg category. Rudnev would win his fourth gold medal in the world championships in 2021. He won his fifth gold medal at the World Sambo Championships in 2024.

At the 2025 World Games, Rudnev won the gold medal in the Men's 79 kg category. He was also part of the men's team that won the gold medal, after which he declared his amateur career over.

== Mixed martial arts career ==
Rudnev started his professional MMA career in 2019.

Rudnev faced Anthony Dizy on September 7, 2023, at Brave CF 74. He won the bout by unanimous decision.

Rudnev faced Iliyar Askhanov at November 4, 2023, at Rizin Landmark 7. He won the bout by unanimous decision.

== Mixed martial arts record ==
Professional record breakdown
13 matches	13 wins	0 losses
By knockout	2	0
By submission	4	0
By decision	7	0

Res.	Record	Opponent	Method	Event	Date	Round	Time	Location	Notes
Win	13–0	Martun Mezhlumyan	Submission (rear-naked choke)	UAE Warriors 71	May 9, 2026	1	3:48	Abu Dhabi, United Arab Emirates	Won the vacant UAE Warriors Lightweight Championship.
Win	12–0	Nonato Junior	TKO (punches)	Balu Fighting League Pro: Rudnev vs. Nonato Jr.	January 31, 2026	1	1:35	Kyiv, Ukraine	
Win	11–0	Piotr Niedzielski	Decision (unanimous)	UAE Warriors 60	June 13, 2025	3	5:00	Abu Dhabi, United Arab Emirates	Catchweight (163 lb) bout.
Win	10–0	Nurkhan Zhumagazy	Technical Submission (rear-naked choke)	UAE Warriors 51	July 27, 2024	2	2:59	Abu Dhabi, United Arab Emirates	Catchweight (160 lb) bout.
Win	9–0	Nika Kupravishvili	Decision (unanimous)	UAE Warriors 50	May 18, 2024	5	5:00	Abu Dhabi, United Arab Emirates	Catchweight (163 lb) bout.
Win	8–0	Iliyar Askhanov	Decision (unanimous)	Rizin Landmark 7	November 4, 2023	3	5:00	Baku, Azerbaijan	
Win	7–0	Anthony Dizy	Decision (unanimous)	Brave CF 74	September 7, 2023	3	5:00	Nantes, France	Lightweight debut.
Win	6–0	Mikolaj Krukowski	TKO (punches)	Eliminator Fight Night 4	May 6, 2023	1	0:59	Nowy Tomyśl, Poland	
Win	5–0	Ion Petrov	Decision (unanimous)	FEA: Take Off	April 8, 2023	3	5:00	Ciorescu, Moldova	Welterweight bout.
Win	4–0	Rafael Aronov	Decision (unanimous)	Zuri MMA International 1	November 10, 2022	3	5:00	Ashkelon, Israel	Middleweight debut.
Win	3–0	Viliyan Viliyanov	Submission (triangle choke)	Real Pain Challenge: Battle for the Docks	July 29, 2022	1	2:45	Burgas, Bulgaria	
Win	2–0	Anton Radko	Decision (unanimous)	Golden Coat FC 10	August 10, 2020	3	5:00	Kyiv, Ukraine	
Win	1–0	Andrey Savchuk	Submission (triangle choke)	Golden Coat FC 8	August 17, 2019	1	2:12	Kyiv, Ukraine	Welterweight debut.
