= Alex da Silva Coelho =

Brazilian mixed martial arts fighter

- Born: February 4, 1996 (age 30); Içara, Brazil
- Other names: Leko
- Height: 5 ft 8 in (1.73 m)
- Weight: 155 lb (70 kg; 11 st 1 lb)
- Division: Lightweight
- Reach: 73 in (185 cm)
- Fighting out of: Balneário Camboriú, Santa Catarina, Brazil
- Team: Astra Fight Team
- Years active: 2014–present

Mixed martial arts record
- Total: 32
- Wins: 26
- By knockout: 15
- By submission: 9
- By decision: 2
- Losses: 6
- By knockout: 1
- By submission: 1
- By decision: 4

Other information
- Mixed martial arts record from Sherdog

Alex da Silva Coelho (born February 4, 1996) is a Brazilian mixed martial artist who competes in the Lightweight division. A professional since 2014, he most notably competed for the Ultimate Fighting Championship (UFC).

== Mixed martial arts career ==
=== Early career ===
Silva started his career in mixed martial arts at the age of 18, and won 20 of 21 bouts, mainly competing for Aspera FC, between 2014 and 2019. He had then-teammate and future UFC star Darren Till, as one of his early mentors through his journey fighting in the Regional MMA scene. After amassing a record of 20–1 (which included 20 finishes), he signed his contract with the UFC, and would quit his job as a security guard in Santa Catarina, Brazil.

=== Ultimate Fighting Championship ===
Silva made his promotional debut against Alexander Yakovlev as a late replacement for Teemu Packalen on April 20, 2019, at UFC Fight Night 149. He lost the fight via guillotine choke submission in the second round.

Silva faced Kazula Vargas at UFC Fight Night: Shevchenko vs. Carmouche 2 on August 10, 2019. He out grappled Vargas throughout the fight and won it via unanimous decision.

Silva faced Brad Riddell at UFC 253 September 27, 2020. He lost the fight via unanimous decision.

Silva was expected to face Devonte Smith on February 6, 2021, at UFC Fight Night 184. However, Silva pulled out due to undisclosed reasons. He was replaced by Justin Jaynes.

Silva faced Joe Solecki on June 4, 2022, at UFC Fight Night 207. He lost the fight via majority decision after a point deduction was given to Silva due to repeatedly locking his toes in the fence.

On June 8, 2022, it was confirmed that Silva was no longer on the UFC roster.

=== Post UFC ===
In his first bout after leaving the UFC, Silva faced Makkasharip Zaynukov on March 18, 2023, at UAE Warriors 39, losing by split decision.

Silva rebounded in his next bout at UAE Warriors 42 on May 20, 2023, against Ali Mashrapov, knocking him out via knee in the third round.

Silva would next face Bagysh Zharmamatov on August 26, 2023, at UAE Warriors 44, submitting him with a guillotine choke in less than a minute.

Silva fought Dinislam Kamavov on January 20, 2024 at UAE Warriors 46, winning the bout via unanimous decision.

== Mixed martial arts record ==
Professional record breakdown
32 matches	26 wins	6 losses
By knockout	15	1
By submission	9	1
By decision	2	4

Res.	Record	Opponent	Method	Event	Date	Round	Time	Location	Notes
Win	26–6	Arbi Mezhidov	Submission (anaconda choke)	UAE Warriors 69	March 28, 2026	2	0:44	Al Ain, United Arab Emirates	Catchweight (168 lb) bout.
Win	25–6	Kurbanali Isabekov	KO (punch)	UAE Warriors 63	September 10, 2025	2	4:42	Al Ain, United Arab Emirates	Catchweight (159 lb) bout.
Loss	24–6	Amru Magomedov	TKO (body kick and punches)	UAE Warriors 58	February 22, 2025	1	2:08	Al Ain, United Arab Emirates	For the UAE Warriors Lightweight Championship.
Win	24–5	Dinislam Kamavov	Decision (unanimous)	UAE Warriors 46	20 January 2024	3	5:00	Abu Dhabi, United Arab Emirates	
Win	23–5	Bagysh Zharmamatov	Submission (guillotine choke)	UAE Warriors 44	26 August 2023	1	0:41	Abu Dhabi, United Arab Emirates	Catchweight (163 lb) bout.
Win	22–5	Ali Mashrapov	KO (knee)	UAE Warriors 42	20 May 2023	3	1:38	Abu Dhabi, United Arab Emirates	Catchweight (160 lb) bout.
Loss	21–5	Makkasharip Zaynukov	Decision (split)	UAE Warriors 39	18 March 2023	3	5:00	Abu Dhabi, United Arab Emirates	Catchweight (161 lb) bout.
Loss	21–4	Joe Solecki	Decision (majority)	UFC Fight Night: Volkov vs. Rozenstruik	4 June 2022	3	5:00	Las Vegas, Nevada, United States	Coelho was deducted one point in round 2 for repeatedly locking his toes in the fence.
Loss	21–3	Brad Riddell	Decision (unanimous)	UFC 253	26 September 2020	3	5:00	Abu Dhabi, United Arab Emirates	
Win	21–2	Kazula Vargas	Decision (unanimous)	UFC Fight Night: Shevchenko vs. Carmouche 2	10 August 2019	3	5:00	Montevideo, Uruguay	
Loss	20–2	Alexander Yakovlev	Submission (guillotine choke)	UFC Fight Night: Overeem vs. Oleinik	20 April 2019	2	3:10	Saint Petersburg, Russia	
Win	20–1	Slavoljub Mitić	TKO (doctor stoppage)	Serbian Battle Championship 19	1 December 2018	1	1:11	Novi Sad, Serbia	
Win	19–1	Fernando Colman	Submission (guillotine choke)	Aspera FC 57	9 September 2017	1	2:49	Florianópolis, Brazil	Return to Lightweight.
Loss	18–1	Jakub Kowalewicz	Decision (unanimous)	Brave CF 5	22 April 2017	3	5:00	Mumbai, India	
Win	18–0	Daniel Swain	TKO (punches)	Brave CF 2	2 December 2016	2	4:37	Isa Town, Bahrain	
Win	17–0	Marcelo Rodrigues Piazza Santos	TKO (punches)	Aspera FC 41	9 July 2016	2	1:00	São José, Brazil	
Win	16–0	Welinton Dias	KO (punch)	Aspera FC 33	19 March 2016	1	1:07	São José, Brazil	
Win	15–0	Wesley dos Santos	TKO (punches)	K.O. Combate 2	21 November 2015	1	4:51	Caçador, Brazil	
Win	14–0	Guilherme Batista	TKO (punches)	Blasius Combat 2	7 November 2015	1	1:17	São Ludgero, Brazil	
Win	13–0	Gabriel Vieira das Neves	TKO (elbows)	Aspera FC 25	17 October 2015	1	2:48	Curitibanos, Brazil	Return to Featherweight.
Win	12–0	Silvio Fernandes	KO (knee)	Aspera FC 22	12 July 2015	1	0:44	Cocal do Sul, Brazil	Lightweight bout.
Win	11–0	Luis Fernando Messa	TKO (elbows)	Aspera FC 21	26 June 2015	1	4:26	São Paulo, Brazil	Featherweight bout.
Win	10–0	Mateus Santana Dias	KO (punch)	Fox Fight 1	13 June 2015	1	1:55	Joaçaba, Brazil	
Win	9–0	Marcelo Boldrini	TKO (punches)	Aspera FC 17	4 April 2015	1	4:07	Curitibanos, Brazil	Featherweight bout.
Win	8–0	Fernando Scariot	Submission (rear-naked choke)	Aspera FC 14	29 November 2014	2	2:56	Lages, Brazil	Featherweight bout.
Win	7–0	Antônio Marcos Pereira	Submission (rear-naked choke)	Aspera FC 11	30 August 2014	1	3:12	Curitibanos, Brazil	Featherweight bout.
Win	6–0	Celso Ferreira	Submission (rear-naked choke)	Curitiba Fight Pro 2	9 August 2014	1	4:50	Curitiba, Brazil	Featherweight bout.
Win	5–0	Herison Oliveira	TKO (punches)	Aspera FC 8	14 June 2014	1	1:16	Paranaguá, Brazil	
Win	4–0	Jeferson Lins	Submission (rear-naked choke)	Aspera FC 7	25 May 2014	1	3:20	Itajaí, Brazil	
Win	3–0	Guilherme Souza	TKO (doctor stoppage)	Curitiba Fight Pro	22 February 2014	1	N/A	Xaxim, Brazil	
Win	2–0	Douglas Carvalho	Submission (triangle choke)	Aspera FC 3	16 February 2014	1	4:16	Itajaí, Brazil	
Win	1–0	Igor Duarte	KO (head kick)	Aspera FC 2	18 January 2014	1	2:20	Itajaí, Brazil	

== See also ==
- List of male mixed martial artists
