= 2025 in UAE Warriors =

Information
- First date: February 22, 2025
- Last date: December 11, 2025

Events
- Total events: 9

Fights
- Total fights: 112
- Title fights: 7

Chronology
2024 in UAE Warriors	2025 in UAE Warriors	2026 in UAE Warriors

The year 2025 is the 13th year in the history of UAE Warriors, a mixed martial arts promotion based in United Arab Emirates.

== List of events ==
#	Event	Date	Venue	Location
1	UAE Warriors 58	February 22, 2025	ADNEC Centre	Al Ain, United Arab Emirates
2	UAE Warriors 59	June 12, 2025	Space42 Arena	Abu Dhabi, United Arab Emirates
3	UAE Warriors 60	June 13, 2025	Space42 Arena	Abu Dhabi, United Arab Emirates
4	UAE Warriors 61	July 23, 2025	Space42 Arena	Abu Dhabi, United Arab Emirates
5	UAE Warriors 62	July 24, 2025	Space42 Arena	Abu Dhabi, United Arab Emirates
6	UAE Warriors 63	September 10, 2025	ADNEC Centre Al Ain	Al Ain, United Arab Emirates
7	UAE Warriors 64	October 22, 2025	ADNEC Centre	Abu Dhabi, United Arab Emirates
8	UAE Warriors 65	November 15, 2025	ADNEC Centre Al Ain	Al Ain, United Arab Emirates
9	UAE Warriors 66	December 11, 2025	Fouad Chehab Stadium	Jounieh, Lebanon

== UAE Warriors 58 ==
UAE Warriors 58: Magomedov vs. da Silva
- Promotion: UAE Warriors
- Date: February 22, 2025
- Venue: ADNEC Centre
- City: Al Ain, United Arab Emirates

UAE Warriors 58: Magomedov vs. da Silva was a mixed martial arts event held by UAE Warriors on February 22, 2025, in Al Ain, United Arab Emirates.

=== Background ===
A UAE Warriors Lightweight Championship bout between current champion Amru Magomedov and UFC veteran Alex da Silva Coelho headlined the event.

=== Results ===
Main card (UFC Fight Pass)
Weight class				Method	Round	Time	Notes
Lightweight	Amru Magomedov (c)	def.	Alex da Silva Coelho	TKO (body kick and punches)	1	2:08	(Note: For the UAE Warriors Lightweight Championship.)
Bantamweight	Rany Saadeh	def.	Hikaru Yoshino	Decision (unanimous) (29–28, 29–28, 29–28)	3	5:00
Lightweight	Magomed Zaynukov	def.	Shakhmar Sadygov	Decision (unanimous) (30–27, 30–27, 29–28)	3	5:00
Flyweight	Victor Nunes	def.	Genil Francisco	KO (punch)	1	2:43
Flyweight	Rashid Vagabov	def.	Denis Araujo	Submission (rear-naked choke)	2	2:00
Preliminary card (UFC Fight Pass)
Featherweight	Akbarjon Islomboev	def.	Daan Duijs	Decision (unanimous) (30–27, 30–27, 30–27)	3	5:00
Middleweight	Abdurakhman Alimagomedov	def.	Imran Taysultanov	Submission (kimura)	1	2:10
Bantamweight	Abdul Hussein	def.	Eduardo Mora	Submission (bulldog choke)	2	2:55
Heavyweight	Gadzhi Abdulkadirov	def.	Michel Góes	TKO (punches)	1	3:55
Women's Bantamweight	Cláudia Pereira Leite	def.	Annie Thatcher	Submission (rear-naked choke)	3	4:13
Welterweight	Amir Hossein Alipour	def.	Ulugbek Rakhmonov	Decision (unanimous) (30–27, 30–27, 29–28)	3	5:00
Catchweight (194 lb)	Imamshafi Aliev	def.	Pedro Oliveira	Decision (unanimous) (29–28, 29–28, 29–28)	3	5:00
Welterweight	Dominykas Norkus	def.	Khaled Taraf	Technical Submission (rear-naked choke)	1	3:50
Bantamweight	Kurban Zaynukov	def.	Elkhan Hasanov	Technical Submission (guillotine choke)	2	2:22

== UAE Warriors 59 ==
UAE Warriors 59: Arabia vs. Africa
- Promotion: UAE Warriors
- Date: June 12, 2025
- Venue: Space42 Arena
- City: Abu Dhabi, United Arab Emirates

UAE Warriors 59: Arabia vs. Africa was a mixed martial arts event held by UAE Warriors on June 12, 2025, in Abu Dhabi, United Arab Emirates.

=== Background ===
A bantamweight bout between Abdul Hussein and Sami Yahia headlined the event.

=== Results ===
Main card (UFC Fight Pass)
Weight class				Method	Round	Time	Notes
Bantamweight	Abdul Hussein	def.	Sami Yahia	TKO (knees and punches)	1	3:44
Middleweight	Diego Bandu	def.	Islem Masraf	TKO (elbows and punches)	2	4:15
Catchweight (159 lb)	Abdulla Al Bousheiri	def.	Cole Henning	Submission (triangle armbar)	1	4:34
Welterweight	Omran Chaaban	def.	Gunther Kalunda Ngunza	Decision (unanimous) (30–27, 30–27, 29–28)	3	5:00
Preliminary card (UFC Fight Pass)
Featherweight	Ilias Bulaid	vs.	Rebin Fazil	No Contest (punches to back of head)	1	0:42	(Note: Accidental punches to back of head rendered Fazil unable to continue.)
Middleweight	Khaled Laallam	def.	Siyaku Dumiso Nomvemve	Decision (unanimous) (29–28, 30–27, 30–27)	3	5:00
Middleweight	Mohamed Eldeeb	def.	Zaman Ismail	Decision (unanimous) (29–28, 29–28, 29–28)	3	5:00
Featherweight	Ananias Mulumba	def.	Amer El Shanshory	Submission (rear-naked choke)	2	1:13
Catchweight (157 lb)	Ahmed Mando	def.	Abood AlQaisi	Submission (armbar)	1	2:13
Catchweight (130 lb)	Flobater Fares	def.	Abdel Hafid Bendari	Decision (unanimous) (30–27, 30–27, 30–27)	3	5:00
Welterweight	Fahad Eltahawy	def.	Elias Farah	TKO (punches)	3	0:19
Women's Bantamweight	Lisa Zimmo	def.	Chaymae Boudik	Submission (rear-naked choke)	1	3:55
Catchweight (139 lb)	Lewis Mataya	def.	Mahmoud Abdel Raouf	KO (elbow and punch)	1	2:20

== UAE Warriors 60 ==
UAE Warriors 60: Nunes vs. Abubakar
- Promotion: UAE Warriors
- Date: June 13, 2025
- Venue: Space42 Arena
- City: Abu Dhabi, United Arab Emirates

UAE Warriors 60: Nunes vs. Abubakar was a mixed martial arts event held by UAE Warriors on June 13, 2025, in Abu Dhabi, United Arab Emirates.

=== Background ===
The event was headlined by an interim UAE Warriors Flyweight Championship bout between Victor Nunes and Muhidin Abubakar.

The co-main event featured a heavyweight bout between UFC veterans Tanner Boser and Vinicius Moreira.

=== Results ===
Main card (UFC Fight Pass)
Weight class				Method	Round	Time	Notes
Flyweight	Muhidin Abubakar	def.	Victor Nunes	Decision (split) (48–47, 47–48, 48–47)	5	5:00	(Note: For the interim UAE Warriors Flyweight Championship.)
Heavyweight	Tanner Boser	def.	Vinicius Moreira	TKO (retirement)	3	1:55
Catchweight (163 lb)	Vladyslav Rudnev	def.	Piotr Niedzielski	Decision (unanimous) (29–28, 29–28, 29–28)	3	5:00
Catchweight (163 lb)	Martun Mezhlumyan	def.	Italo Gomes	Submission (rear-naked choke)	3	2:27
Bantamweight	Gamlet Aslanov	def.	Shikhikhlas Dzhamalov	Decision (unanimous) (29–28, 29–28, 30–27)	3	5:00
Catchweight (163 lb)	Mohammad Hossein Khorsandi	def.	Yazeed Hasanain	Decision (unanimous) (30–27, 30–27, 30–27)	3	5:00
Preliminary card (UFC Fight Pass)
Middleweight	Romero Cotton	def.	Marcos Santana dos Santos	TKO (retirement)	3	1:30
Light Heavyweight	Magomed Tuchalov	def.	Tursunbek Sodikov	Submission (rear-naked choke)	1	2:36
Women's Strawweight	Michele dos Santos Oliveira	def.	Zulfiya Kurbashova	TKO (punches)	1	1:18
Middleweight	Rafik-Bek Omarov	def.	Feng Senwei	KO (punch to the body)	3	1:35
Bantamweight	Sukhrobbek Atazhanov	def.	Murad Ibragimov	Technical Submission (guillotine choke)	2	2:22
Bantamweight	Ruel Pañales	def.	Faris Asha Eldawimah	Decision (unanimous) (30–27, 30–27, 30–27)	3	5:00

== UAE Warriors 61 ==
UAE Warriors 61: AlQaisi vs. Chipfumbu
- Promotion: UAE Warriors
- Date: July 23, 2025
- Venue: Space42 Arena
- City: Abu Dhabi, United Arab Emirates

UAE Warriors 61: AlQaisi vs. Chipfumbu was a mixed martial arts event held by UAE Warriors on July 23, 2025, in Abu Dhabi, United Arab Emirates.

=== Background ===
The event was headlined by an inaugural UAE Warriors Intercontinental Featherweight Championship bout between former two-time UAE Warriors Featherweight Champion Ali AlQaisi and Sylvester Chipfumbu.

=== Results ===
Main card (UFC Fight Pass)
Weight class				Method	Round	Time	Notes
Featherweight	Sylvester Chipfumbu	def.	Ali AlQaisi	Decision (unanimous) (30–27, 29–28, 29–28)	3	5:00	(Note: For the inaugural UAE Warriors Intercontinental Featherweight Championship.)
Bantamweight	Asaf Chopurov	def.	João Pedro Saldanha	TKO (submission to punches)	1	2:49
Welterweight	Omran Chaaban	def.	Wellington Madeira	TKO (leg kicks)	1	0:46
Catchweight (174 lb)	Evgeny Morozov	def.	Evgeny Tabarovsky	TKO (elbows)	1	4:41
Heavyweight	Kazbek Saidaliev	def.	Ronny Markes	KO (knee)	2	0:22
Preliminary card (UFC Fight Pass)
Catchweight (132 lb)	Magomed Idrisov	def.	Daniel Leyva Villagra	TKO (elbow and punches)	1	3:01
Catchweight (139 lb)	Demarte Pena	def.	Abay Zhalal	Decision (unanimous) (29–28, 29–28, 29–28)	3	5:00
Light Heavyweight	Caio Machado	def.	Kevin Oumar	TKO (body kick and flying knee)	1	1:48
Women's Strawweight	Kanako Murata	def.	Ediana Andrade da Silva	Decision (unanimous) (29–27, 29–27, 29–27)	3	5:00
Middleweight	Sharapudin Ziyaudinov	def.	Amir Saeedkia	Decision (unanimous) (30–27, 30–27, 30–27)	3	5:00
Catchweight (152 lb)	Ilias Bulaid	def.	Eduard Demenko	Technical Submission (anaconda choke)	1	3:09
Lightweight	Gamid Khizriev	def.	Asliddin Eshankulov	Submission (triangle choke)	3	1:06
Catchweight (132 lb)	Abdurakhman Nasrutdinov	def.	Imram Magaramov	KO (punch to the body)	1	4:02

== UAE Warriors 62 ==
UAE Warriors 62: Boynazarov vs. Llontop
- Promotion: UAE Warriors
- Date: July 24, 2025
- Venue: Space42 Arena
- City: Abu Dhabi, United Arab Emirates

UAE Warriors 62: Boynazarov vs. Llontop was a mixed martial arts event held by UAE Warriors on July 24, 2025, in Abu Dhabi, United Arab Emirates.

=== Background ===
A UAE Warriors Welterweight Championship bout between current champion Khotam Boynazarov and UFC veteran James Llontop headlined the event.

=== Results ===
Main card (UFC Fight Pass)
Weight class				Method	Round	Time	Notes
Welterweight	Khotam Boynazarov (c)	def.	James Llontop	Decision (unanimous) (50–45, 50–45, 50–45)	5	5:00	(Note: For the UAE Warriors Welterweight Championship.)
Catchweight (158 lb)	Bruno Machado Azeredo	def.	Agshin Babaev	TKO (punches)	1	1:36
Catchweight (165 lb)	Magomed Kabardiev	def.	Kiril Gorobets	Decision (unanimous) (29–28, 29–28, 30–27)	3	5:00
Catchweight (190 lb)	Anvarbek Daniyalbekov	def.	Imam-Shapi Mukhtarov	Decision (unanimous) (30–27, 30–27, 30–27)	3	5:00
Preliminary card (UFC Fight Pass)
Lightweight	Felipe Douglas	def.	Zhasulan Akimzhanov	Decision (unanimous) (29–28, 29–28, 29–28)	3	5:00
Flyweight	Yamato Fujita	def.	Maysara Mohamed	Submission (rear-naked choke)	2	4:18
Bantamweight	Mehemmedeli Osmanli	def.	Faeez Jacobs	Decision (unanimous) (30–27, 30–27, 30–27)	3	5:00
Welterweight	Amir Hossein Alipour	def.	Abdelkrim Zouad	KO (punch)	1	1:01
Women's Flyweight	Shanna Young	def.	Amena Hadaya	Decision (unanimous) (30–27, 30–27, 30–27)	3	5:00
Bantamweight	Ullubiy Amirzhanov	def.	Ravshan Boymirzoev	KO (body kick)	1	1:03
Featherweight	Ramazan Ragimov	def.	Eduardo Mora	TKO (submission to punches)	1	2:04
Bantamweight	Marouane Bellagouit	def.	Jayson Margallo	TKO (elbow and punch)	1	4:45

== UAE Warriors 63 ==
UAE Warriors 63: Morozov vs. Saraliev
- Promotion: UAE Warriors
- Date: September 10, 2025
- Venue: Al Ain Convention Centre
- City: Al Ain, United Arab Emirates

UAE Warriors 63: Morozov vs. Saraliev was a mixed martial arts event held by UAE Warriors on September 10, 2025, in Al Ain, United Arab Emirates.

=== Background ===
A catchweight bout of 174 pounds between Evgeny Morozov and Basir Saraliev headlined the event.

=== Results ===
Main card (UFC Fight Pass)
Weight class				Method	Round	Time	Notes
Catchweight (174 lb)	Basir Saraliev	def.	Evgeny Morozov	Decision (unanimous) (29–28, 30–27, 30–27)	3	5:00
Catchweight (159 lb)	Alex da Silva Coelho	def.	Kurbanali Isabekov	KO (punch)	2	4:42
Light Heavyweight	Magomed Saidov	def.	Valmir da Silva	Decision (unanimous) (29–28, 30–27, 30–27)	3	5:00
Catchweight (130 lb)	Zarrukh Adashev	def.	Luke Shanks	Decision (unanimous) (29–28, 30–27, 30–27)	3	5:00
Lightweight	Abdullo Khodzhaev	def.	Turan Ahmadov	TKO (punches)	1	3:59
Catchweight (203 lb)	John-Martin Fraser	def.	Abdul Elwahab Saeed	KO (elbows)	1	2:31
Preliminary card (UFC Fight Pass)
Middleweight	Pedro Oliveira	def.	Ali Foladi	Submission (rear-naked choke)	2	3:45
Lightweight	Slimen Hassaini	def.	Mirmehti Miriyev	Decision (unanimous) (30–27, 30–27, 29–28)	3	5:00
Light Heavyweight	Magomed Tuchalov	def.	Khabib Gaziev	KO (flying knee)	2	3:46
Women's Flyweight	Sarah Mahmood	def.	Ilknur Kurt	Decision (unanimous) (29–28, 29–28, 29–28)	3	5:00
Bantamweight	Flobater Fares	def.	Alex Asio Jr.	TKO (knee to the body and punches)	1	2:13
Light Heavyweight	Nutsalkhan Magomedov	def.	Ion Chirilov	Submission (arm-triangle choke)	1	1:32

== UAE Warriors 64 ==
UAE Warriors 64
- Promotion: UAE Warriors
- Date: October 22, 2025
- Venue: ADNEC Centre
- City: Abu Dhabi, United Arab Emirates

UAE Warriors 64 was a mixed martial arts event held by UAE Warriors on October 22, 2025, in Abu Dhabi, United Arab Emirates.

=== Results ===
Main card (UFC Fight Pass)
Weight class				Method	Round	Time	Notes
Flyweight	Muhidin Abubakar (ic)	def.	Iago Ribeiro (c)	Decision (unanimous) (49–45, 49–46, 50–45)	5	5:00	(Note: For the UAE Warriors Flyweight Championship.)
Bantamweight	Asaf Chopurov	def.	Demarte Pena	TKO (retirement)	3	5:00	(Note: For the vacant UAE Warriors Bantamweight Championship.)
Lightweight	Abdullo Khodzhaev	def.	Felipe Douglas	Decision (unanimous) (30–27, 30–27, 29–28)	3	5:00
Bantamweight	Abdul Hussein	def.	Gift Walker	Submission (rear-naked choke)	1	3:47
Catchweight (198 Ib)	John-Martin Fraser	def.	Imamshafi Aliev	Decision (unanimous) (30–27, 30–27, 29–28)	3	5:00
Bantamweight	Ullubiy Amirzhanov	def.	Rasim Mirzaev	Technical Submission (buggy choke)	1	2:02
Featherweight	Sundet Aytkul	def.	Guido Santos	Decision (unanimous) (29–27, 29–27, 29–27)	3	5:00
Welterweight	Amir Hossein Alipour	def.	Mansur Dadaev	TKO (punches and knee)	3	1:54
Catchweight (139 Ib)	Kurban Zaynukov	def.	Taishi Horie	Technical Submission (ninja choke)	3	4:23
Featherweight	Ramazan Ragimov	def.	Marouane Bellagouit	Decision (split) (29–28, 28–29, 29–28)	3	5:00
Catchweight (119 lb)	Amena Hadaya	def.	Samantha Jean-Francois	TKO (punches)	3	0:38
Flyweight	Muhammadkabir Nazarzoda	vs.	Bekhzod Abdurakhimov	No Contest (accidental knee to groin)	1	4:59	(Note: Accidental knee to the groin rendered Nazarzoda unable to continue.)

== UAE Warriors 65 ==
UAE Warriors 65
- Promotion: UAE Warriors
- Date: November 15, 2025
- Venue: ADNEC Centre Al Ain
- City: Al Ain, United Arab Emirates

UAE Warriors 65 was a mixed martial arts event held by UAE Warriors on November 15, 2025, in Al Ain, United Arab Emirates.

=== Results ===
Main card (UFC Fight Pass)
Weight class				Method	Round	Time	Notes
Women's Strawweight	Michele Oliveira	def.	Lany Silva	Decision (Split)	5	5:00	For the vacant UAE Warriors Women's Strawweight Championship.
Catchweight (165 Ib)	Bruno Azeredo	def.	Brentin Mumford	Submission (Arm Triangle Choke)	1	4:52
Catchweight (190 Ib)	Abdurakhman Alimagomedov	def.	Anvarbek Daniyalbekov	Disqualification (Illegal Elbows)	1	4:51
Flyweight	Reece McLaren	def.	Yamato Fujita	Decision (Unanimous)	3	5:00
Bantamweight	Mehemmedeli Osmanli	def.	Bakhtovar Yunusov	Submission (Guilotine Choke)	2	1:57
Welterweight	Basir Saraliev	def.	Shakhban Alkhasov	TKO (Punches)	1	4:24
Welterweight	Shakhban Alkhasov	def.	Marcos Santana	KO (Head Kick)	1	0:53
Featherweight	Ahmed Faress	def.	Walter Cogliandro	Submission (Rear Naked Choke)	3	3:51
Catchweight (161 Ib)	Abdulla Al Bousheiri	def.	Davlatbek Khozhiev	Decision (Unanimous)	3	5:00
Catchweight (192 Ib)	Sharapudin Ziyaudinov	def.	Khaled Laallam	TKO (Neck Injury)	2	5:00
Catchweight (140 Ib)	Pavel Andrusca	def.	Daermisi Zhawupasi	KO (Punch)	1	3:53
Catchweight (130 Ib)	Furkatbek Yokubov	def.	Ruel Pañales	Decision (Unanimous)	3	5:00
Catchweight (209 Ib)	Nutsalkhan Magomedov	def.	Shokhboz Ortikov	TKO (Punches)	1	2:20
Welterweight	Magomed Muradov	def.	Faridun Shokhnazarov	Decision (Split)	3	5:00

== UAE Warriors 66 ==
UAE Warriors 66
- Promotion: UAE Warriors
- Date: December 11, 2025
- Venue: Fouad Chehab Stadium
- City: Jounieh, Lebanon

UAE Warriors 66 was a mixed martial arts event held by UAE Warriors on December 11, 2025, in Jounieh, Lebanon.

=== Results ===
Main card (UFC Fight Pass)
Weight class				Method	Round	Time	Notes
Catchweight (163 lb)	Georges Eid	def.	Moha Jaghdal	Decision (unanimous)	3	5:00
Featherweight	Shadi Kabbani	def.	Ali Tabaja	TKO (Punches)	1	1:20
Catchweight (128 lb)	Flobater Fares	def.	Talha Derdiyok	Decision (unanimous)	3	5:00
Catchweight (163 lb)	Ahmed Darwish	def.	Anthony Zeidan	Decision (unanimous)	3	5:00
Heavyweight	Karar Rahim Ali	def.	Abed Amir Hammoud	TKO (Punches)	1	4:20
Catchweight (174 lb)	Erfan Madadi	def.	Elie Farah	Submission (Guilloutine Choke)	2	3:35
Catchweight (130 lb)	Imad El Azami	def.	Emad Hamdo	Decision (unanimous)	3	5:00
Women's Flyweight	Ilknur Kurt	def.	Yeganeh Boulaghi	KO (Body kick)	3	2:54
Lightweight	Ali Zreik	def.	Fathy Mahmoud	Decision (unanimous)	3	5:00
Bantamweight	Abed Masharki	def.	Magdy Tariq	TKO (Elbows)	1	3:59

== See also ==
- 2025 in UFC
- 2025 in Professional Fighters League
- 2025 in ONE Championship
- 2025 in Absolute Championship Akhmat
- 2025 in Konfrontacja Sztuk Walki
- 2025 in Rizin Fighting Federation
- 2025 in Oktagon MMA
- 2025 in Brave Combat Federation
- 2025 in Legacy Fighting Alliance
- 2025 in Cage Warriors
