= UAE Warriors =

MMA promoter based in Abu Dhabi

- Sport: Mixed martial arts
- Founded: 2012; 14 years ago
- President: Fouad Darwish
- Country: United Arab Emirates
- Headquarters: Abu Dhabi
- Website: www.uaewarriors.com

UAE Warriors is a mixed martial arts league and martial arts promotion in the Middle East based in Abu Dhabi, United Arab Emirates. Established in 2012, UAE Warriors has to date held 57 events across five nations.

== Scheduled events ==
#	Event	Date	Venue	Location

== Past events ==
#	Event Title	Date	Arena	Location
57	UAE Warriors 52: Arabia 14	July 28, 2024	ADNEC Marina	Abu Dhabi, United Arab Emirates
56	UAE Warriors 51	July 27, 2024	ADNEC Marina	Abu Dhabi, United Arab Emirates
55	UAE Warriors 50	May 18, 2024	ADNEC Marina	Abu Dhabi, United Arab Emirates
54	UAE Warriors 49: Arabia vs. Africa	May 17, 2024	ADNEC Marina	Abu Dhabi, United Arab Emirates
53	UAE Warriors 48	March 3, 2024	Expocentro	Balneario Camboriu, Santa Catarina, Brazil
52	UAE Warriors 47: Arabia 13	January 21, 2024	Mubadala Arena	Abu Dhabi, United Arab Emirates
51	UAE Warriors 46	January 20, 2024	Mubadala Arena	Abu Dhabi, United Arab Emirates
50	UAE Warriors 45	October 17, 2023	Al Jazira Sports Club	Abu Dhabi, United Arab Emirates
49	UAE Warriors 44	August 26, 2023	Etihad Arena	Abu Dhabi, United Arab Emirates
48	UAE Warriors 43: Arabia 12	August 25, 2023	Etihad Arena	Abu Dhabi, United Arab Emirates
47	UAE Warriors 42	May 20, 2023	Etihad Arena	Abu Dhabi, United Arab Emirates
46	UAE Warriors 41: Arabia 11	May 19, 2023	Etihad Arena	Abu Dhabi, United Arab Emirates
45	UAE Warriors 40: Arabia 10	March 19, 2023	Etihad Arena	Abu Dhabi, United Arab Emirates
44	UAE Warriors 39	March 18, 2023	Etihad Arena	Abu Dhabi, United Arab Emirates
43	UAE Warriors 38: Africa 5	March 17, 2023	Etihad Arena	Abu Dhabi, United Arab Emirates
42	UAE Warriors 37: Arabia 9	February 26, 2023	Etihad Arena	Abu Dhabi, United Arab Emirates
41	UAE Warriors 36	February 25, 2023	Etihad Arena	Abu Dhabi, United Arab Emirates
40	UAE Warriors 35: Africa 4	February 24, 2023	Etihad Arena	Abu Dhabi, United Arab Emirates
39	UAE Warriors 34	October 20, 2022	Al Jazira Sports Club	Abu Dhabi, United Arab Emirates
38	UAE Warriors 33	September 17, 2022	Etihad Arena	Abu Dhabi, United Arab Emirates
37	UAE Warriors 32: Africa 3	September 16, 2022	Etihad Arena	Abu Dhabi, United Arab Emirates
36	UAE Warriors 31: Arabia 8	July 3, 2022	Etihad Arena	Abu Dhabi, United Arab Emirates
35	UAE Warriors 30	July 2, 2022	Etihad Arena	Abu Dhabi, United Arab Emirates
34	UAE Warriors 29: Arabia 7	March 27, 2022	Etihad Arena	Abu Dhabi, United Arab Emirates
33	UAE Warriors 28	March 26, 2022	Etihad Arena	Abu Dhabi, United Arab Emirates
32	UAE Warriors 27: Africa 2	March 25, 2022	Etihad Arena	Abu Dhabi, United Arab Emirates
31	UAE Warriors 26: Arabia 6	February 26, 2022	Etihad Arena	Abu Dhabi, United Arab Emirates
30	UAE Warriors 25: Africa 1	February 25, 2022	Etihad Arena	Abu Dhabi, United Arab Emirates
29	UAE Warriors 24	October 29, 2021	Jiu-Jitsu Arena	Abu Dhabi, United Arab Emirates
28	UAE Warriors 23: Arabia 5	October 28, 2021	Jiu-Jitsu Arena	Abu Dhabi, United Arab Emirates
27	UAE Warriors 22	September 4, 2021	Jiu-Jitsu Arena	Abu Dhabi, United Arab Emirates
26	UAE Warriors 21: Arabia 4	September 3, 2021	Jiu-Jitsu Arena	Abu Dhabi, United Arab Emirates
25	UAE Warriors 20	June 19, 2021	Jiu-Jitsu Arena	Abu Dhabi, United Arab Emirates
24	UAE Warriors 19: Arabia 3	June 18, 2021	Jiu-Jitsu Arena	Abu Dhabi, United Arab Emirates
23	UAE Warriors 18	March 20, 2021	Jiu-Jitsu Arena	Abu Dhabi, United Arab Emirates
22	UAE Warriors 17: Arabia 2	March 19, 2021	Jiu-Jitsu Arena	Abu Dhabi, United Arab Emirates
21	UAE Warriors 16: Arabia 1	January 22, 2021	Jiu-Jitsu Arena	Abu Dhabi, United Arab Emirates
20	UAE Warriors 15	January 15, 2021	Jiu-Jitsu Arena	Abu Dhabi, United Arab Emirates
19	UAE Warriors 14	November 27, 2020	Jiu-Jitsu Arena	Abu Dhabi, United Arab Emirates
18	UAE Warriors 13	September 25, 2020	The Rotunda at Caesars Palace	Dubai, United Arab Emirates
17	UAE Warriors 12	July 31, 2020	Jiu-Jitsu Arena	Abu Dhabi, United Arab Emirates
16	UAE Warriors 11	June 12, 2020	Jiu-Jitsu Arena	Abu Dhabi, United Arab Emirates
15	UAE Warriors 10	January 31, 2020	Mubadala Arena	Abu Dhabi, United Arab Emirates
14	UAE Warriors 9	November 29, 2019	Mubadala Arena	Abu Dhabi, United Arab Emirates
13	UAE Warriors 8	October 18, 2019	Mubadala Arena	Abu Dhabi, United Arab Emirates
12	UAE Warriors 7	July 5, 2019	Mubadala Arena	Abu Dhabi, United Arab Emirates
11	UAE Warriors 6	May 3, 2019	Mubadala Arena	Abu Dhabi, United Arab Emirates
10	UAE Warriors 5	January 26, 2019	Mubadala Arena	Abu Dhabi, United Arab Emirates
9	Road to Abu Dhabi Warriors: Brazil	November 1, 2016	Ginasio Mauro Pinheiro	São Paulo, Brazil
8	Road to Abu Dhabi Warriors: Malaysia	October 8, 2016	Kuala Lumpur Badminton Stadium	Kuala Lumpur, Malaysia
7	Road to Abu Dhabi Warriors: Bulgaria	September 24, 2016	Arena Sofia	Sofia, Bulgaria
6	Road to Abu Dhabi Warriors: Thailand	August 12, 2016	Asiatique The Riverfront	Bangkok, Thailand
5	Abu Dhabi Warriors 4	May 24, 2016	IPIC Arena	Abu Dhabi, United Arab Emirates
4	Abu Dhabi Warriors 3	October 3, 2015	IPIC Arena	Abu Dhabi, United Arab Emirates
3	Road To Abu Dhabi Warriors: Thailand 2015 Grand Opening	August 22, 2015	Asiatique The Riverfront	Bangkok, Thailand
2	Abu Dhabi Warriors 2	March 26, 2015	FGB Arena	Abu Dhabi, United Arab Emirates
1	Abu Dhabi Warriors 1	November 2, 2012	Abu Dhabi National Exhibition Centre	Abu Dhabi, United Arab Emirates

== Current champions ==
=== International ===
Division	Upper weight limit	Champion	Since	Title Defenses	Sources
Light Heavyweight	205 lb (93 kg)	(Syria) Tarek Suleiman	May 3, 2019 (UAEW 6)	0	
Middleweight	185 lb (84 kg)	(Iran) Amir Fazli	May 20, 2023 (UAEW 42)	0	
Welterweight	170 lb (77 kg)	(Uzbekistan) Khotam Boynazarov	October 22, 2024 (UAEW 55)	0	
Lightweight	155 lb (70 kg)	(Russia) Amru Magomedov	October 17, 2023 (UAEW 45)	1	
Featherweight	145 lb (66 kg)	(Sweden) Samuel Bark	May 18, 2024 (UAEW 50)	0	
Bantamweight	135 lb (61 kg)	(Azerbaijan) Asaf Chopurov			
Flyweight	125 lb (57 kg)	(Brazil) Iago Ribeiro	May 18, 2024 (UAEW 50)	0	
Women's Flyweight	125 lb (57 kg)	(Canada) Corinne Laframboise	March 26, 2022 (UAEW 28)	0	

=== Arabia ===
Division	Upper weight limit	Champion	Since	Title Defenses	Sources
Middleweight	185 lb (84 kg)	(Egypt) Eslam Abdul-Basit	July 3, 2022 (UAEW 31)	0	
Welterweight	170 lb (77 kg)	(Finland) (Lebanon) Omran Chaaban	January 21, 2024 (UAEW 47)	0	
Lightweight	155 lb (70 kg)	Vacant			
Featherweight	145 lb (66 kg)	(Jordan) Ali al-Qaisi	March 27, 2022 (UAEW 29)	1	
Bantamweight	135 lb (61 kg)	(Canada) (Morocco) Xavier Alaoui	July 3, 2022 (UAEW 31)	0	
Flyweight	125 lb (57 kg)	(Jordan) Nawras Abzakh	July 3, 2022 (UAEW 31)	1	

=== Africa ===
Division	Upper weight limit	Champion	Since	Title Defenses	Sources
Light Heavyweight	205 lb (93 kg)	(Germany) (Angola) Emilio Quissua	September 16, 2022 (UAEW 32)	0	
Welterweight	170 lb (77 kg)	(Italy) (Tunisia) Wisem Hammami	March 25, 2022 (UAEW 27)	0	
Featherweight	145 lb (66 kg)	(Cameroon) Jaures Dea	February 24, 2023 (UAEW 35)	0	

== International Championship history ==
=== Heavyweight Championship ===
Weight limit: 265 lb (120.2 kg)

No.	Name	Event	Date	Defenses
1	(United Kingdom) Chi Lewis-Parry def. Mahmoud Hassan	UAE Warriors 7 Abu Dhabi, UAE	July 5, 2019	1. def. Fabio Maldonado at UAE Warriors 13 on Sep 25, 2020

=== Light Heavyweight Championship ===
Weight limit: 205 lb (93.0 kg)

No.	Name	Event	Date	Defenses
1	(Syria) Tarek Suleiman def. Oli Thompson	UAE Warriors 6 Abu Dhabi, UAE	May 3, 2019	
Suleiman vacated the title to sign with Brave CF.
2	(Russia) Magomed Tuchalov def. Caio Machado	UAE Warriors 69; Al-Ain, UAE	March 28, 2026	

=== Middleweight Championship ===
Weight limit: 185 lb (83.9 kg)

No.	Name	Event	Date	Defenses
1	(Republic of Ireland) Will Fleury def. Tarek Suleiman	UAE Warriors 28: International; Abu Dhabi, UAE	March 26, 2022	
Fleury vacated the title to compete for the PFL.
2	(Iran) Amir Fazli def. Juscelino Ferreira	UAE Warriors 42; Abu Dhabi, UAE	May 20, 2023	

=== Welterweight Championship ===
Weight limit: 170 lb (77.1 kg)

No.	Name	Event	Date	Defenses
1	(France) Amin Ayoub def. Ahmad Labban	UAE Warriors 6 Abu Dhabi, UAE	May 3, 2019	1. def. Yousef Wehbe at UAE Warriors 7 on Jul 5, 2019
Ayoub vacated the title to compete for Brave CF.
2	(Lebanon) Josh Togo def. Tahir Abdullaev	UAE Warriors 33; Abu Dhabi, UAE	September 17, 2022	
Togo vacated the title to compete for the PFL.
3	(Azerbaijan) Tahir Abdullaev def. Shakhban Alkhasov	UAE Warriors 50; Abu Dhabi, UAE	May 18, 2024	
4	(Uzbekistan) Khotam Boynazarov	UAE Warriors 55; Abu Dhabi, UAE	October 22, 2024	1. def. James Llontop at UAE Warriors 62 on July 24, 2025

=== Lightweight Championship ===
Weight limit: 155 lb (70.3 kg)

No.	Name	Event	Date	Defenses
1	(Brazil) Bruno Azeredo def. Mike Santiago	UAE Warriors 12; Abu Dhabi, UAE	July 31, 2020	1. def. Jung Yun-jae at UAE Warriors 36 on Feb 25, 2023
Azeredo vacated the title.
2	(Russia) Amru Magomedov def. Jakhongir Jumaev	UAE Warriors 45; Abu Dhabi, UAE	October 17, 2023	1. def. Ali Kabdulla at UAE Warriors 51 on July 27, 2024; 2. def. Alex da Silva at UAE Warriors 58 on February 22, 2025
Magomedov vacated the title when he signed with the Professional Fighters League.
3	(Ukraine) Vladislav Rudnev def. Martun Mezhlumyan	UAE Warriors 71; Abu Dhabi, UAE	May 9, 2026	

=== Featherweight Championship ===
Weight limit: 145 lb (65.8 kg)

No.	Name	Event	Date	Defenses
1	(Philippines) Rolando Dy def. Erzhan Estanov	UAE Warriors 6 Abu Dhabi, UAE	May 3, 2019	
2	(South Korea) Do Gyeom Lee	UAE Warriors 8 Abu Dhabi, UAE	October 18, 2019	1. def. Alexandru Chitoran at UAE Warriors 12 on Jul 31, 2020
3	(Jordan) Ali AlQaisi	UAE Warriors 24; Abu Dhabi, UAE	October 29, 2021	
4	(Canada) Jesse Arnett	UAE Warriors 30; Abu Dhabi, UAE	July 2, 2022	
5	(Jordan) Ali AlQaisi (2)	UAE Warriors 33; Abu Dhabi, UAE	September 17, 2022	1. def. Jesse Arnett at UAE Warriors 42 on May 20, 2023
6	(Sweden) Samuel Bark	UAE Warriors 50; Abu Dhabi, UAE	May 18, 2024	

=== Bantamweight Championship ===
Weight limit: 135 lb (61.2 kg)

No.	Name	Event	Date	Defenses
1	(Canada) Xavier Alaoui def. Jaures Dea	UAE Warriors 14; Abu Dhabi, UAE	November 27, 2020	
2	(Brazil) Vinicius Oliveira	UAE Warriors 18; Abu Dhabi, UAE	March 20, 2021	1. def. Sylvester Chipfumbu at UAE Warriors 24 on October 29, 2021
3	(Sweden) Ali Taleb	UAE Warriors 30; Abu Dhabi, UAE	July 2, 2022	
Taleb vacated the title in August 2022 when he signed with the PFL.
4	(Azerbaijan) Asaf Chopurov def. Demarte Pena	UAE Warriors 64; Abu Dhabi, UAE	October 22, 2025	1. def. Adriano Ramos at UAE Warriors 69 on March 28, 2026; 2. def. Reece McLaren at UAE Warriors 72 on July 23, 2026

=== Flyweight Championship ===
Weight limit: 125 lb (56.7 kg)

No.	Name	Event	Date	Defenses
1	(Brazil) Iago Ribeiro def. Yamato Fujita	UAE Warriors 50; Abu Dhabi, UAE	May 18, 2024	
-	(England) Muhudin Abubakar def. Victor Nunes for interim title	UAE Warriors 60; Abu Dhabi, UAE	June 13, 2025	
2	(England) Muhudin Abubakar	UAE Warriors 64; Abu Dhabi, UAE	October 22, 2025	

=== Women's Flyweight Championship ===
Weight limit: 125 lb (56.7 kg)

No.	Name	Event	Date	Defenses
1	(France) Manon Fiorot def. Gabriela Campo	UAE Warriors 14; Abu Dhabi, UAE	November 27, 2020	
Fiorot vacated the title to compete for the UFC.
2	(Canada) Corinne Laframboise def. Carolina Jimenez	UAE Warriors 28: International; Abu Dhabi, UAE	March 26, 2022	

=== Women's Strawweight Championship ===
Weight limit: 115 lb (52.2 kg)

No.	Name	Event	Date	Defenses
1	(Australia) Jacinta Austin def. Valentina Escobar	UAE Warriors 55; Abu Dhabi, UAE	October 22, 2024	
Austin vacated the title when she signed with the PFL.
2	(Brazil) Michele Oliveira def. Lany Silva	UAE Warriors 65; Al Ain, UAE	November 15, 2025	
3	(Kyrgyzstan) Farida Abdueva	UAE Warriors 74; Abu-Dhabi, UAE	October 22, 2026	

== Arabia Championship history ==
=== Arabia Middleweight Championship ===
Weight limit: 185 lb (83.9 kg)

No.	Name	Event	Date	Defenses
1	(Egypt) Eslam Abdul Baset def. Laid Zerhouni	UAE Warriors 31: Arabia 8 Abu Dhabi, UAE	July 3, 2022	

=== Arabia Welterweight Championship ===
Weight limit: 170 lb (77.1 kg)

No.	Name	Event	Date	Defenses
1	(Morocco) Badreddine Diani def. Abdulla Al Bousheiri	UAE Warriors 21: Arabia 4 Abu Dhabi, UAE	September 3, 2021	1. def. Abdulla Al Bousheiri at UAE Warriors 40: Arabia 10 on Mar 19, 2023
2	(Italy) Wisem Hammamai	UAE Warriors 43: Arabia 12; Abu Dhabi, UAE	August 25, 2023	
3	(Finland) Omran Chaaban	UAE Warriors 47: Arabia 13; Abu Dhabi, UAE	January 21, 2024	

=== Arabia Lightweight Championship ===
Weight limit: 155 lb (70.3 kg)

No.	Name	Event	Date	Defenses
1	(United Arab Emirates) Mohammad Yahya def. Yazid Chouchane	UAE Warriors 21: Arabia 4 Abu Dhabi, UAE	September 3, 2021	1. def. Moha Jaghdal at UAE Warriors 29: Arabia 7 on Mar 27, 2022; 2. def. Jonny Touma at UAE Warriors 37: Arabia 9 on Feb 26, 2023

=== Arabia Featherweight Championship ===
Weight limit: 145 lb (65.8 kg)

No.	Name	Event	Date	Defenses
1	(Jordan) Ali AlQaisi def. Ahmed Faress	UAE Warriors 29: Arabia 7 Abu Dhabi, UAE	March 27, 2022	1. def. Ahmed Faress at UAE Warriors 40: Arabia 10 on Mar 19, 2023

=== Arabia Bantamweight Championship ===
Weight limit: 135 lb (61.2 kg)

No.	Name	Event	Date	Defenses
1	(Canada) Xavier Alaoui def. Fabricio Sarraff	UAE Warriors 31: Arabia 8 Abu Dhabi, UAE	July 3, 2022	1. def. Rany Saadeh at UAE Warriors 68 on Mar 27, 2026

=== Arabia Flyweight Championship ===
Weight limit: 125 lb (56.7 kg)

No.	Name	Event	Date	Defenses
1	(Jordan) Nawras Abzakh def. Sami Yahia	UAE Warriors 31: Arabia 8 Abu Dhabi, UAE	July 3, 2022	1. def. Jonny Touma at UAE Warriors 37: Arabia 9 on Feb 26, 2023

== Africa Championship history ==
=== Africa Light Heavyweight Championship ===
Weight limit: 205 lb (93.0 kg)

No.	Name	Event	Date	Defenses
1	(Germany) Emilio Quissua def. Kevin Oumar	UAE Warriors 32: Africa 3 Abu Dhabi, UAE	September 16, 2022	

=== Africa Welterweight Championship ===
Weight limit: 170 lb (77.1 kg)

No.	Name	Event	Date	Defenses
1	(Italy) Wisem Hammami def. Badreddine Diani	UAE Warriors 35: Africa 4 Abu Dhabi, UAE	March 25, 2022	

=== Africa Featherweight Championship ===
Weight limit: 145 lb (65.8 kg)

No.	Name	Event	Date	Defenses
1	(Cameroon) Jaures Dea def. Mohamed Camara	UAE Warriors 27: Africa 2 Abu Dhabi, UAE	February 24, 2023	

== Intercontinental Championship history ==
=== Intercontinental Featherweight Championship ===
Weight limit: 145 lb (65.8 kg)

No.	Name	Event	Date	Defenses
1	(Zimbabwe) Sylvester Chipfumbu def. Ali AlQaisi	UAE Warriors 61; Abu Dhabi, UAE	July 23, 2025	

== Notable fighters ==
- (France) Karl Amoussou
- (Russia) Gadzhimurad Antigulov
- (United States) Austin Arnett
- (United States) Chris Barnett
- (Netherlands) Yousri Belgaroui
- (France) Lucie Bertaud
- (United States) Ray Borg
- (Netherlands) Ilias Bulaid
- (United States) Shawn Bunch
- (Denmark) Joachim Christensen
- (Brazil) Alex da Silva Coelho
- (China) Wang Cong
- (Netherlands) Reinier de Ridder
- (England) Dakota Ditcheva
- (Philippines) Rolando Dy
- (Russia) Rinat Fakhretdinov
- (Portugal) André Fialho
- (France) Manon Fiorot
- (Russia) Movlid Khaybulaev
- (Russia) Azamat Kerefov
- (United States) Mike Kyle
- (Israel) Noad Lahat
- (Philippines) Jenel Lausa
- (Tunisia) Mounir Lazzez
- (France) Mickaël Lebout
- (Sweden) Josefine Lindgren Knutsson
- (Russia) Magomed Magomedkerimov
- (Brazil) Fábio Maldonado
- (Greece) Andreas Michailidis
- (Russia) Mikhail Mokhnatkin
- (Russia) Usman Nurmagomedov
- (Scotland) Casey O'Neill
- (Canada) Jesse Ronson
- (France) Dylan Salvador
- (Russia) Alexander Sarnavskiy
- (Turkey) Sabriye Şengül
- (United States) Sean Soriano
- (Cameroon) Sokoudjou
- (United States) Eric Spicely
- (Armenia) Akop Stepanyan
- (England) Oli Thompson
- (India) Jeet Toshi
- (France) Jimmy Vienot
- (England) Jim Wallhead
- (Japan) Kazunori Yokota
- (Russia) Shamil Zavurov
- (Russia) Mikhail Zayats
- (Russia) Magomed Zaynukov
- (China) Rong Zhu

== See also ==
- Ultimate Fighting Championship
- Bellator MMA
