= Sabriye Şengül =

Turkish boxer, kickboxer, and mixed martial arts fighter

- Born: 12 November 1988 (age 37); Şalpazarı, Trabzon, Turkey
- Nationality: Turkish
- Height: 1.65 m (5 ft 5 in)
- Weight: 57.0 kg (125.7 lb; 8.98 st)
- Division: Flyweight
- Reach: 64 in (163 cm)
- Style: Boxing, Kickboxing, MMA
- Fighting out of: Trabzon, Turkey

Mixed martial arts record
- Total: 9
- Wins: 4
- By knockout: 2
- By submission: 1
- By decision: 1
- Losses: 5
- By knockout: 1
- By submission: 2
- By decision: 2
- Last updated on: 19 June 2022

Sabriye Şengül (born 12 November 1988) is a Turkish female professional boxer and world champion kickboxer. She also competes in mixed martial arts events.

== Martial Arts career ==
Sabriye Şengül was born in Trabzon, northern Turkey on 12 November 1988. Her sports career began with playing handball. Upon her coach's advice, she switched over to boxing in 2006. She won three Turkish Boxing Championship titles.

In 2016, she became world champion in 57 kg kickboxing winning over Belgian Vanessa de Waelle by points at the WKU World Title Fight in Kickboxing with Knie held in Istanbul, Turkey. She won the world champion title for the second time defeating Austrian Christin Fedller at the ISKA Vendetta Professional World Kickboxing Championships in Vienna, Austria in 2018.

By April 2017, she signed for the flyweight division of the mixed martial arts event Bellator MMA. At her first fight for Bellator London 2 in November 2019, she lost to Dutch Denise Kielholtz by Americana submission in 32 seconds in the first round.

Şengül participated at Survivor Turkey's 2019 season.

By June 2021, she fought in a MMA game against French Mona Ftouhi in Dubai, UAE, and won by points decision.

Şengül faced Keri Taylor-Melendez on November 17, 2023 at Bellator 301. At weigh ins, Keri Taylor-Melendez weighed in at 126.6 pounds, .6 pounds over the flyweight limit. The bout proceeded at catchweight and Taylor-Melendez was fined a percentage of her purse which went to Sengül. She lost the bout via guillotine choke in the second round.

== Mixed martial arts record ==
Professional record breakdown
10 matches	4 wins	6 losses
By knockout	2	2
By submission	1	2
By decision	1	2

Res.	Record	Opponent	Method	Event	Date	Round	Time	Location	Notes
Loss	4–6	Jaqueline Ferreira	TKO (punches)	Vendetta Fight Nights 51	May 9, 2026	1	2:57	Ankara, Turkey	Catchweight (132 lb) bout.
Win	4–5	Beata Juhasz	TKO (punches)	Vendetta Fight Nights 49	January 24, 2026	2	3:38	Ankara, Turkey	Bantamweight debut.
Loss	3–5	Ceileigh Niedermayr	Decision (unanimous)	UAE Warriors 49	May 17, 2024	3	5:00	Abu Dhabi, United Arab Emirates	Catchweight (130 lb) bout. Şengül was deducted one point in round 3 due to put your hand to back of the head.
Loss	3–4	Keri Taylor-Melendez	Submission (guillotine choke)	Bellator 301	November 17, 2023	2	2:06	Chicago, Illinois, United States	Catchweight (126.6 lb) bout; Taylor-Melendez missed weight.
Win	3–3	Mena Mohamed Abdallah	TKO (punches)	UAE Warriors 40	March 19, 2023	1	3:58	Abu Dhabi, United Arab Emirates	
Loss	2–3	Hassna Gaber	Decision (unanimous)	UAE Warriors 29	March 27, 2022	3	5:00	Abu Dhabi, United Arab Emirates	
Loss	2–2	Antonia Prifti	TKO (head kick and punches)	Vendetta 24	January 29, 2022	2	0:18	Istanbul, Turkey	
Win	2–1	Martina Gemrani	Submission	Vendetta 21	July 3, 2021	1	3:10	Istanbul, Turkey	
Win	1–1	Mona Ftouhi	Decision (unanimous)	UAE Warriors 19	June 18, 2021	3	5:00	Abu Dhabi, United Arab Emirates	
Loss	0–1	Denise Kielholtz	Submission (keylock)	Bellator London 2	November 23, 2019	1	0:32	London, England	Flyweight debut.
