= Xaxim =

Coordinates: 26.9617°S 52.5347°W

- Municipality
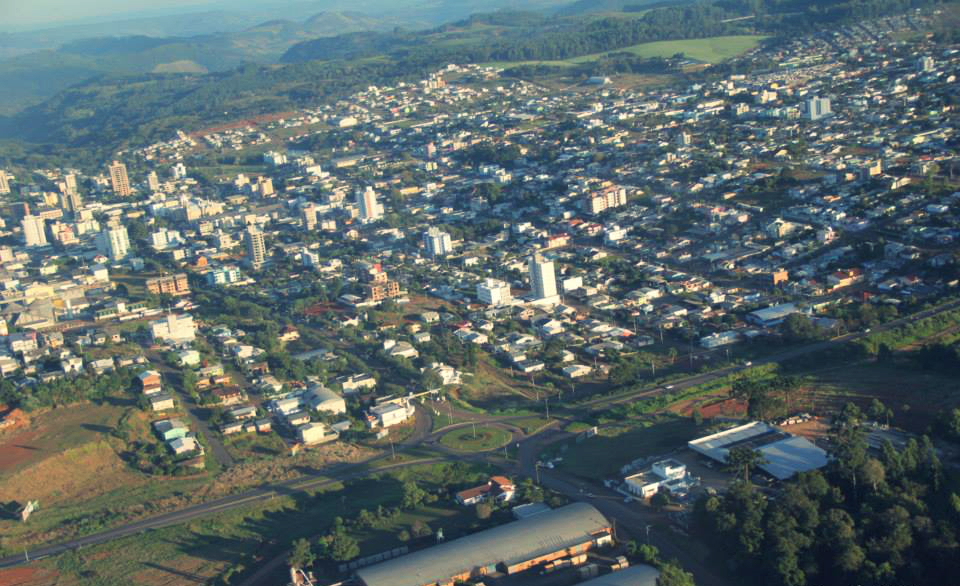

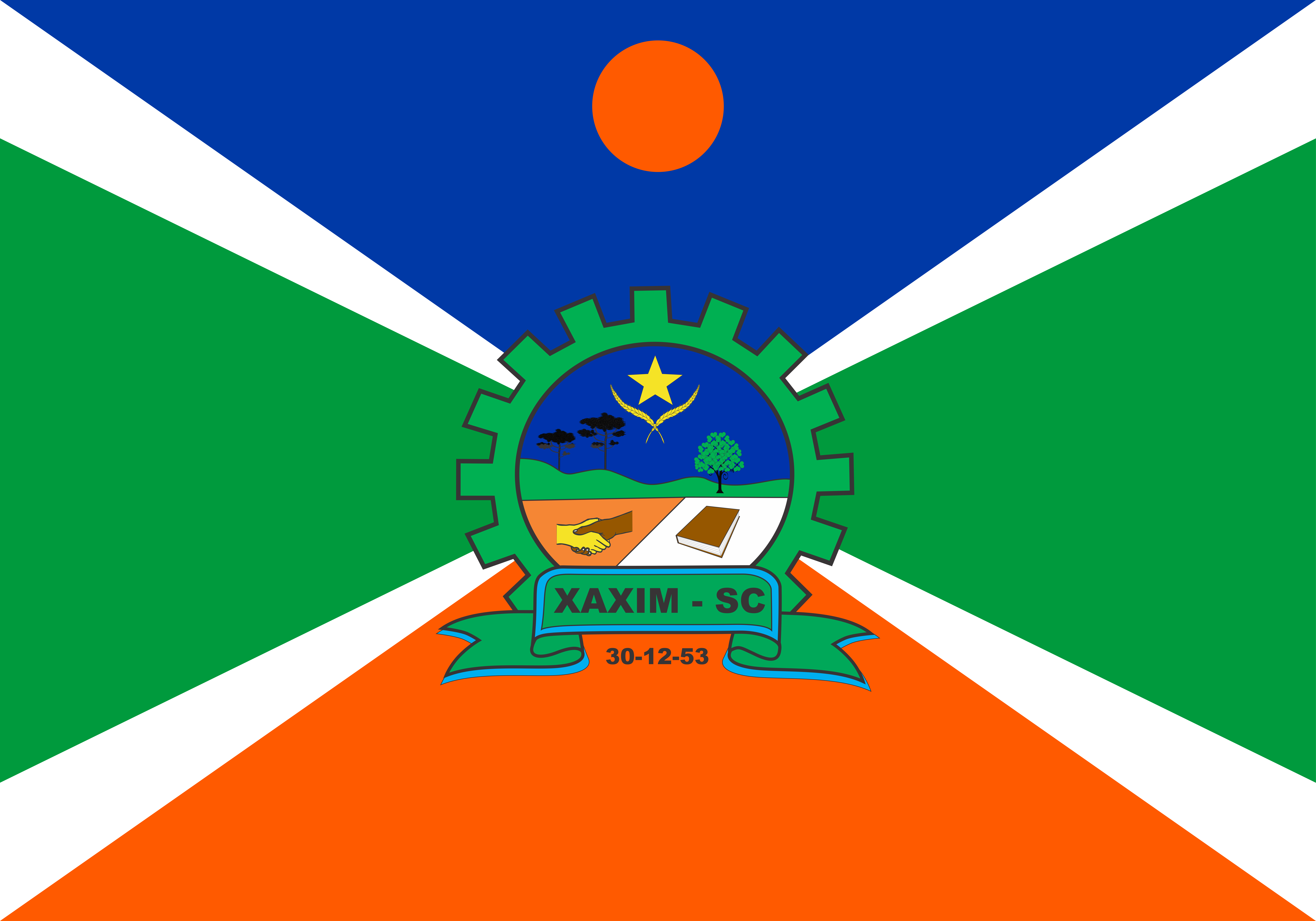
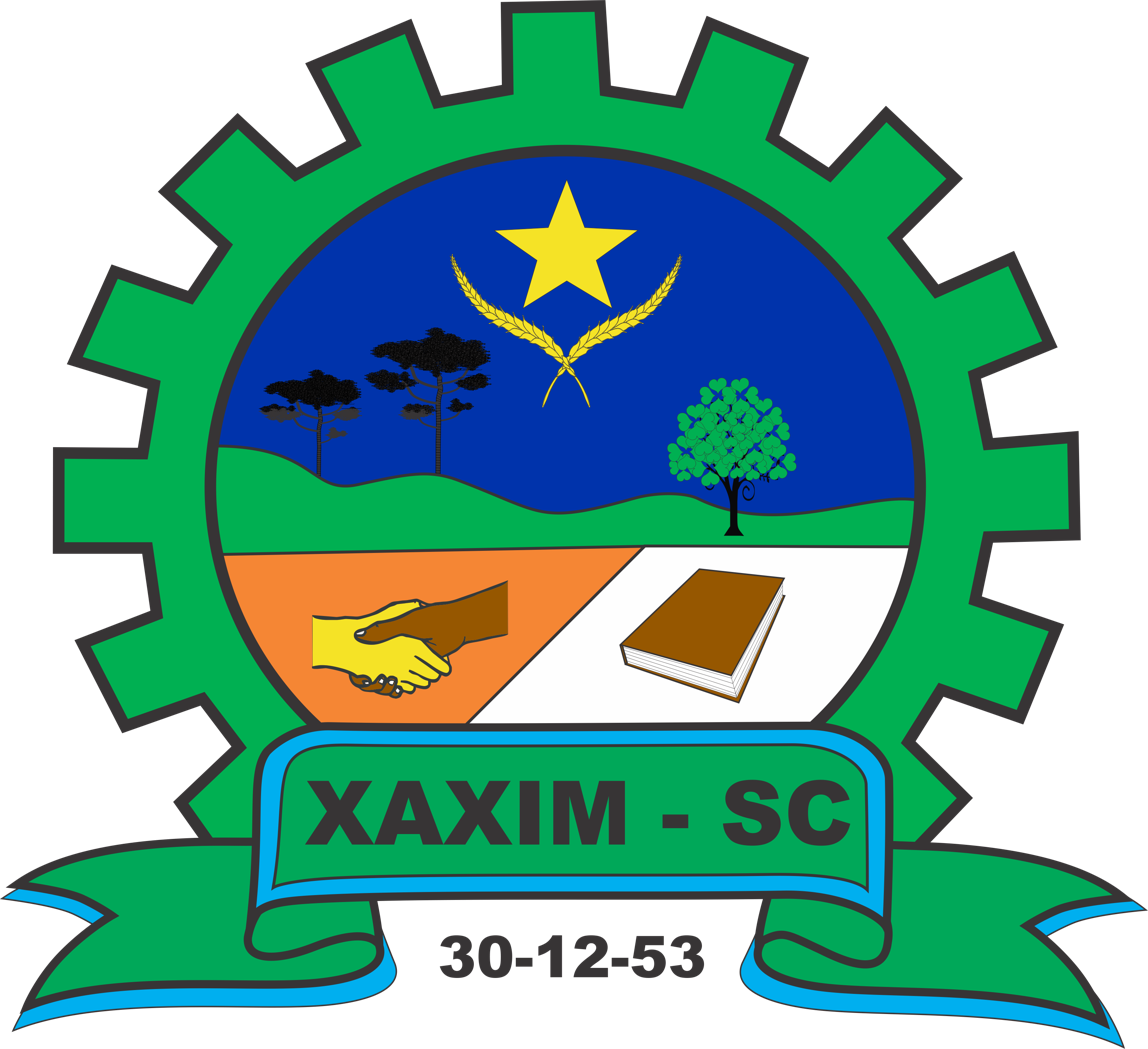
- Flag Coat of arms

- Country: Brazil
- Region: South
- State: Santa Catarina
- Mesoregion: Oeste Catarinense
- Established: 20 February 1954
- Elevation: 2,530 ft (770 m)

Population (2020)
  - Total: 28,983
- Time zone: UTC -3
- Website: www.xaxim.sc.gov.br

Xaxim is a municipality in the state of Santa Catarina in Brazil. Located at latitude 26º57'42" south and longitude 52º32'05" West, with an altitude of 770 meters. Its estimated population in 2020 was of 28,983 inhabitants.

== Name origin ==
Over time, many names preceded this toponym: Chachi (demographic occupation was the kaigangs Indians who lived on the extraction plant), Bands of Xaxim, pitch Xaxim, Xaxim Pouso (the occupation era of mestizos who lived tropeirismo, extraction, agriculture and livestock for subsistence).

However, the origin of the name Xaxim has several hypotheses. As before being colonized the region that now forms the municipality was drovers landing that came from the Palmas fields and heading for Passo Fundo and Nonoai, the drovers called "bands xaxim" common noun tree of this name, which existed in large numbers in the region. Others say that the word Xaxim comes from the Tupi-Guarani language. Near the landing site of the drovers had a small waterfall. Shah = small, Xim = waterfall. Gathering, was Xaxim.

There is also a version of an old Kaigang, to come by, faced with the end of the salt we had. So he said in his language the Indians who accompanied him, "Shah xi", which means little, small, thus giving the name Xaxim. Another version is the one that tells of the black African called Josezinho Xaxim. This place, in his honor, would have won the Xaxim name.

== See also ==
- List of municipalities in Santa Catarina
