= Dylan Salvador =

French mixed martial artist

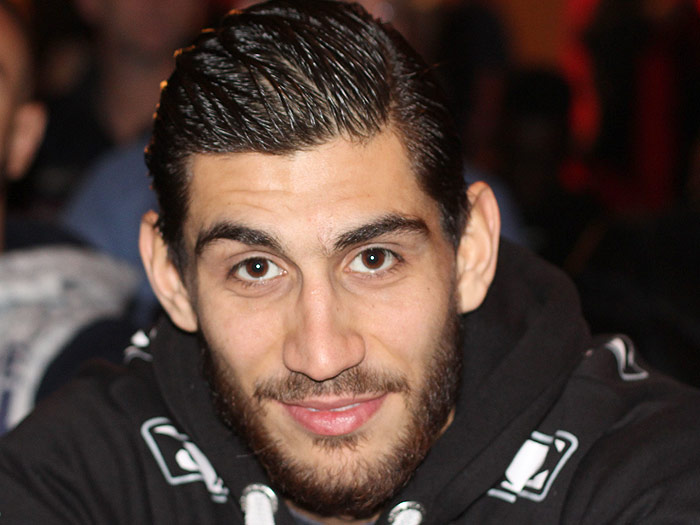
- Born: May 20, 1993 (age 33); Lyon, France
- Height: 176 cm (5 ft 9 in)
- Weight: 67.0 kg (147.7 lb; 10.55 st)
- Division: Lightweight, Featherweight
- Style: Muay Thai, Kickboxing
- Fighting out of: Lyon, France; Atlanta, United States
- Team: Nasser-K (Muay Thai & Kickboxing); Gwinnett Training Academy - ATT Team Lima (MMA)
- Rank: Brown belt in Brazilian Jiu-Jitsu under Amir Dadovic, Roan Carneiro

Kickboxing record
- Total: 73
- Wins: 53
- By knockout: 22
- Losses: 17
- Draws: 3

Mixed martial arts record
- Total: 8
- Wins: 6
- By knockout: 1
- By submission: 5
- Losses: 2
- By knockout: 1
- By decision: 1

Other information
- Mixed martial arts record from Sherdog

Dylan Salvador (born 20 May 1993) is a French mixed martial artist and former Muay Thai kickboxer. A professional competitor since 2011, Salvador is a former two-weight WAKO World champion, having held the low-kick titles at light welterweight and welterweight, and is the 2016 Glory Lightweight Contender Tournament Winner.

As of 25 April 2017, he was the #9 ranked lightweight in the world by LiverKick.com.

== Muay Thai and Kickboxing career ==
Salvador scored a major victory when he defeated Kaew Fairtex by unanimous decision on March 2, 2013, at Warriors Night.

On October 6, 2013, Salvador took part in the MAX Muay Thai qualification tournament in Sendai, Japan. In semifinals he defeated Yuya Yamato by decision before losing by decision to Jingreedtong Seatransferry in the final. Salvador was nonetheless invited to the Max Muaythai Final Chapter Tournament on December 10, 2013. He lost to Victor Nagbe by decision in semifinals.

On June 14, 2014, Salvador faced Ekarit Mor KrunthpTonburi for the WMC Super Lightweight world title at Monte Carlo Fighting Masters 2014. He lost the fight by split decision.

=== Kickboxing transition ===
On December 14, 2014, Salvador Sitthichai Sitsongpeenong at Victory 2. He lost the fight by decision. They rematched five months later at Kunlun Fight 24, Salvador won by unanimous decision.

On July 4, 2015, Salvador took part in the K-1 World GP 2015 -70kg Championship Tournament. In quarterfinals he faced Keita Makihira who defeated him by unanimous decision.

Salvador faced kickboxing legend Buakaw Banchamek on September 24, 2016, at Kunlun Fight 53 - Muay Thai 70kg Championship. He lost the tough contested fight by decision.

=== Glory ===
Dylan Salvador won his first two fights against Anatoly Moiseev and Hysni Beqiri at Glory 36 in Oberhausen, Germany during a 4-men Lightweight Contender Tournament.

Salvador will fight Sittichai Sitsongpeenong for the Glory lightweight title on March 25, 2017, in Brussels, Belgium at Glory 39. It will be the third fight between the two.

Salvador next faced Serhiy Adamchuk in a top contender bout at Glory 42: Paris on October 6, 2017. He lost the fight by unanimous decision.

=== Post Glory run ===
Salvador took part in the 2017 Glory of Heroes 65 kg tournament. In the tournament semifinals he beat Giga Chikadze by extension round unanimous decision. He lost to Qiu Jianliang by unanimous decision in the tournament finals.

Salvador challenged Rafi Bohic for his Lumpinee Stadium title on February 27, 2018. he lost by fourth-round KO due to an elbow strike.

Salvador faced Sorin Căliniuc on June 13, 2019, in the semifinals of the Lightweight Tournament at SAS Gym 02. He lost a controversial split decision despite scoring a knockdown.

== Mixed martial arts career ==
=== Early career ===
Salvador made his mixed martial arts debut against Kenny Porter at Titan FC 54 on April 26, 2019. He won the fight by a third-round submission.

Salvador faced John Morehouse at NFC 131 on April 17, 2021. He won the fight by a second-round submission.

Salvador faced Joshua Anderson at XFN 373 on August 15, 2021. He won the fight by a first-round submission.

Salvador faced Ali Zebian at Premier FC 31 on September 18, 2021, in the final of the one-night Tournament of Champions after winning against Estevan Payne and Anthony Spike via unanimous and split decision. He lost the fight against Zebian via split decision.

Salvador faced Arman Ospanov on January 28, 2022, at Eagle FC 44. He won the fight via TKO due to a corner stoppage between the second and third round.

Salvador faced Jakhongir Jumaev on October 20, 2022, at UAE Warriors 34. He won the bout via Von Flue choke in the third round.

Salvador was invited to Dana White's Contender Series 60, where he faced Bolaji Oki on August 29, 2023, getting finished via TKO stoppage in the first round.

Salvador rebounded on January 20, 2024, at UAE Warriors 46, where he submitted Carls John de Tomas in the first round via rear-naked choke.

== Titles and accomplishments ==
- Glory
  - 2016 Glory Lightweight (-70 kg/154.3 lb) Contender Tournament Winner
- World Association of Kickboxing Organizations
  - 2016 WAKO Pro K-1 66.7 kg World Champion
  - 2014 WAKO Pro Muay Thai 63.5 kg World Champion
- World Boxing Council Muay Thai
  - 2025 WBC Muay Thai Super-welterweight World (154 lbs) Champion

== Mixed martial arts record ==
Professional record breakdown
8 matches	6 wins	2 losses
By knockout	1	1
By submission	5	0
By decision	0	1

Res.	Record	Opponent	Method	Event	Date	Round	Time	Location	Notes
Win	6–2	Carls John de Tomas	Submission (rear-naked choke)	UAE Warriors 46	January 20, 2024	1	4:43	Abu Dhabi, United Arab Emirates	
Loss	5–2	Bolaji Oki	TKO (punches)	Dana White's Contender Series 60	August 29, 2023	1	2:46	Las Vegas, Nevada, United States	
Win	5–1	Jakhongir Jumaev	Submission (shoulder choke)	UAE Warriors 34	October 20, 2022	3	2:42	Abu Dhabi, United Arab Emirates	
Win	4–1	Arman Ospanov	TKO (corner stoppage)	Eagle FC 44	January 28, 2022	2	5:00	Miami, Florida, United States	Featherweight bout; Salvador missed weight (149.4 lb).
Loss	3–1	Ali Zebian	Decision (split)	Premier FC 31	September 18, 2021	3	5:00	Springfield, Massachusetts, United States	Premier FC Lightweight Tournament Final. For the vacant Premier FC Lightweight Championship.
Win	3–0	Joshua Anderson	Submission (rear-naked choke)	Xtreme Fight Night 373	August 15, 2021	1	4:50	Tulsa, Oklahoma, United States	
Win	2–0	John Morehouse	Submission (rear-naked choke)	National FC 131	April 17, 2021	2	1:10	Atlanta, Georgia, United States	Lightweight debut; Salvador missed weight (157.2 lb).
Win	1–0	Kenny Porter	Submission (anaconda choke)	Titan FC 54	April 26, 2019	3	1:04	Fort Lauderdale, Florida, United States	Featherweight debut.

=== Mixed martial arts exhibition record ===
Exhibition record breakdown		
2 matches	2 wins	0 losses
By decision	2	0

Res.	Record	Opponent	Method	Event	Date	Round	Time	Location	Notes
Win	3–0	Singhabu Worawut	TKO (punches)	Mixed Fight Championship	May 30, 2024	1		Saint-Priest, France	
Win	2–0	Anthony Spike	Decision (split)	Premier FC 31	18 September 2021	1	5:00	Springfield, Massachusetts, United States	Tournament of Champions Semi Final.
Win	1–0	Estevan Payan	Decision (unanimous)	Premier FC 31	18 September 2021	1	5:00	Springfield, Massachusetts, United States	Tournament of Champions Quarter Final.

== Muay Thai & Kickboxing record ==
Professional Record
53 Wins (22 (T)KO's), 17 Losses, 2 Draw, No Contest
Date	Result	Opponent	Event	Location	Method	Round	Time
2025-12-20	Win	(Thailand) Kongjak Por.Paoin	La Nuit des Challenges 24	Saint-Fons , France	Decision (Unanimous)	5	3:00
Wins the vacant WBC Muaythai Super-welterweight World (154 lbs) title.
2019-07-27	Loss	(China) Liu Yaning	Wu Lin Feng 2019: WLF -67kg World Cup 2019-2020 2nd Group Stage	Zhengzhou, China	TKO (Punches)	2	2:00
2019-06-13	Loss	(Romania) Sorin Căliniuc	SAS Gym 02, Semi Finals	Bucharest, Romania	Decision (split)	3	3:00
2018-12-15	Win	(Thailand) Phetprajak Sor Jor Somsak	La Nuit Des Challenges	France	TKO (Doctor Stoppage/Cut)	2	1:22
2018-11-17	Draw	(Belarus) Pavel Grishanovic	Hearts On Fire	Italy	Draw	3	3:00
2018-02-27	Loss	(France) Rafi Bohic	Lumpinee Stadium - Best Of Siam	Thailand	KO (Elbow)	4	
For the Lumpinee Stadium 147 lbs title.
2017-12-23	Loss	(China) Qiu Jianliang	Glory of Heroes: Jinan - GOH 65 kg Championship Tournament, Finals	Jinan, China	Decision (Unanimous)	3	3:00
For the 2017 GOH Featherweight (-65kg) World Champion.
2017-12-23	Win	(Georgia (country)) Giga Chikadze	Glory of Heroes: Jinan - GOH 65 kg Championship Tournament, Semi-Finals	Jinan, China	Ex. R Decision (Unanimous)	4	3:00
2017-10-28	Win	(Netherlands) Massaro Glunder	Glory 47: Lyon	Lyon, France	Decision (unanimous)	3	3:00
2017-06-10	Loss	(Ukraine) Serhiy Adamchuk	Glory 42: Paris	Paris, France	Decision (unanimous)	3	3:00
2017-03-25	Loss	(Thailand) Sitthichai Sitsongpeenong	Glory 39: Brussels	Brussels, Belgium	TKO (Knee to the Body)	4	2:58
For the Glory Lightweight Championship.
2016-12-10	Win	(Albania) Hysni Beqiri	Glory 36: Oberhausen - Lightweight Contender Tournament, Final	Oberhausen, Germany	Decision (Unanimous)	3	3:00
Wins the Glory Lightweight Contender Tournament.
2016-12-10	Win	(Russia) Anatoly Moiseev	Glory 36: Oberhausen - Lightweight Contender Tournament, Semi Finals	Oberhausen, Germany	Decision (Majority)	3	3:00
2016-10-22	Win	(Thailand) Manaowan Sitsongpeenong	La Nuit Des Challenges 16	Lyon, France	Decision	5	3:00
2016-09-24	Loss	(Thailand) Buakaw Banchamek	Kunlun Fight 53 - Muay Thai 70kg Championship	Beijing, China	Decision	3	3:00
Fight Was For Kunlun Fight Muaythai Middleweight World Championship.
2016-08-04	Win	(Russia) Roman Babaev	Fight Night St. Tropez	France	KO (Left Body Punch)	2	2:30
2016-06-24	Win	(Russia) Aleksei Fedoseev	Monte Carlo Fighting Masters	Monte Carlo, Monaco	TKO (Referee Stoppage/ Low Kicks)	4	1:48
Wins the WAKO Pro 66.7kg World Title.
2016-05-19	Loss	(Thailand) Saensatharn P.K. Saenchai Muaythaigym	Capital Fights	Paris, France	Decision	5	3:00
For the WMC Welterweight World title.
2015-11-14	Win	(France) Philippe Salmon	Nuit des Champions 2015	France	KO (Left Body Knee)	2	1:20
2015-07-04	Loss	(Japan) Makihira Keita	K-1 World GP 2015 -70kg Championship Tournament, Quarter Finals	Tokyo, Japan	Decision (unanimous)	3	3:00
2015-05-02	Win	(Thailand) Sitthichai Sitsongpeenong	Kunlun Fight 24	Verona, Italy	Decision (unanimous)	3	3:00
2014-12-13	Loss	(Thailand) Sitthichai Sitsongpeenong	Victory 2	Levallois, France	Decision	3	3:00
2014-11-15	Draw	(Thailand) Saensatharn P.K. Saenchai Muaythaigym	Top King World Series	France	Draw	3	3:00
2014-10-05	Loss	(Thailand) Aikpracha Meenayothin	Kunlun Fight 11 - World MAX 2014 Final 8	Macao, China	Decision	3	3:00
2014-07-27	Win	(Iran) Seyedisa Alamdarnezam	Kunlun Fight 7 - World MAX 2014 Final 16	Zhoukou, China	Decision(Unanimous)	3	3:00
2014-06-14	Loss	(Thailand) Ekarit Mor KrungthepThonburi	Monte Carlo Fighting Masters 2014	Monte Carlo, Monaco	Decision (Split)	5	3:00
Fight Was For WMC Super Lightweight World Title
2014-04-12	Win	(Netherlands) Amine Attalhaoui	Championnat du Monde de Boxe Thai	France	TKO	3	
Wins the WAKO Pro 63.5kg World Title
2013-12-10	Loss	(Australia) Victor Nagbe	Max Muaythai - The Final Chapter Tournament, Semi Final	Khon Kaen, Thailand	Decision	3	3:00
2013-11-02	Loss	(England) Liam Harrison	The Main Event 2013	Manchester, England	Decision (unanimous)	5	3:00
2013-10-06	Loss	(Thailand) Jingreedtong Seatransferry	Max Muay Thai Sendai Qualifying Tournament Final	Sendai, Japan	Decision	3	3:00
Fight Was For Max Muay Thai 67kg Qualifying Tournament Title
2013-10-06	Win	(Japan) Yuya Yamato	Max Muay Thai Sendai Qualifying Tournament Semi Finals	Sendai, Japan	Decision	3	3:00
2013-09-07	Loss	(Thailand) Kem Sitsongpeenong	Millenium Team Fight	La Réunion	Decision (Split)	5	3:00
Fight Was For WBC Muaythai Super Welterweight World Title
2013-05-06	Loss	(Thailand) Kem Sitsongpeenong	MAX Muay Thai 1	Surin, Thailand	Decision (unanimous)	3	3:00
2013-03-02	Win	(Thailand) Kaew Fairtex	Warriors Night 1	Paris, France	Decision (Unanimous)	5	3:00
2012-11-20	Win	(France) Hafed Romdhane	A1 WCC Muay Thai	France	KO	4	
2012-10-20	Win	(Thailand) Saiyok Pumpanmuang	Roschtigrabe Derby	Switzerland	TKO (knee injury)	1	3:00
2012-09-19	Win	(France) Sidi Koite	Thai Fight Lyon	Lyon, France	TKO	2	
2012-08-17	Win	(England) Soloman Wickstead	Thai Fight England	Leicester, England	Decision	3	3:00
2012-06-02	Win	(Italy) Angelo Campoli	La Nuit de Challenges	France	TKO	1	
2012-05-04	Win	(France) Mhand Boukkedim	King of the Ring	France	KO	3	
2011-12-10	Loss	(Italy) Alessio D'Angelo	International Fight Show 2011	Italy	Decision	3	3:00
Legend: Win Loss Draw/No contest Notes
