= 2024 in UAE Warriors =

Information
- Promotion: UAE Warriors
- First date: January 20, 2024
- Last date: October 23, 2024

Events
- Total events: 10

Fights
- Total fights: 129
- Title fights: 7

2024 is the 12th year in the history of UAE Warriors, a mixed martial arts promotion based in the United Arab Emirates.

== List of events ==
#	Event	Date	Venue	Location
1	UAE Warriors 46	January 20, 2024	Mubadala Arena	Abu Dhabi, United Arab Emirates
2	UAE Warriors 47: Arabia 13	January 21, 2024	Mubadala Arena	Abu Dhabi, United Arab Emirates
3	UAE Warriors 48	March 3, 2024	Expocentro of Balneário Camboriú	Santa Catarina, Brazil
4	UAE Warriors 49: Arabia vs. Africa	May 17, 2024	ADNEC Marina	Abu Dhabi, United Arab Emirates
5	UAE Warriors 50	May 18, 2024	ADNEC Marina	Abu Dhabi, United Arab Emirates
6	UAE Warriors 51	July 27, 2024	ADNEC Marina	Abu Dhabi, United Arab Emirates
7	UAE Warriors 52: Arabia 14	July 28, 2024	ADNEC Marina	Abu Dhabi, United Arab Emirates
8	UAE Warriors 53: Arabia vs. Africa	September 27, 2024	ADNEC Marina	Abu Dhabi, United Arab Emirates
9	UAE Warriors 54: Jumaev vs. Sadygov	September 28, 2024	ADNEC Marina	Abu Dhabi, United Arab Emirates
10	UAE Warriors 55: Abdullaev vs. Boynazarov	October 23, 2024	ADNEC Exhibition Center	Abu Dhabi, United Arab Emirates

== UAE Warriors 46 ==
UAE Warriors 46
- Promotion: UAE Warriors
- Date: January 20, 2024
- Venue: Mubadala Arena
- City: Abu Dhabi, United Arab Emirates

UAE Warriors 46 was a mixed martial arts event promoted by UAE Warriors and took place on January 20, 2024, at the Mubadala Arena in Abu Dhabi, United Arab Emirates. It aired on UFC Fight Pass.

=== Background ===
A Lightweight bout between UFC veteran Alex da Silva Coelho and the promotional newcomer Dinislam Kamavov headlined the event.

=== Results ===
UAEW 46
Weight Class				Method	Round	Time	Notes
Lightweight 70 kg	(Brazil) Alex da Silva Coelho	def.	(Russia) Dinislam Kamavov	Decision (unanimous)	3	5:00	
Bantamweight 61 kg	(Australia) Trent Girdham	vs.	(Georgia (country)) Dimitri Bolkvadze	No Contest (illegal punches)	2	4:02	
Welterweight 77 kg	(Tajikistan) Samandar Murodov	def.	(Uzbekistan) Bobur Kurbonov	TKO (shoulder injury)	1	5:00	
Featherweight 66 kg	(Philippines) Mark Gregory Valerio	def.	(Cameroon) Jaures Dea	KO (punch)	1	1:39	
Flyweight 57 kg	(Russia) Rashid Vagabov	def.	(Kyrgyzstan) Zhakshylyk Konurbaev	Technical Submission (arm-triangle choke)	1	2:09	
Featherweight 66 kg	(Morocco) Maraoune Bellagouit	def.	(South Africa) Vince Bembe	Decision (unanimous)	3	5:00	
Lightweight 70 kg	(France) Dylan Salvador	def.	(Philippines) Carls John de Tomas	Submission (rear-naked choke)	1	4:43	
Flyweight 57 kg	(United States) Mark Climaco	def.	(South Africa) Tumelo Manyamala	Decision (split)	3	5:00	
Women's Strawweight 52 kg	(Chile) Valentina Escobar	def.	(Russia) Viktoriya Tskhovrebova	Submission (rear-naked choke)	1	3:10	
Bantamweight 61 kg	(Russia) Ullubiy Amirzhanov	def.	(Thailand) Thiraphong Chaikaew	Submission (rear-naked choke)	1	3:50	

== UAE Warriors 47: Arabia 13 ==
UAE Warriors 47: Arabia 13
- Promotion: UAE Warriors
- Date: January 21, 2024
- Venue: Mubadala Arena
- City: Abu Dhabi, United Arab Emirates

UAE Warriors 47: Arabia 13 was a mixed martial arts event promoted by UAE Warriors and took place on January 21, 2024, at the Mubadala Arena in Abu Dhabi, United Arab Emirates. It aired on UFC Fight Pass.

=== Background ===
An UAE Warriors Arabia Welterweight Championship bout between reigning champion (also UAE Warriors Africa Welterweight champion) Wisem Hammami and contender Omran Chaaban headlined the event.

=== Results ===
UAEW 47
Weight Class				Method	Round	Time	Notes
Welterweight 77 kg	(Finland) Omran Chaaban	def.	(Italy) Wisem Hammami (c)	Submission (arm-triangle choke)	5	0:44	For the UAE Warriors Arabia Welterweight Championship
Welterweight 77 kg	(Egypt) Omar El Dafrawy	def.	(Kuwait) Abdulla Al Bousheiri	KO (knee)	1	2:20	
Catchweight 72 kg	(South Korea) Kim Tae-kyun	def.	(Philippines) Carls John de Tomas	TKO (punches)	1	2:22	
Catchweight 63.5 kg	(France) Mehdi Saadi	def.	(Jordan) Jalal Al Daaja	KO (punches)	3	2:29	
Catchweight 88 kg	(Lebanon) Mohamad Osseili	def.	(Egypt) Abdul Elwahab Saeed	TKO (punches and elbow)	2	4:00	
Flyweight 57 kg	(Egypt) Maysara Mohamed	def.	(Chile) Alfredo Muaiad	Decision (split)	3	5:00	
Lightweight 70 kg	(Palestine) Yazan Jaber	def.	(Iraq) Ali Abbas	Decision (split)	3	5:00	
Lightweight 70 kg	(France) Souhil Tahiri	def.	(Netherlands) Mo Elawil	TKO (punches)	2	3:41	
Women's Featherweight 66 kg	(England) Eman Almudhaf	def.	(Egypt) Hager Rajab Hammad	TKO (punches)	1	1:02	
Lightweight 70 kg	(Morocco) Abderrahman Errachidy	def.	(Canada) Ahmed Shishani	TKO (punches)	1	4:03	
Welterweight 77 kg	(Egypt) Eslam Mostafa	def.	(France) Idriss M'roivili	Decision (unanimous)	3	5:00	
Bantamweight 61 kg	(Sweden) Ali Yazbeck	def.	(Egypt) Mohamed Mamdooh	Submission (rear-naked choke)	3	1:58	

== UAE Warriors 48 ==
UAE Warriors 48
- Promotion: UAE Warriors
- Date: March 3, 2024
- Venue: Expocentro
- City: Balneário Camboriú, Santa Catarina, Brazil

UAE Warriors 48 was a mixed martial arts event promoted by UAE Warriors and took place on March 3, 2024 at the Expocentro of Balneário Camboriú in Santa Catarina, Brazil. It aired on UFC Fight Pass.

=== Background ===
The event marked the promotion's first visit to Brazil. It is also the first event as organization to host outside United Arab Emirates.

A featherweight bout between former Pancrase Bantamweight champion Rafael Silva and Vicente Vargas headlined the event.

=== Results ===
UAEW 48
Weight Class				Method	Round	Time	Notes
Featherweight 66 kg	(Peru) Vicente Vargas	def.	(Brazil) Rafael Silva	TKO (punches)	3	2:14	
Weltereight 77 kg	(Brazil) Carlos Leal	def.	(Brazil) Márcio Breno	TKO (punches)	1	4:10	
Bantamweight 61 kg	(Brazil) Lucas Pereira	def.	(Uruguay) Leandro Martin Aranguren	TKO (flying knee and punches)	2	3:52	
Middleweight 84 kg	(Brazil) Gian Siqueira	def.	(Argentina) Cristian Dominguez	Decision (unanimous)	3	5:00	
Catchweight 72.5 kg	(Brazil) Vinicius Cenci	def.	(Guinea-Bissau) Yabna N’Tchalá	Decision (split)	3	5:00	
Catchweight 72.5 kg	(Uruguay) Luiz Eduardo Garagorri	def.	(Brazil) Wilian Poles	TKO (punches)	3	1:38	
Women's Flyweight 57 kg	(Brazil) Jady Menezes	def.	(Argentina) Gisela Luna	TKO (body kick and punches)	2	4:26	
Bantamweight 61 kg	(Morocco) Badr Attif	def.	(Brazil) Breno Yuri Santos	Submission (brabo choke)	2	3:28	
Featherweight 66 kg	(Argentina) Lucas Miletich	def.	(Brazil) Marcos Novais	KO (punch)	1	2:26	
Women's Catchweight 63.5 kg	(Brazil) Cláudia Leite	def.	(Brazil) Priscila Ferreira	Decision (unanimous)	3	5:00	
Middleweight 84 kg	(Cuba) Vladimir Calvo	def.	(Russia) Soslan Margiev	Decision (unanimous)	3	5:00	

== UAE Warriors 49: Arabia vs. Africa ==
UAE Warriors 49: Arabia vs. Africa
- Promotion: UAE Warriors
- Date: May 17, 2024
- Venue: ADNEC Marina
- City: Abu Dhabi, United Arab Emirates

UAE Warriors 49: Arabia vs. Africa was a mixed martial arts event promoted by UAE Warriors and that took place on May 17, 2024, at the ADNEC Marina in Abu Dhabi, United Arab Emirates. It aired on UFC Fight Pass.

=== Background ===
The main event featured a bantamweight showdown between former BAMMA Flyweight champion Rany Saadeh and Cedric Doyle.

=== Results ===
UAEW 49
Weight Class				Method	Round	Time	Notes
Bantamweight 61 kg	(Germany) Rany Saadeh	def.	(South Africa) Cedric Doyle	Submission (heel hook)	1	0:58	
Welterweight 77 kg	(Kuwait) Abdulla Al Bousheiri	def.	(Senegal) Babacar Niang	Submission (armbar)	1	3:42	
Featherweight 66 kg	(Cameroon) Jaures Dea Gomez	def.	(Philippines) Rufino Mante	TKO (punches)	1	1:11	
Featherweight 66 kg	(Sweden) Ali Yazbeck	vs.	(Guinea) Mohamed Camara	Draw (split)	3	5:00	
Flyweight 57 kg	(South Africa) Sithembiso Hadebe	def.	(Egypt) Mahmoud Atef	TKO (punches and elbows)	2	1:06	
Heavyweight 120 kg	(France) Badr Medkouri	def.	(South Africa) Thabani Mndebela	KO (punches)	3	3:33	
Middleweight 84 kg	(Russia) Sharapudin Ziyaudinov	def.	(United States) Mariano Jones	TKO (punches)	1	2:07	
Catchweight 87 kg	(Sweden) Khaled Laallam	def.	(Uganda) Lawrence Mukiibi	Submission (arm-triangle choke)	1	3:39	
Women's Catchweight 59 kg	(South Africa) Ceileigh Niedermayr	def.	(Turkey) Sabriye Şengül	Decision (unanimous)	3	5:00	Şengül was deducted one point in round 3 due to put your hand to back of the head.
Catchweight 68 kg	(Jordan) Saleem Al-Bakri	def.	(Uganda) Henry Kirangwa	Decision (unanimous)	3	5:00	
Lightweight 70 kg	(Iraq) Harda Karim	def.	(South Africa) Tapiwa Katikati	TKO (elbows)	1	4:19	
Weltereight 77 kg	(Algeria) Abdelkrim Zouad	def.	(Norway) Magnus Onyeka Iversen	Decision (unanimous)	3	5:00	

== UAE Warriors 50 ==
UAE Warriors 50
- Promotion: UAE Warriors
- Date: May 18, 2024
- Venue: ADNEC Marina
- City: Abu Dhabi, United Arab Emirates

UAE Warriors 50 was a mixed martial arts event promoted by UAE Warriors and that took place on May 18, 2024, at the ADNEC Marina in Abu Dhabi, United Arab Emirates. It aired on UFC Fight Pass.

=== Background ===
A UAE Warriors Featherweight Championship bout between reigning champion (also UAE Warriors Arabia Featherweight champion) Ali AlQaisi and challenger Samuel Bark headlined the event.

=== Results ===
UAEW 50
Weight Class				Method	Round	Time	Notes
Featherweight 66 kg	(Sweden) Samuel Bark	def.	(Jordan) Ali AlQaisi (c)	Decision (unanimous)	5	5:00	For the UAE Warriors Featherweight Championship.
Welterweight 77 kg	(Azerbaijan) Tahir Abdullaev	def.	(Russia) Shakhban Alkhasov	TKO (punches)	2	4:35	For the vacant UAE Warriors Welterweight Championship.
Flyweight 57 kg	(Brazil) Iago Ribeiro	def.	(Japan) Yamato Fujita	TKO (elbows and punches)	3	2:22	For the inaugural UAE Warriors Flyweight Championship.
Welterweight 77 kg	(Uzbekistan) Jakhongir Jumaev	def.	(Portugal) Andre Fialho	KO (punches)	1	2:23	
Light Heavyweight 93 kg	(Kazakhstan) Diyar Nurgozhay	def.	(Argentina) Emiliano Sordi	TKO (punches)	1	4:17	
Middleweight 84 kg	(Russia) Alibek Suleimanov	def.	(Malaysia) Agilan Thani	Submission (guillotine choke)	2	2:22	
Catchweight 73 kg	(Ukraine) Vladyslav Rudniev	def.	(Georgia (country)) Nika Kupravishvili	Decision (unanimous)	3	5:00	
Catchweight 87 kg	(Lebanon) Mohamad Osseili	def	(Uzbekistan) Mamurjon Khamidov	TKO (retirement)	2	4:00	
Bantamweight 61 kg	(Brazil) Lucas Pereira	def.	(Philippines) Ariel Oliveros	KO (punch)	1	4:36	
Women's Flyweight 57 kg	(Kyrgyzstan) Anelya Toktogonova	def.	(Sweden) Elin Öberg	Submission (rear-naked choke)	3	4:01	
Catchweight 64 kg	(Russia) Ullubiy Amirzhanov	def.	(Kyrgyzstan) Syimyk Mahmedov	Submission (guillotine choke)	2	1:08	

== UAE Warriors 51 ==
UAE Warriors 51
- Promotion: UAE Warriors
- Date: July 27, 2024
- Venue: ADNEC Marina
- City: Abu Dhabi, United Arab Emirates

UAE Warriors 51 was a mixed martial arts event promoted by UAE Warriors and that took place on July 27, 2024, at the ADNEC Marina in Abu Dhabi, United Arab Emirates. It aired on UFC Fight Pass.

=== Background ===
A UAE Warriors Lightweight Championship bout between reigning champion Amru Magomedov and challenger Ali Kabdulla headlined the event

=== Fight card ===
UAEW 51
Weight Class				Method	Round	Time	Notes
Lightweight 70 kg	(Russia) Amru Magomedov (c)	def.	(Kazakhstan) Ali Kabdulla	Submission (rear-naked choke)	2	4:00	For the UAE Warriors Lightweight Championship.
Featherweight 66 kg	(Peru) Vicente Vargas	def.	(Italy) Walter Cogliandro	Decision (unanimous)	3	5:00	
Light Heavyweight 93 kg	(Netherlands) Reinier de Ridder	def.	(Turkey) Magomedmurad Khasaev	TKO (punches)	1	2:24	
Welterweight 77 kg	(Uzbekistan) Khotam Boynazarov	def.	(Georgia (country)) Giorgi Egnatashvili	Decision (unanimous)	3	5:00	
Catchweight 73 kg	(Russia) Magomed Zaynukov	def.	(Brazil) Wilian Poles	Decision (unanimous)	3	5:00	
Catchweight 73 kg	(Ukraine) Vladislav Rudnev	vs.	(Kazakhstan) Nurkhan Zhumagazy	Technical Submission (rear-naked choke)	2	2:59	
Catchweight 88 kg	(Russia) Khabib Nabiev	def.	(Brazil) Bruce Souto	Submission (rear-naked choke)	1	3:57	
Featherweight 66 kg	(Albania) Vilson Ndregjoni	def.	(Australia) Trent Girdham	Decision (unanimous)	3	5:00	
Heavyweight 120 kg	(Russia) Arslan Bilalov	def.	(Bosnia and Herzegovina) Benjamin Šehić	Decision (unanimous)	3	5:00	
Flyweight 57 kg	(Brazil) Isaac Pimentel	def.	(Philippines) Genil Francisco	TKO (punches)	2	3:20	
Flyweight 57 kg	(Russia) Rashid Vagabov	def.	(Azerbaijan) Bairam Shammadov	Submission (guillotine choke)	1	N/A	
Women's Strawweight 52 kg	(Brazil) Carolina Foro Antunes	def.	(Moldova) Marina Nica	KO (spinning back kick)	1	2:41	
Catchweight 80 kg	(Azerbaijan) Ali Iskender Aliev	def.	(Belgium) Rustam Serbiev	Decision (unanimous)	3	5:00	
Bantamweight 61 kg	(Azerbaijan) Asaf Chopurov	def.	(Japan) Su Sung-cho	Submission (rear-naked choke)	3	2:32	

== UAE Warriors 52: Arabia 14 ==
UAE Warriors 51
- Promotion: UAE Warriors
- Date: July 28, 2024
- Venue: ADNEC Marina
- City: Abu Dhabi, United Arab Emirates

UAE Warriors 52: Arabia 14 was a mixed martial arts event promoted by UAE Warriors and that took place on July 28, 2024, at the ADNEC Marina in Abu Dhabi, United Arab Emirates. It aired on UFC Fight Pass.

=== Background ===
A 209-pounds catchweight bout between Kevin Oumar and Mohamed Juma headlined the event.

=== Fight card ===
UAEW 52
Weight Class				Method	Round	Time	Notes
Catchweight 95 kg	(France) Kevin Oumar	def.	(South Sudan) Mohamed Juma	Decision (majority)	3	5:00	
Bantamweight 61 kg	(Finland) Abdul Hussein	def.	(Egypt) Mahmoud Abdel Raouf	Technical Submission (rear-naked choke)	1	3:40	
Catchweight 86 kg	(Sweden) Khaled Laallam	def.	(South Africa) Diego Bandu	Decision (unanimous)	3	5:00	
Catchweight 88 kg	(Norway) Mohamed Zarey	def.	(Egypt) Abdul Elwahab Saeed	Decision (unanimous)	3	5:00	
Catchweight 60 kg	(Uzbekistan) Kamron Ortikov	def.	(Philippines) Nico Allego	Decision (unanimous)	3	5:00	
Welterweight 77 kg	(Finland) Omar Tugarev	def.	(Tunisia) Samir Selmi	Submission (arm-triangle choke)	1	1:07	
Welterweight 77 kg	(Lebanon) Khaled Taraf	def.	(Iraq) Muhamad Talabani	TKO (knee and punches)	1	0:28	
Heavyweight 120 kg	(France) Badr Medkouri	def.	(Egypt) Mahmoud Mohamed Afia	TKO (punches)	1	0:41	
Catchweight 73 kg	(Lebanon) Elias Mansour	def.	(Algeria) Aboubkeur Houari	Decision (unanimous)	3	5:00	
Women's Featherweight 66 kg	(England) Lisa Zimmo	vs.	(Egypt) Rewan Yasser	TKO (punches)	3	2:08	
Bantamweight 61 kg	(Morocco) Walid Ait Tami	def.	(Tunisia) Jasser BelKilani	TKO (punches)	2	1:25	
Middleweight 84 kg	(Iraq) Mohamed Salah	def.	(Morocco) Aymane Benhayoune	Submission (arm-triangle choke)	1	2:22	

== UAE Warriors 53: Arabia vs. Africa ==
UAE Warriors 53
- Promotion: UAE Warriors
- Date: September 27, 2024
- Venue: ADNEC Marina
- City: Abu Dhabi, United Arab Emirates

UAE Warriors 53: Arabia vs. Africa was a mixed martial arts event promoted by UAE Warriors and that took place on September 27, 2024, at the ADNEC Marina in Abu Dhabi, United Arab Emirates. It aired on UFC Fight Pass.

=== Fight card ===
UAEW 53
Weight Class				Method	Round	Time	Notes
Bantamweight 61 kg	(Angola) Demarte Pena	def.	(Lebanon) Marcel Adur	Decision (unanimous)	3	5:00	
Flyweight 57 kg	(Egypt) Maysara Mohamed	def.	(South Africa) Gift Walker	Decision (unanimous)	3	5:00	
Flyweight 57 kg	(Chile) Alfredo Muaiad	def.	(South Africa) Sithembiso Hadebe	Decision (split)	3	5:00	
Women's Strawweight 52 kg	(Australia) Amena Hadaya	vs.	(Morocco) Hassna Gaber	Decision (split)	3	5:00	
Featherweight 66 kg	(Zimbabwe) Sylvester Chipfumbu	def.	(Egypt) Mahmoud Mando	TKO (punches)	1	4:20	
Super Welterweight 79.5 kg	(Finland) Omar Tugarev	def.	(Morocco) Issam Azelhad	Submission (arm-triangle choke)	1	2:12	
Catchweight 58 kg	(Egypt) Mahmoud Atef	def.	(Egypt) Issa Salem	KO (punch)	1	3:50	
Lightweight 70 kg	(Jordan) Abood AlQaisi	def.	(Uganda) Manana Rodgers Mukyeda	Technical Submission (guillotine choke)	1	0:32	
Women's Catchweight 54 kg	(England) Lisa Zimmo	def.	(Egypt) Sohila Sleem	TKO (punches)	1	2:44	
Featherweight 66 kg	(Belgium) Slimen Hassaini	def.	(Zimbabwe) Lewis Mataya	Submission (heel hook)	1	1:59	
Welterweight 77 kg	(Algeria) Abdelkrim Zouad	def.	(France) Idriss M'roivili	TKO (punches)	2	1:37	

== UAE Warriors 54: Jumaev vs. Sadygov ==
UAE Warriors 54
- Promotion: UAE Warriors
- Date: September 27, 2024
- Venue: ADNEC Marina
- City: Abu Dhabi, United Arab Emirates

UAE Warriors 54: Jumaev vs. Sadygov was a mixed martial arts event promoted by UAE Warriors and that took place on September 28, 2024, at the ADNEC Marina in Abu Dhabi, United Arab Emirates. It aired on UFC Fight Pass.

=== Fight card ===
UAEW 54
Weight Class				Method	Round	Time	Notes
Catchweight 74 kg	(Azerbaijan) Shakhmar Sadygov	def.	(Uzbekistan) Jakhongir Jumaev	Decision (Split)	3	5:00	
Flyweight 57 kg	(Japan) Yamato Fujita	def.	(Russia) Batukhan Baysuev	Decision (Split)	3	5:00	
Lightweight 70 kg	(Russia) Gamid Khizriev	def.	(Tajikistan) Abdullo Khodzhaev	Decision (Split)	3	5:00	
Bantamweight 61 kg	(Finland) Abdul Hussein	def.	(India) Hansraj Samota	TKO (Punches)	2	4:25	
Catchweight 63 kg	(Azerbaijan) Mehemmedeli Osmanli	def.	(Russia) Shamil Boraev	Submission (Anaconda Choke)	2	1:57	
Featherweight 66 kg	(Egypt) Hussein Salem	vs.	(Philippines) Jayson Margallo	Submission (Guillotine Choke)	1	1:57	
Women's Strawweight 52 kg	(Brazil) Lany Silva	def.	(Georgia (country)) Sofiia Bagishvili	Submission (Heel Hook)	1	3:57	
Catchweight 59 kg	(Russia) Israil Gadzhiagaev	def.	(Armenia) Karlen Minasyan	Decision (Unanimous)	3	5:00	
Catchweight 80 kg	(Brazil) Anderson Queiroz	def.	(Philippines) Jonathan Veluz	TKO (Punches)	1	1:00	
Bantamweight 61 kg	(Russia) Magomedrasul Saybunov	def.	(Azerbaijan) Agil Akhmedov	Submission (Rear-Naked Choke)	1	2:56	
Catchweight 73 kg	(Lithuania) Dominykas Norkus	def.	(England) Maximillian Flynn	TKO (Punches)	2	1:37	
Lightweight 70 kg	(Russia) Kurban Zaynukov	def.	(Kyrgyzstan) Syimyk Makhmedov	Submission (Rear-Naked Choke)	3	2:46	

== UAE Warriors 55: Abdullaev vs. Boynazarov ==
UAE Warriors 55: Abdullaev vs. Boynazarov
- Promotion: UAE Warriors
- Date: October 23, 2024
- Venue: ADNEC Exhibition Center
- City: Abu Dhabi, United Arab Emirates

UAE Warriors 55: Abdullaev vs. Boynazarov was a mixed martial arts event promoted by UAE Warriors and that took place on October 23, 2024, at the ADNEC Exhibition Center in Abu Dhabi, United Arab Emirates. It aired on UFC Fight Pass.

=== Fight card ===
UAEW 55
Weight Class				Method	Round	Time	Notes
Welterweight 77 kg	(Uzbekistan) Khotam Boynazarov	def.	(Azerbaijan) Tahir Abdullaev (c)	Decision (unanimous)	5	5:00	For the UAE Warriors Welterweight Championship.
Women's Strawweight 52 kg	(Australia) Jacinta Austin	def.	(Chile) Valentina Escobar	Decision (split)	5	5:00	For the inaugural UAE Warriors Strawweight Championship.
Lightweight 70 kg	(Brazil) Bruno Azeredo	def.	(Uruguay) Luiz Eduardo Garagorri	TKO (punches)	2	3:32	
Catchweight 86 kg	(Syria) Tarek Suleiman	def.	(Norway) Ole Magnor	Decision (unanimous)	3	5:00	
Catchweight 85 kg	(Brazil) Rodrigo Cavalheiro Correia	def.	(Kazakhstan) Erkin Darmenov	KO (punch)	1	2:53	
Welterweight 77 kg	(Azerbaijan) Ali Iskender Aliev	def.	(Russia) Magomedrasul Khakhulmagomedov	KO (flying knee)	1	0:45	
Catchweight 80 kg	(Iran) Amir Hossein Alipour	def.	(Brazil) Robson Gracie Jr.	Decision (unanimous)	3	5:00	
Flyweight 57 kg	(Uzbekistan) Kamron Ortikov	def.	(Russia) Murad Maganaev	Decision (unanimous)	3	5:00	
Welterweight 77 kg	(Kuwait) Abdulla Al Bousheiri	def.	(Norway) Ole-Jørgen Mandt Johnsen	Decision (split)	3	5:00	
Middleweight 84 kg	(Brazil) Diego Dias	def.	(Turkey) Aigun Akhmedov	Submission (triangle choke)	2	4:28	
Featherweight 66 kg	(Uzbekistan) Akbarjon Islomboev	def.	(England) Ben Royle	TKO (punches)	2	1:31	
Featherweight 66 kg	(Kazakhstan) Samir Akhmedov	def.	(Russia) Ullubiy Amirzhanov	Technical Submission (ninja choke)	2	0:59	

== See also ==
- 2024 in UFC
- 2024 in Bellator MMA
- 2024 in Professional Fighters League
- 2024 in ONE Championship
- 2024 in Absolute Championship Akhmat
- 2024 in Konfrontacja Sztuk Walki
- 2024 in Rizin Fighting Federation
- 2024 in Oktagon MMA
- 2024 in Brave Combat Federation
- 2024 in Legacy Fighting Alliance
- 2024 in Road FC
