= Abdul-Kerim Edilov =

Russian mixed martial artist and politician

- Born: 25 November 1991; Checheno-Ingush ASSR, Soviet Union
- Died: 29 December 2022 (aged 31)
- Nationality: Russian
- Height: 6 ft 3 in (190.5 cm)
- Weight: 205 lb (93 kg)
- Division: Light Heavyweight
- Team: Fight Club Akhmat

Mixed martial arts record
- Total: 21
- Wins: 17
- By knockout: 9
- By submission: 7
- By decision: 1
- Losses: 4
- By submission: 3
- By decision: 1

Other information
- Mixed martial arts record from Sherdog

Abdul-Kerim Edilov (25 November 1991 – 29 December 2022) was a Russian mixed martial artist who competed in the Light Heavyweight division. Notably associated with the Ultimate Fighting Championship, Edilov was also known for his close ties to Chechen leader Ramzan Kadyrov, having served as the Chechnya's Vice-Premier and Minister of Sports.

Edilov died in December 2022, with the circumstances of his death attracting attention and discussion.

== Early life ==
Edilov was born on November 25, 1991, in Chechnya, Russia.

== Mixed Martial Arts ==
Edilov began his mixed martial arts career in the early 2010s. Initially scheduled to debut in the Ultimate Fighting Championship in 2016, Edilov faced a setback due to a 15-month suspension by the UFC after testing positive for meldonium, a banned substance.

Edilov made a successful UFC debut in 2017, defeating Bojan Mihajlovic by a second-round technical knockout (TKO). In 2018, Edilov left the UFC, reportedly requesting his release to join Absolute Championships Akhmat (ACA), a promotion formed from the merger of several organizations.

On May 28, 2019, it was reported that Edilov was removed from the UFC roster.

== Relationship with Ramzan Kadyrov ==
Edilov was associated with Ramzan Kadyrov, the leader of Chechnya. In his political career, Edilov served as deputy prime minister of Chechnya. In September 2022, allegations of drug use surfaced, leading to speculation about Edilov's standing within Kadyrov's inner circle. Following these allegations, Edilov's public appearances and social media activity significantly diminished.

On 23 November 2022, it was officially announced that Edilov had resigned from his position as deputy prime minister, a decision stated to be made "at his own initiative". The lack of clarity surrounding the circumstances of his resignation and subsequent reduction in public visibility contributed to rumors about a potential estrangement from Kadyrov.

== Death ==
Edilov died under mysterious circumstances after a "falling out" with Chechen leader Ramzan Kadyrov's family at the age of 31 in December 2022. His death was reported by Chechen opposition movements, leading to speculation about the cause and manner of his death.

== Mixed martial arts record ==
Professional record breakdown
21 matches	17 wins	4 losses
By knockout	9	0
By submission	7	3
By decision	1	1

Res.	Record	Opponent	Method	Event	Date	Round	Time	Location	Notes
Win	17–4	Bojan Mihajlović	TKO (punches)	UFC Fight Night: Volkov vs. Struve	September 2, 2017	2	2:32	Rotterdam, Netherlands	
Win	16–4	Leonardo Gosling	TKO (leg kicks)	WFCA 3	June 13, 2015	1	0:36	Grozny, Russia	
Win	15–4	Tiago Mônaco Tosato	Submission (rear-naked choke)	WFCA 1	March 14, 2015	1	2:28	Grozny, Russia	
Win	14–4	Gilliard Alfredo Fagundes	Submission (rear-naked choke)	Fight Nights: Battle of Moscow 18	December 20, 2014	1	0:50	Moscow, Russia	
Win	13–4	Cristhian Torres	Submission (rear-naked choke)	ACB 10	October 4, 2014	1	1:42	Grozny, Russia	
Win	12–4	Fernando Almeida	Decision (unanimous)	ACB 9	June 22, 2014	1	2:17	Grozny, Russia	
Win	11–4	Lahat Faye	TKO (punch and soccer kick)	Fight Nights: Battle of Moscow 15	March 28, 2014	1	1:35	Moscow, Russia	
Win	10–4	Pavel Tretyakov	TKO (punches)	Fight Nights: Krepost Selection 3	February 15, 2014	1	2:28	Moscow, Russia	
Win	9–4	Michał Gutowski	TKO (punches)	Fight Nights: Battle on Terek	October 4, 2013	1	0:37	Grozny, Russia	
Win	8–4	Radjabov Sohib	Submission (rear-naked choke)	Cage Warriors 58	August 24, 2013	1	0:45	Grozny, Russia	Catchweight (210 lb) bout.
Win	7–4	Jiří Procházka	Submission (rear-naked choke)	Fight Nights: Battle of Moscow 12	June 20, 2013	1	1:56	Moscow, Russia	
Loss	6–4	Charles Andrade	Submission (guillotine choke)	Fight Nights: Battle of Moscow 11	April 20, 2013	1	0:58	Moscow, Russia	
Win	6–3	Nicholas Boyarchuk	Submission (rear-naked choke)	Fight Nights: Battle of Moscow 9	December 16, 2012	1	1:14	Moscow, Russia	
Win	5–3	Gadzhimurad Antigulov	TKO (punches)	Dictator FC 1	June 28, 2012	1	2:28	Moscow, Russia	
Loss	4–3	Viktor Nemkov	Decision (unanimous)	League S-70: Russian Grand Prix 2011 (Stage 3)	April 6, 2012	3	5:00	Moscow, Russia	
Win	4–2	Alexander Grebenkin	TKO (punches)	ProFC 22	December 17, 2010	1	2:40	Rostov-on-Don, Russia	
Win	3–2	Murad Kamilov	TKO (punches)	ProFC 19: Cup of Russia 2010 Stage 1	November 13, 2010	1	1:30	Taganrog, Russia	Won the 2010 ProFC Light Heavyweight Tournament.
Win	2–2	Dmitriy Surnev	Submission (triangle choke)	ProFC 19: Cup of Russia 2010 Stage 1	November 13, 2010	1	2:36	Taganrog, Russia	2010 ProFC Light Heavyweight Tournament Semifinal.
Loss	1–2	Abdurakhman Nurmagomedov	Technical Submission (triangle choke)	Golden Fist of Russia 1	June 10, 2010	1	1:59	Moscow, Russia	Light Heavyweight debut.
Win	1–1	Igor Saveliev	Decision (unanimous)	M-1 Selection 2010: Eastern Europe Round 2	April 10, 2010	3	5:00	Kyiv, Ukraine	
Loss	0–1	Stanislav Molodtsov	Submission (armbar)	Atrium Pankration Cup 2010	March 10, 2010	1	2:11	Moscow, Russia	Middleweight debut.
