= Tsarev =

Tsarev or Tsareva means of czar in several Slavic languages, and may refer to:

- Tsarev, Russia, a village in Volgograd Oblast in Russia

It may also refer to

- Tsarev Brod, a village in northeastern Bulgaria
- Tsareva Livada, a village in northern central Bulgaria
- Tsareva Polyana, a village in southern Bulgaria

== See also ==
- Tsaryov
- Gibbons–Tsarev equation
