= Tsaryov =

Tsaryov or Tsarev (Russian: Царёв, from царь meaning czar) is a Russian masculine surname, its feminine counterpart is Tsaryova or Tsareva. Notable people with the surname include:

- Galina Tsareva (born 1950), Soviet sprint cyclist
- Larisa Tsaryova (born 1958), Russian swimmer
- Michail Tsarev (born 1986), Russian mixed martial artist
- Oleg Tsaryov (born 1970), Ukrainian businessman
- Valentina Tsaryova (1926–2015), Soviet cross country skier
- Viktor Tsaryov (1931–2017), Russian football player
- Viktor Tsaryov (1939–2020), Soviet sprint canoeist
- Vyacheslav Tsaryov (1971–2010), Russian football player
- Andrei Tsaryov (1977) (born 1977), Russian former professional ice hockey forward
- Andrei Tsaryov (1975) (born 1975), Russian former professional ice hockey goaltender
- Andrei Tsaryov (born 1975), Russian science fiction author
