= Andrei Tsaryov =

Andrei Tsaryov may refer to:

- Andrei Tsaryov (1977) (born 1977), Russian former professional ice hockey forward
- Andrei Tsaryov (1975) (born 1975), Russian former professional ice hockey goaltender
