= Mark Striegl =

Professional mixed martial artist (born 1988)

Personal information
- Born: Mark Edward Martinez Striegl; June 23, 1988 (age 38) Tokyo, Japan
- Education: San Diego State University, Point Loma Nazarene University
- Spouse: Starr Cabuco
- Children: 2

Sport
- Martial arts career
- Other names: Mugen
- Nationality: Philippines
- Height: 5 ft 8 in (173 cm)
- Weight: 145 lb (66 kg; 10 st 5 lb)
- Division: Featherweight, Bantamweight
- Reach: 68 in (173 cm)
- Style: Wrestling, Brazilian jiu-jitsu
- Fighting out of: Baguio
- Team: Evolve MMA, Synergy MMA, Tribe-Toro MMA, Marrok Force MMA
- Rank: Black belt in Brazilian jiu-jitsu
- Years active: 2009–present

Mixed martial arts record
- Total: 24
- Wins: 18
- Losses: 5
- No contests: 1

Other information
- Mixed martial arts record from Sherdog
- Last updated on: 2025
Medal record
Men's sambo
Representing Philippines
Southeast Asian Sambo Championships
Gold medal – first place	2023 Kuala Lumpur	Combat -79kg
Bronze medal – third place	2023 Kuala Lumpur	Sport -79kg
SEA Games
Gold medal – first place	2019 Philippines	Combat -74kg

Mark Edward Martinez Striegl (born June 23, 1988) is a Filipino-American professional mixed martial artist and sambist also known as Mugen. Fighting in the bantamweight and featherweight divisions, he has competed in the Ultimate Fighting Championship (UFC), ONE Championship, the Universal Reality Combat Championship (URCC) and the Pacific Xtreme Combat (PXC).

In 2019, Striegl won a gold medal in sambo in the 30th edition of the Southeast Asian Games in the Philippines.

== Early life and education ==
Mark Striegl was born on June 23, 1988 in Tokyo, Japan to his German-American father Frank Striegl Sr. from New York City, United States and Filipino mother Sonia Martinez Striegl from Calapan, Oriental Mindoro.

Mark and his older brother Frank Striegl Jr. grew up in Tokyo. After graduating from St. Mary's International School in Tokyo where their parents worked as teachers, Mark went to the University of San Diego in California, USA then transferred to Point Loma Nazarene University in San Diego.

== Mixed martial arts career ==
=== Early career ===
While in high school, Mark Striegl began his martial arts journey with wrestling. He later transitioned to aikido, taekwondo and Brazilian jiu-jitsu under the tutelage of his brother Frank Jr. It was Frank Jr. who suggested Mark's fight name Mugen, which is Japanese for "limitless" and a name of a character from the Japanese animated series Samurai Champloo.

From 2009 to 2012, Striegl was undefeated with 12 wins. He made his professional MMA debut in a Total Combat event in San Diego in 2009 and competed in Pacific Rim Organized Fighting in Taipei, Taiwan in 2010.

In 2011, Striegl competed in the URCC, Trench Warz, the Legend Fighting Championship and Pacific Rim Organized Fighting. In the same year, he relocated to Baguio City, Philippines.

In 2012, Striegl won six bouts, including two in the PXC. He had his first loss in the PXC in 2013 and earned one win in Malaysian Invasion MMA in 2014.

=== ONE Championship ===
In 2015, Striegl joined ONE Championship. That year, he defeated Casey Suire via rear-naked choke before losing to Reece McLaren also via rear-naked choke. Mark's third fight in the promotion ended in a unanimous decision victory against Sotir Kichukov in 2016.

=== URCC ===
In 2017, Striegl defeated two URCC opponents namely Andrew Benibe and Ki Sung Kim. In 2018, Mark became the new featherweight champion of the promotion after dethroning Do Gyeom Lee. When Mark defended the title against Shunichi Shimizu in 2019, the bout ended in a No Contest.

=== UFC ===
In August 2020, it was announced that Striegl had signed with the UFC. He was scheduled to make his promotional debut against Timur Valiev on August 22, 2020 at UFC on ESPN: Munhoz vs. Edgar. However, Mark tested positive for the new coronavirus (COVID-19) and was pulled from the event.

On October 18, 2020, Striegl made his UFC debut at UFC Fight Night: Ortega vs. The Korean Zombie and lost to Said Nurmagomedov via knockout. After going on hiatus in 2021, Mark returned to the cage on February 19, 2022 at UFC Fight Night 201 where he lost to Chas Skelly via technical knockout.

== Sambo career ==
Striegl competed in sambo at the 2019 SEA Games in the Philippines. He won against Ashvin Jaswant Singh of Singapore in the gold medal match of the 74 kg division final.

At the 2023 Southeast Asian Sambo Championships in Kuala Lumpur, Striegl won a gold in the combat sambo -79kgs division and a bronze in the -79kgs sport sambo division.

== Television ==
In 2023, Striegl was in the cast of the film Keys to the Heart, a Filipino adaptation of the 2018 South Korean comedy-drama film of the same name. In 2024, he was one of the celebrity guests of the second season of Running Man Philippines. In 2025, he and Manny Pacquiao were two of the six members of the Philippine team that competed in the Netflix reality competition series Physical: Asia, which was filmed in South Korea, and he appeared in a fight scene with Gerald Anderson in the ABS-CBN series Sins of the Father.

== Personal life ==
Mark Striegl is married to Starr Cabuco, a former varsity player for the Ateneo Lady Eagles who runs a school in Baguio. They have two children.

== Championships and accomplishments ==
- Universal Reality Combat Championship (URCC)
  - URCC Featherweight Championship (One time)

== Mixed martial arts record ==
Professional record breakdown
24 matches	18 wins	5 losses
By knockout	0	2
By submission	14	2
By decision	4	1
No contests	1	

Res.	Record	Opponent	Method	Event	Date	Round	Time	Location	Notes
Loss	18–5 (1)	Walter Cogliandro	Decision (unanimous)	UAE Warriors 39	March 18, 2023	3	5:00	Abu Dhabi, United Arab Emirates	Catchweight (150 lb) bout.
Loss	18–4 (1)	Chas Skelly	TKO (knee and punches)	UFC Fight Night: Walker vs. Hill	February 19, 2022	2	2:01	Las Vegas, Nevada, United States	
Loss	18–3 (1)	Said Nurmagomedov	KO (punches)	UFC Fight Night: Ortega vs. The Korean Zombie	October 17, 2020	1	0:51	Abu Dhabi, United Arab Emirates	Bantamweight bout.
NC	18–2 (1)	Shunichi Shimizu	NC (accidental knee to groin)	URCC 77	April 27, 2019	2	2:08	Parañaque, Philippines	Retained the URCC Featherweight Championship. Accidental knee to the groin rendered Shimizu unable to continue.
Win	18–2	Lee Do-gyeom	Technical Submission (ninja choke)	URCC: Colossal	September 29, 2018	1	1:44	Quezon City, Philippines	Won the URCC Featherweight Championship.
Win	17–2	Kim Ki-sung	Decision (unanimous)	URCC: Battle Extreme Tournament of Superstars 4	December 13, 2017	3	5:00	Lapu-Lapu City, Philippines	Return to Featherweight.
Win	16–2	Andrew Benibe	Submission (scarf hold armlock)	URCC 30	August 12, 2017	1	0:49	Quezon City, Philippines	Catchweight (149 lb) bout.
Win	15–2	Sotir Kichukov	Decision (unanimous)	ONE: Age of Domination	December 2, 2016	3	5:00	Pasay, Philippines	
Loss	14–2	Reece McLaren	Submission (rear-naked choke)	ONE: Spirit of Champions	December 11, 2015	3	3:33	Pasay, Philippines	
Win	14–1	Casey Suire	Submission (rear-naked choke)	ONE: Valor of Champions	April 24, 2015	1	3:48	Pasay, Philippines	
Win	13–1	Kai Kara-France	Submission (rear-naked choke)	Malaysian Invasion 2	October 25, 2014	1	2:10	Kuala Lumpur, Malaysia	Bantamweight debut.
Loss	12–1	Kim Jang-yong	Submission (leg scissor choke)	Pacific Xtreme Combat 39	September 14, 2013	3	4:13	Pasig, Philippines	
Win	12–0	Harris Sarmineto	Submission (scarf hold armlock)	Pacific Xtreme Combat 34	November 17, 2012	1	2:36	Quezon City, Philippines	
Win	11–0	Robert Wusstig	Submission (scarf hold armlock)	Pacific Xtreme Combat 33	September 1, 2012	1	1:38	Pasig, Philippines	
Win	10–0	Alcer Lozada	Submission (rear-naked choke)	URCC 21	April 28, 2012	1	3:24	Pasay, Philippines	
Win	9–0	Marko Huusansaari	Submission (armbar)	DARE Fight Sports: 2/12	March 17, 2012	2	1:17	Bangkok, Thailand	Catchweight (160 lb) bout.
Win	8–0	Mohd Al Hafiz	Technical Submission (triangle choke)	Malaysian FC 4	March 10, 2012	1	0:47	Kuala Lumpur, Malaysia	
Win	7–0	Ev Ting	Technical Submission (rear-naked choke)	Legend FC 7	February 11, 2012	1	3:51	Macau SAR, China	
Win	6–0	Pan Wen Shi	Submission (rear-naked choke)	PRO Fighting 6	December 18, 2011	1	3:15	Taipei, Taiwan	
Win	5–0	Yusuke Kawanago	Decision (split)	Legend FC 5	July 16, 2011	3	5:00	Macau SAR, China	
Win	4–0	Giovanni Sablan	Submission (rear-naked choke)	Trench Warz 14	June 17, 2011	1	3:15	Saipan, Northern Mariana Islands	
Win	3–0	Crisanto Pitpitunge	Submission (rear-naked choke)	URCC Baguio 3	February 19, 2011	1	5:37	Baguio, Philippines	
Win	2–0	Kwon Bae-yong	Decision (unanimous)	PRO Fighting 4	August 1, 2010	3	5:00	Taipei, Taiwan	
Win	1–0	Andy Jewett	submission (rear-naked choke)	Total Combat 34	July 25, 2009	2	1:17	San Diego, California, United States	Featherweight debut.

== Filmography ==
=== Television shows ===
Year	Title	Role	Notes	Ref.
2024	Running Man Philippines	Guest	S2, Ep 3 - 6	
2025	Physical: Asia	Contestant	Team Philippines	

== See also ==
- List of current UFC fighters
- List of male mixed martial artists
