= UFC Fight Night: Ortega vs. The Korean Zombie =

UFC mixed martial arts event in 2020

- The poster for UFC Fight Night: Ortega vs. The Korean Zombie
- Promotion: Ultimate Fighting Championship
- Date: October 18, 2020
- Venue: du Forum
- City: Abu Dhabi, United Arab Emirates
- Attendance: None (behind closed doors)

Event chronology
UFC Fight Night: Moraes vs. Sandhagen	UFC Fight Night: Ortega vs. The Korean Zombie	UFC 254: Khabib vs. Gaethje

UFC Fight Night: Ortega vs. The Korean Zombie (also known as UFC Fight Night 180, UFC on ESPN+ 38 and UFC Fight Island 6) was a mixed martial arts event produced by the Ultimate Fighting Championship that took place on October 18, 2020, at the du Forum on Yas Island, Abu Dhabi, United Arab Emirates.

== Background ==
Without fans in attendance, the promotion did not have to make consideration for the local timing of the event, so the plan was to proceed with normal timing for prime time hours on the east coast of North America. The main card was scheduled to begin at 3:00 am (October 18) local time in Abu Dhabi, with a full preliminary card beginning at approximately 12:00 am Gulf Standard Time.

A featherweight bout between former UFC Featherweight Championship challengers Brian Ortega and Chan Sung Jung served as the event headliner. The duo were previously scheduled to main event UFC Fight Night: Edgar vs. The Korean Zombie in December 2019. However, Ortega pulled out of the fight with a knee injury and was replaced by former UFC Lightweight Champion Frankie Edgar.

A women's flyweight bout between former UFC Women's Strawweight Champion Jéssica Andrade and former UFC Women's Flyweight Championship challenger Jessica Eye was briefly linked to the event. However, the pairing never materialized due to lingering injuries for Eye. Andrade faced another former flyweight title challenger in Katlyn Chookagian instead.

A heavyweight bout between Ciryl Gane and Shamil Abdurakhimov was expected to take place at this event. The pairing was originally scheduled for UFC 249, but Gane was forced to pull out of the event after he suffered a pneumothorax in training. Subsequently, the pairing was rescheduled and cancelled on three other occasions for various reasons. First at UFC 251, then briefly for UFC 253 and UFC Fight Night: Covington vs. Woodley. The bout fell through once again as Abdurakhimov pulled out due to undisclosed reasons on September 28 and Gane was expected to face promotional newcomer Ante Delija. However, that bout was also cancelled on October 14 due to contractual issues with Delija, seemingly related to his previous deal with the PFL.

A lightweight bout between Renato Moicano and Magomed Mustafaev was scheduled for the event, but Moicano withdrew on September 15 for personal reasons. He was replaced by former KSW Featherweight and Lightweight Champion Mateusz Gamrot. In turn, Mustafaev pulled out in early October due to undisclosed reasons. Gamrot faced fellow promotional newcomer Guram Kutateladze instead.

A light heavyweight bout between former UFC Light Heavyweight Championship challenger Volkan Oezdemir and Nikita Krylov was briefly linked to the event. However, Oezdemir pulled out of the fight in early October citing a knee injury. A replacement could not be found and Krylov was removed from the card.

Muslim Salikhov was expected to face Cláudio Silva in a welterweight bout at the event. However, it was announced on October 4 that Salikhov pulled out due to undisclosed reasons and was replaced by James Krause.

A middleweight bout between Krzysztof Jotko and Makhmud Muradov was briefly scheduled to take place at this event, before being moved two weeks later to UFC Fight Night: Hall vs. Silva.

Mounir Lazzez was expected to face David Zawada in a welterweight bout at the event. However, it was reported on October 6 that Lazzez tested positive for COVID-19 and would not compete. In turn, Zawada was removed from the card.

== Results ==
Main card (ESPN+)
Weight class				Method	Round	Time	Notes
Featherweight	Brian Ortega	def.	Chan Sung Jung	Decision (unanimous) (50–45, 50–45, 50–45)	5	5:00
Women’s Flyweight	Jéssica Andrade	def.	Katlyn Chookagian	TKO (body punches)	1	4:57
Light Heavyweight	Jimmy Crute	def.	Modestas Bukauskas	KO (punches)	1	2:01
Welterweight	James Krause	def.	Cláudio Silva	Decision (unanimous) (30–27, 30–27, 30–27)	3	5:00
Featherweight	Jonathan Martinez	def.	Thomas Almeida	Decision (unanimous) (30–27, 30–27, 30–27)	3	5:00
Preliminary card (ESPN+)
Lightweight	Guram Kutateladze	def.	Mateusz Gamrot	Decision (split) (29–28, 28–29, 29–28)	3	5:00
Women's Flyweight	Gillian Robertson	def.	Poliana Botelho	Decision (unanimous) (29–28, 29–27, 29–27)	3	5:00
Middleweight	Jun Yong Park	def.	John Phillips	Decision (unanimous) (30–25, 30–25, 30–25)	3	5:00
Lightweight	Farès Ziam	def.	Jamie Mullarkey	Decision (unanimous) (29–28, 29–28, 29–28)	3	5:00
Light Heavyweight	Maxim Grishin	def.	Gadzhimurad Antigulov	TKO (punches)	2	4:58
Bantamweight	Said Nurmagomedov	def.	Mark Striegl	KO (punches)	1	0:51

== Bonus awards ==
The following fighters received $50,000 bonuses.

- Fight of the Night: Guram Kutateladze vs. Mateusz Gamrot
- Performance of the Night: Jéssica Andrade and Jimmy Crute

== See also ==
- List of UFC events
- List of current UFC fighters
- 2020 in UFC
