= Said Nurmagomedov =

Russian mixed martial artist (born 1992)

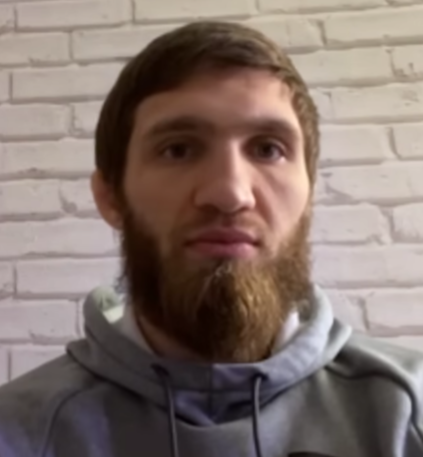
- Nurmagomedov in 2022
- Born: Said Makhachevich Nurmagomedov; April 5, 1992 (age 34); Makhachkala, Dagestan, Russia
- Native name: Саид Нурмагомедов
- Height: 5 ft 8 in (173 cm)
- Weight: 135 lb (61 kg; 9 st 9 lb)
- Division: Featherweight (2009–2013); Bantamweight (2014–present); Flyweight (2018)
- Reach: 70 in (178 cm)
- Fighting out of: Makhachkala, Dagestan, Russia
- Team: DagFighter; Fight Club Akhmat
- Rank: International Master of Sport in amateur MMA
- Years active: 2009–present

Mixed martial arts record
- Total: 23
- Wins: 18
- By knockout: 4
- By submission: 6
- By decision: 8
- Losses: 5
- By decision: 5

Other information
- Mixed martial arts record from Sherdog

Said Makhachevich Nurmagomedov (Russian: Саид Махачевич Нурмагомедов; born April 5, 1992) is a Russian professional mixed martial artist who currently competes in the Bantamweight division of the Ultimate Fighting Championship (UFC). A professional since 2009, he formerly competed for Absolute Championship Berkut and World Fighting Championship Akhmat. He is a former AFC Bantamweight Champion.

== Mixed martial arts career ==
=== Early career ===
Said Nurmagomedov made his professional MMA debut in 2009 at World Ultimate Full Contact 15, facing the undefeated 4–0 Oscar Nave. He won the bout in the first round by way of an armbar. After a three-year break, he returned in 2012 at Vale Tudo 3 to fight the debuting Jolon Uulu Jayloobay. Nurmagomedov won the fight in the first round by way of an armbar. Nurmagomedov returned in 2013 to welcome another debutante, Akhmed Sarapov, at Liga Kavkaz - Battle in Khiv 1. Nurmagomedov scored the first KO win of his career, ending the fight in the dying seconds of the first round.

In 2014 Nurmagomedov signed with Absolute Championship Berkut, with his first fight being against the experienced Asulan Toktarbaev, at ACB 1 bantamweight Grand Prix. Nurmagomedov won a unanimous decision. In the next round of the bantamweight Grand Prix, at ACB 4 he faced Magomed-Emin Khazhgeriev, again winning by a unanimous decision. In the penultimate bout of the Grand Prix, at ACB 7, he fought against the undefeated German Barsegyan. He won by TKO, after the doctor stopped the fight in the first round. In the final of the Grand Prix, Nurmagomedov faced the undefeated Magomed Bibulatov, losing the final by a unanimous decision.

He would then move to World Fighting Championship Akhmat two years later, with his first fight being against the veteran Diego Marlon, winning a unanimous decision. At WFCA 22 he would face Walter Pereira Jr, winning a unanimous decision. He fought against Abdul-Rakhman Dudaev during WFA 30 for the vacant AFC Bantamweight Championship. Nurmagomedov won a unanimous decision to become the AFC bantamweight champion. During WFCA 35 he fought Anderson dos Santos. Following several jumping knees in the clinch, Said ended the fight by submission in the first round. In his final fight with World Fighting Championship Akhmat he won a unanimous decision against Luis Nogueira at WFC 42.

=== Ultimate Fighting Championship ===
Nurmagomedov made his promotional debut on July 14, 2018, at UFC Fight Night 133 against Justin Scoggins. He won the fight via split decision.

Nurmagomedov next faced Ricardo Ramos on February 2, 2019, at UFC Fight Night 144. He won the fight via TKO in the first round.

Nurmagomedov faced Raoni Barcelos on December 21, 2019, at UFC Fight Night 165. He lost the fight via unanimous decision.

Nurmagomedov faced promotional newcomer Mark Striegl, whose debut was delayed after testing positive for COVID-19, on October 18, 2020, at UFC Fight Night 180. He won the fight via knockout in round one.

Nurmagomedov was scheduled to face Jack Shore at UFC Fight Night 191 However, Nurmagomedov was pulled from the event due to visa issues, and was replaced by Zviad Lazishvili.

Nurmagomedov faced Cody Stamann on January 22, 2022, at UFC 270. He won the fight via submission in round one. This win earned him the Performance of the Night award.

Nurmagomedov faced Douglas Silva de Andrade on July 9, 2022, at UFC on ESPN 39. He won the fight via unanimous decision.

Nurmagomedov faced Saidyokub Kakhramonov on December 17, 2022, at UFC Fight Night 216. He won the fight via submission in round two.

Nurmagomedov faced Jonathan Martinez on March 11, 2023, at UFC Fight Night 221. He lost the fight via unanimous decision. 13 out of 17 media outlets scored the bout as a victory for Nurmagomedov.

Nurmagomedov was scheduled to face Kyler Phillips on August 5, 2023, at UFC on ESPN 50. However, he withdrew for unknown reasons and was replaced by Raoni Barcelos.

Nurmagomedov faced Muin Gafurov on October 21, 2023, at UFC 294. He won the bout by guillotine choke submission in the first round. This fight earned him the Performance of the Night award.

Nurmagomedov was scheduled to face Montel Jackson on June 22, 2024, at UFC on ABC 6. However, Nurmagomedov withdrew from the bout for unknown reasons and was replaced by Farid Basharat.

Nurmagomedov was scheduled to face Daniel Santos on October 26, 2024, at UFC 308. However, one week before the event, Santos withdrew from the fight for unknown reasons and the bout was subsequently cancelled.

Nurmagomedov was scheduled to face Daniel Marcos on December 14, 2024, at UFC on ESPN 63. However, Nurmagomedov withdrew from the fight for unknown reasons and was replaced by Adrian Yañez.

Nurmagomedov faced Vinicius Oliveira on February 1, 2025 at UFC Fight Night 250. He lost the fight by unanimous decision. This fight earned him his first Fight of the Night award.

Nurmagomedov faced Bryce Mitchell on July 26, 2025 at UFC on ABC 9. He lost the fight by unanimous decision.

Nurmagomedov was scheduled to face Javid Basharat on February 7, 2026 at UFC Fight Night 266. However, Nurmagomedov was forced to pull out due to visa issues and was replaced by promotional newcomer Gianni Vazquez on 2 days notice.

== Championships and achievements ==
- Ultimate Fighting Championship
  - Fight of the Night (One time) vs. Vinicius Oliveira
  - Performance of the Night (Two times) vs. Cody Stamann & Muin Gafurov
  - UFC.com Awards
    - 2022: Ranked #10 Submission of the Year vs. Cody Stamann
- World Fighting Championship Akhmat
  - World Fighting Championship Akhmat Bantamweight Championship (One time)
- MMAjunkie.com
  - January 2022 Submission of the Month (vs. Cody Stamann)

== Mixed martial arts record ==
Professional record breakdown
23 matches	18 wins	5 losses
By knockout	4	0
By submission	6	0
By decision	8	5

Res.	Record	Opponent	Method	Event	Date	Round	Time	Location	Notes
Loss	18–5	Bryce Mitchell	Decision (unanimous)	UFC on ABC: Whittaker vs. de Ridder	July 26, 2025	3	5:00	Abu Dhabi, United Arab Emirates	
Loss	18–4	Vinicius Oliveira	Decision (unanimous)	UFC Fight Night: Adesanya vs. Imavov	February 1, 2025	3	5:00	Riyadh, Saudi Arabia	Fight of the Night.
Win	18–3	Muin Gafurov	Submission (guillotine choke)	UFC 294	October 21, 2023	1	1:13	Abu Dhabi, United Arab Emirates	Performance of the Night.
Loss	17–3	Jonathan Martinez	Decision (unanimous)	UFC Fight Night: Yan vs. Dvalishvili	March 11, 2023	3	5:00	Las Vegas, Nevada, United States	
Win	17–2	Saidyokub Kakhramonov	Submission (ninja choke)	UFC Fight Night: Cannonier vs. Strickland	December 17, 2022	2	3:50	Las Vegas, Nevada, United States	
Win	16–2	Douglas Silva de Andrade	Decision (unanimous)	UFC on ESPN: dos Anjos vs. Fiziev	July 9, 2022	3	5:00	Las Vegas, Nevada, United States	
Win	15–2	Cody Stamann	Submission (guillotine choke)	UFC 270	January 22, 2022	1	0:47	Anaheim, California, United States	Performance of the Night.
Win	14–2	Mark Striegl	KO (punches)	UFC Fight Night: Ortega vs. The Korean Zombie	October 18, 2020	1	0:51	Abu Dhabi, United Arab Emirates	
Loss	13–2	Raoni Barcelos	Decision (unanimous)	UFC Fight Night: Edgar vs. The Korean Zombie	December 21, 2019	3	5:00	Busan, South Korea	
Win	13–1	Ricardo Ramos	TKO (spinning back kick and punches)	UFC Fight Night: Assunção vs. Moraes 2	February 2, 2019	1	2:28	Fortaleza, Brazil	Return to Bantamweight.
Win	12–1	Justin Scoggins	Decision (split)	UFC Fight Night: dos Santos vs. Ivanov	July 14, 2018	3	5:00	Boise, Idaho, United States	Flyweight debut.
Win	11–1	Luis Nogueira	Decision (unanimous)	WFCA 42	September 27, 2017	3	5:00	Moscow, Russia	
Win	10–1	Anderson dos Santos	Submission (guillotine choke)	WFCA 35	April 1, 2017	1	1:52	Astana, Kazakhstan	
Win	9–1	Abdul-Rakhman Dudaev	Decision (unanimous)	WFCA 30	October 4, 2016	5	5:00	Grozny, Russia	Won the vacant AFC Bantamweight Championship.
Win	8–1	Walter Pereira Jr.	Decision (unanimous)	WFCA 22	May 22, 2016	3	5:00	Grozny, Russia	
Win	7–1	Diego Marlon	Decision (unanimous)	WFCA 16	May 12, 2016	3	5:00	Grozny, Russia	
Loss	6–1	Magomed Bibulatov	Decision (unanimous)	ACB 9	June 22, 2014	3	5:00	Grozny, Russia	2014 ACB Bantamweight Grand Prix Final.
Win	6–0	German Barsegyan	TKO (doctor stoppage)	ACB 7	May 18, 2014	1	1:50	Grozny, Russia	2014 ACB Bantamweight Grand Prix Semifinal.
Win	5–0	Magomed-Emin Hazhgeriev	Decision (unanimous)	ACB 4	March 30, 2014	2	5:00	Grozny, Russia	2014 ACB Bantamweight Grand Prix Quarterfinal.
Win	4–0	Aslan Toktarbaev	Decision (unanimous)	ACB 1	March 2, 2014	2	5:00	Grozny, Russia	Bantamweight debut. 2014 ACB Bantamweight Grand Prix Round of 16.
Win	3–0	Akhmed Sarapov	KO (punch)	Liga Kavkaz: Battle in Khiv 1	August 15, 2013	1	4:40	Khiv, Russia	
Win	2–0	Jolon Uulu Jayloobay	Submission (armbar)	Vale Tudo Russia 3	May 12, 2013	1	1:35	Moscow, Russia	
Win	1–0	Oscar Nave	Submission (armbar)	World Ultimate Full Contact 15	August 22, 2009	1	2:03	Viseu, Portugal	Featherweight debut.

== See also ==
- List of male mixed martial artists
- List of current UFC fighters
