= Gadzhimurad Antigulov =

Russian mixed martial arts fighter

- Born: 1 January 1987 (age 39); Anapa, Russian SFSR, Soviet Union
- Nationality: Russian
- Height: 5 ft 11 in (1.80 m)
- Weight: 205 lb (93 kg; 14 st 9 lb)
- Division: Heavyweight; Light Heavyweight
- Reach: 70 in (178 cm)
- Fighting out of: Makhachkala, Russia
- Team: Gorets; American Top Team
- Rank: Master of Sports in Wrestling
- Years active: 2009–present

Mixed martial arts record
- Total: 32
- Wins: 21
- By knockout: 5
- By submission: 15
- By decision: 1
- Losses: 11
- By knockout: 8
- By submission: 3

Other information
- Mixed martial arts record from Sherdog

Gadzhimurad Antigulov (born 1 January 1987) is a Russian mixed martial artist who currently competing in the light heavyweight division. A professional since 2009, he has fought for the Ultimate Fighting Championship (UFC), M-1 Global, and Absolute Championship Berkut, where he was a two-time light heavyweight champion.

== Background ==
As wrestling is the national sport in Dagestan, Antigulov started training wrestling at the young age and transitioned to MMA when the sport was introduced to his country.

He splits his training into two sessions per day. He starts with a run and then focuses on striking skills and wrestling on the second part of the morning training. A second training session will follow later of the day after a rest during the early afternoon. He also train with American Top team for his fights.

== Mixed martial arts career ==
=== Early career ===
Antigulov fought in the Russian circuit for 9 years, and he was the two times light heavyweight champion for Absolute Championship Berkut. He amassed a record of 18-4 prior joining UFC.

=== Ultimate Fighting Championship ===
Antigulov made his promotional debut on November 19, 2016, at UFC Fight Night: Bader vs. Nogueira 2 against Marcos Rogério de Lima. He took his first UFC win via a guillotine choke on 67 seconds into round one. He earned the Performance of the Night bonus.

Antigulov was expected to face Ed Herman at UFC 209 on March 4, 2017. The bout was removed due to Herman citing injury.

On May 13, 2017, Antigulov faced Joachim Christensen at UFC 211. He won the fight via a rear-naked choke in the first round.

Antigulov was scheduled to face Ion Cuțelaba on November 4, 2017, at UFC 217. However, Antigulov pulled out of the fight on September 26 citing an injury, and was replaced by newcomer Michał Oleksiejczuk.

Antigulov was expected to face Aleksandar Rakić on February 24, 2018, at UFC on Fox 28. However, it was reported on February 7, 2018, that Antigulov was pulled from the fight, citing injury, as a result, the bout was cancelled.

The bout with Ion Cuțelaba eventually took place on July 28, 2018, at UFC on Fox 30. Antigulov lost the fight via TKO in the first round.

Antigulov was reported to face Sam Alvey on February 23, 2019, at UFC Fight Night 145. However, on January 25, 2019, it was reported that Alvey would face Jim Crute at UFC 234 instead.

Antigulov was briefly linked to a bout to face newcomer Roman Dolidze on April 20, 2019, at UFC Fight Night 149. However, Dolidze was replaced just days later for undisclosed reasons by Michał Oleksiejczuk. Antigulov lost the fight via knockout in the first round.

Antigulov was expected to face Ed Herman on November 9, 2019, at UFC Fight Night 163. However, on October 29, 2019, it was reported that he was pulled from the bout for undisclosed reason.

Antigulov was scheduled to face Devin Clark on February 15, 2020, at UFC Fight Night 167. However, Antigulov was pulled from the event for undisclosed reason and he was replaced by Dequan Townsend.

Antigulov was scheduled to face Klidson Abreu on June 13, 2020, at UFC Kazakhstan. However, the event for Kazakhstan was later cancelled due to the COVID-19 pandemic.

Antigulov faced Paul Craig on July 26, 2020, at UFC on ESPN 14. He lost the fight via a triangle choke in round one.

Antigulov faced Maxim Grishin on October 18, 2020 at UFC Fight Night 180. He lost the fight via technical knockout in round two.

On December 8, 2020, it was announced that the UFC had released him.

=== Post-UFC career ===
As the first bout after the release Antigulov faced Vitor Petrino at UAE Warriors 22 on September 4, 2021. He lost the fight via second-round technical knockout.

Antigulov faced Viktor Vecherin on March 25, 2022, at AMC Fight Nights 110. He won the bout via second-round TKO victory.

Antigulov faced Evgeny Erokhin on November 3, 2023 at ACA 165, losing the bout via TKO stoppage in the second round.

== Championships and accomplishments ==
=== Mixed martial arts ===
- Absolute Championship Berkut (ACB)
  - ACB Light Heavyweight Championship (Two times) vs. Ruslan Khaskhanov and Muslim Makhmudov
    - One successful title defense
- Ultimate Fighting Championship
  - Performance of the Night (One times) vs. Marcos Rogério de Lima

== Mixed martial arts record ==
Professional record breakdown
31 matches	20 wins	11 losses
By knockout	5	8
By submission	14	3
By decision	1	0

Res.	Record	Opponent	Method	Event	Date	Round	Time	Location	Notes
Loss	20–11	Ivan Shtyrkov	TKO (punches)	RCC 19	May 11, 2024	1	2:14	Yekaterinburg, Russia	
Loss	20–10	Evgeny Erokhin	TKO (punches)	ACA 165	November 3, 2023	2	0:47	Saint Petersburg, Russia	
Win	20–9	Viktor Vecherin	TKO (punches)	AMC Fight Nights 110	March 25, 2022	2	2:39	Astrakhan, Russia	
Loss	19–9	Vitor Petrino	KO (punches)	UAE Warriors 22	September 4, 2021	2	3:36	Abu Dhabi, United Arab Emirates	
Loss	19–8	Maxim Grishin	TKO (punches)	UFC Fight Night: Ortega vs. The Korean Zombie	October 17, 2020	2	4:57	Abu Dhabi, United Arab Emirates	
Loss	19–7	Paul Craig	Submission (triangle choke)	UFC on ESPN: Whittaker vs. Till	July 26, 2020	1	2:06	Abu Dhabi, United Arab Emirates	
Loss	19–6	Michał Oleksiejczuk	KO (punch)	UFC Fight Night: Overeem vs. Oleinik	April 20, 2019	1	0:44	Saint Petersburg, Russia	
Loss	19–5	Ion Cuțelaba	TKO (punches and elbows)	UFC on Fox: Alvarez vs. Poirier 2	July 28, 2018	1	4:25	Calgary, Alberta, Canada	
Win	19–4	Joachim Christensen	Submission (rear-naked choke)	UFC 211	May 13, 2017	1	2:21	Dallas, Texas, United States	
Win	18–4	Marcos Rogério de Lima	Submission (guillotine choke)	UFC Fight Night: Bader vs. Nogueira 2	November 19, 2016	1	1:07	São Paulo, Brazil	Performance of the Night.
Win	17–4	Muslim Makhmudov	Submission (rear-naked choke)	ACB 35	May 6, 2016	2	4:21	Tbilisi, Georgia	Defended the ACB Light Heavyweight Championship.
Win	16–4	Jorge Luis Bezerra	TKO (punches)	ACB 27	December 20, 2015	1	2:00	Dushanbe, Tajikistan	Non-title bout.
Win	15–4	Cassio Barbosa de Oliveira	TKO (punches)	ACB 20	June 14, 2015	1	0:12	Sochi, Russia	Non-title bout.
Win	14–4	Artur Astakhov	Submission (rear-naked choke)	Union MMA Pro 2015	February 21, 2015	1	0:33	Krasnodar, Russia	
Win	13–4	Hracho Darpinyan	Decision (unanimous)	ACB 11: Day 2	November 15, 2014	3	5:00	Grozny, Russia	Non-title bout; Darpinyan missed weight (207 lb).
Win	12–4	Ruslan Khaskhanov	TKO (punches)	ACB 9	June 22, 2014	1	3:53	Grozny, Russia	Won the 2014 ACB Light Heavyweight Grand Prix and the inaugural ACB Light Heavyweight Championship.
Win	11–4	Nikolai Boyarczuk	Submission (guillotine choke)	ACB 7	May 18, 2014	1	0:42	Grozny, Russia	2014 ACB Light Heavyweight Grand Prix Semifinal.
Win	10–4	Mikhail Bureshkin	Submission (rear-naked choke)	ACB 6	April 20, 2014	1	1:47	Grozny, Russia	2014 ACB Light Heavyweight Grand Prix Quarterfinal.
Win	9–4	Ilya Kolodyazhny	TKO (punches)	ACB 3	March 16, 2014	1	0:47	Grozny, Russia	2014 ACB Light Heavyweight Grand Prix Round of 16.
Win	8–4	Roman Ishchenko	Submission (anaconda choke)	Oplot Challenge 96	January 18, 2014	1	1:25	Kharkov, Ukraine	
Win	7–4	Muslim Tutaev	Submission (armbar)	Versia FC 2	December 31, 2013	1	0:35	Pyatigorsk, Russia	
Win	6–4	Magomed Sharudinov	Submission (kneebar)	Versia FC 2	December 31, 2013	1	2:24	Pyatigorsk, Russia	
Loss	5–4	Reinaldo da Silva	Submission (armbar)	Legion Fight 14	April 27, 2013	1	2:55	Taganrog, Russia	
Loss	5–3	Viktor Nemkov	Submission (guillotine choke)	M-1 Challenge 36	December 8, 2012	1	1:30	Mytishchi, Russia	
Loss	5–2	Abdul-Kerim Edilov	TKO (punches)	Dictator FC 1	June 28, 2012	1	2:28	Moscow, Russia	
Win	5–1	Jevgenij Lapin	Submission (armbar)	ProFC 35	October 7, 2011	1	1:45	Rostov-on-Don, Russia	Return to Light Heavyweight. 2011 ProFC Light Heavyweight Grand Prix Semifinal.
Win	4–1	Igor Savelyev	Submission (guillotine choke)	Boets Cup 2011	August 12, 2011	1	0:58	Sochi, Russia	Won the Boets Cup Heavyweight Tournament.
Win	3–1	Artur Korchemny	Submission (armbar)	Boets Cup 2011	August 12, 2011	1	0:42	Sochi, Russia	Boets Cup Heavyweight Tournament Semifinal.
Win	2–1	Igor Sliusarchuk	Submission (armbar)	Boets Cup 2011	August 12, 2011	1	0:25	Sochi, Russia	Return to Heavyweight. Boets Cup Heavyweight Tournament Quarterfinal.
Win	1–1	Sergey Filimonov	Submission (guillotine choke)	M-1 Selection 2011: European Tournament	April 1, 2011	2	0:51	Makhachkala, Russia	Light Heavyweight debut.
Loss	0–1	Adlan Amagov	KO (punches)	ProFC 9	September 25, 2009	1	4:05	Rostov-on-Don, Russia	Heavyweight debut.

== See also ==
- List of male mixed martial artists
- Absolute Championship Berkut
