= Ibragim Chuzhigaev =

Russian mixed martial artist (born 1991)

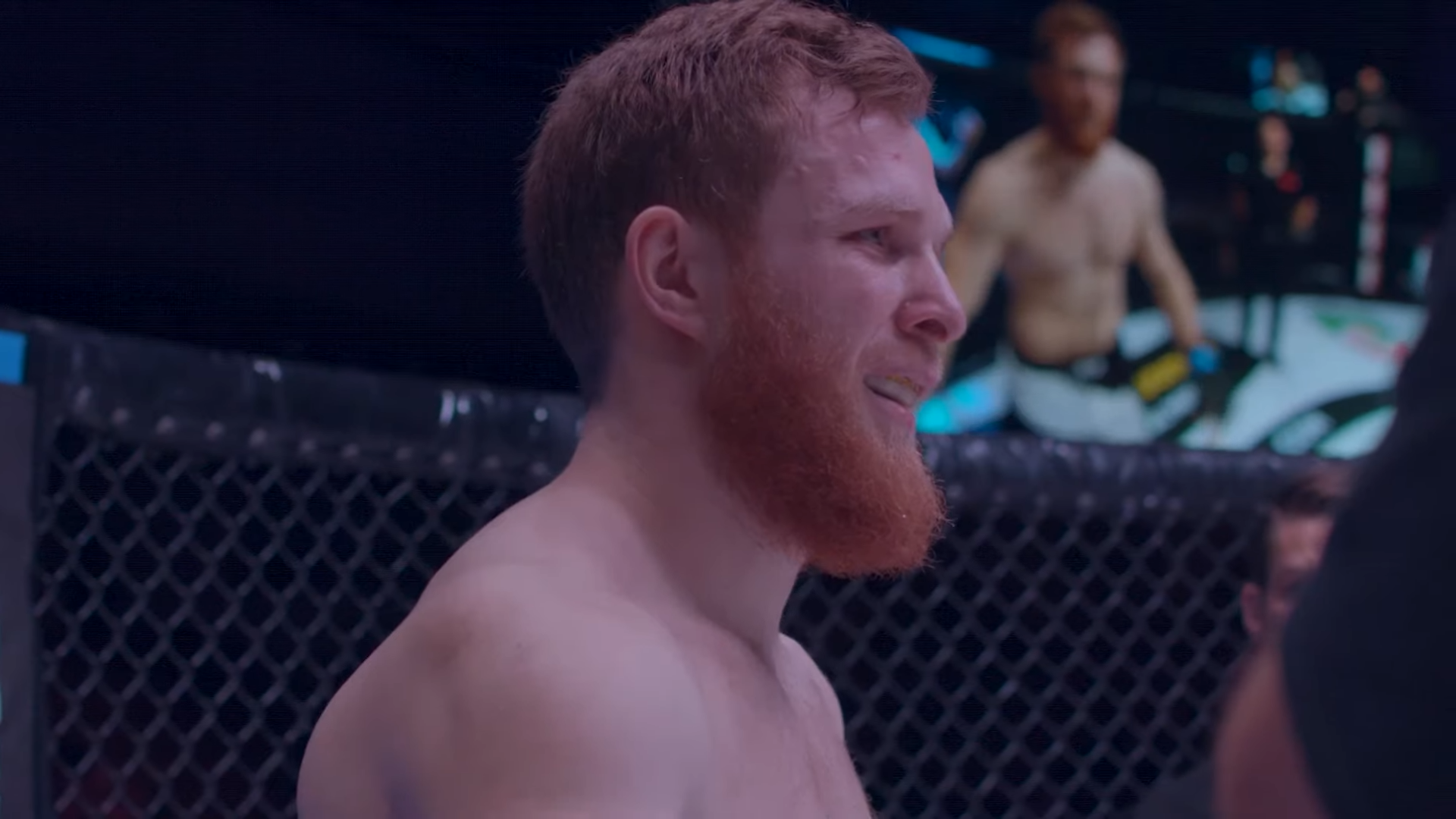
- Born: Ibragim Sumanovich Chuzhigaev; July 16, 1991 (age 35); Kemerovo, Russia
- Native name: Ибрагим Суманович Чужигаев
- Other names: The Million First
- Nationality: Russian, Turkish
- Height: 6 ft 0 in (1.83 m)
- Weight: 205 lb (93 kg; 14 st 9 lb)
- Division: Middleweight (2012, 2014–2019); Light Heavyweight (2012–2013, 2021–present); Heavyweight (2024)
- Reach: 74 in (188 cm)
- Style: Pankration, Sambo, Boxing
- Stance: Orthodox
- Fighting out of: Grozny, Russia
- Team: Berkut FC
- Years active: 2012–present

Mixed martial arts record
- Total: 27
- Wins: 19
- By knockout: 8
- By submission: 4
- By decision: 7
- Losses: 7
- By knockout: 2
- By submission: 2
- By decision: 3
- No contests: 1

Other information
- Mixed martial arts record from Sherdog

Ibragim Sumanovich Chuzhigaev (Russian: Ибрагим Суманович Чужигаев) is a Russian-Turkish professional mixed martial artist. He currently competes in the Light Heavyweight division for the Konfrontacja Sztuk Walki (KSW). Chuzhigaev is a former KSW Light Heavyweight champion.

== Professional career ==
=== Early career ===
Chuzhigaev made his professional debut on March 31, 2012 against Rasul Magomedov. Chuzhigaev won the fight via a first-round TKO.

His next fight came a month later, against Vasily Feyzrakhmanov. Chuzhigaev lost the fight via a first-round submission.

He returned after over a year out, when he fought Albert Ismailov. Chuzhigaev won the fight via a first-round TKO.

He fought three months later against Sergey Bobrov. Chuzhigaev lost the fight via Unanimous Decision.

=== Absolute Championship Berkut/Akhmat ===
Chuzhigaev had his first fight with Absolute Championship Berkut on March 16, 2014 in the ACB Berkut Cup 2014. He faced Kazakhstan's Igor Svirid. Chuzhigaev would lose the fight via Split Decision.

After going 3–1 in his next four fights, he faced Mirlan Tilekbaev on December 27, 2015. Chuzhigaev won the fight via a second-round submission, and earned himself a Performance of the Night bonus.

After going 4–1 in his next five fights, he faced Igor Svirid in a rematch. This time, Chuzhigaev won the fight via a Unanimous Decision.

His next fight came three months later, against United States's Mike Rhodes. Chuzhigaev won the fight via Unanimous Decision.

After a nine month layoff, Chuzhigaev returned in a bout against Poland's Piotr Strus. Chuzhigaev won the fight via Unanimous Decision.

After a seven month layoff, Chuzhigaev returned against Dominican Republic's Alex Garcia. Chuzhigaev won the fight via a first-round TKO.

=== AMC Fight Nights ===
After two years out the cage, Chuzhigaev returned on September 18, 2021 under AMC Fight Nights. He faced Evgeny Myakinkin, whom he'd beat via third-round TKO.

=== Konfrontacja Sztuk Walki ===
Four months later, Chuzhigaev faced Tomasz Narkun for the KSW Light Heavyweight championship. Chuzhigaev won the fight via Unanimous Decision, and thus claiming the Light Heavyweight title, and earning himself a Fight of the Night bonus.

His first title defense came eleven months later, against Croatia's Ivan Erslan. Chuzhigaev successfully defended his title via Unanimous Decision, and earned himself his second Fight of the Night bonus.

His next title defense came six months later, against Ukraine's Bohdan Gnidko. Chuzhigaev successfully defended his title via a second-round submission. This performance earned him a Submission of the Night bonus.

In December, 2023, Chuzhigaev vacated his title, after announcing his departure from the promotion.

=== Professional Fighters League ===
Chuzhigaev was scheduled to face Sweden's Karl Albrektsson in his PFL debut on June 21, 2024. This fight, however, would never happen as Chuzhigaev dropped out due to failing to obtain a visa. Chuzhigaev would never end up fighting in the promotion.

=== Return to AMC Fight Nights ===
On August 23, 2024, Chuzhigaev returned to AMC Fight Nights in a bout against Iran's Hosein Helali. Chuzhigaev won the fight via a first-round submission.

=== Return to Konfrontacja Sztuk Walki ===
Chuzhigaev was scheduled to make his KSW return on April 26, 2025 against Rafał Haratyk for the KSW Light Heavyweight championship. This fight was cancelled due to Haratyk suffering an eye injury.

His return bout came on July 19, 2025 against Marcin Wójcik. Chuzhigaev lost the fight via a second-round TKO, and thus ending a 10-fight win streak.

His next fight came on January 17, 2026, against Maciej Różański. Różański was stepping in on short notice, after Chuzhigaev's original opponent, Sergiusz Zając withdrew due to injury. The bout ended in a No Contest (NC) after Chuzhigaev unintentionally eye poked Różański, which rendered him unable to continue.

His next fight came on July 18, 2026, in a rematch against Maciej Różański. Chuzhigaev lost the fight via a second-round TKO.

== Championships and accomplishments ==
=== Mixed martial arts ===
==== Konfrontacja Sztuk Walki ====
- KSW Light Heavyweight championship (One time; former)
  - Two successful title defenses
- Fight of the Night (Two times)
- Submission of the Night (One time)

==== Absolute Championship Berkut ====
- Performance of the Night (One time)
- Knockout of the Night (One time)

== Mixed martial arts record ==
Professional record breakdown
27 matches	19 wins	7 losses
By knockout	8	2
By submission	4	2
By decision	7	3
No contests	1	

Res.	Record	Opponent	Method	Event	Date	Round	Time	Location	Notes
Loss	19–7 (1)	Maciej Różański	TKO (punches)	KSW 120	July 18, 2026	2	3:59	Gdynia, Poland	
NC	19–6 (1)	Maciej Różański	NC (accidental eye poke)	KSW 114	January 17, 2026	2	1:35	Radom, Poland	Catchweight (212 lb) bout. Accidental eye poke rendered Różański unable to continue.
Loss	19–6	Marcin Wójcik	TKO (punches)	KSW 108	July 19, 2025	2	4:20	Olsztyn, Poland	Return to Light Heavyweight.
Win	19–5	Hosein Helali	Submission (guillotine choke)	AMC Fight Nights 124	August 23, 2024	1	2:30	Yerevan, Armenia	Heavyweight debut.
Win	18–5	Bohdan Gnidko	Submission (arm-triangle choke)	KSW 85	August 19, 2023	2	4:14	Nowy Sącz, Poland	Defended the KSW Light Heavyweight championship. Submission of the Night.
Win	17–5	Ivan Erslan	Decision (unanimous)	KSW 77	December 17, 2022	5	5:00	Gliwice, Poland	Defended the KSW Light Heavyweight championship. Fight of the Night.
Win	16–5	Tomasz Narkun	Decision (unanimous)	KSW 66	January 15, 2022	5	5:00	Szczecin, Poland	Won the KSW Light Heavyweight championship. Fight of the Night.
Win	15–5	Evgeny Myakinkin	TKO (punches)	AMC Fight Nights: Abdulmanap Nurmagomedov Memory Tournament	September 17, 2021	3	2:47	Moscow, Russia	Return to Light Heavyweight.
Win	14–5	Alex Garcia	TKO (punches)	ACA 99	September 27, 2019	1	1:50	Moscow, Russia	
Win	13–5	Piotr Strus	Decision (split)	ACA 92	February 16, 2019	3	5:00	Warsaw, Poland	Catchweight (190.5 lb) bout; Chuzhigaev missed weight.
Win	12–5	Mike Rhodes	Decision (unanimous)	ACB 87	May 19, 2018	3	5:00	Nottingham, England	
Win	11–5	Igor Svirid	Decision (unanimous)	ACB 80	February 16, 2018	3	5:00	Krasnodar, Russia	
Win	10–5	Will Noland	KO (head kick and punches)	ACB 70	September 23, 2017	1	1:32	Sheffield, England	Catchweight (190 lb) bout. Knockout of the Night.
Loss	9–5	Vyacheslav Vasilevsky	Submission (rear-naked choke)	ACB 57	April 15, 2017	2	3:20	Moscow, Russia	
Win	9–4	David Mitchell	TKO (punches)	ACB 54	March 11, 2017	3	0:45	Manchester, England	
Win	8–4	Lee Chadwick	TKO (punches)	ACB 47	October 1, 2016	1	1:21	Glasgow, Scotland	
Win	7–4	Vadim Orischak	Submission (arm-triangle choke)	ACB 34	April 29, 2016	1	2:33	Grozny, Russia	
Win	6–4	Mirlan Tilekbaev	Submission (arm-triangle choke)	ACB 28	December 27, 2015	2	3:23	Nalchik, Russia	Performance of the Night.
Win	5–4	Artem Shokalo	Decision (unanimous)	ACB 21	August 29, 2015	3	5:00	Grozny, Russia	
Loss	4–4	Ibragim Tibilov	Decision (unanimous)	ACB 11	November 15, 2014	3	5:00	Grozny, Russia	2014 ACB Middleweight Grand Prix Quarterfinal.
Win	4–3	Charles Andrade	KO (punch)	ACB 10	October 4, 2014	1	0:05	Grozny, Russia	
Win	3–3	Richard Totrov	Decision (unanimous)	ACB 8	May 25, 2014	2	5:00	Grozny, Russia	
Loss	2–3	Igor Svirid	Decision (split)	ACB 3	March 16, 2014	2	5:00	Grozny, Russia	Return to Middleweight. 2014 Berkut Cup Middleweight Grand Prix Round of 16.
Loss	2–2	Sergey Bobrov	Decision (unanimous)	Voronezh MMA Federation: Fight Riot 2	October 12, 2013	3	5:00	Voronezh, Russia	
Win	2–1	Albert Ismailov	TKO (punches)	Steel Fist Cup 2013	July 5, 2013	1	1:52	Moscow, Russia	
Loss	1–1	Vasily Feyzrakhmanov	Submission (rear-naked choke)	League S-70: Russian Grand Prix 2011 (Stage 3)	April 6, 2012	1	4:07	Moscow, Russia	Light Heavyweight debut.
Win	1–0	Rasul Magomedov	TKO (punches)	Modern Fighting Pankration: Amur Challenge 2	March 31, 2012	1	3:45	Blagoveschensk, Russia	Middleweight debut.
