= 2016 in Absolute Championship Berkut =

Mixed martial arts events

Information
- First date: February 6, 2016
- Last date: December 18, 2016

Events
- Total events: 26
- Kickboxing: 4

The year 2016 was the fourth year in the history of the Absolute Championship Berkut, a mixed martial arts promotion based in Russia. 2016 started with Absolute Championship Berkut 29 . It started broadcasting through a television agreement with Match TV.

== List of events ==
=== Mixed martial arts ===
#	Event Title	Date	Arena	Location
1	ACB 29: Poland	February 6, 2016	Hala Torwar	Warsaw, Poland
2	ACB 30: Young Eagles 5	February 20, 2016	Arena Coliseum	Grozny, Russia
3	ACB 31: Magomedsharipov vs. Arapkhanov	March 9, 2016	Arena Coliseum	Grozny, Russia
4	ACB 32: The Battle of Lions	March 26, 2016	Dynamo Palace of Sports in Krylatskoye	Moscow, Russia
5	ACB 33: Young Eagles 6	April 16, 2016	Arena Coliseum	Grozny, Russia
6	ACB 34: Young Eagles 7	April 29, 2016	Arena Coliseum	Grozny, Russia
7	ACB 35: In Memory of Guram Gugenishvili	May 6, 2016	Tbilisi Sports Palace	(Georgia (country)) Tbilisi, Georgia
8	ACB 36: Young Eagles 8	May 10, 2016	Sports Hall Coliseum	Grozny, Russia
9	ACB 37: Young Eagles 9	May 11, 2016	Sports Hall Coliseum	Grozny, Russia
10	ACB 38: Breakthrough	May 20, 2016	KSK "Ekspress"	Rostov-on-Don, Russia
11	ACB 39: Young Eagles 10	May 28, 2016	Kristall Ice Sports Palace	Saratov, Russia
12	ACB 40: Battleground	June 3, 2016	Sports Palace Olymp	Krasnodar, Russia
13	ACB 41: The Path to Triumph	July 15, 2016	Adler Arena	Sochi, Russia
14	ACB 42: Young Eagles 11	August 10, 2016	Sports Palace "Manezh"	Vladikavkaz, Russia
15	ACB 43: Battle of the Sura	August 20, 2016	Dizel Arena	Penza, Russia
16	ACB 44: Young Eagles 12	August 20, 2016	SC Arena	Volgograd, Russia
17	ACB 45: Siberia vs. Caucasus	September 17, 2016	Ice Palace	Saint Petersburg, Russia
18	ACB 46: Olsztyński Legion - Young Eagles 13	September 24, 2016	Hala Urania	Olsztyn, Poland
19	ACB 47: Braveheart - Young Eagles 14	October 1, 2016	The SSE Hydro	Glasgow, Scotland
20	ACB 48: Revenge	October 22, 2016	Dynamo Palace of Sports in Krylatskoye	Moscow, Russia
21	ACB 49: Rostov Onslaught	November 26, 2016	Sport-Don Sports Palace	Rostov-on-Don, Russia
22	ACB 50: Stormbringer	December 18, 2016	Sibur Arena	Saint Petersburg, Russia

=== Kickboxing ===
#	Event Title	Date	Arena	Location
1	ACB KB 5: Let's Knock The Winter Out	February 27, 2016	Grinn Center	Oryol, Russia
2	ACB KB 6: Battle in Brussels	June 5, 2016	Sporthal Merchtem	Brussels, Belgium
3	ACB KB 7: Bloody Night	September 18, 2016	Horia Demian Sports Hall	Cluj-Napoca, Romania
4	ACB KB 8: Only The Braves	October 16, 2016	Sportcomplex Koning Willem-Alexander	Hoofddorp, Netherlands

== ACB 29: Poland ==
ACB 29: Poland
- Promotion: Absolute Championship Berkut
- Date: February 6, 2016
- Venue: Hala Torwar
- City: Warsaw, Poland

Event chronology
ACB 28	ACB 29: Poland	ACB 30

Absolute Championship Berkut 29: Poland was a mixed martial arts event held by Absolute Championship Berkut on February 6, 2016, at the Hala Torwar in Warsaw, Poland.

=== Results ===
Fight Card
Weight Class				Method	Round	Time	Notes
Heavyweight 120 kg	(Russia) Salimgerey Rasulov	def.	(Russia) Zelimkhan Umiev	Decision (Unanimous)	5	5:00	For the ACB Heavyweight Championship.
Lightweight 70 kg	(Russia) Musa Khamanaev	def.	(Brazil) Leandro Rodrigues	TKO (Submission to punches)	3	0:51	
Heavyweight 120 kg	(Poland) Michał Andryszak	def.	(Germany) Björn Schmiedeberg	TKO (Punches)	1	1:38	
Featherweight 66 kg	(Russia) Yusup Raisov	def.	(Poland) Sebastian Romanowski	Decision (Unanimous)	3	5:00	
Lightweight 70 kg	(Poland) Adrian Zieliński	def.	(Russia) Ustarmagomed Gadzhidaudov	Decision (Unanimous)	3	5:00	
Middleweight 84 kg	(Poland) Adam Zając	def.	(Russia) Shamkhan Barakhanov	TKO (Punches)	1	4:12	
Catchweight 68 kg	(Russia) Magomed Khamzaev	def.	(Czech Republic) Tomáš Sušina	KO (Head Kick and Punches)	1	0:45	
Flyweight 57 kg	(Russia) Askar Askarov	def.	(Poland) Marcin Lasota	TKO (Punches)	2	3:35	
Bantamweight 61 kg	(Poland) Damian Szmigielski	def.	(Ukraine) Alexander Pletenko	Submission (Triangle Choke)	1	4:12	
Heavyweight 120 kg	(Russia) Zaurbek Bashaev	def.	(Brazil) Alexandre Zaneti	TKO (Punches)	1	4:43	
Catchweight 89 kg	(Poland) Wojciech Orłowski	def.	(Poland) Krzysztof Pietraszek	Submission (Rear Naked Choke)	1	2:59	
Featherweight 66 kg	(Armenia) Armen Stepanyan	def.	(Poland) Marcin Jaskot	Submission (North-South Choke)	1	4:30	

== ACB 30: Young Eagles 5 ==
ACB 30: Young Eagles 5
- Promotion: Absolute Championship Berkut
- Date: February 20, 2016
- Venue: Arena Coliseum
- City: Grozny, Russia

Event chronology
ACB 29	ACB 30: Young Eagles 5	ACB KB 5

Absolute Championship Berkut 30: Young Eagles 5 was a mixed martial arts event held by Absolute Championship Berkut on February 20, 2016, at the Arena Coliseum in Grozny, Russia.

=== Results ===
Fight Card
Weight Class				Method	Round	Time	Notes
Lightweight 70 kg	(Russia) Yusup Umarov	def.	(Uzbekistan) Azizbek Sharipov	TKO (Punches)	1	0:59	
Lightweight 70 kg	(Russia) Magomed Raisov	def.	(Kyrgyzstan) Adiletbek Muktarov	Submission (Kimura)	2	3:52	
Lightweight 70 kg	(Poland) Lambert Akhiadov	def.	(Russia) Rim Khaziakhmetov	Submission (Kimura)	2	3:52	
Featherweight 66 kg	(Poland) Saifulla Dzhabrailov	def.	(Ukraine) Sergey Prokopyuk	Decision (Unanimous)	3	5:00	
Featherweight 66 kg	(Poland) Alikhan Suleimanov	def.	(Ukraine) Alexey Oleinik	Submission (Rear Naked Choke)	1	1:04	
Lightweight 70 kg	(Russia) Stanislav Vlasenko	def.	(Poland) Aslambek Arsamikov	Decision (Unanimous)	3	5:00	
Middleweight 83 kg	(Russia) Ali Eskiev	def.	(Russia) Sergey Yaskovets	Submission (Rear Naked Choke)	1	2:38	
Bantamweight 61 kg	(Russia) Shamil Shakhbulatov	def.	(Serbia) Mateus Kazanovic	Decision (Unanimous)	3	5:00	
Bantamweight 61 kg	(Canada) Xavier Alaoui	def.	(Tajikistan) Firuz Abdulloev	Submission (Heel Hook)	1	1:51	
Bantamweight 61 kg	(Russia) Rustam Asuev	def.	(Russia) Edik Razahanov	Submission (Guillotine Choke)	1	1:38	
Lightweight 70 kg	(Russia) Khamzat Dalgiev	def.	(Russia) Valery Gritsutin	Decision (Unanimous)	3	5:00	
Light heavyweight 93 kg	(Russia) Baysangur Vakhitov	def.	(Russia) Elmar Muradzade	Decision (Unanimous)	3	5:00	
Lightweight 70 kg	(Russia) Magomed-Emin Myatliev	def.	(Russia) Said-Khamzat Khanukaev	Decision (Unanimous)	3	5:00	
Lightweight 70 kg	(Russia) Azamat Gazzaev	def.	(Russia) Akhmed Ibragimov	Decision (Split)	3	5:00	
Heavyweight 120 kg	(Russia) Anzor Shakhmurzaev	def.	(Russia) Abdulbasir Vagabov	Decision (Majority)	3	5:00	
Lightweight 70 kg	(Russia) Rashid Kushu	def.	(Russia) Alexey Oleinik	TKO (Punches)	1	3:18	

== ACB KB 5: Let's Knock The Winter Out ==
ACB KB 5: Let's Knock The Winter Out
- Promotion: Absolute Championship Berkut
- Date: February 27, 2016
- Venue: Grinn Center
- City: Orel, Russia

Event chronology
ACB 30	ACB KB 5: Let's Knock The Winter Out	ACB 31

Absolute Championship Berkut Kickboxing 5: Let's Knock The Winter Out was a Kickboxing event held by Absolute Championship Berkut on February 27, 2016, at the Grinn Center in Orel, Russia.

== ACB 31: Magomedsharipov vs. Arapkhanov ==
ACB 31: Magomedsharipov vs. Arapkhanov
- Promotion: Absolute Championship Berkut
- Date: March 9, 2016
- Venue: Arena Coliseum
- City: Grozny, Russia

Event chronology
ACB KB 5	ACB 31: Magomedsharipov vs. Arapkhanov	ACB 32

Absolute Championship Berkut 31: Magomedsharipov vs. Arapkhanov was a mixed martial arts event held by Absolute Championship Berkut on March 9, 2016, at the Arena Coliseum in Grozny, Russia.

=== Results ===
Fight Card
Weight Class				Method	Round	Time	Notes
Featherweight 66 kg	(Russia) Zabit Magomedsharipov	def.	(Russia) Sheikh-Magomed Arapkhanov	KO (Punch)	1	4:19	For the ACB Featherweight Championship.
Lightweight 70 kg	(Russia) Ali Bagov	def.	(Angola) Artur Lemos	Submission (Rear Naked Choke)	1	3:49	
Middleweight 70 kg	(Russia) Abdul-Rakhman Dzhanaev	def.	(Portugal) Aires Benrois	Decision (Unanimous)	2	3:52	
Featherweight 66 kg	(Russia) Abdul-Rakhman Temirov	def.	(Czech Republic) Jaroslav Pokorný	Submission (Rear Naked Choke)	2	1:31	
Lightweight 70 kg	(Russia) Rasul Shovhalov	def.	(Croatia) Zdravko Dukić	Decision (Unanimous)	3	5:00	
Featherweight 65 kg	(Russia) Adlan Bataev	def.	(Brazil) Marcos Vinicius	TKO (Punches)	2	4:25	
Welterweight 77 kg	(Russia) Shamil Abdulkhalikov	def.	(Brazil) Julio Cesar dos Santos	Decision (Unanimous)	3	5:00	
Bantamweight 61 kg	(Russia) Murad Kalamov	def.	(Kyrgyzstan) Ryskulbek Ibraimov	Decision (Unanimous)	3	5:00	
Bantamweight 61 kg	(Russia) Magomed Ginazov	def.	(Russia) Kirill Medvedovsky	Decision (Unanimous)	3	5:00	
Lightweight 70 kg	(Russia) Rasul Yakhyaev	def.	(Russia) Alexander Panasyuk	Decision (Unanimous)	3	5:00	
Featherweight 65 kg	(Russia) Marat Balayev	def.	(Russia) Mukhamed Kokov	Decision (Unanimous)	3	5:00	

== ACB 32: The Battle of Lions ==
ACB 32: The Battle of Lions
- Promotion: Absolute Championship Berkut
- Date: March 26, 2016
- Venue: Dynamo Palace of Sports in Krylatskoye
- City: Moscow, Russia
- Attendance: 5,000

Event chronology
ACB 31	ACB 32: The Battle of Lions	ACB 33

Absolute Championship Berkut 32: The Battle of Lions was a mixed martial arts event held by Absolute Championship Berkut on March 26, 2016, at the Dynamo Palace of Sports in Krylatskoye in Moscow, Russia.

=== Results ===
Fight Card
Weight Class				Method	Round	Time	Notes
Lightweight 70 kg	(Russia) Abdul-Aziz Abdulvakhabov	def.	(Russia) Eduard Vartanyan	TKO (Punches)	1	1:37	For the ACB Lightweight Championship.
Featherweight 66 kg	(Russia) Magomed Magomedov	def.	(Russia) Petr Yan	Decision (Split)	5	5:00	For the ACB Bantamweight Championship.
Heavyweight 120 kg	(Russia) Denis Goltsov	def.	(United States) Mike Kyle	Submission (Triangle Choke)	1	2:18	
Welterweight 77 kg	(Czech Republic) Patrik Kincl	def.	(Russia) Sergey Khandozhko	Decision (Unanimous)	3	5:00	
Light Heavyweight 93 kg	(Russia) Ilya Sheglov	vs.	(Russia) Zaurbek Bashaev	No Contest	3	5:00	
Lightweight 70 kg	(Russia) Andrei Koshkin	def.	(Brazil) Julio Cesar de Almeida	Decision (Unanimous)	3	5:00	
Bantamweight 61 kg	(Azerbaijan) Tural Ragimov	def.	(Russia) Sergey Razin	Submission (Rear Naked Choke)	2	2:32	
Lightweight 70 kg	(Russia) Shamil Nikaev	def.	(Brazil) Jamil Silveira da Conceicao	Decision (Unanimous)	3	5:00	
Lightweight 70 kg	(Russia) Ramazan Esenbaev	def.	(Russia) Evgeny Lakhin	Decision (Unanimous)	3	5:00	
Bantamweight 61 kg	(Russia) Evgeniy Lazuko	def.	(Russia) Khamid Sultanbiev	Decision (Unanimous)	3	5:00	
Welterweight 77 kg	(Russia) Sharaf Davlatmurodov	vs.	(Russia) Imran Abaev	Draw (Majority)	3	5:00	
Heavyweight 120 kg	(Russia) Sergei Bilostenniy	def.	(Russia) Khanif Mirzamagomedov	Decision (Unanimous)	3	5:00	
Bantamweight 61 kg	(Russia) Zaira Dyshekova	def.	(Russia) Yana Kunitskaya	Submission (Armbar)	1	3:38	

== ACB 33: Young Eagles 6 ==
ACB 33: Young Eagles 6
- Promotion: Absolute Championship Berkut
- Date: April 16, 2016
- Venue: Arena Coliseum
- City: Grozny, Russia

Event chronology
ACB 32	ACB 33: Young Eagles 6	ACB 34

Absolute Championship Berkut 33: Young Eagles 6 was a mixed martial arts event held by Absolute Championship Berkut on April 16, 2016, at the Arena Coliseum in Grozny, Russia.

=== Results ===
Fight Card
Weight Class				Method	Round	Time	Notes
Lightweight 70 kg	(Russia) Rakhman Makhazhiev	def.	(Ukraine) Maxim Pashkov	KO (Punch)	1	0:21	
Lightweight 70 kg	(Russia) Islam Isaev	def.	(Bulgaria) Vladislav Genov	Decision (Unanimous)	3	5:00	
Middleweight 84 kg	(Poland) Sylwester Borys	def.	(Russia) Batyrkhan Gosenov	Submission (Anaconda Choke)	3	3:45	
Bantamweight 61 kg	(Russia) Nashkho Galaev	def.	(Russia) Vyacheslav Irtamaev	KO (Kick to the Body)	3	2:50	
Welterweight 77 kg	(Russia) Karim Magomedov	def.	(Russia) Oleg Olenichev	Decision (Unanimous)	3	5:00	
Lightweight 70 kg	(Russia) Magomed Sulumov	def.	(Russia) Grigory Maltsev	Decision (Unanimous)	3	5:00	
Featherweight 65 kg	(Russia) Ramzan Dukaev	def.	(Russia) Ramazan Ismailov	Submission (Guillotine Choke)	1	1:10	
Featherweight 65 kg	(Russia) Abdusamad Sangov	def.	(Russia) Maksim Schekin	TKO (Punches)	3	2:07	
Lightweight 70 kg	(Russia) Jokhar Duraev	def.	(Russia) Azamat Gazzaev	Decision (Unanimous)	3	5:00	
Featherweight 65 kg	(Russia) Bashir Gagiev	def.	(Russia) Tamerlan Kabulov	Decision (Unanimous)	3	5:00	
Lightweight 70 kg	(Kyrgyzstan) Belek Sharip	def.	(Russia) Jabir Vazirkhanov	Submission (Heel Hook)	1	2:07	
Featherweight 65 kg	(Russia) Mehdi Baydulaev	def.	(Russia) Renat Ondar	Decision (Unanimous)	3	5:00	
Featherweight 65 kg	(Russia) Ibragim Navruzov	def.	(Russia) Nikolai Bredikhin	Decision (Unanimous)	3	5:00	
Heavyweight 120 kg	(Ukraine) Yuriy Protsenko	def.	(Russia) Selim Mutalimov	TKO (Punches)	2	3:18	
Flyweight 56 kg	(Russia) Shamil Akhmaev	def.	(Russia) Vladislav Bokov	Submission (Kimura)	1	4:19	
Welterweight 77 kg	(Russia) Umar Gaisumov	def.	(Russia) Talgat Shatmatov	Submission (Rear Naked Choke)	2	1:07	

== ACB 34: Young Eagles 7 ==
ACB 34: Young Eagles 7
- Promotion: Absolute Championship Berkut
- Date: April 29, 2016
- Venue: Arena Coliseum
- City: Grozny, Russia

Event chronology
ACB 33	ACB 34: Young Eagles 7	ACB 35

Absolute Championship Berkut 34: Young Eagles 7 was a mixed martial arts event held by Absolute Championship Berkut on April 29, 2016, at the Arena Coliseum in Grozny, Russia.

=== Results ===
Fight Card
Weight Class				Method	Round	Time	Notes
Middleweight 84 kg	(Turkey) Ibragim Chuzhigaev	def.	(Ukraine) Vadim Orischak	Submission (Arm-Triangle Choke)	1	2:33	
Lightweight 70 kg	(Russia) Khamzat Aushev	def.	(Russia) Magomed Dzhabarov	Submission (Triangle Choke)	1	3:18	
Welterweight 77 kg	(Russia) Daud Shaikhaev	def.	(Russia) Ivan Volodichev	Submission (Rear Naked Choke)	2	4:22	
Lightweight 70 kg	(Russia) Adam Aliev	def.	(Russia) Magomed Suleymanov	Submission (Triangle Choke)	1	2:07	
Heavyweight 120 kg	(Russia) Anzor Shakhmurzaev	def.	(Russia) Oleg Kubanov	TKO (Doctor Stoppage)	1	3:31	
Middleweight 84 kg	(Russia) Payzulla Magomedov	def.	(Ukraine) Ivan Kashcheev	Submission (Guillotine Choke)	1	1:38	
Bantamweight 61 kg	(Russia) Islam Yunusov	def.	(Russia) Anton Vasiliev	Submission (Armbar)	1	4:43	
Lightweight 70 kg	(Russia) Amir Elzhurkaev	def.	(Russia) Dmitry Tamaev	KO (Kick to the Body)	2	3:58	
Lightweight 70 kg	(Russia) Muslim Abdulaev	def.	(Belarus) Viktor Azatyan	Decision (Unanimous)	3	5:00	
Middleweight 84 kg	(Russia) Dzhabrail Yasaev	def.	(Russia) Vladimir Pikero	Decision (Unanimous)	3	5:00	
Featherweight 65 kg	(Russia) Saikhan Dzhabrailov	def.	(Russia) Edvin Arustamyan	Decision (Unanimous)	3	5:00	
Light Heavyweight 93 kg	(Russia) Ivan Lukin	def.	(Russia) Dzhabrail Duzaev	Submission (Armbar)	3	1:16	
Middleweight 84 kg	(Russia) Sadrudin Vakhidov	def.	(Russia) Maxim Konovalov	Decision (Majority)	3	5:00	
Bantamweight 61 kg	(Russia) Khusein Sheikhaev	def.	(Russia) Artem Simonyan	Submission (Triangle Choke)	1	3:35	
Middleweight 84 kg	(Russia) Alexandr Sayan	def.	(Tajikistan) Islom Alizoda	TKO (Knees and Punches)	3	1:30	
Featherweight 65 kg	(Russia) Dukvaha Astamirov	def.	(Tajikistan) Farukh Khabibulloev	Decision (Unanimous)	3	5:00	
Bantamweight 61 kg	(Russia) Khusein Maltsagov	def.	(Kyrgyzstan) Kylychbek Sadirdinov	Submission (Rear Naked Choke)	1	4:55	
Featherweight 65 kg	(Russia) Mansur Arsakhanov	def.	(Russia) Yuri Morozov	Submission (Rear Naked Choke)	1	3:41	
Lightweight 70 kg	(Russia) Adlan Mamaev	def.	(Russia) Gennadiy Zhuk	Decision (Unanimous)	3	5:00	

== ACB 35: In Memory of Guram Gugenishvili ==
ACB 35: In Memory of Guram Gugenishvili
- Promotion: Absolute Championship Berkut
- Date: May 6, 2016
- Venue: Tbilisi Sports Palace
- City: (Georgia (country)) Tbilisi, Georgia

Event chronology
ACB 34	ACB 35: In Memory of Guram Gugenishvili	ACB 36

Absolute Championship Berkut 35: In Memory of Guram Gugenishvili was a mixed martial arts event held by Absolute Championship Berkut on May 6, 2016, at the Tbilisi Sports Palace in Tbilisi, Georgia.

=== Results ===
Fight Card
Weight Class				Method	Round	Time	Notes
Welterweight 77 kg	(Russia) Albert Duraev	def.	(Russia) Michail Tsarev	TKO (Punches)	1	2:13	For the ACB Welterweight Championship.
Light Heavyweight 93 kg	(Russia) Gadzhimurad Antigulov	def.	(Russia) Muslim Makhmudov	Submission (Rear Naked Choke)	2	2:49	For the ACB Light Heavyweight Championship.
Welterweight 77 kg	(Russia) Beslan Isaev	def.	(United States) Jesse Juarez	Submission (Armbar)	1	4:44	
Middleweight 84 kg	(Georgia (country)) Nodar Kudukhashvili	def.	(Brazil) Arymarcel Santos	TKO (Punches)	1	3:15	
Lightweight 70 kg	(Russia) Amirkhan Adaev	def.	(United States) Eddy Ellis	TKO (Leg Injury)	2	2:33	
Middleweight 84 kg	(Georgia (country)) Giorgi Lobzhanidze	def.	(Ukraine) Vladimir Katyhin	Decision (Unanimous)	3	5:00	
Lightweight 70 kg	(Poland) Adrian Zielinsk	def.	(Russia) Rasul Ediev	Submission (Rear Naked Choke)	2	2:13	
Bantamweight 61 kg	(Georgia (country)) Beno Adamia	def.	(Ukraine) Vladislav Tkachenko	KO (Punch)	1	4:49	
Bantamweight 61 kg	(Russia) Maharbek Karginov	def.	(Kazakhstan) Denis Mutsnek	Submission (Triangle Choke)	1	1:12	
Lightweight 70 kg	(Ukraine) Vladislav Stepanov	def.	(Georgia (country)) Tamaz Bochorishvili	Submission (Triangle Choke)	2	2:04	
Lightweight 70 kg	(Georgia (country)) Soso Nizharadze	def.	(Greece) George Kechgias	Decision (Unanimous)	3	5:00	

== ACB 36: Young Eagles 8 ==
ACB 36: Young Eagles 8
- Promotion: Absolute Championship Berkut
- Date: May 10, 2016
- Venue: Sports Hall Coliseum
- City: Grozny, Russia

Event chronology
ACB 35	ACB 36: Young Eagles 8	ACB 37

Absolute Championship Berkut 36: Young Eagles 8 was a mixed martial arts event held by Absolute Championship Berkut on May 10, 2016, at the Sports Hall Coliseum in Grozny, Russia.

=== Results ===
Fight Card
Weight Class				Method	Round	Time	Notes
Lightweight 70 kg	(Russia) Usman Bisultanov	def.	(Russia) Robert Ramazanov	TKO (Punches)	1	2:27	
Welterweight 77 kg	(Russia) Khasanbek Abdulaev	def.	(Russia) Omar Abdulaev	Submission (Rear Naked Choke)	1	0:45	
Flyweight 57 kg	(Russia) Aslanbek Karov	def.	(Russia) Muslim Madaev	Decision (Unanimous)	3	5:00	
Welterweight 77 kg	(Russia) Said-Khamzat Khanukaev	def.	(Uzbekistan) Ulugbek Gadoev	Decision (Unanimous)	3	5:00	
Featherweight 66 kg	(Russia) Islam Umarov	def.	(Russia) Islam Balov	Decision (Unanimous)	3	5:00	

== ACB 37: Young Eagles 9 ==
ACB 37: Young Eagles 9
- Promotion: Absolute Championship Berkut
- Date: May 11, 2016
- Venue: Sports Hall Coliseum
- City: Grozny, Russia

Event chronology
ACB 36	ACB 37: Young Eagles 9	ACB 38

Absolute Championship Berkut 37: Young Eagles 9 was a mixed martial arts event held by Absolute Championship Berkut on May 11, 2016, at the Sports Hall Coliseum in Grozny, Russia.

=== Results ===
Fight Card
Weight Class				Method	Round	Time	Notes
Lightweight 70 kg	(Russia) Saikhan Doldaev	def.	(Russia) Abdula Abdulaev	Decision (Unanimous)	3	5:00	
Lightweight 70 kg	(Russia) Murat Tlyarukov	def.	(Russia) Lom-Ali Nalgiev	Decision (Majority)	3	5:00	
Lightweight 70 kg	(Russia) Viskhan Magomadov	def.	(Uzbekistan) Azizbek Sharipov	TKO (Punches)	1	2:30	
Light Heavyweight 93 kg	(Russia) Abdulla Isaev	def.	(Russia) Ilyas Mustabirov	TKO (Retirement)	2	5:00	
Bantamweight 61 kg	(Russia) Khalid Shaipov	def.	(Russia) Suren Avdalyan	Submission (Triangle Choke)	1	1:22	

== ACB 38: Breakthrough ==
ACB 38: Breakthrough
- Promotion: Absolute Championship Berkut
- Date: May 20, 2016
- Venue: KSK "Ekspress"
- City: Rostov-on-Don, Russia

Event chronology
ACB 37	ACB 38: Breakthrough	ACB 39

Absolute Championship Berkut 38: Breakthrough was a mixed martial arts event held by Absolute Championship Berkut on May 20, 2016, at the KSK "Ekspress" in Rostov-on-Don, Russia.

=== Results ===
Fight Card
Weight Class				Method	Round	Time	Notes
Middleweight 84 kg	(Russia) Anatoly Tokov	def.	(Russia) Arbi Aguev	TKO (punches)	4	4:16	For the vacant ACB Middleweight Championship.
Lightweight 70 kg	(Russia) Ali Bagov	def.	(Ukraine) Renat Lyatifov	TKO (punches)	1	0:47	
Welterweight 77 kg	(Russia) Sergey Khandozhko	def.	(Brazil) Mauricio Machado	KO (head kick)	1	0:05	
Light Heavyweight 93 kg	(Russia) Isa Umarov	def.	(United States) Rodney Wallace	Decision (unanimous)	3	5:00	
Bantamweight 61 kg	(Russia) Oleg Borisov	def.	(Czech Republic) Filip Macek	TKO (punches)	2	1:33	
Flyweight 57 kg	(Finland) Mikael Silander	def.	(United States) Cory Alexander	Submission (rear-naked choke)	1	4:58	

== ACB 39: Young Eagles 10 ==
ACB 39: Young Eagles 10
- Promotion: Absolute Championship Berkut
- Date: May 28, 2016
- Venue: Kristall Ice Sports Palace
- City: Saratov, Russia

Event chronology
ACB 38	ACB 39: Young Eagles 10	ACB 40

Absolute Championship Berkut 39: Young Eagles 10 was a mixed martial arts event held by Absolute Championship Berkut on May 28, 2016, at the Kristall Ice Sports Palace in Saratov, Russia.

=== Results ===
Fight Card
Weight Class				Method	Round	Time	Notes
Lightweight 70 kg	(Russia) Magomed Raisov	vs.	(Switzerland) Michael Bobner	No Contest	3	5:00	
Lightweight 70 kg	(Russia) Said-Khamzat Avkhadov	def.	(Russia) Ramazan Ismailov	Submission (Rear Naked Choke)	1	2:57	
Lightweight 70 kg	(Russia) Yusup Umarov	def.	(Ukraine) Aleksandr Panasyuk	TKO (Punches)	1	2:40	
Lightweight 70 kg	(Azerbaijan) Anvar Amirli	def.	(Poland) Lambert Akhiadov	Decision (Split)	3	5:00	
Bantamweight 61 kg	(Russia) Alikhan Suleimanov	def.	(Russia) Oleg Peterimov	Submission (North-South Choke)	1	2:48	

== ACB 40: Battleground ==
ACB 40: Battleground
- Promotion: Absolute Championship Berkut
- Date: June 3, 2016
- Venue: Sports Palace Olymp
- City: Krasnodar, Russia

Event chronology
ACB 39	ACB 40: Battleground	ACB KB 6

Absolute Championship Berkut 40: Battleground was a mixed martial arts event held by Absolute Championship Berkut on June 3, 2016, at the Sports Palace Olymp in Krasnodar, Russia.

=== Results ===
Fight Card
Weight Class				Method	Round	Time	Notes
Welterweight 77 kg	(Russia) Aslambek Saidov	def.	(United States) Jesse Taylor	Submission (Guillotine Choke )	1	3:29	
Middleweight 84 kg	(Russia) Muslim Khizriev	def.	(Bulgaria) Nikola Dipchikov	Submission (Rear Naked Choke)	2	2:40	
Middleweight 84 kg	(Russia) Shamil Abdulkhalikov	def.	(Russia) Abdul-Rakhman Dzhanaev	Decision (Unanimous)	3	5:00	
Featherweight 66 kg	(Russia) Yusup Raisov	def.	(Brazil) Carlos Alexandre	Submission (Rear Naked Choke)	3	3:49	
Featherweight 66 kg	(Russia) Adlan Bataev	def.	(Russia) Oleg Peterimov	Decision (Unanimous)	3	5:00	

== ACB KB 6: Battle in Brussels ==
ACB KB 6: Battle in Brussels
- Promotion: Absolute Championship Berkut
- Date: June 5, 2016
- Venue: Sporthal Merchtem
- City: Brussels, Belgium

Event chronology
ACB 40	ACB KB 6: Battle in Brussels	ACB 41

Absolute Championship Berkut Kickboxing 6: Battle in Brussels was a Kickboxing event held by Absolute Championship Berkut on June 5, 2016, at the Sporthal Merchtem in Brussels, Belgium.

=== Results ===
Fight Card
Weight Class				Method	Round	Notes
KB Heavyweight 120 kg	(Brazil) Jhonata Diniz	def.	(Belgium) Kirk Krouba	TKO (Corner Stoppage)	3	For the ACB KB Heavyweight Championship.
KB Light Heavyweight 95 kg	(Belarus) Igor Bugaenko	def.	(Suriname) Redouan Cairo	Decision (Unanimous)	3	
KB Catchweight 80 kg	(Democratic Republic of the Congo) Mbanba Cauwenbergh	def.	(Morocco) Jaouad Taghdoini	Decision (Unanimous)	3	
KB Welterweight 77 kg	(Russia) Mansur vaduev	def.	(Netherlands) Faysal Bouhlou	Decision (Unanimous)	3	
KB Catchweight 80 kg	(Russia) Alexander Stetsurenko	def.	(Belgium) Alka Matewa	Decision (Unanimous)	3	
KB Female Catchweight 68 kg	(Belgium) Anke Van Gestel	def.	(Italy) Poala Cappucci	TKO (Doctor Stoppage)	1	
KB Featherweight 66 kg	(Russia) Islam Baybatyrov	def.	(Colombia) Eddie Vendetta	KO (Punches)	3	
KB Catchweight 72.5 kg	(Belgium) Youssef Challouki	def.	(Netherlands) Mika Tahitu	TKO (Referee Stoppage)	3	
KB Featherweight 66 kg	(Morocco) Zakaria Tijarti	def.	(Belgium) Jean-Pierre Habimana	Decision (Unanimous)	3	
KB Lightweight 70 kg	(Georgia (country)) Tamaz Izoria		(Morocco) Younes Rahmouni	DRAW	3	
KB Bantamweight 61 kg	(Russia) Tamerlan Bashirov	def.	(Belgium) Donny Bloomart	KO (Punch)	3	

== ACB 41: The Path to Triumph ==
ACB 41: The Path to Triumph
- Promotion: Absolute Championship Berkut
- Date: July 15, 2016
- Venue: Adler Arena
- City: Sochi, Russia

Event chronology
ACB KB 6	ACB 41: The Path to Triumph	ACB 42

Absolute Championship Berkut 41: The Path to Triumph was a mixed martial arts event held by Absolute Championship Berkut on July 15, 2016, at the Adler Arena in Sochi, Russia.

=== Results ===
Fight Card
Weight Class				Method	Round	Time	Notes
Heavyweight 120 kg	(Russia) Denis Goltsov	def.	(United States) Paul Buentello	KO (Head Kick)	1	3:08	
Bantamweight 61 kg	(Russia) Petr Yan	def.	(England) Ed Arthur	Decision (Unanimous)	3	5:00	
Lightweight 70 kg	(Russia) Eduard Vartanyan	def.	(Brazil) Márcio Breno	KO (Knee and Punches)	3	0:22	
Lightweight 70 kg	(Russia) Alexandr Shabliy	def.	(United States) Michael Brightmon	TKO (Punches)	1	1:08	
Featherweight 66 kg	(Russia) Sharaf Davlatmurodov	def.	(Australia) Ben Alloway	KO (Kick to the Body)	2	2:39	
Welterweight 77 kg	(Cuba) Guillermo Martinez Ayme	def.	(Russia) Ibragim Tibilov	KO (Punches)	3	1:10	
Featherweight 66 kg	(Georgia (country)) Soso Nizharadze	def.	(England) Mike Wilkinson	Decision (Unanimous)	3	5:00	
Featherweight 66 kg	(Poland) Michał Andryszak	def.	(Canada) Tim Hague	TKO (Head Kick and Punches)	1	0:33	
Featherweight 66 kg	(Russia) Marat Balayev	def.	(France) Suleiman Bouhata	Submission (Rear-Naked Choke)	1	1:30	
Featherweight 66 kg	(Russia) Ilya Freymanov	def.	(Russia) Ovanes Ormandzhyan	TKO (Retirement)	2	5:00	
Bantamweight 61 kg	(Russia) Valeriy Khazhirokov	def.	(Russia) Vyacheslav Gagiev	TKO (Punches)	2	3:16	
Lightweight 70 kg	(Russia) Yuriy Verenitsen	def.	(Russia) Alexey Bruss	Submission (Guillotine Choke)	2	1:07	

== ACB 42: Young Eagles 11 ==
ACB 42: Young Eagles 11
- Promotion: Absolute Championship Berkut
- Date: August 10, 2016
- Venue: Sports Palace "Manezh"
- City: Vladikavkaz, Russia

Event chronology
ACB 41	ACB 42: Young Eagles 11	ACB 43

Absolute Championship Berkut 42: Young Eagles 11 was a mixed martial arts event held by Absolute Championship Berkut on August 10, 2016, at the Sports Palace "Manezh" in Vladikavkaz, Russia.

=== Results ===
Fight Card
Weight Class				Method	Round	Time	Notes
Catchweight 86 kg	(Russia) Rustam Chsiev	def.	(Belarus) Igor Litoshik	TKO (Punches)	3	3:00	
Middleweight 84 kg	(Russia) Ali Eskiev	def.	(Russia) Tagir Magomedov	Submission (Rear Naked Choke)	2	3:54	
Lightweight 70 kg	(Russia) Khamzat Dalgiev	def.	(Russia) Dmitry Korobeynikov	Submission (Guillotine Choke)	1	3:04	
Middleweight 84 kg	(Russia) Azamat Bekoev	def.	(Russia) Dzhabrail Yasaev	Submission (Guillotine Choke)	3	1:30	
Middleweight 84 kg	(Russia) Marat Khugaev	def.	(Russia) Magomed Bilalov	Submission (North-South Choke)	2	2:10	

== ACB 43: Battle of the Sura ==
ACB 43: Battle of the Sura
- Promotion: Absolute Championship Berkut
- Date: August 20, 2016
- Venue: Dizel Arena
- City: Penza, Russia

Event chronology
ACB 42	ACB 43: Battle of the Sura	ACB 44

Absolute Championship Berkut 43: Battle of the Sura was a mixed martial arts event held by Absolute Championship Berkut on August 20, 2016, at the Dizel Arena in Penza, Russia.

=== Results ===
Fight Card
Weight Class				Method	Round	Time	Notes
Lightweight 70 kg	(Russia) Musa Khamanaev	def.	(United States) Bruce Boyington	Decision (Unanimous)	3	5:00	
Flyweight 57 kg	(Russia) Velimurad Alkhasov	def.	(Russia) Rasul Albaskhanov	No Contest (Illegal Knee)	4	2:50	
Welterweight 77 kg	(United States) Brett Cooper	def.	(Russia) Beslan Isaev	Decision (Unanimous)	3	5:00	
Light Heavyweight 93 kg	(Brazil) Charles Andrade	def.	(Russia) Ramis Teregulov	KO (Punch)	2	2:16	
Featherweight 66 kg	(Russia) Mukhamed Kokov	def.	(Russia) Abdul-Rakhman Temirov	Submission (Rear Naked Choke)	3	4:48	
Middleweight 84 kg	(Brazil) Igor Fernandes	def.	(Russia) Imran Abaev	Submission (Arm Triangle Choke)	3	3:10	
Featherweight 66 kg	(Russia) Nikolai Dakin	def.	(Brazil) Jose Eudes Tavares	Decision (Majority)	3	5:00	
Lightweight 70 kg	(Belgium) Shamil Nikaev	def.	(Angola) Artur Lemos	Decision (Unanimous)	3	5:00	
Lightweight 70 kg	(Russia) Vasily Palok	def.	(Russia) Rim Khaziakhmetov	Decision (Unanimous)	3	5:00	
Welterweight 7 kg	(Russia) Rustam Gadzhiev	def.	(Poland) Emil Rozewski	Submission (Kneebar)	1	2:26	
Light heavyweight 93 kg	(Russia) Idris Amizhaev	def.	(Brazil) Edvan Marques Oliveira	TKO (Punches)	1	1:58	

== ACB 44: Young Eagles 12 ==
ACB 44: Young Eagles 12
- Promotion: Absolute Championship Berkut
- Date: September 3, 2016
- Venue: Volgograd Arena
- City: Volgograd, Russia

Event chronology
ACB 43	ACB 44: Young Eagles 12	ACB 45

Absolute Championship Berkut 44: Young Eagles 12 was a mixed martial arts event held by Absolute Championship Berkut on September 3, 2016, at the Volgograd Arena in Volgograd, Russia.

=== Results ===
Fight Card
Weight Class				Method	Round	Time	Notes
Catchweight 86 kg	(Russia) Azamat Amagov	def.	(Brazil) Arymarcel Santos	TKO (Punches)	1	3:08	
Lightweight 70 kg	(Russia) Khamzat Aushev	def.	(Russia) Yuri Ivlev	Submission (Inverted Triangle Choke)	3	0:58	
Lightweight 70 kg	(Russia) Islam Isaev	def.	(Russia) Egor Golubtsov	Decision (Unanimous)	3	5:00	
Featherweight 66 kg	(Russia) Saifulla Dzhabrailov	def.	(Russia) Ratmir Teuvazhukov	TKO (Corner Stoppage)	1	5:00	
Lightweight 70 kg	(Russia) Lom-Ali Nalgiev	def.	(Russia) Vladimir Nikitin	Decision (Unanimous)	3	5:00	

== ACB 45: Magomedsharipov vs. Silva ==
ACB 45: Magomedsharipov vs Silva
- Promotion: Absolute Championship Berkut
- Date: September 17, 2016
- Venue: Ice Palace
- City: Saint Petersburg, Russia

Event chronology
ACB 44	ACB 45: Magomedsharipov vs Silva	ACB KB 7

Absolute Championship Berkut 45: Magomedsharipov vs. Silva was a mixed martial arts event held by Absolute Championship Berkut on September 17, 2016, at the Ice Palace in Saint Petersburg, Russia.

=== Background ===
Khamzaev actually won the fight via unanimous decision, but after the statement of Mairbek Khasiev about the simulation by Khamzaev - the result of the fight was changed.

=== Results ===
Fight Card
Weight Class				Method	Round	Time	Notes
Featherweight 66 kg	(Russia) Zabit Magomedsharipov	def.	(Brazil) Valdines Silva	TKO (Punches)	1	1:53	For the ACB Featherweight Championship.
Bantamweight 61 kg	(Russia) Oleg Borisov	def.	(Azerbaijan) Tural Ragimov	KO (Punch)	2	0:37	
Lightweight 70 kg	(Russia) Ustarmagomed Gadzhidaudov	def.	(Russia) Alexander Sarnavskiy	TKO (Punches)	2	0:44	
Lightweight 70 kg	(Russia) Andrey Koshkin	def.	(Russia) Ramazan Esenbaev	Decision (Unanimous)	3	5:00	
Light Heavyweight 93 kg	(Russia) Muslim Makhmudov	def.	(Netherlands) Hans Stringer	KO (Punch to the Body)	1	2:22	
Bantamweight 61 kg	(Russia) Magomed Ginazov	def.	(Ukraine) Alexander Pletenko	Decision (Unanimous)	3	5:00	
Heavyweight 120 kg	(France) Malik Merad	def.	(Russia) Isa Umarov	TKO (Punches)	2	4:04	
Lightweight 70 kg	(Russia) Rasul Shovkhalov	def.	(Ukraine) Vyacheslav Tan	TKO (Knees)	1	1:55	
Bantamweight 61 kg	(Russia) Murad Kalamov	def.	(Kazakhstan) Denis Mucnek	Submission (Flying Triangle Choke)	1	3:36	
Featherweight 65 kg	(Japan) Taichi Nakashima	def.	(Russia) Magomed Khamzaev	KO (Kick to the Body)	1	4:15	1^
Bantamweight 61 kg	(Czech Republic) Filip Macek	def.	(Russia) Khamid Sultanbiev	Submission (Kneebar)	3	3:12	
Lightweight 70 kg	(Russia) Alim Cherkesov	def.	(Russia) Abkerim Yunusov	TKO (Punches)	1	2:05	

== ACB KB 7: Bloody Night ==
ACB KB 7: Bloody Night
- Promotion: Absolute Championship Berkut
- Date: September 18, 2016
- Venue: Horia Demian Sports Hall
- City: Cluj-Napoca, Romania

Event chronology
ACB 45	ACB KB 7: Bloody Night	ACB 46

Absolute Championship Berkut Kickboxing 7: Bloody Night was a Kickboxing event held by Absolute Championship Berkut on September 18, 2016, at the Horia Demian Sports Hall in Cluj-Napoca, Romania.

=== Results ===
ACB 69
Weight Class				Method	Round	Time	Notes
KB Heavyweight 120 kg	(Romania) Benjamin Adegbuyi	def.	(Netherlands) Steve Reezigt	KO (Punch)	1		
KB Lightweight 70 kg	(Romania) Andrei Leuștean	def.	(Russia) Datsi Datsiev	Decision (Unanimous)	3		
KB Featherweight 66 kg	(Russia) Said Magomedov	def.	(Romania) Ștefan Irimia	Decision (Unanimous)	3		
KB Featherweight 66 kg	(Romania) Daniel Corbeanu	def.	(Serbia) Nemanja Skalic	KO (Punches)	1		
KB Light Heavyweight 95 kg	(Netherlands) Max van Gelder	def.	(Hungary) Imre Zsolt	Decision (Unanimous)	3		
KB Welterweight 77 kg	(Russia) Mansur Vaduev	def.	(Romania) Izidor Bunea	KO (Punches and Leg Kick)	2		
KB Featherweight 66 kg	(Russia) Zubaira Suleimanov	def.	(Romania) Rayko Levitchi	Decision (Split)	3		
KB Featherweight 66 kg	(Romania) Andrei Pisari	def.	(Turkey) Mustafa Kazmaz	Decision (Split)	3		
KB Featherweight 66 kg	(Netherlands) Darryl Verdonk	def.	(Romania) Bogdan Suru	KO (Spinning Backfist)	2		
KB Bantamweight 61 kg	(Ukraine) Konstantin Trishin	def.	(Romania) Marius Tolea	Decision (Unanimous)	3		
KB Bantamweight 61 kg	(Serbia) Slobodan Mitrovic	def.	(Romania) Sorin Tănăsie	Decision (Unanimous)	3		
KB Middleweight 84 kg	(Netherlands) Kevin van Heeckeren	def.	(Romania) Mircea Dumitrescu	KO (Punch)	4		
KB Featherweight 66 kg	(Russia) Arbi Mudaev	def.	(Romania) Andrei Verde	KO (Punch)	1		

== ACB 46: Olsztyński Legion - Young Eagles 13 ==
ACB 46: Olsztyński Legion - Young Eagles 13
- Promotion: Absolute Championship Berkut
- Date: September 24, 2016
- Venue: Hala Urania
- City: Olsztyn, Poland

Event chronology
ACB KB 7	ACB 46: Olsztyński Legion - Young Eagles 13	ACB 47

Absolute Championship Berkut 46: Olsztyński Legion - Young Eagles 13 was a mixed martial arts event held by Absolute Championship Berkut on September 24, 2016, at the Hala Urania in Olsztyn, Poland.

=== Results ===
Fight Card
Weight Class				Method	Round	Time	Notes
Lightweight 70 kg	(Russia) Islam Makoev	def.	(Poland) Adrian Zieliński	Submission (Guillotine Choke)	2	2:40	
Middleweight 84 kg	(Belarus) Igor Litoshik	def.	(Poland) Sylwester Borys	Submission (Guillotine Choke)	1	2:01	
Lightweight 70 kg	(Russia) Łukasz Rajewski	def.	(Russia) Rasul Yakhyaev	No Contest (Accidental Eye Poke)	1	1:37	
Lightweight 72 kg	(Russia) Ilyas Omarov	def.	(Russia) Usman Bisultanov	TKO (Punches)	2	4:07	
Light Heavyweight 93 kg	(Poland) Adam Kowalski	def.	(Slovakia) Pavol Langer	Decision (Unanimous)	3	5:00	
Middleweight 84 kg	(Ukraine) Baysangur Vakhitov	def.	(Iran) Mehrdad Janzemini	TKO (Corner Stoppage)	1	5:00	
Lightweight 70 kg	(Russia) Viskhan Magomadov	def.	(France) Farès Ziam	Submission (Rear Naked Choke)	1	3:58	
Featherweight 65 kg	(Armenia) Armen Stepanyan	def.	(Poland) Marcin Jabłoński	TKO (Punches)	1	0:32	
Bantamweight 61 kg	(Russia) Khusein Sheikhaev	def.	(Poland) Mateusz Juszczak	Submission (Rear Naked Choke)	2	2:12	
Bantamweight 61 kg	(Russia) Anzor Shakhmurzaev	def.	(England) Krystian Gowik	Decision (Unanimous)	3	5:00	
Light Heavyweight 93 kg	(Poland) Wojciech Giera	def.	(Russia) Mukhammad Kikishev	Decision (Unanimous)	3	5:00	
Welterweight 77 kg	(Russia) Daud Shaikhaev	def.	(Poland) Pawel Golebiewski	TKO (Retirement)	2	5:00	
Bantamweight 61 kg	(Russia) Akhmed Kukaev	def.	(Poland) Slawomir Szczepanski	Submission (Guillotine Choke)	1	0:50	

== ACB 47: Braveheart - Young Eagles 14 ==
ACB 47: Braveheart - Young Eagles 14
- Promotion: Absolute Championship Berkut
- Date: October 1, 2016
- Venue: The SSE Hydro
- City: Glasgow, Scotland

Event chronology
ACB 46	ACB 47: Braveheart - Young Eagles 14	ACB KB 8

Absolute Championship Berkut 47: Braveheart - Young Eagles 14 was a mixed martial arts event held by Absolute Championship Berkut on October 1, 2016, at the SSE Hydro in Glasgow, Scotland.

=== Results ===
Fight Card
Weight Class				Method	Round	Time	Notes
Catchweight 64 kg	(Scotland) Robert Whiteford	def.	(France) Kevin Petshi	Decision (Unanimous)	3	5:00	
Lightweight 70 kg	(England) Saul Rogers	def.	(Netherlands) Michel Adalena	Submission (Rear Naked Choke)	1	2:33	
Lightweight 70 kg	(England) Ryan Scope	def.	(Russia) Yusup Umarov	TKO (Punches)	2	2:16	
Featherweight 66 kg	(Russia) Said-Khamzat Avkhadov	def.	(England) James Brum	Decision (Unanimous)	3	5:00	
Lightweight 70 kg	(England) Norman Parke	def.	(England) Andrew Fisher	Decision (Unanimous)	3	5:00	
Lightweight 70 kg	(Switzerland) Michael Bobner	def.	(Russia) Magomed Raisov	TKO (Punches)	2	1:59	
Middleweight 84 kg	(Turkey) Ibragim Chuzhigaev	def.	(England) Lee Chadwick	TKO (Punches)	1	1:21	
Middleweight 84 kg	(England) Jake Bostwick	def.	(England) Danny Mitchell	KO (Punch)	1	3:53	
Featherweight 66 kg	(England) Daniel Crawford	def.	(Russia) Alikhan Suleimanov	TKO (Punches)	1	4:40	
Catchweight 64 kg	(England) Ed Arthur	def.	(England) Brent Crawley	Submission (Guillotine Choke)	2	0:37	
Welterweight 77 kg	(England) John Maguire	def.	(Scotland) Kieran Malone	Submission (Kimura)	3	4:31	
Lightweight 70 kg	(Wales) Gavin Hughes	def.	(Scotland) Chris Bungard	Submission (Guillotine Choke)	1	3:56	
Featherweight 66 kg	(Scotland) Callum Murrie	def.	(England) Jack Holt	Submission (Brabo Choke)	1	1:09	

== ACB KB 8: Only The Braves ==
ACB KB 8: Only The Braves
- Promotion: Absolute Championship Berkut
- Date: October 16, 2016
- Venue: Sportcomplex Koning Willem-Alexander
- City: Hoofddorp, Netherlands

Event chronology
ACB 47	ACB KB 8: Only The Braves	ACB 48

Absolute Championship Berkut Kickboxing 8: Only The Braves was a Kickboxing event held by Absolute Championship Berkut on October 16, 2016, at the Sportcomplex Koning Willem-Alexander in Hoofddorp, Netherlands.

=== Results ===
Fight Card
Weight Class				Method	Round	Notes
KB Light Heavyweight 95 kg	(Belarus) Igor Bugaenko	def.	(Cape Verde) Luis Tavares	Decision (Unanimous)	3	
KB Featherweight 66 kg	(Spain) David Mejia	def.	(Morocco) Zakaria Tijarti	Decision (Unanimous)	3	
KB Heavyweight 100 kg	(Belgium) Jamal Ben Saddik	def.	(Germany) Gordon Haupt	KO (Punch)	1	
KB Welterweight 77 kg	(Russia) Islam Beibatyrov	def.	(Germany) Sergej Braun	KO (Punch)	3	
KB Welterweight 77 kg	(China) Duoli Chen	def.	(Belarus) Yuri Bessmertny	Decision (Unanimous)	3	
KB Lightweight 70 kg	(Netherlands) Jordann Pikeur	def.	(Morocco) Brahim Kallah	TKO (Cut)	1	
KB Featherweight 66 kg	(Russia) Tamerlan Bashirov	def.	(Turkey) Mustafa Kazmaz	Decision (Unanimous)	3	
KB Lightweight 70 kg	(Morocco) Walid Hamid	def.	(Turkey) Hasan Toy	Decision (Unanimous)	3	
KB Lightweight 70 kg	(South Sudan) Lofogo Sarour	def.	(Morocco) Youssef el Haji	KO (Punch)	1	
KB Lightweight 70 kg	(Netherlands) Tyjani Beztati	def.	(Germany) Nuri Kacar	Decision (Unanimous)	3	
KB Welterweight 77 kg	(Iran) Akam Taraghe	def.	(Romania) Ciprian Șchiopu	Decision (Unanimous)	3	

== ACB 48: Revenge ==
ACB 48: Revenge
- Promotion: Absolute Championship Berkut
- Date: October 22, 2016
- Venue: Dynamo Palace of Sports in Krylatskoye
- City: Moscow, Russia

Event chronology
ACB KB 8	ACB 48: Revenge	ACB 49

Absolute Championship Berkut 48: Revenge was a mixed martial arts event held by Absolute Championship Berkut on October 22, 2016, at the Dynamo Palace of Sports in Krylatskoye in Moscow, Russia.

=== Results ===
Fight Card
Weight Class				Method	Round	Time	Notes
Lightweight 70 kg	(Russia) Abdul-Aziz Abdulvakhabov	def.	(Russia) Ali Bagov	TKO (Retirement)	1	5:00	For the ACB Lightweight Championship.
Flyweight 57 kg	(Russia) Askar Askarov	def.	(Brazil) José Maria Tomé	Submission (Brabo Choke)	5	1:57	For the Vacant ACB Flyweight Championship.
Middleweight 84 kg	(Russia) Michail Tsarev	def.	(Russia) Shamil Abdulkhalikov	Submission (Triangle Choke)	1	1:33	
Welterweight 77 kg	(Australia) Ben Alloway	def.	(Russia) Sergey Khandozhko	Submission (Rear Naked Choke)	3	3:09	
Light Heavyweight 93 kg	(Sweden) Max Nunes	def.	(Russia) Maxim Futin	TKO (Doctor Stoppage)	3	1:14	
Lightweight 70 kg	(Russia) Amirkhan Adaev	def.	(Brazil) Márcio Breno	Decision (Unanimous)	3	5:00	
Welterweight 77 kg	(Russia) Mukhamed Berkhamov	def.	(United States) Jesse Taylor	Submission (Armbar)	1	1:29	
Middleweight 84 kg	(Russia) Abdul-Rakhman Dzhanaev	def.	(Ukraine) Vasily Novikov	Decision (Unanimous)	3	5:00	
Welterweight 77 kg	(Russia) Stanislav Vlasenko	def.	(Moldova) Andrei Ciubotaru	Decision (Unanimous)	3	5:00	
Heavyweight 120 kg	(Russia) Mukhomad Vakhaev	def.	(Russia) Sergey Belostenniy	Submission (Rear Naked Choke)	1	4:10	
Flyweight 57 kg	(Ukraine) Ruslan Abiltarov	def.	(Poland) Marcin Lasota	Decision (Unanimous)	3	5:00	
Lightweight 70 kg	(Russia) Denis Kanakov	def.	(Russia) Abdul-Rakhman Makhazhiev	Disqualification (Timidity)	2	2:18	

== ACB 49: Rostov Onslaught ==
ACB 49: Rostov Onslaught
- Promotion: Absolute Championship Berkut
- Date: November 26, 2016
- Venue: Sport-Don Sports Palace
- City: Rostov-on-Don, Russia

Event chronology
ACB 48	ACB 49: Rostov Onslaught	ACB 50

Absolute Championship Berkut 49: Rostov Onslaught was a mixed martial arts event held by Absolute Championship Berkut on November 26, 2016, at the Sport-Don Sports Palace in Rostov-on-Don, Russia.

=== Background ===
Bonus awards:

The following fighters were awarded $5,000 bonuses:

- Fight of the Night: Eduard Vartanyan vs Alexandr Shabliy
- Knockout of the Night: Alexander Peduson
- Submission of the Night: Anthony Leone

=== Results ===
Fight Card
Weight Class				Method	Round	Time	Notes
Lightweight 70 kg	(Russia) Eduard Vartanyan	def.	(Russia) Alexandr Shabliy	Decision (Split)	3	5:00	
Welterweight 77 kg	(Russia) Beslan Isaev	def.	(United States) Steve Carl	Decision (Unanimous)	3	5:00	
Middleweight 84 kg	(Russia) Mikhail Kolobegov	def.	(Russia) Husein Kushagov	TKO (Punches)	1	2:13	
Bantamweight 61 kg	(Poland) Damian Szmigielski	def.	(Russia) Evgeniy Lazukov	KO (Punch)	1	2:49	
Flyweight 56 kg	(United States) Anthony Leone	def.	(Russia) Rasul Albaskhanov	Technical Submission (Guillotine Choke)	3	0:34	
Welterweight 77 kg	(Russia) Sharaf Davlatmurodov	def.	(Brazil) Joilton-Santos	Decision (Unanimous)	3	5:00	
Bantamweight 61 kg	(Russia) Maharbek Karginov	def.	(Brazil) Diego Marlon	KO (Elbows and Punches)	1	1:51	
Featherweight 65 kg	(Russia) Rasul Ediev	def.	(Czech Republic) Jaroslav Pokorny	Decision (Unanimous)	3	5:00	
Featherweight 65 kg	(Russia) Alexander Peduson	def.	(Peru) David Cubas	KO (fly knee)	2	1:17	
Bantamweight 61 kg	(Russia) Valeriy Khazhirokov	def.	(Georgia (country)) Soso Nizharadze	KO (head kick)	2	1:16	
Heavyweight 120 kg	(Russia) Khanif Mirzamagomedov	def.	(Russia) Artur Smirnov	Decision (Unanimous)	3	5:00	
Middleweight 84 kg	(Russia) Roman Kopylov	def.	(Russia) Islam Gugov	KO (Spinning Back Kick to the Body)	2	3:57	

== ACB 50: Stormbringer ==
ACB 50: Stormbringer
- Promotion: Absolute Championship Berkut
- Date: December 18, 2016
- Venue: Sibur Arena
- City: Saint Petersburg, Russia
- Attendance: 5,500

Event chronology
ACB 49	ACB 50: Stormbringer	ACB 51

Absolute Championship Berkut 50: Stormbringer was a mixed martial arts event held by Absolute Championship Berkut on December 18, 2016, at the Sibur Arena in Saint Petersburg, Russia.

=== Background ===
A Lightweight bout between Musa Khamanaev and Saul Rogers was scheduled for this card. However, the fight was cancelled in early December due to an injury sustained by Rogers, the bout will be Rescheduled.

Vyacheslav Vasilevsky Not Medically Cleared to fight, his bout with Albert Duraev was canceled.

Bonus awards:

The following fighters were awarded $10,000 bonuses:

- Fight of the Night: Marcelo Alfaya vs Beslan Isaev
- Knockout of the Night: Aleksei Butorin
- Submission of the Night: Magomed Magomedov

=== Results ===
Fight Card
Weight Class				Method	Round	Time	Notes
Heavyweight 120 kg	(Russia) Denis Goltsov	def.	(Russia) Salimgerey Rasulov (c)	Decision (Unanimous)	5	5:00	For the ACB Heavyweight Championship.
Welterweight 77 kg	(United States) Brett Cooper	def.	(Russia) Aslambek Saidov	TKO (Punches)	3	0:27	For the Vacant ACB Welterweight Championship
Bantamweight 61 kg	(Russia) Magomed Magomedov	def.	(Russia) Oleg Borisov	Submission (Guillotine Choke)	4	4:50	For the ACB Bantamweight Championship
Featherweight 66 kg	(Russia) Marat Balayev	def.	(Russia) Yusuf Raisov	Decision (Unanimous)	5	5:00	For the Vacant ACB Featherweight Championship
Welterweight 77 kg	(Brazil) Marcelo Alfaya	def.	(Russia) Beslan Isaev	Decision (Unanimous)	3	5:00	
Welterweight 77 kg	(Russia) Aleksei Butorin	def.	(England) Jake Bostwick	KO (Knee and Punch)	1	1:58	
Middleweight 84 kg	(Switzerland) Yasubey Enomoto	def.	(Kazakhstan) Igor Svirid	Decision (Unanimous)	3	5:00	
Lightweight 70 kg	(Russia) Alexander Sarnavskiy	def.	(Russia) Ramazan Esenbaev	TKO (Corner Stoppage)	3	3:49	
Featherweight 66 kg	(Russia) Adlan Bataev	def.	(United States) Donald Sanchez	Decision (Unanimous)	3	5:00	
Bantamweight 61 kg	(Azerbaijan) Tural Ragimov	def.	(England) Ed Arthur	Decision (Unanimous)	3	5:00	
Featherweight 66 kg	(Russia) Mukhamed Kokov	def.	(Brazil) Carlos Alexandre	Decision (Unanimous)	3	5:00	
Light Heavyweight 93 kg	(Russia) Ilya Sheglov	def.	(Brazil) Wallyson Carvalho	TKO (Punches)	2	4:45	
