= Fight Club Akhmat =

Russian sports club

- Est.: 2014; 12 years ago
- Founded by: Ramzan Kadyrov
- Primary owners: Ramzan Kadyrov
- Primary trainers: Murad Bichuev (head coach)
- Location: Grozny, Chechnya, Russia
- Website: https://rsk-akhmat.com

Fight Club Akhmat (FCA) is a professional sports club from the Chechen Republic and has training bases in the regions of Russia. It was founded in 2014 and named after the first president of the Chechen Republic in Russia — Akhmat Kadyrov.

== History ==
The Akhmat Sports Club was founded in mid-2014. It was named after the first President of Chechnya, Russia, Akhmat Kadyrov. The sports club belongs to the administration of the Chechen Republic. Ramzan Kadyrov is considered the owner of the club. Initially, the club was created to develop boxing talents. In time, the club gained momentum and began to grow and by the end of 2016 was considered to be one of the main sports clubs in Russia. Towards the end of 2016, the club's management decided to develop mixed martial arts (MMA) along with boxing.

In December 2018, Absolute Championship Berkut (ACB) leadership officially announced the merger of ACB and World Fighting Championship Akhmat into a single promotion called Absolute Championship Akhmat. Alexey Yatsenko, the former head of the Russian fighting organization Tech-KREP FC, became the president of the newly united promotion.

== Controversies ==
In July 2017, HBO's Real Sports released a documentary that revealed how Kadyrov uses the club to train members of the Kadyrovites although only a handful of them went on to become professional fighters.

In 2021, a Siberian journalist, Andrei Afanasyev was attacked outside his apartment by unknown assailants after investigating the club.

In 2022, the club was mentioned in a Telegram post by Ramzan Kadyrov that was addressed to Elon Musk stating he is offering to train him there to fight Vladimir Putin.

== Notable fighters ==
- Alexander Emelianenko
- Diana Avsaragova
- Fabricio Werdum
- Khamzat Chimaev
- Magomed Ankalaev
- Magomed Bibulatov
- Magomedrasul Khasbulaev
- Maxim Grishin
- Ruslan Magomedov
- Said Nurmagomedov
- Vitaly Bigdash

== Literature ==
- С-А. М. Аслаханов, Х. Х. Хизриев (2015). Физическая культура и спорт Чечни: истоки и современность. Москва: «Перо». pp. 120–121. ISBN 978-500086-997-0.

== See also ==
- List of Top Professional MMA Training Camps
