= Michail Tsarev =

Russian mixed martial arts fighter

Michail Tsarev Михаил Царев
- Born: June 22, 1986 (age 40); Novosibirsk, Russian SFSR, Soviet Union
- Other names: The Lone Wolf
- Nationality: Russian
- Height: 1.80 m (5 ft 11 in)
- Weight: 170 lb (77 kg; 12 st)
- Division: Welterweight; Middleweight
- Reach: 76 in (193 cm)
- Style: Sambo, Brazilian Jiu-Jitsu, Hand-to-hand combat, Pankration, Armeyskiy Rukopashniy Boy
- Fighting out of: Novosibirsk, Siberia, Russia
- Team: HB Ultimate Training Center; RusFighters Sport Club (Saturn Prof.MMA team)
- Rank: Master of Sports in Hand-to-hand combat
- Years active: 2005–2017; 2020–present

Mixed martial arts record
- Total: 42
- Wins: 33
- By knockout: 9
- By submission: 22
- By decision: 2
- Losses: 9
- By knockout: 6
- By submission: 3

Other information
- Mixed martial arts record from Sherdog

Michail Yuryevich Tsarev (Russian: Михаил Юрьевич Царев; born June 22, 1986) is a Russian mixed martial artist fighter in the welterweight division for the Bellator Fighting Championships.

== Mixed martial arts career ==
=== Early career ===
Tsarev made his professional debut in October 2005. Tsarev trains with Andrey Koreshkov, Alexander Sarnavskiy, Bellator veteran Alexander Shlemenko and with Sambo World Champion Vener Galiev.

His biggest victory to date was against American MMA fighter Kyacey Uscola via submission (triangle choke) in first round.

=== Bellator Fighting Championships ===
In August 2012, it was announced that Tsarev would make his U.S. debut for Bellator Fighting Championships.

Tsarev faced Tim Welch on September 28, 2012 at Bellator 74. This was the opening round of the season seven Welterweight tournament. He won via submission in the second round. He faced Lyman Good in the semifinals on October 26, 2012 at Bellator 78. He lost via controversial TKO in the second round as Tsarev said he had been poked in the right eye, but referee Greg Franklin did not acknowledge it.

Tsarev faced Douglas Lima in welterweight tournament on January 24, 2013 at Bellator 86 on Spike TV. He lost the fight via TKO due to brutal leg kicks in the second round.

=== Konfrontacja Sztuk Walki ===
Michail Tsarev is expected to face KSW welterweight champion Borys Mańkowski on February 21, 2015 at KSW 30. However, Tsarev pulled out of the fight in late-February citing an injury and was replaced by Norway's Mohsen Bahari.

=== League S-70 ===
Tsarev faced to Jesse Taylor on August 29, 2015 at League S-70: Russia vs. World. He lost the fight via submission (guillotine choke) in the first round.

=== Absolute Championship Berkut ===
Tsarev faced Albert Duraev for the ACB Welterweight belt on May 6, 2016, but he lost the fight via KO (punches) at the ACB 45: In Memory of Guram Gugenishvili in the first round.

Tsarev faced Shamil Abdulkhalikov on October 22, 2016 at ACB 48. He won the fight via submission in the first round.

== Championships and accomplishments ==
=== Pankration ===
- Russian Pankration Federation
  - Pankration Russian National Champion

=== Hand-to-hand combat ===
- Russian Union of Martial Arts
  - Hand-to-hand fight Russian National Champion

== Personal life ==
Tsarev has wife Inna.

== Mixed martial arts record ==
Professional record breakdown
42 matches	33 wins	9 losses
By knockout	9	6
By submission	22	3
By decision	2	0
Draws	0	

Res.	Record	Opponent	Method	Event	Date	Round	Time	Location	Notes
Loss	33–9	Vladimir Vasilyev	TKO (punches)	Open Fighting Championship 21	July 10, 2022	2	3:50	Saint Petersburg, Russia	
Win	33–8	Vladimir Ivashkin	Submission (kimura)	Open Fighting Championship 17	February 5, 2022	2	2:58	Barnaul, Russia	
Loss	32–8	Sergei Martynov	TKO (punches)	RCC: Intro 9	October 10, 2020	1	1:55	Ekaterinburg, Russia	Return to Middleweight.
Win	32–7	Artur Guseinov	TKO (punches and elbows)	Fight Nights Global 78: Tsarev vs. Guseinov	November 4, 2017	1	4:26	Samara, Russia	Light Heavyweight bout.
Loss	31–7	Piotr Strus	TKO (doctor stoppage)	ACB 53: Young Eagles 15	February 18, 2017	2	5:00	Olsztyn, Poland	Catchweight (194 lb) bout.
Win	31–6	Shamil Abdulkhalikov	Submission (triangle choke)	ACB 48: Revenge	October 22, 2016	1	1:32	Moscow, Russia	Middleweight bout.
Loss	30–6	Albert Duraev	KO (punches)	ACB 35: In Memory of Guram Gugenishvili	May 6, 2016	1	2:45	Tbilisi, Georgia	For the ACB Welterweight Championships.
Win	30–5	Artem Reznikov	Submission (guillotine choke)	Tech-Krep FC: Battle in Siberia	February 1, 2016	1	0:40	Novosibirsk, Russia	
Loss	29–5	Jesse Taylor	Submission (guillotine choke)	League S-70: Russia vs. World	August 29, 2015	1	0:40	Sochi, Krasnodar krai, Russia	Return to Welterweight.
Win	29–4	Dennis Hallman	TKO (punches)	ProFC 56	November 1, 2014	1	2:45	Kaliningrad, Kaliningrad oblast, Russia	
Win	28–4	Xavier Foupa-Pokam	TKO (punches)	FEFoMP: Mayor Cup 2014	May 17, 2014	1	4:56	Khabarovsk, Khabarovsk Krai, Russia	
Win	27–4	Charles Andrade	TKO (body kick)	ProFC 51	November 12, 2013	1	3:35	Kaliningrad, Kaliningrad oblast, Russia	
Win	26–4	Robert Sarkozi	TKO (punches)	White Rex: The Birth of a Nation	October 4, 2013	1	2:06	Moscow, Moscow oblast, Russia	Return to Middleweight.
Win	25–4	Jaime Jara	TKO (punches)	League S-70: Plotforma	August 17, 2013	1	0:39	Sochi, Krasnodar krai, Russia	Catchweight (181 lb) bout.
Loss	24–4	Douglas Lima	TKO (leg kicks)	Bellator 86	January 24, 2013	2	1:44	Thackerville, Oklahoma, United States	Bellator Season 8 Welterweight Tournament quarterfinal.
Loss	24–3	Lyman Good	TKO (punches)	Bellator 78	October 26, 2012	2	3:54	Dayton, Ohio, United States	Bellator Season 7 Welterweight Tournament semifinal.
Win	24–2	Tim Welch	Submission (rear-naked choke)	Bellator 74	September 28, 2012	2	1:57	Atlantic City, New Jersey, United States	Bellator Season 7 Welterweight Tournament quarterfinal. Return to Welterweight.
Win	23–2	Kyacey Uscola	Submission (triangle choke)	BF - Baltic Challenge 3	February 23, 2012	1	1:12	Kaliningrad, Kaliningrad Oblast, Russia	
Win	22–2	Rasul Magamedov	Submission (triangle choke)	League S-70 - Russian Championship Second Round	February 18, 2012	1	3:22	Omsk, Omsk Oblast, Russia	
Win	21–2	Deyan Topalski	KO (head kick)	Union of Veterans of Sport - Russia vs. Europe	November 19, 2011	1	0:15	Novosibirsk, Novosibirsk Oblast, Russia	
Win	20–2	Abdulsupyan Alikhanov	TKO (pucnhes)	ProFC: Battle on the Caucasus	October 22, 2011	1	N\A	Khasavyurt, Republic of Dagestan, Russia	
Win	19–2	Shamil Abdulkhalikov	Submission (rear-naked choke)	Pankration Cup of Call: Siberia vs. Caucasus	February 12, 2011	1	3:21	Omsk, Omsk Oblast, Russia	Welterweight bout.
Win	18–2	Shamil Abdulkhalikov	Submission (armbar)	ProFC 22	December 17, 2010	2	2:30	Rostov-on-Don, Rostov Oblast, Russia	Won the ProFC Middleweight Tournament.
Win	17–2	Bagautdin Sharaputdinov	Submission (triangle choke)	ProFC 21	November 28, 2010	1	1:50	Ufa, Republic of Bashkortostan, Russia	ProFC Middleweight Semi-Finals.
Win	16–2	Omari Akhmedov	Submission (guillotine choke)	ProFC 21	November 28, 2010	2	4:29	Ufa, Republic of Bashkortostan, Russia	ProFC Middleweight Quarter-Finals.
Win	15–2	Magomed Eldiev	Technical Submission (triangle choke)	Golden Fist Russia	June 10, 2010	2	0:41	Moscow, Moscow Oblast, Russia	Welterweight bout.
Win	14–2	Sergey Naumov	Submission (rear-naked choke)	Siberian League: Siberia vs. Ural	April 26, 2010	1	0:56	Novokuznetsk, Kemerovo Oblast, Russia	
Loss	13–2	Gustavo Picone	Submission (rear-naked choke)	IAFC: Russia vs. the World	November 29, 2008	1	2:25	Novosibirsk, Novosibirsk, Russia	
Loss	13–1	Gadji Zaipulaev	Submission (choke)	Siberian Challenge 2	May 18, 2008	1	N/A	Bratsk, Irkutsk Oblast, Russia	Lightweight bout.
Win	13–0	Pavel Semenov	Submission (rear-naked choke)	WUFC: Championship of Siberia in Pankration	March 30, 2008	1	1:02	Berdsk, Novosibirsk Oblast, Russia	
Win	12–0	Maxim Motodoev	KO (punch)	Siberian Challenge 1	October 14, 2007	1	N/A	Brats, Irkutsk Oblast, Russia	
Win	11–0	Pavel Kuchumov	Decision (unanimous)	WUFC: Championship of Siberia in Pankration	July 12, 2007	2	5:00	Mezhdurechensk, Kemerovo Oblast, Russia	
Win	10–0	Karen Avetisyan	Submission (armbar)	WUFC: Russia vs. USA	May 9, 2007	1	0:56	Barnaul, Altai Krai, Russia	Welterweight bout.
Win	9–0	Edgar Kolyan	Submission (choke)	WUFC: Resistance	November 20, 2006	N/A	N/A	Novosibirsk, Novosibirsk Oblast, Russia	Return to Middleweight.
Win	8–0	Denis Evseev	Submission (armbar)	WUFC: Championship of Russia in Professional Pankration	April 9, 2006	1	1:10	Novosibirsk, Novosibirsk Oblast, Russia	
Win	7–0	Kardash Fatakhov	Submission (armbar)	WUFC: Championship of Russia in Professional Pankration	April 9, 2006	1	3:00	Novosibirsk, Novosibirsk Oblast, Russia	Lightweight debut.
Win	6–0	Yuri Folomkin	Decision (unanimous)	WUFC - Gladiators Challenge 4th Stage	January 20, 2006	2	5:00	Novosibirsk, Novosibirsk Oblast, Russia	
Win	5–0	Vladimir Startsev	Submission (guillotine choke)	WUFC - Gladiators Challenge 4th Stage	January 20, 2006	1	1:13	Novosibirsk, Novosibirsk Oblast, Russia	
Win	4–0	Igor Bayer	Submission (rear-naked choke)	WUFC: Championship of Novosibirsk in Professional Pankration	November 20, 2005	1	4:55	Novosibirsk, Novosibirsk Oblast, Russia	
Win	3–0	Alexey Pavlov	Submission (guillotine choke)	WUFC: Championship of Novosibirsk in Professional Pankration	November 20, 2005	1	0:45	Novosibirsk, Novosibirsk Oblast, Russia	
Win	2–0	Gennady Karnaukhov	Submission (armbar)	WUFC: Gladiators Challenge 2nd Stage	November 6, 2005	1	6:12	Krasnoyarsk, Krasnoyarsk Krai, Russia	Middleweight debut.
Win	1–0	Ruslan Magomedov	Submission (armbar)	WUFC: Gladiators Challenge 1st Stage	October 6, 2005	1	1:05	Krasnoyarsk, Krasnoyarsk Krai, Russia	Welterweight debut.
