= 2014 in Absolute Championship Berkut =

Mixed martial arts events

Information
- First date: March 2, 2014
- Last date: November 15, 2014

Events
- Total events: 13

The year 2014 was the second year in the history of the Absolute Championship Berkut, a mixed martial arts promotion based in Russia. 2014 started with Absolute Championship Berkut 1. It started broadcasting through a television agreement with Match TV.

== List of events ==
=== Mixed martial arts ===
#	Event title	Date	Arena	Location
1	ACB 1: Grand Prix Berkut 2014	March 2, 2014	Fight club Berkut	Grozny, Russia
2	ACB 2: Grand Prix Berkut 2014	March 9, 2014	Fight club Berkut	Grozny, Russia
3	ACB 3: Grand Prix Berkut 2014	March 16, 2014	Fight club Berkut	Grozny, Russia
4	ACB 4: Grand Prix Berkut 2014	March 30, 2014	Fight club Berkut	Grozny, Russia
5	ACB 5: Grand Prix Berkut 2014	April 6, 2014	Fight club Berkut	Grozny, Russia
6	ACB 6: Grand Prix Berkut 2014	April 20, 2014	Fight club Berkut	Grozny, Russia
7	ACB 7: Grand Prix Berkut 2014	May 18, 2014	Fight club Berkut	Grozny, Russia
8	ACB 8: Grand Prix Berkut 2014	May 25, 2014	Fight club Berkut	Grozny, Russia
9	ACB 9: Grand Prix Berkut 2014	June 22, 2014	Fight club Berkut	Grozny, Russia
10	ACB 10: Coliseum Time	October 4, 2014	Arena Coliseum	Grozny, Russia
11	ACB 11: Vol. 1	November 14, 2014	Arena Coliseum	Grozny, Russia
12	ACB 11: Vol. 2	November 15, 2014	Arena Coliseum	Grozny, Russia
13	M-1 Challenge 54 / ACB 12	December 17, 2014	Ice Palace	Saint Petersburg, Russia

== ACB 1: Grand Prix Berkut 2014 ==
ACB 1: Grand Prix Berkut 2014
- Promotion: Absolute Championship Berkut
- Date: March 2, 2014
- Venue: Fight Club Berkut
- City: Grozny, Russia

Absolute Championship Berkut 1: Grand Prix Berkut 2014 was a mixed martial arts event held by Absolute Championship Berkut on March 2, 2014, at the Fight club Berkut in Grozny, Russia.

=== Results ===
Fight Card
Weight Class				Method	Round	Time	Notes
Bantamweight 61 kg	(Russia) Yusup Saadulaev	vs.	(Russia) Magomed Ginazov	No Contest	3	5:00	
Featherweight 66 kg	(Kyrgyzstan) Maksatbek Uulu Ularbek	def.	(Russia) Timur Gagaev	TKO (Corner Stoppage)	2	4:16	
Featherweight 66 kg	(Russia) Khalid Yunusov	def.	(Russia) Tamerlan Kabulov	KO (Punch)	1	2:13	
Featherweight 66 kg	(Kazakhstan) Erzhan Estanov	def.	(Russia) Guseyn Rizaev	Submission (Rear-Naked Choke)	2	1:50	
Featherweight 66 kg	(Russia) Salman Zhamaldaev	def.	(Uzbekistan) Zafar Salimov	Submission (Rear-Naked Choke)	1	1:55	
Featherweight 66 kg	(Lithuania) Sergej Grecicho	def.	(Russia) Rasul Albaskhanov	Submission (Guillotine Choke)	2	0:48	
Featherweight 66 kg	(Russia) Magomed Alhasov	def.	(Russia) Rustam Magomedov	TKO (Doctor Stoppage)	1	5:00	
Featherweight 66 kg	(Russia) Rakhman Dudaev	def.	(Azerbaijan) Ekhtiram Darishev	Decision (Unanimous)	3	5:00	
Featherweight 66 kg	(Tajikistan) Aziz Khaydarov	def.	(Latvia) Vitalijs Melnikovs	Submission (Rear-Naked Choke)	1	0:29	
Bantamweight 61 kg	(Russia) Said Nurmagomedov	def.	(Kazakhstan) Asulan Toktarbaev	Decision (Unanimous)	2	5:00	
Bantamweight 61 kg	(Russia) Yusup Raisov	def.	(Russia) Vyacheslav Gagiev	Decision (Split)	3	5:00	
Bantamweight 61 kg	(Armenia) German Barsegyan	def.	(Russia) Khasan Galaev	Decision (Unanimous)	2	5:00	
Bantamweight 61 kg	(Russia) Ismail Mazhiev	def.	(Latvia) Yuriy Davydov	Submission (Achilles Lock)	2	2:02	
Bantamweight 61 kg	(Russia) Yusup Saadulaev	def.	(Tajikistan) Firdavs Zaripov	Submission (Rear-Naked Choke)	1	1:40	
Bantamweight 61 kg	(Russia) Magomed Ginazov	def.	(Russia) Magomed Gitinov	Submission (Armbar)	1	2:40	
Bantamweight 61 kg	(Azerbaijan) Bairam Shammadov	def.	(Latvia) Vyacheslav Skreivers	Submission (Rear-Naked Choke)	1	1:40	
Bantamweight 61 kg	(Russia) Shamil Shakhbulatov	def.	(Uzbekistan) Nuri Bakirdinov	TKO (Corner Stoppage)	2	3:54	

== ACB 2: Grand Prix Berkut 2014 ==
ACB 2: Grand Prix Berkut 2014
- Promotion: Absolute Championship Berkut
- Date: March 9, 2014
- Venue: Fight club Berkut
- City: Grozny, Russia

Absolute Championship Berkut 2: Grand Prix Berkut 2014 was a mixed martial arts event held by Absolute Championship Berkut on March 9, 2014, at the Fight club Berkut in Grozny, Russia.

=== Results ===
Fight Card
Weight Class				Method	Round	Time	Notes
Welterweight 77 kg	(Russia) Beslan Isaev	def.	(Uzbekistan) Khasankhon Baratov	KO (Knee)	1	0:13	
Welterweight 77 kg	(Russia) Ibragim Tibilov	def.	(Azerbaijan) Nariman Abbasov	Submission (Rear-Naked Choke)	1	4:59	
Welterweight 77 kg	(Russia) Magomed Magomedkerimov	def.	(Russia) Islam Yashaev	TKO (Doctor Stoppage)	1	0:15	
Welterweight 77 kg	(Kyrgyzstan) Daniyar Babakulov	def.	(Russia) Daud Shaikhaev	Decision (Split)	2	5:00	
Welterweight 77 kg	(Russia) Eldarhan Machukaev	def.	(Russia) Yusup Gadjiomarov	Submission (Triangle Choke)	1	2:28	
Welterweight 77 kg	(Russia) Bagautdin Sharaputdinov	def.	(Latvia) Didzis Verbickis	Submission (Rear-Naked Choke)	1	1:31	
Welterweight 77 kg	(Russia) Usman Bisultanov	def.	(Russia) Ibragim Visurov	Submission (Armbar)	1	1:02	
Welterweight 77 kg	(Kazakhstan) Mahir Mamedov	def.	(Russia) Guseyn Omarov	Submission (Guillotine Choke)	1	0:38	
Lightweight 70 kg	(Russia) Lom-Ali Nalgiev	def.	(Latvia) Aleksander Skreivers	Submission (Armbar)	1	0:58	
Lightweight 70 kg	(Russia) Abdulla Almurzaev	def.	(Russia) Timur Esanukaev	KO (Knee)	2	2:11	
Lightweight 70 kg	(Russia) Arsen Ubaidulaev	def.	(Russia) Sheikh Murtuzaliev	Submission (Anaconda Choke)	1	1:21	
Lightweight 70 kg	(Russia) Islam Makoev	def.	(Uzbekistan) Sirozhiddin Eshanbaev	Submission (Rear-Naked Choke)	1	2:34	
Lightweight 70 kg	(Russia) Ali Bagov	def.	(Russia) Akhmed Mirzaev	Submission (Anaconda Choke)	1	1:01	
Lightweight 70 kg	(Kyrgyzstan) Rasul Mansurov	def.	(Russia) Umar Chichaev	Submission (Shoulder Choke)	2	3:16	
Lightweight 70 kg	(Russia) Mukhamed Kokov	def.	(Russia) Dzhihad Yunusov	Submission (Rear-Naked Choke)	2	1:12	
Lightweight 70 kg	(Russia) Ermek Tlauov	def.	(Russia) Sayd-Hamzat Avkhadov	Submission (Armbar)	1	1:41	

== ACB 3: Grand Prix Berkut 2014 ==
ACB 3: Grand Prix Berkut 2014
- Promotion: Absolute Championship Berkut
- Date: March 16, 2014
- Venue: Fight club Berkut
- City: Grozny, Russia

Absolute Championship Berkut 3: Grand Prix Berkut 2014 was a mixed martial arts event held by Absolute Championship Berkut on March 16, 2014, at the Fight club Berkut in Grozny, Russia.

Fight Card
Weight Class				Method	Round	Time	Notes
Light Heavyweight	(Russia) Ruslan Khaskhanov	def.	(Latvia) Igors Zauers	Submission (Heel Hook)	1	1:20	R16
Light Heavyweight	(Russia) Gadzhimurad Antigulov	def.	(Russia) Ilya Kolodyazhny	TKO (punches)	1	0:47	R16
Light Heavyweight	(Uzbekistan) Muzaffar Radzhabov	def.	(Russia) Sarmat Gigolaev	TKO (punches)	1	2:20	R16
Light Heavyweight	(Russia) Alikhan Vakhaev	def.	(Tajikistan) Aidi Usainov	Subsmission (rear naked choke)	1	3:08	R16
Light Heavyweight	(Russia) Husein Kushagov	def.	(Russia) Amirkhan Guliev	Decision (unanimous)	2	5:00	R16
Light Heavyweight	(Russia) Ramzan Genteev	def.	(Russia) Oleg Kutepov	Decision (unanimous)	2	5:]0	R16
Light Heavyweight	(Russia) Rasim Kurbanismailov	def.	(Tajikistan) Dilovar Nasirov	TKO (punches)	1	2:58	R16
Light Heavyweight	(Belarus) Igor Litoshik	def.	(Tajikistan) Dilovar Nasirov	Submission (rear-naked choke)	1	0:48	R16
Light Heavyweight	(Russia) Islam Edilgeriev	def.	(Russia) Anton Uberg	Submission (triangle choke)	1	3:56	R16
Light Heavyweight	(Russia) Beslan Ushukov	def.	(Russia) Artur Guseinov	Submission (rear-naked choke)	2	1:22	R16
Light Heavyweight	(Kazakhstan) Ramzan Algeriev	def.	(Moldova) Pavel Pokatilov	Submission (heel hook)	1	0:32	R16
Light Heavyweight	(Russia) Shamkhan Barakhanov	def.	(Tajikistan) Islom Alizoda	Decision (unanimous)	3	5:00	R16
Light Heavyweight	(Russia) Sayfulla Yakubov	def.	(Kyrgyzstan) Erbolat Boldzhiev	Submission (rear-naked choke)	1	3:15	R16
Light Heavyweight	(Russia) Ahmed Askhabov	def.	(Latvia) Nikolay Karpachov	TKO (punches)	1	4:16	R16
Light Heavyweight	(Kazakhstan) Igor Svirid	def.	(Turkey) Ibragim Chuzhigaev	Decision (split)	2	5:00	R16
Light Heavyweight	(Russia) Muslim Khizriev	def.	(Uzbekistan) Khusan Baratov	Submission (injury)	1	0:24	R16

== ACB 4: Grand Prix Berkut 2014 ==
ACB 4: Grand Prix Berkut 2014
- Promotion: Absolute Championship Berkut
- Date: March 30, 2014
- Venue: Fight club Berkut
- City: Grozny, Russia

Absolute Championship Berkut 4: Grand Prix Berkut 2014 was a mixed martial arts event held by Absolute Championship Berkut on March 30, 2014, at the Fight club Berkut in Grozny, Russia.

== ACB 5: Grand Prix Berkut 2014 ==
ACB 5: Grand Prix Berkut 2014
- Promotion: Absolute Championship Berkut
- Date: April 6, 2014
- Venue: Fight club Berkut
- City: Grozny, Russia

Absolute Championship Berkut 5: Grand Prix Berkut 2014 was a mixed martial arts event held by Absolute Championship Berkut on April 6, 2014, at the Fight club Berkut in Grozny, Russia.

== ACB 6: Grand Prix Berkut 2014 ==
ACB 6: Grand Prix Berkut 2014
- Promotion: Absolute Championship Berkut
- Date: April 20, 2014
- Venue: Fight club Berkut
- City: Grozny, Russia

Absolute Championship Berkut 6: Grand Prix Berkut 2014 was a mixed martial arts event held by Absolute Championship Berkut on April 20, 2014, at the Fight club Berkut in Grozny, Russia.

== ACB 7: Grand Prix Berkut 2014 ==
ACB 7: Grand Prix Berkut 2014
- Promotion: Absolute Championship Berkut
- Date: May 18, 2014
- Venue: Fight club Berkut
- City: Grozny, Russia

Absolute Championship Berkut 7: Grand Prix Berkut 2014 was a mixed martial arts event held by Absolute Championship Berkut on May 18, 2014, at the Fight club Berkut in Grozny, Russia.

== ACB 8: Grand Prix Berkut 2014 ==
ACB 8: Grand Prix Berkut 2014
- Promotion: Absolute Championship Berkut
- Date: May 25, 2014
- Venue: Fight club Berkut
- City: Grozny, Russia

Absolute Championship Berkut 8: Grand Prix Berkut 2014 was a mixed martial arts event held by Absolute Championship Berkut on May 25, 2014, at the Fight club Berkut in Grozny, Russia.

== ACB 9: Grand Prix Berkut 2014 ==
ACB 9: Grand Prix Berkut 2014
- Promotion: Absolute Championship Berkut
- Date: June 22, 2014
- Venue: Fight club Berkut
- City: Grozny, Russia

Absolute Championship Berkut 9: Grand Prix Berkut 2014 was a mixed martial arts event held by Absolute Championship Berkut on June 22, 2014, at the Fight club Berkut in Grozny, Russia.

== ACB 10: Coliseum Time ==
ACB 10: Coliseum Time
- Promotion: Absolute Championship Berkut
- Date: October 4, 2014
- Venue: Fight club Berkut
- City: Grozny, Russia

Absolute Championship Berkut 10: Coliseum Time was a mixed martial arts event held by Absolute Championship Berkut on October 4, 2014, at the Fight club Berkut in Grozny, Russia.

== ACB 11: Vol. 1 ==
ACB 11: Vol. 1
- Promotion: Absolute Championship Berkut
- Date: November 14, 2014
- Venue: Fight club Berkut
- City: Grozny, Russia

Absolute Championship Berkut 11: Vol. 1 was a mixed martial arts event held by Absolute Championship Berkut on November 14, 2014, at the Fight club Berkut in Grozny, Russia.

== ACB 11: Vol. 2 ==
ACB 11: Vol. 2
- Promotion: Absolute Championship Berkut
- Date: November 15, 2014
- Venue: Fight club Berkut
- City: Grozny, Russia

Absolute Championship Berkut 11: Vol. 2 was a mixed martial arts event held by Absolute Championship Berkut on November 15, 2014, at the Fight club Berkut in Grozny, Russia.

== M-1 Challenge 54 / ACB 12 ==
M-1 Challenge 54 / ACB 12
- Promotion: Absolute Championship Berkut
- Date: December 17, 2014
- Venue: Ice Palace
- City: Saint Petersburg, Russia

M-1 Challenge 54 / Absolute Championship Berkut 12 was a mixed martial arts event held by M-1 Global and Absolute Championship Berkut on December 17, 2014, at the Ice Palace in Saint Petersburg, Russia.
