= Tsareva Polyana =

- Village
- Location within Bulgaria
- Coordinates: 41°47′N 25°36′E
- Country: Bulgaria
- Province: Haskovo Province
- Municipality: Stambolovo
- Time zone: UTC+2 (EET)
  - Summer (DST): UTC+3 (EEST)

Tsareva Polyana is a village in Stambolovo Municipality, in Haskovo Province, in southern Bulgaria.
