= Andrei Tsaryov (1977) =

Russian ice hockey player

- Born: January 8, 1977 (age 48); Kazan, Russian SFSR, Soviet Union
- Height: 5 ft 11 in (180 cm)
- Weight: 181 lb (82 kg; 12 st 13 lb)
- Position: Right wing
- Shot: Left
- Played for: Ak Bars Kazan; HC Neftekhimik Nizhnekamsk; HC Lada Togliatti; Torpedo Nizhny Novgorod; Amur Khabarovsk; Kazakhmys Satpaev; Barys Nur-Sultan; HC Izhstal; Ariada Volzhsk
- Playing career: 1993–2012

Andrei Tsaryov (born January 8, 1977) is a Russian former professional ice hockey forward, who became a coach after completing his career as a player.

== Awards and honors ==
Award	Year
RSL
Winner (Ak Bars Kazan)	1998
Kazakhstan Hockey Championship
Winner (Barys Nur-Sultan)	2008|
