= Prigorodny (rural locality) =

Prigorodny (Russian: При́городный; masculine), Prigorodnaya/Prigorodnyaya (При́городная/Пригоро́дняя; feminine), or Prigorodnoye (При́городное; neuter) is the name of several rural localities in Russia:

- Prigorodny, Barnaul, Altai Krai, a settlement in Vlasikhinskaya Settlement Administration of the city of krai significance of Barnaul, Altai Krai
- Prigorodny, Biysky District, Altai Krai, a settlement in Malougrenevsky Selsoviet of Biysky District of Altai Krai
- Prigorodny, Astrakhan Oblast, a settlement in Solyansky Selsoviet of Narimanovsky District of Astrakhan Oblast
- Prigorodny, Chelyabinsk Oblast, a settlement under the administrative jurisdiction of the town of Kasli, Kaslinsky District, Chelyabinsk Oblast
- Prigorodny, Kemerovo Oblast, a settlement in Yasnogorskaya Rural Territory of Kemerovsky District of Kemerovo Oblast
- Prigorodny, Kirov Oblast, a settlement in Chepetsky Rural Okrug of Kirovo-Chepetsky District of Kirov Oblast
- Prigorodny, Krasnoyarsk Krai, a settlement in Znamensky Selsoviet of Minusinsky District of Krasnoyarsk Krai
- Prigorodny, Kursk Oblast, a settlement in Zorinsky Selsoviet of Oboyansky District of Kursk Oblast
- Prigorodny, Leningrad Oblast, a logging depot settlement in Novosvetskoye Settlement Municipal Formation of Gatchinsky District of Leningrad Oblast
- Prigorodny, Moscow Oblast, a settlement in Malodubenskoye Rural Settlement of Orekhovo-Zuyevsky District of Moscow Oblast
- Prigorodny, Novosibirsk Oblast, a settlement in Cherepanovsky District of Novosibirsk Oblast
- Prigorodny, Orenburg Oblast, a settlement in Prigorodny Selsoviet of Orenburgsky District of Orenburg Oblast
- Prigorodny, Pskov Oblast, a village in Dnovsky District of Pskov Oblast
- Prigorodny, Rostov Oblast, a settlement in Udarnikovskoye Rural Settlement of Krasnosulinsky District of Rostov Oblast
- Prigorodny, Sakha Republic, a selo in Khatassky Rural Okrug of Yakutsk, Sakha Republic
- Prigorodny, Saratov Oblast, a settlement in Petrovsky District of Saratov Oblast
- Prigorodny, Tambov Oblast, a settlement in Kryukovsky Selsoviet of Morshansky District of Tambov Oblast
- Prigorodny, Belsky District, Tver Oblast, a settlement in Belsky District, Tver Oblast
- Prigorodny, Vyshnevolotsky District, Tver Oblast, a settlement in Vyshnevolotsky District, Tver Oblast
- Prigorodny, Ulyanovsk Oblast, a settlement under the administrative jurisdiction of Zheleznodorozhny City District of the city of oblast significance of Ulyanovsk, Ulyanovsk Oblast
- Prigorodny, Vladimir Oblast, a selo in Yuryev-Polsky District of Vladimir Oblast
- Prigorodny, Volgograd Oblast, a settlement in Prigorodny Selsoviet of Frolovsky District of Volgograd Oblast
- Prigorodny, Voronezh Oblast, a settlement in Prigorodnoye Rural Settlement of Kalacheyevsky District of Voronezh Oblast
- Prigorodnoye, Altai Krai, a selo in Prigorodny Selsoviet of Slavgorodsky District of Altai Krai
- Prigorodnoye, Amur Oblast, a selo in Prigorodny Rural Settlement of Belogorsky District of Amur Oblast
- Prigorodnoye, Chechen Republic, a selo in Groznensky District of the Chechen Republic
- Prigorodnoye, Republic of Dagestan, a selo in Kizlyarsky Selsoviet of Kizlyarsky District of the Republic of Dagestan
- Prigorodnoye, Ivanovo Oblast, a selo in Rodnikovsky District of Ivanovo Oblast
- Prigorodnoye, Gvardeysky District, Kaliningrad Oblast, a settlement under the administrative jurisdiction of Gvardeysk Town of District Significance, Gvardeysky District, Kaliningrad Oblast
- Prigorodnoye, Nesterovsky District, Kaliningrad Oblast, a settlement in Prigorodny Rural Okrug of Nesterovsky District of Kaliningrad Oblast
- Prigorodnoye, Slavsky District, Kaliningrad Oblast, a settlement under the administrative jurisdiction of Slavsk Town of District Significance, Slavsky District, Kaliningrad Oblast
- Prigorodnoye, Karachay-Cherkess Republic, a selo in Prikubansky District of the Karachay-Cherkess Republic
- Prigorodnoye, Republic of Mordovia, a selo in Starozubarevsky Selsoviet of Krasnoslobodsky District of the Republic of Mordovia
- Prigorodnoye, Penza Oblast, a selo in Prigorodny Selsoviet of Serdobsky District of Penza Oblast
- Prigorodnaya, a village in Makarovsky Rural Okrug of Rybinsky District of Yaroslavl Oblast
- Prigorodnyaya, a sloboda in Prigorodnensky Selsoviet of Shchigrovsky District, Kursk Oblast
