= Prigorodny =

Prigorodny (masculine), Prigorodnaya (feminine), or Prigorodnoye (neuter) may refer to:

- Prigorodny District, name of several districts in Russia
- Prigorodny (rural locality) (Prigorodnaya, Prigorodnoye), name of several rural localities in Russia
- Prigorodnoye (seaport), a seaport in Sakhalin Oblast, Russia
- Prigorodnoye, Kyrgyzstan, a village in Chüy Region, Kyrgyzstan
