= 2021 in Absolute Championship Akhmat =

Mixed martial arts events

Information
- First date: February 12, 2021

Events
- Total events: 26
- ACA: 18
- Young eagles: 8

Fights
- Title fights: 10

The year 2021 was the ninth year in the history of the Absolute Championship Akhmat, a mixed martial arts promotion based in Russia.

== List of events ==
ACA MMA
No.	Event	Date	Venue	Location
1	ACA 117: Bagov vs. Silvério	February 12, 2021	WOW Arena	Sochi, Russia
2	ACA 118: Abdulaev vs. Vagaev 2	February 26, 2021	Basket Hall Moscow	Moscow, Russia
3	ACA 119: Frolov vs. da Silva	March 12, 2021	Basket-Hall Krasnodar	Krasnodar, Russia
4	ACA 120: Oliveira vs. Bibulatov	March 26, 2021	Sibur Arena	Saint Petersburg, Russia
5	ACA 121: Dipchikov vs. Gasanov	April 9, 2021	Falcon Arena	Minsk, Belarus
6	ACA 122: Johnson vs. Poberezhets	April 23, 2021	Falcon Arena	Minsk, Belarus
7	ACA 123: Koshkin vs. Butenko	May 28, 2021	CSKA Arena	Moscow, Russia
8	ACA 124: Galiev vs. Batista	June 11, 2021	TatNeft Arena	Kazan, Russia
9	ACA 125: Dudaev vs. de Lima	June 29, 2021	Bolshoy Ice Dome	Sochi, Russia
10	ACA 126: Magomedov vs. Egemberdiev	July 16, 2021	Bolshoy Ice Dome	Sochi, Russia
11	ACA 127: Kerefov vs. Albaskhanov	August 28, 2021	Basket-Hall Krasnodar	Krasnodar, Russia
12	ACA 128: Goncharov vs. Omielańczuk	September 11, 2021	Falcon Arena	Minsk, Belarus
13	ACA 129: Sarnavskiy VS. Magomedov	September 24, 2021	Dynamo Palace of Sports	Moscow, Russia
14	ACA 130: Dudaev vs. Praia	October 4, 2021	Sports Hall Coliseum	Grozny, Russia
15	ACA 131: Abdulvakhabov vs. Dias	November 5, 2021	Sports Hall Coliseum	Moscow, Russia
16	ACA 132: Johnson vs. Vakhaev	November 18, 2021	Falcon Arena	Minsk, Belarus
17	ACA 133: Magomedov vs. Matevosyan	December 4, 2021	Sibur Arena	Saint Petersburg, Russia
18	ACA 134: Bagov vs. Koshkin	December 17, 2021	Basket-Hall Krasnodar	Krasnodar, Russia

ACA Young Eagles
No.	Event	Date	Venue	Location
1	ACA YE 16: Grand Prix	January 30, 2021	Tolstoy-Yurt Arena	Tolstoy-Yurt, Russia
2	ACA YE 17: Grand Prix	February 20, 2021	Tolstoy-Yurt Arena	Tolstoy-Yurt, Russia
3	ACA YE 18: Grand Prix 1/4 Finals	April 12, 2021	Tolstoy-Yurt Arena	Tolstoy-Yurt, Russia
4	ACA YE 19: Saidulaev vs. Nurzhanov	July 24, 2021	Tolstoy-Yurt Arena	Tolstoy-Yurt, Russia
5	ACA YE 20: Grand Prix Semi-Finals	July 24, 2021	Sport Hall Coliseum	Grozny, Russia
6	ACA YE 21: Midaev vs. Djakhbarov	October 11, 2021	Tolstoy-Yurt Arena	Tolstoy-Yurt, Russia
7	ACA YE 22: Satuev vs. Amanbaev	November 12, 2021	Tolstoy-Yurt Arena	Tolstoy-Yurt, Russia
8	ACA YE 23: Grand Prix Final	December 25, 2021	Sport Hall Coliseum	Grozny, Russia

== ACA YE 16: Grand Prix ==
ACA YE 16: Grand Prix
- Promotion: Absolute Championship Akhmat
- Date: January 30, 2021
- Venue: Tolstoy-Yurt Arena
- City: Tolstoy-Yurt, Russia

Absolute Championship Akhmat Young Eagles 16: Grand Prix was a mixed martial arts event held by Absolute Championship Akhmat on January 30, 2021 at the Tolstoy-Yurt Arena in Tolstoy-Yurt, Russia.

=== Background ===
Bonus awards:

The following fighters were awarded bonuses:

- Fight of the Night: Chermen Gobaev vs. Anzor Elgaraev
- Knockout of the Night: Umalat Israpilov
- Submission of the Night: Islam Konchiev

=== Results ===
ACA YE 16
Weight Class				Method	Round	Time	Notes
Lightweight 70 kg	(Russia) Yusup Umarov	def.	(Russia) Zalimkhan Yusupov	Decision (Unanimous)	3	5:00	
Featherweight 66 kg	(Russia) Yusup-Khadji Zubariev	def.	(Russia) Makhamadjon Kurbanov	TKO (Knee to the body and punches)	1	4:56	
Bantamweight 61 kg	(Russia) Chermen Gobaev	def.	(Russia) Anzor Elgaraev	Decision (Unanimous)	3	5:00	Bantamweight Grand Prix 1/8 Final
Bantamweight 61 kg	(Russia) Turpal-Ali Edilov	def.	(Kyrgyzstan) Oybek Djuraev	Decision (Unanimous)	3	5:00	Bantamweight Grand Prix 1/8 Final
Bantamweight 61 kg	(Turkmenistan) Khurshed Nazarov	def.	(Russia) Zelimkham Yashurkaev	TKO (Doctor Stoppage)	1	5:00	Bantamweight Grand Prix 1/8 Final
Bantamweight 61 kg	(Kyrgyzstan) Adilet Ashymov	def.	(Russia) Magomed Vakhaev	Submission (Rear-Naked Choke)	2	2:14	Bantamweight Grand Prix 1/8 Final
Bantamweight 61 kg	(Kazakhstan) Rauan Bekbolot	def.	(Russia) Magomed Musikhanov	TKO (Punches)	3	3:33	Bantamweight Grand Prix 1/8 Final
Bantamweight 61 kg	(Russia) Minkail Khusenov	def.	(Russia) Jamal Kunizhev	Submission (Triangle Choke)	1	2:57	Bantamweight Grand Prix 1/8 Final
Bantamweight 61 kg	(Russia) Asvad Akhmatov	def.	(Russia) Khanpasha Kazanatov	Decision (Unanimous)	3	5:00	Bantamweight Grand Prix 1/8 Final
Bantamweight 61 kg	(Russia) Vladislav Davlatov	def.	(Russia) Movsar Dolsaev	Decision (Unanimous)	3	5:00	Bantamweight Grand Prix 1/8 Final
Bantamweight 61 kg	(Kyrgyzstan) Argen Chyrakbaev	def.	(Russia) Imran Edilgiriev	Submission (Armbar)	1	4:13	Bantamweight Grand Prix Reserve Fight
Flyweight 57 kg	(Russia) Salavdi Djamaldaev	def.	(Russia) David Kisiev	TKO (Corner Stoppage)	2	5:00	Flyweight Grand Prix 1/8 Final
Flyweight 57 kg	(Russia) Eldar Munapov	def.	(Russia) Ramzan Dzaurov	Decision (Unanimous)	3	5:00	Flyweight Grand Prix 1/8 Final
Flyweight 57 kg	(Russia) Islam Konchiev	def.	(Russia) Islam Chagarov	Submission (Arm-Triangle Choke)	2	3:18	Flyweight Grand Prix 1/8 Final
Flyweight 57 kg	(Russia) Movsar Galaev	def.	(Russia) Akraman Shakhidov	Decision (Unanimous)	3	5:00	Flyweight Grand Prix 1/8 Final
Flyweight 57 kg	(Russia) Rustam Debishev	def.	(Russia) Albek Khezhev	TKO (Punches)	2	4:50	Flyweight Grand Prix 1/8 Final
Flyweight 57 kg	(Russia) Umalat Israpilov	def.	(Tajikistan) Oyatullo Muminov	KO (Head Kick and Punches)	3	0:15	Flyweight Grand Prix 1/8 Final
Flyweight 57 kg	(Russia) Movladi Kalamov	def.	(Russia) Khofizchon Kurbonov	Decision (Split)	3	5:00	Flyweight Grand Prix 1/8 Final
Flyweight 57 kg	(Russia) Bashlam Amadov	def.	(Russia) Magomedzakir Amirchupanov	Decision (Unanimous)	3	5:00	Flyweight Grand Prix 1/8 Final
Flyweight 57 kg	(Russia) Ivan Parshikov	def.	(Russia) Charmo Pashaev	Decision (Split)	3	5:00	Flyweight Grand Prix Reserve Fight
Preliminary Card
Featherweight 66 kg	(Russia) Salamu Dadagov	def.	(Russia) Rashid Guseynov	Submission (Rear-Naked Choke)	1	1:42	
Bantamweight 61 kg	(Russia) Zelimkham Salatov	def.	(Uzbekistan) Ramziddin Omonov	Submission (Rear-Naked Choke)	1	1:56	
Welterweight 77 kg	(Russia) Baysangur Susurkaev	def.	(Kyrgyzstan) Akmatbek Paizilabek	KO (Knee and Punches)	1	4:58	
Heavyweight 120 kg	(Russia) Zumso Zuraev	def.	(Russia) Ruslan Myrtaev	TKO (Punches)	2	4:00	
Featherweight 66 kg	(Russia) Ramazan Ramazanov	def.	(Russia) Arbi Kakhriev	TKO (Punches)	1	0:45	
Flyweight 57 kg	(Russia) Khamzat Zakaraev	def.	(Russia) Keram Kozbaev	KO (Head kick and Punches)	1	0:47	

== ACA 117: Bagov vs. Silvério ==
ACA 117: Bagov vs. Silvério
- Promotion: Absolute Championship Akhmat
- Date: February 12, 2021
- Venue: WOW Arena
- City: Krasnaya Polyana, Russia

Absolute Championship Akhmat 117: Bagov vs. Silvério was a mixed martial arts event held by Absolute Championship Akhmat on February 12, 2021, in at the WOW Arena in Krasnaya Polyana, Russia.

=== Background ===
Former ACA Lightweight champion Ali Bagov will have his third welterweight fight against Elias Silvério.

A welterweight bout between the former ACA Lightweight title challenger Khusein Khaliev and the former M-1 Global Lightweight Champion Alexander Butenko will serve as event co-headliner. They were supposed to fight at ACA 116 in December 2020 but Butenko had withdrawn due to an injury.

Bonus awards:

The following fighters were awarded $10,000 bonuses:

- Fight of the Night: Ramazan Kishev vs. Askhab Zulaev
- Knockout of the Night: Dzhihad Yunusov
- Submission of the Night: Rene Pessoa
- $5000 Stoppage Victory Bonuses: Zamir Aripshev, Batraz Agnaev, Ayndi Umakhanov, Imran Bukuev, Daud Shaikhaev, Alikhan Vakhaev

=== Results ===
ACA 117
Weight Class				Method	Round	Time	Notes
Welterweight 77 kg	(Russia) Ali Bagov	def.	(Brazil) Elias Silvério	Decision (Unanimous)	3	5:00	
Welterweight 77 kg	(Russia) Khusein Khaliev	def.	(Brazil) Elder Amorim	Decision (Unanimous)	3	5:00	
Featherweight 66 kg	(Russia) Ramazan Kishev	def.	(Russia) Askhab Zulaev	Decision (Unanimous)	3	5:00	
Middleweight 84 kg	(Russia) Vitaly Nemchinov	def.	(Russia) Alexey Efremov	Decision (Unanimous)	3	5:00	
Light Heavyweight 93 kg	(Russia) Grigor Matevosyan	def.	(Russia) Artur Astakhov	Decision (Unanimous)	3	5:00	
Preliminary Card
Heavyweight 120 kg	(Russia) Alikhan Vakhaev	def.	(Brazil) Roggers Souza	TKO (Punches and Elbows)	1	2:14	
Featherweight 66 kg	(Russia) Dzhihad Yunusov	def.	(Brazil) Leonardo Limberger	KO (Spinning Back Elbow)	1	1:52	
Bantamweight 61 kg	(Russia) Islam Meshev	def.	(Brazil) Rodrigo Praia	Decision (Unanimous)	3	5:00	
Lightweight 70 kg	(Russia) Daud Shaikhaev	def.	(Russia) Bayzet Khatkhokhu	TKO (Punches)	2	3:33	
Flyweight 57 kg	(Russia) Imran Bukuev	def.	(Ukraine) Artem Kyrychenko	Submission (Rear-Naked Choke)	1	4:26	
Lightweight 70 kg	(Russia) Ayndi Umakhanov	def.	(Kyrgyzstan) Zharabek Teshebaev	TKO (Punches)	2	0:44	
Light Heavyweight 93 kg	(Russia) Batraz Agnaev	def.	(Russia) Alexey Sidorenko	KO (Punches)	1	0:26	
Middleweight 84 kg	(Brazil) Rene Pessoa	def.	(Russia) Baysangur Vakhitov	Submission (Rear-Naked Choke)	2	3:14	
Middleweight 84 kg	(Russia) Khusein Kushagov	def.	(Russia) Mikhail Dolgov	Decision (Unanimous)	3	5:00	
Bantamweight 61 kg	(Russia) Zamir Aripshev	def.	(Brazil) Antonio Roberto	TKO (Punches)	2	4:35	

== ACA YE 17: Grand Prix ==
ACA YE 17: Grand Prix
- Promotion: Absolute Championship Akhmat
- Date: February 20, 2021
- Venue: Tolstoy-Yurt Arena
- City: Tolstoy-Yurt, Russia

Absolute Championship Akhmat Young Eagles 17: Grand Prix was a mixed martial arts event held by Absolute Championship Akhmat on February 20, 2021, at the Tolstoy-Yurt Arena in Tolstoy-Yurt, Russia.

=== Background ===
Bonus awards:

The following fighters were awarded bonuses:

- Submission of the Night: Ramazan Yuzyasharov

=== Results ===
ACA YE 17
Weight Class				Method	Round	Time	Notes
Bantamweight 61 kg	(Russia) Salamu Zakarov	def.	(Russia) Rasul Malsugenov	Decision (Split)	3	5:00	
Bantamweight 61 kg	(Russia) Islam Yunusov	def.	(Kyrgyzstan) Zarlyk Zalkarbek	Decision (Unanimous)	3	5:00	
Bantamweight 61 kg	(Russia) Jaddal Alibekov	def.	(Kyrgyzstan) Elaman Childebay	TKO (Punches to the Body)	2	0:18	
Flyweight 57 kg	(Kyrgyzstan) Shabdan Sarykov	def.	(Russia) Khasan Bisultanov	Decision (Unanimous)	3	5:00	
Lightweight 70 kg	(Russia) Ramazan Yuzyasharov	def.	(Russia) Abdulkappar Kapparov	Submission (Guillotine Choke)	2	4:28	Lightweight Grand Prix 1/8 Final
Lightweight 70 kg	(Russia) Ali Khadashev	def.	(Kyrgyzstan) Daler Abdumomunov	TKO (Retirement)	1	5:00	Lightweight Grand Prix 1/8 Final
Lightweight 70 kg	(Russia) Murat Bogatyrev	def.	(Russia) Adam Gudaev	Decision (Unanimous)	3	5:00	Lightweight Grand Prix 1/8 Final
Lightweight 70 kg	(Russia) Abubakar Temirgereev	def.	(Russia) German Kokaev	Decision (Split)	3	5:00	Lightweight Grand Prix 1/8 Final
Lightweight 70 kg	(Russia) Tamerlan Ashakhanov	def.	(Russia) Soslan Gerekov	Decision (Unanimous)	3	5:00	Lightweight Grand Prix 1/8 Final
Lightweight 70 kg	(Russia) Muslim Ibragimov	def.	(Russia) Salavdi Abdurakhmanov	TKO (Punches)	2	4:26	Lightweight Grand Prix 1/8 Final
Lightweight 70 kg	(Russia) Ivan Podrugin	def.	(Russia) Ali Suleymanov	Submission (Rear-Naked Choke)	2	4:24	Lightweight Grand Prix 1/8 Final
Lightweight 70 kg	(Russia) Alimkhan Djamulaev	def.	(Russia) Chermen Melikov	Submission (Rear-Naked Choke)	2	2:25	Lightweight Grand Prix 1/8 Final
Featherweight 66 kg	(Kyrgyzstan) Adilet Nurmatov	def.	(Russia) Shadid Abdurzakov	Decision (Unanimous)	3	5:00	Featherweight Grand Prix 1/8 Final
Featherweight 66 kg	(Russia) Stanislav Nanaev	def.	(Kyrgyzstan) Semetey Bakhtiyar	Submission (Rear-Naked Choke)	1	4:37	Featherweight Grand Prix 1/8 Final
Featherweight 66 kg	(Russia) Georgiy Tsukgkiev	def.	(Russia) Alikhan Obkuev	Submission (Rear-Naked Choke)	2	0:44	Featherweight Grand Prix 1/8 Final
Featherweight 66 kg	(Russia) Viskhan Kadirov	def.	(Russia) Abdurazak Mansurov	Submission (Rear-Naked Choke)	2	1:32	Featherweight Grand Prix 1/8 Final
Featherweight 66 kg	(Russia) Sulim Asukhanov	def.	(Uzbekistan) Farkhod Kuliev	Submission (Arm-Triangle Choke)	1	1:05	Featherweight Grand Prix 1/8 Final
Featherweight 66 kg	(Russia) Artem Nuzhnov	def.	(Russia) Ibragim Askhabov	Decision (Split)	3	5:00	Featherweight Grand Prix 1/8 Final
Featherweight 66 kg	(Russia) Djambulat Selimkhanov	def.	(Russia) Alexandr Stovburenko	TKO (Punches)	1	2:22	Featherweight Grand Prix 1/8 Final
Featherweight 66 kg	(Russia) Khasan Dadalov	def.	(Kyrgyzstan) Dastan Zaiyrbek	TKO (Punches)	2	1:05	Featherweight Grand Prix 1/8 Final
Featherweight 66 kg	(Tajikistan) Dorobshokh Nabotov	def.	(Russia) Islam Abuev	Decision (Split)	3	5:00	Featherweight Grand Prix Reserve Fight
Preliminary Card
Lightweight 70 kg	(Russia) Adam Masaev	def.	(Kyrgyzstan) Janybek Jansariev	Submission (Straight Ankle Lock)	1	0:21	
Lightweight 70 kg	(Russia) Shamil Tsakuev	def.	(Tajikistan) Kamardin Akhmadbekov	Submission (Triangle Choke)	1	2:30	
Flyweight 57 kg	(Russia) Akhmed Yasaev	def.	(Russia) Timur Aliev	Submission (North–South Choke)	2	2:47	
Light Heavyweight 93 kg	(Russia) Sulim Batalov	def.	(Russia) Artur Sirajudinov	TKO (Knees)	2	2:51	
Featherweight 66 kg	(Russia) Gayabek Ibragimov	def.	(Kyrgyzstan) Zamir Kalmurzaev	TKO (Knee to the Body and Punches)	1	4:43	

== ACA 118: Abdulaev vs. Vagaev 2 ==
ACA 118: Abdulaev vs. Vagaev 2
- Promotion: Absolute Championship Akhmat
- Date: February 26, 2021
- Venue: Basket Hall Moscow
- City: Moscow, Russia

Absolute Championship Akhmat 118: Abdulaev vs. Vagaev 2 was a mixed martial arts event held by Absolute Championship Akhmat on February 26, 2021, at the Basket Hall Moscow in Moscow, Russia.

=== Background ===
The event was headlined by a title fight for the ACA welterweight title between 2 formers WFCA welterweight champion and current ACA champ Murad Abdulaev and Abubakar Vagaev. Abdulaev have previously beaten Vagaev by knockout at WFCA 53 to win the WFCA welterweight Title.

A rematch between former FNG Welterweight Champion Georgy Kichigin and Gadzhimurad Khiramagomedov served as the co-main event of the evening. The pairing previously met at Fight Nights Global 65, where Kichigin defeated Khiramagomedov by split decision to capture the FNG inaugural title.

Rasul Mirzaev was scheduled to fight Nurbergen Sharipov in a featherweight bout, but the fight was canceled when Sharipov missed weight by 4.5 Kilograms.

Bonus awards:

The following fighters were awarded $10,000 bonuses:

- Fight of the Night: Abdul-Rakhman Dudaev vs. Pavel Vitruk
- Knockout of the Night: Azamat Pshukov
- Submission of the Night: Alexander Sarnavskiy
- $5000 Stoppage Victory Bonuses: Bekhruz Zukhurov

=== Results ===
ACA 118
Weight Class				Method	Round	Time	Notes
Welterweight 77 kg	(Russia) Abubakar Vagaev	def.	(Russia) Murad Abdulaev (c)	Decision (Unanimous)	5	5:00	For the ACA Welterweight Championship
Welterweight 77 kg	(Russia) Gadzhimurad Khiramagomedov	def.	(Kazakhstan) Georgy Kichigin	Decision (Unanimous)	3	5:00	
Lightweight 70 kg	(Russia) Alexander Sarnavskiy	def.	(Belarus) Artem Damkovskiy	Submission (Rear-Naked Choke)	1	4:55	
Bantamweight 61 kg	(Russia) Abdul-Rakhman Dudaev	def.	(Ukraine) Pavel Vitruk	Decision (Split)	3	5:00	
Welterweight 77 kg	(Russia) Ustarmagomed Gadzhidaudov	def.	(Russia) Andrei Koshkin	Decision (Unanimous)	3	5:00	
Preliminary Card
Middleweight 84 kg	(Russia) Beslan Ushukov	def.	(Ukraine) Vadim Shabadash	Decision (Unanimous)	3	5:00	
Flyweight 57 kg	(Brazil) Charles Henrique	def.	(Tajikistan) Azam Gaforov	Decision (Majority)	3	5:00	
Middleweight 84 kg	(Russia) Abdul-Rahman Dzhanaev	def.	(Brazil) Cleber Souza	Decision (Unanimous)	3	5:00	
Bantamweight 61 kg	(Russia) Mansur Khatuev	def.	(Russia) Mikhail Pogodin	Decision (Unanimous)	3	5:00	
Flyweight 57 kg	(Russia) Azamat Pshukov	def.	(Brazil) Josiel Silva	KO (Punches)	1	1:09	
Lightweight 70 kg	(Russia) Abubakar Mestoev	def.	(Ukraine) Samvel Vardanyan	Decision (Unanimous)	3	5:00	
Featherweight 66 kg	(Tajikistan) Bekhruz Zukhurov	def.	(Russia) Roman Podrugin	TKO (Punches)	2	2:38	

== ACA 119: Frolov vs. da Silva ==
ACA 119: Frolov vs. da Silva
- Promotion: Absolute Championship Akhmat
- Date: March 12, 2021
- Venue: Basket-Hall
- City: Krasnodar, Russia

Absolute Championship Akhmat 119: Frolov vs. da Silva was a mixed martial arts event held by Absolute Championship Akhmat on March 12, 2021, at the Basket-Hall in Krasnodar, Russia.

=== Background ===
The event was headlined by a middleweight bout between the former M-1 Global Middleweight Champion Artem Frolov and Wendres da Silva.

The card also featured a welterweight bout between Eldar Khashpakov and #10 ranked Mark Hulme.

Bonus awards:

The following fighters were awarded $10,000 bonuses:

- Fight of the Night: Eldar Khashpakov vs. Mark Hulme
- Knockout of the Night: Artem Frolov
- Submission of the Night: Walter Pereira Jr.
- $5000 Stoppage Victory Bonuses: Adlan Ibragimov, Makhochi Sagitov

=== Results ===
ACA 119
Weight Class				Method	Round	Time	Notes
Middleweight 84 kg	(Russia) Artem Frolov	def.	(Brazil) Wendres da Silva	KO (Punches)	3	1:50	
Lightweight 70 kg	(Russia) Anatoliy Boyko	def.	(Russia) Murat Tlyarukov	Decision (Unanimous)	3	5:00	
Welterweight 77 kg	(Russia) Eldar Khashpakov	def.	(South Africa) Mark Hulme	Decision (Unanimous)	3	5:00	
Middleweight 84 kg	(Russia) Ibragim Magomedov	def.	(Brazil) Irwing Machado	Decision (Unanimous)	3	5:00	
Preliminary Card
Featherweight 66 kg	(Russia) Makhochi Sagitov	def.	(Brazil) Nilton Gavião	TKO (Punches)	1	3:01	
Featherweight 66 kg	(Armenia) Arkadiy Osipyan	def.	(Russia) Alberd Zhapuev	Submission (Anaconda Choke)	1	2:50	
Light Heavyweight 93 kg	(Russia) Adlan Ibragimov	def.	(Russia) Vladimir Fedin	Submission (Arm-Triangle Choke)	1	2:31	
Bantamweight 61 kg	(Brazil) Walter Pereira Jr.	def.	(Russia) Nikolay Baikin	Submission (Arm-Triangle Choke)	2	4:45	

== ACA 120: Oliveira vs. Bibulatov ==
ACA 120: Oliveira vs. Bibulatov
- Promotion: Absolute Championship Akhmat
- Date: March 26, 2021
- Venue: Sibur Arena
- City: Saint Petersburg, Russia

Absolute Championship Akhmat 120: Oliveira vs. Bibulatov was a mixed martial arts event held by Absolute Championship Akhmat on March 26, 2021, at the Sibur Arena in Saint Petersburg, Russia.

=== Background ===
The event featured a title fight, the reigning ACA Bantamweight champion Daniel Oliveira fought Magomed Bibulatov in the headliner.

A title bout between former champion Felipe Froes and Magomedrasul Khasbulaev served as the ACA 120 co-main event, the bout was for the vacant ACA Featherweight title. The pairing were supposed to have met previously on November 6, 2020, at ACA 113, but Khasbulaev was unable to compete due to a leg injury. Froes missed weight and therefore was not eligible to win the title if he wins the fight.

Bonus awards:

The following fighters were awarded $10,000 bonuses:

- Fight of the Night: Apti Bimarzaev vs. Tural Ragimov
- Fight of the Night: Islam Omarov vs. Bibert Tumenov
- Submission of the Night: Amirkhan Guliev
- $5000 Stoppage Victory Bonuses: Salimgerey Rasulov, Magomedrasul Khasbulaev

=== Results ===
ACA 120
Weight Class				Method	Round	Time	Notes
Bantamweight 61 kg	(Russia) Magomed Bibulatov	def.	(Brazil) Daniel Oliveira (c)	Decision (Unanimous)	5	5:00	For the ACA Bantamweight Championship
Featherweight 66 kg	(Russia) Magomedrasul Khasbulaev	def.	(Brazil) Felipe Froes	Submission (Rear-Naked Choke)	4	1:02	For the vacant ACA Featherweight Championship
Featherweight 66 kg	(Russia) Salman Zhamaldaev	def.	(Brazil) Diego Brandão	DQ (Illegal Kick)	2	1:05	
Heavyweight 120 kg	(Russia) Salimgerey Rasulov	def.	(Estonia) Denis Smoldarev	TKO (Punches)	2	2:32	
Lightweight 70 kg	(Russia) Rashid Magomedov	def.	(Russia) Mukhamed Kokov	Decision (Split)	3	5:00	
Preliminary Card
Featherweight 66 kg	(Belarus) Apti Bimarzaev	def.	(Azerbaijan) Tural Ragimov	Decision (Unanimous)	3	5:00	
Featherweight 66 kg	(Russia) Islam Omarov	def.	(Russia) Bibert Tumenov	Decision (Unanimous)	3	5:00	
Light Heavyweight 93 kg	(Russia) Muslim Magomedov	def.	(Brazil) Leonardo Silva	Decision (Unanimous)	3	5:00	
Light Heavyweight 93 kg	(Russia) Ivan Shtyrkov	def.	(Russia) Murat Gugov	Decision (Split)	3	5:00	
Light Heavyweight 93 kg	(Russia) Amirkhan Guliev	def.	(Russia) Dmitriy Krivulets	Submission (Ankle Lock)	1	1:48	
Lightweight 70 kg	(Russia) Lom-Ali Nalgiev	def.	(Brazil) Denis Silva	Decision (Unanimous)	3	5:00	

== ACA 121: Dipchikov vs. Gasanov ==
ACA 121: Dipchikov vs. Gasanov
- Promotion: Absolute Championship Akhmat
- Date: April 9, 2021
- Venue: Falcon Arena
- City: Minsk, Belarus

Absolute Championship Akhmat 121: Dipchikov vs. Gasanov was a mixed martial arts event held by Absolute Championship Akhmat on April 9, 2021, at the Falcon Arena in Minsk, Belarus.

=== Background ===
ACA 121 was the first of two consecutive events held in Minsk, Belarus. In the main event, the undefeated ACA Flyweight champion Azamat Kerefov made his second title defense against the #3 ranked Rasul Albaskhanov. However, 2 days before Kerefov had to withdraw from the bout due to health issues.

Nikola Dipchikov will fight Magomedrasul Gasanov for the interim ACA Middleweight title.

Bonus awards:

The following fighters were awarded $10,000 bonuses:

- Fight of the Night: Oleg Borisov vs. Shamil Shakhbulatov
- Submission of the Night: Alikhan Suleimanov

=== Results ===
ACA 121
Weight Class				Method	Round	Time	Notes
Middleweight 84 kg	(Russia) Magomedrasul Gasanov	def.	(Bulgaria) Nikola Dipchikov	TKO (Punches)	2	1:33	For the interim ACA Middleweight Championship
Bantamweight 61 kg	(Russia) Oleg Borisov	def.	(Russia) Shamil Shakhbulatov	Decision (Split)	3	5:00	
Lightweight 70 kg	(Brazil) Hacran Dias	def.	(Russia) Amirkhan Adaev	Decision (Unanimous)	3	5:00	
Featherweight 66 kg	(Russia) Alikhan Suleimanov	def.	(Russia) Kurban Taygibov	Submission (Rear-Naked Choke)	1	1:55	
Preliminary Card
Welterweight 77 kg	(Russia) Chersi Dudaev	def.	(Kazakhstan) Igor Svirid	Decision (Unanimous)	3	5:00	
Lightweight 70 kg	(Belarus) Ilya Khodkevich	def.	(Bulgaria) Plamen Bachvarov	Decision (Unanimous)	3	5:00	
Lightweight 70 kg	(Brazil) Herdeson Batista	def.	(Poland) Łukasz Kopera	TKO (Doctor Stoppage)	2	5:00	
Bantamweight 61 kg	(Russia) Khasein Shaikhaev	def.	(Brazil) Cleverson Silva	Decision (Unanimous)	3	5:00	
Flyweight 57 kg	(Belarus) Andrey Kalechits	def.	(Belarus) Anton Larkov	Decision (Unanimous)	3	5:00	
Flyweight 57 kg	(Brazil) Maycon Silvan	def.	(Tajikistan) Osimkhon Rakhmonov	Submission (Guillotine Choke)	1	4:48	
Featherweight 66 kg	(Russia) Mehdi Baydulaev	def.	(Russia) Ilya Volynets	Submission (Rear-Naked Choke)	2	2:00	
Featherweight 66 kg	(Georgia (country)) Vazha Tsiptauri	def.	(Kyrgyzstan) Kanat Keldibekov	Decision (Unanimous)	3	5:00	

== ACA YE 18: Grand Prix 1/4 Finals ==
ACA YE 18: Grand Prix 1/4 Finals
- Promotion: Absolute Championship Akhmat
- Date: April 12, 2021
- Venue: Tolstoy-Yurt Arena
- City: Tolstoy-Yurt, Russia

Absolute Championship Akhmat Young Eagles 18: Grand Prix 1/4 Finalswas a mixed martial arts event held by Absolute Championship Akhmat on April 12, 2021, at the Tolstoy-Yurt Arena in Tolstoy-Yurt, Russia.

=== Background ===
Bonus awards:

The following fighters were awarded bonuses:

- Fight of the Night: Basir Saraliev vs. Adilet Nurmatov
- Knockout of the Night: Alimkhan Djamulaev
- Submission of the Night: Ibrakhim Askhabov

=== Results ===
ACA YE 18
Weight Class				Method	Round	Time	Notes
Bantamweight 61 kg	(Russia) Isa Kilaev	def.	(Kyrgyzstan) Ruslan Tashtankul	TKO (Punches)	2	4:05	
Lightweight 70 kg	(Russia) Saykhan Djabrailov	-	(Kyrgyzstan) Rustambek Amanbaev	No Contest	3	0:00	
Bantamweight 61 kg	(Russia) Akhmed Saraliev	def.	(Tajikistan) Sino Sabzaliev	KO (Punches)	1	3:52	
Lightweight 70 kg	(Russia) Alan Zangiev	def.	(Russia) Iliskhan Azhigov	TKO (Injury)	2	5:00	
Flyweight 57 kg	(Russia) Akhmed Khamzaev	def.	(Kyrgyzstan) Ariet Kubanychbek	KO (Punches)	1	2:04	
Lightweight 70 kg	(Russia) Ramazan Yuzyasharov	def.	(Russia) Ali Khadashev	Decision (Unanimous)	3	5:00	Lightweight Grand Prix Quarter-Finals
Lightweight 70 kg	(Russia) German Kokaev	def.	(Russia) Abubakar Temirgereev	TKO (Punches)	1	0:31	Lightweight Grand Prix Quarter-Finals
Lightweight 70 kg	(Russia) Muslim Ibragimov	def.	(Russia) Tamerlan Ashakhanov	Decision (Unanimous)	3	5:00	Lightweight Grand Prix Quarter-Finals
Lightweight 70 kg	(Russia) Alimkhan Djamulaev	def.	(Russia) Vadim Djigkaev	KO (Knee and Punches)	2	0:27	Lightweight Grand Prix Quarter-Finals
Featherweight 66 kg	(Russia) Basir Saraliev	def.	(Kyrgyzstan) Adilet Nurmatov	Decision (Unanimous)	3	5:00	Featherweight Grand Prix Quarter-Finals
Featherweight 66 kg	(Russia) Ibrakhim Askhabov	def.	(Russia) Georgiy Tsugkiev	Submission (Triangle Choke)	3	3:09	Featherweight Grand Prix Quarter-Finals
Featherweight 66 kg	(Russia) Djhambulat Selimkhanov	def.	(Russia) Khasan Dadalov	Decision (Unanimous)	3	5:00	Featherweight Grand Prix Quarter-Finals
Bantamweight 61 kg	(Russia) Asvad Akhmatov	def.	(Kyrgyzstan) Argen Chyrykbaev	Decision (Unanimous)	3	5:00	Bantamweight Grand Prix Quarter-Finals
Bantamweight 61 kg	(Russia) Minkail Khusenov	def.	(Kazakhstan) Rauan Bekbolat	Decision (Unanimous)	3	5:00	Bantamweight Grand Prix Quarter-Finals
Bantamweight 61 kg	(Tajikistan) Khurshed Nazarov	def.	(Kyrgyzstan) Adilet Ashimov	Decision (Unanimous)	3	5:00	Bantamweight Grand Prix Quarter-Finals
Bantamweight 61 kg	(Russia) Chermen Gobaev	def.	(Russia) Turpal Ali Edilov	Decision (Unanimous)	3	5:00	Bantamweight Grand Prix Quarter-Finals
Flyweight 57 kg	(Russia) Salavdi Dzhamaldaev	def.	(Russia) Eldar Munapov	Decision (Unanimous)	3	5:00	Flyweight Grand Prix Quarter-Finals
Flyweight 57 kg	(Russia) Umalat Israpilov	def.	(Russia) Ivan Parshikov	Decision (Unanimous)	3	5:00	Flyweight Grand Prix Quarter-Finals
Flyweight 57 kg	(Russia) Islam Konchiev	def.	(Russia) Movsar Galaev	Decision (Unanimous)	3	5:00	Flyweight Grand Prix Quarter-Finals
Preliminary Card
Flyweight 57 kg	(Kyrgyzstan) Kylymbek Altymysh	def.	(Russia) Khas-Magomed Demelkhanov	Submission (Rear-Naked Choke)	3	2:15	
Bantamweight 61 kg	(Russia) Albert Misikov	def.	(Russia) Said-Khusein Akhyadov	Decision (Unanimous)	3	5:00	
Bantamweight 61 kg	(Russia) Arsen Edzaev	-	(Russia) Said-Magomed Masiev	Draw	2	5:00	Exhibition
Featherweight 66 kg	(Tajikistan) Firuz Nazaraliev	def.	(Russia) Goysum Choltaev	Decision (Unanimous)	3	5:00	
Bantamweight 61 kg	(Russia) Magomed Bayduev	def.	(Russia) Karim Getaev	Decision (Unanimous)	3	5:00	
Middleweight 84 kg	(Russia) Magomed Bekmurzaev	def.	(Russia) Azamat Sumenov	Decision (Unanimous)	3	5:00	
Welterweight 77 kg	(Russia) Adlan Kushagov	def.	(Russia) Bogdan Mozgovoy	Decision (Unanimous)	3	5:00	

== ACA 122: Johnson vs. Poberezhets ==
ACA 122: Johnson vs. Poberezhets
- Promotion: Absolute Championship Akhmat
- Date: April 23, 2021
- Venue: Falcon Arena
- City: Minsk, Belarus

Absolute Championship Akhmat 122: Johnson vs. Poberezhets was a mixed martial arts event held by Absolute Championship Akhmat on April 23, 2021, at the Falcon Arena in Minsk, Belarus.

=== Background ===
Tony Johnson's defense of his heavyweight title against the #2 ranked Dmitry Poberezhets served as the event headliner.

Bonus awards:

The following fighters were awarded $10,000 bonuses:

- Knockout of the Night: Artem Damkovsky
- Submission of the Night: Aurel Pîrtea

=== Results ===
ACA 122
Weight Class				Method	Round	Time	Notes
Heavyweight 120 kg	(United States) Tony Johnson (c)	def.	(Ukraine) Dmitry Poberezhets	TKO (Punches)	3	4:04	For the ACA Heavyweight Championship
Lightweight 70 kg	(Belarus) Artem Damkovsky	def.	(Czech Republic) Vitezslav Rajnoch	KO (Punches)	2	1:21	
Lightweight 70 kg	(Romania) Aurel Pîrtea	def.	(Georgia (country)) Raul Tutarauli	Submission (Guillotine Choke)	2	3:38	
Heavyweight 120 kg	(Poland) Daniel Omielańczuk	def.	(United States) Daniel James	Decision (Unanimous)	3	5:00	
Middleweight 84 kg	(Poland) Rafał Haratyk	def.	(Poland) Piotr Strus	Decision (Unanimous)	3	5:00	
Preliminary Card
Middleweight 84 kg	(Belarus) Vladislav Yankovsky	def.	(Iran) Maziar Elhamivarmezani	Decision (Unanimous)	3	5:00	
Heavyweight 120 kg	(Czech Republic) Michal Martínek	def.	(Lithuania) Tomas Pakutinskas	Decision (Split)	3	5:00	
Featherweight 66 kg	(Georgia (country)) Levan Makashvili	def.	(Brazil) Elisman Lima da Silva	Decision (Unanimous)	3	5:00	
Featherweight 66 kg	(Belarus) Alexander Kovalev	def.	(Finland) Markus Rytohonka	Submission (Anaconda Choke)	2	4:33	
Middleweight 84 kg	(Russia) Azamat Bekoev	def.	(United States) Chris Honeycutt	Submission (Rear-Naked Choke)	2	4:33	
Light Heavyweight 93 kg	(Ukraine) Dmitriy Mikutsa	def.	(Poland) Karol Celiński	TKO (Knees and Punches)	1	3:50	
Featherweight 66 kg	(Ukraine) Dmitriy Parubchenko	def.	(Bulgaria) Tihomir Blagovestov	Decision (Unanimous)	3	5:00	
Flyweight 57 kg	(Georgia (country)) Bidzina Gavashelishvili	def.	(Finland) Mikael Silander	Decision (Unanimous)	3	5:00	
Light Heavyweight 93 kg	(Croatia) Goran Reljić	def.	(Brazil) Carlos Eduardo	Decision (Split)	3	5:00	

== ACA 123: Koshkin vs. Butenko ==
ACA 123: Koshkin vs. Butenko
- Promotion: Absolute Championship Akhmat
- Date: May 28, 2021
- Venue: CSKA Arena
- City: Moscow, Russia

Absolute Championship Akhmat 123: Koshkin vs. Butenko was a mixed martial arts event held by Absolute Championship Akhmat on May 28, 2021, at the CSKA Arena in Moscow, Russia.

=== Background ===
A welterweight bout between Alexander Butenko and Andrey Koshkin was expected to serve as the event headliner.

A welterweight fight contested by Elias Silvério and Georgiy Kichigin served as co-main event.

Bonus awards:

The following fighters were awarded bonuses:

- $50,000 Performance of the Night: Rene Pessoa
- $5000 Stoppage Victory Bonuses: Josiel Silva, Leonardo Limberger, Aren Akopyan, Artur Astakhov, Andrey Koshkin

=== Results ===
ACA 123
Weight Class				Method	Round	Time	Notes
Welterweight 77 kg	(Russia) Andrey Koshkin	def.	(Ukraine) Alexander Butenko	KO (Punches)	2	3:07	
Welterweight 77 kg	(Kazakhstan) Georgiy Kichigin	def.	(Brazil) Elias Silvério	Decision (Split)	3	5:00	
Featherweight 66 kg	(Russia) Alexander Matmuratov	def.	(Russia) Alexey Polpudnikov	Decision (Split)	3	5:00	
Light Heavyweight 93 kg	(Russia) Artur Astakhov	def.	(Russia) Ilya Shcheglov	KO (Punches)	2	3:21	
Flyweight 57 kg	(Russia) Aren Akopyan	def.	(Brazil) Ruan Pereira	Submission (Guillotine Choke)	1	0:24	
Preliminary Card
Bantamweight 61 kg	(Ukraine) Pavel Vitruk	def.	(Brazil) Dileno Lopes	Decision (Unanimous)	3	5:00	
Middleweight 84 kg	(Brazil) Rene Pessoa	def.	(Russia) Alexey Efremov	KO (Punches)	3	3:55	
Bantamweight 61 kg	(Brazil) Rodrigo Praia	def.	(Russia) Igor Zhirkov	Decision (Split)	3	5:00	
Welterweight 77 kg	(Russia) Stanislav Vlasenko	def.	(Italy) Cristian Brinzan	Decision (Unanimous)	3	5:00	
Flyweight 57 kg	(Brazil) Josiel Silva	def.	(Russia) Mikhail Pogodin	Submission (Rear-Naked Choke)	1	0:43	
Featherweight 66 kg	(Brazil) Leonardo Limberger	def.	(Russia) Alexander Peduson	Submission (Rear-Naked Choke)	3	3:08	
Middleweight 84 kg	(Russia) Mikhail Dolgov	def.	(Brazil) Cleber Souza	Decision (Unanimous)	3	5:00	
Lightweight 70 kg	(Kyrgyzstan) Zharabek Teshebaev	def.	(Russia) Mikhail Balakirev	Decision (Unanimous)	3	5:00	

== ACA 124: Galiev vs. Batista ==
ACA 124: Galiev vs. Batista
- Promotion: Absolute Championship Akhmat
- Date: June 11, 2021
- Venue: TatNeft Arena
- City: Kazan, Russia

Absolute Championship Akhmat 124: Galiev vs. Batista was a mixed martial arts event held by Absolute Championship Akhmat on June 11, 2021, at the TatNeft Arena in Kazan, Russia.

=== Background ===
Bonus awards:

The following fighters were awarded bonuses:

- $50,000 Performance of the Night: Altynbek Mamashov
- $5000 Stoppage Victory Bonuses: Osimkhon Rakhmonov, Herdeson Batista

=== Results ===
ACA 124
Weight Class				Method	Round	Time	Notes
Lightweight 70 kg	(Brazil) Herdeson Batista	def.	(Russia) Vener Galiev	TKO (Punches)	3	2:29	
Bantamweight 61 kg	(Russia) Murad Kalamov	def.	(Brazil) Walter Pereira Jr.	Decision (Unanimous)	3	5:00	
Light Heavyweight 93 kg	(Russia) Amirkhan Guliev	def.	(Russia) Roman Gudochkin	Decision (Split)	3	5:00	
Flyweight 57 kg	(Brazil) Alan Gomes	def.	(Russia) Lenar Suleimanov	Decision (Unanimous)	3	5:00	
Bantamweight 61 kg	(Russia) Maharbek Karginov	def.	(Russia) Nikita Chistyakov	Decision (Unanimous)	3	5:00	
Preliminary Card
Lightweight 70 kg	(Russia) Abubakar Mestoev	def.	(Russia) Egor Golubtsov	Decision (Split)	3	5:00	
Bantamweight 61 kg	(Russia) Akhmed Musakaev	def.	(Tajikistan) Mukhitdin Kholov	Decision (Unanimous)	3	5:00	
Lightweight 70 kg	(Russia) Pavel Gordeev	def.	(Brazil) Denis Silva	Decision (Unanimous)	3	5:00	
Welterweight 77 kg	(Kyrgyzstan) Altynbek Mamashov	def.	(Russia) Vasily Kurochkin	KO (Punch)	2	2:12	
Lightweight 70 kg	(Russia) Sergey Yakovlev	def.	(Russia) Arseniy Yatsynov	Decision (Unanimous)	3	5:00	
Flyweight 57 kg	(Tajikistan) Osimkhon Rakhmonov	def.	(Russia) Aslan Shogov	Submission (Rear-Naked Choke)	2	4:39	

== ACA 125: Dudaev vs. de Lima ==
ACA 125: Dudaev vs. de Lima
- Promotion: Absolute Championship Akhmat
- Date: June 29, 2021
- Venue: Bolshoy Ice Dome
- City: Sochi, Russia

Absolute Championship Akhmat 125: Dudaev vs. de Lima was a mixed martial arts event held by Absolute Championship Akhmat on June 29, 2021, at the Bolshoy Ice Dome in Sochi, Russia.

=== Background ===
Maycon Silvan was scheduled to fight against Imran Bukuev. However, Silvan pulled out of the fight on the day before the event due to health problems, the fight was canceled.

Bayzet Khatkhokhu was scheduled to fight against Musa Khamanaev in a lightweight bout. But, Khatkhokhu badly missed weight 1.95 kg over the limit on Monday, leading to the cancellation of his fight with Khamanaev on Tuesday night at Bolshoy Ice Dome.

Bonus awards:

The following fighters were awarded bonuses:

- $50,000 Performance of the Night: Azamat Amagov
- $5000 Stoppage Victory Bonuses: Ali Bagov, Abdul-Rakhman Dudaev

=== Results ===
ACA 125
Weight Class				Method	Round	Time	Notes
Lightweight 70 kg	(Russia) Abdul-Rakhman Dudaev	def.	(Brazil) Francisco de Lima	TKO (Punches)	1	3:24	
Welterweight 77 kg	(Russia) Ali Bagov	def.	(Kyrgyzstan) Tilek Mashrapov	Submission (Kimura)	3	3:33	
Light Heavyweight 93 kg	(Russia) Oleg Olenyechev	def.	(Brazil) Carlos Eduardo	Decision (Split)	3	5:00	
Featherweight 66 kg	(Russia) Alexander Matmuratov	def.	(Brazil) Elisman Lima	Decision (Unanimous)	3	5:00	
Featherweight 66 kg	(Armenia) Sevak Arekalyan	def.	(Ukraine) Ilya Volynets	Submission (Rear-Naked Choke)	1	4:12	
Preliminary Card
Welterweight 77 kg	(Russia) Azamat Amagov	def.	(Brazil) Wilker Lemos	KO (Punches)	1	1:50	
Welterweight 77 kg	(Brazil) Irving Romero-Machado	def.	(Russia) Magomedsaygid Alibekov	Decision (Unanimous)	3	5:00	
Welterweight 77 kg	(Russia) Vladislav Chernobrivtsev	def.	(Russia) Vladimir Shmelev	Submission (Triangle Choke)	2	1:27	

== ACA 126: Magomedov vs. Egemberdiev ==
ACA 126: Magomedov vs. Egemberdiev
- Promotion: Absolute Championship Akhmat
- Date: July 16, 2021
- Venue: Bolshoy Ice Dome
- City: Sochi, Russia

Absolute Championship Akhmat 126: Magomedov vs. Egemberdiev was a mixed martial arts event held by Absolute Championship Akhmat on July 16, 2021, at the Bolshoy Ice Dome in Sochi, Russia.

=== Background ===
The event was headlined by a vacant ACA Light Heavyweight title fight between Muslim Magomedov and Evgeniy Egemberdiev.

The co-main event featured a lightweight bout between Marat Balaev and Joao Luiz Nogueira.

Bonus awards:

The following fighters were awarded bonuses:

- $50,000 Performance of the Night: Husein Kushagov
- $5000 Stoppage Victory Bonuses: Mehdi Baidulaev, Cleverson Silva, Dzhihad Yunusov, Muslim Magomedov

=== Results ===
ACA 126
Weight Class				Method	Round	Time	Notes
Light Heavyweight 93 kg	(Russia) Muslim Magomedov	def.	(Kazakhstan) Evgeniy Egemberdiev	KO (Punches)	3	3:49	For the vacant ACA Light Heavyweight Championship
Lightweight 70 kg	(Russia) Marat Balaev	def.	(Brazil) João Luis Nogueira	Decision (Unanimous)	3	5:00	
Featherweight 66 kg	(Russia) Dzhihad Yunusov	def.	(Kyrgyzstan) Bayaman Nurmamat	KO (Spinning Elbow)	1	3:21	
Heavyweight 120 kg	(Estonia) Denis Smoldarev	def.	(Russia) Ruslan Magomedov	Decision (Split)	3	5:00	
Featherweight 66 kg	(Brazil) Cleverson Silva	def.	(Russia) Nashkho Galaev	Submission (Rear-Naked Choke)	1	4:23	
Preliminary Card
Lightweight 70 kg	(Russia) Adlan Bataev	def.	(Russia) Nikita Gomzyakov	Decision (Unanimous)	3	5:00	
Featherweight 66 kg	(Russia) Abdul-Rakhman Temirov	def.	(Russia) Zamir Aripshev	Decision (Unanimous)	3	5:00	
Middleweight 84 kg	(Russia) Husein Kushagov	def.	(Brazil) Antonio Marcos	KO (Punches)	1	3:40	
Bantamweight 61 kg	(Russia) Khusein Sheikhaev	def.	(Brazil) Carlos Eduardo de Oliveira	Decision (Unanimous)	3	5:00	
Bantamweight 61 kg	(Russia) Sergey Klyuev	def.	(Armenia) Grachik Engibaryan	KO (Elbows and Punches)	1	4:54	
Featherweight 66 kg	(Russia) Mehdi Baidulaev	def.	(Kyrgyzstan) Elaman Dadonov	Submission (D'Arce Choke)	1	3:20	

== ACA YE 19: Saidulaev vs. Nurzhanov ==
ACA YE 19: Saidulaev vs. Nurzhanov
- Promotion: Absolute Championship Akhmat
- Date: July 24, 2021
- Venue: Tolstoy-Yurt Arena
- City: Tolstoy-Yurt, Russia

Absolute Championship Akhmat Young Eagles 19: Saidulaev vs. Nurzhanov was a mixed martial arts event held by Absolute Championship Akhmat on July 24, 2021, at the Tolstoy-Yurt Arena in Tolstoy-Yurt, Russia.

=== Background ===
Bonus awards:

The following fighters were awarded bonuses:

- Knockout of the Night: Bay-Ali Shaipov
- Submission of the Night: Saykhan Djabrailov

=== Results ===
ACA YE 19
Weight Class				Method	Round	Time	Notes
Featherweight 66 kg	(Kyrgyzstan) Rustambek Nurzhanov	def.	(Russia) Abdul-Malik Saidullaev	TKO (Arm Injury)	1	0:31	
Welterweight 77 kg	(Russia) Bay-Ali Shaipov	def.	(Russia) Khan Kurbanov	KO (Punches)	2	2:25	
Lightweight 70 kg	(Russia) Mansur Dzhamburaev	def.	(Kyrgyzstan) Ali Mashrapov	Submission (Rear-Naked Choke)	1	3:31	
Lightweight 70 kg	(Russia) Yuriy Verenitsen	def.	(Russia) Magomed-Salah Shaptukaev	Submission (Guillotine Choke)	2	2:05	
Welterweight 77 kg	(Russia) Zelimkhan Amirov	def.	(Kyrgyzstan) Erjan Janybekov	TKO (Punches)	1	0:39	
Lightweight 70 kg	(Russia) Adam Masaev	def.	(Tajikistan) Azam Mirzoev	TKO (Punches)	1	1:44	
Featherweight 66 kg	(Russia) Imam Vitakhanov	def.	(Russia) Abdurazak Mansurov	TKO (Punches)	1	0:19	
Featherweight 66 kg	(Russia) Said-Magomed Gimbatov	def.	(Russia) Aslan Kokov	Decision (Unanimous)	3	5:00	
Flyweight 57 kg	(Russia) Aslan Tovsultanov	def.	(Russia) Artur Shogenov	TKO (Punches)	2	2:41	
Featherweight 66 kg	(Russia) Arsen Shibzukhov	def.	(Russia) Salamu Zakarov	Decision (Unanimous)	3	5:00	
Flyweight 57 kg	(Russia) Rustam Debishev	def.	(Kyrgyzstan) Mukhamedali Arykov	Submission (Rear-Naked Choke)	1	4:40	
Flyweight 57 kg	(Russia) Tamerlan Chagaev	def.	(Tajikistan) Oyatullo Muminov	Decision (Unanimous)	3	5:00	
Middleweight 84 kg	(Russia) Bekkhan Malsagov	def.	(Uzbekistan) Islom Sharopov	TKO (Punches)	1	3:11	
Light Heavyweight 93 kg	(Russia) Saykhan Kutaev	def.	(Russia) Artur Sirazhudinov	Submission (Anaconda Choke)	1	1:35	
Lightweight 70 kg	(Tajikistan) Dorobshokh Nabotov	def.	(Russia) Tamerlan Ashakhanov	Decision (Unanimous)	3	5:00	
Bantamweight 61 kg	(Russia) Talekh Gamidov	-	(Russia) Zelimkham Salatov	No Contest (Illegal Knee)	2	0:00	
Bantamweight 61 kg	(Russia) Akhmadkhan Elmurzaev	def.	(Kyrgyzstan) Zhasurbek Zholdoshev	Submission (Rear-Naked Choke)	1	4:05	
Bantamweight 61 kg	(Russia) Ibrahim Dauev	def.	(Russia) Ramazan Khaychilaev	TKO (Punches)	3	4:01	
Lightweight 70 kg	(Russia) Tornike Svanidze	def.	(Russia) Islam Indarbiev	Decision (Unanimous)	3	5:00	
Preliminary Card
Featherweight 66 kg	(Russia) Aslambek Magomadov	def.	(Russia) Ruslan Khubolov	Submission (Armbar)	1	3:56	
Flyweight 57 kg	(Russia) Alibek Gadzhammatov	def.	(Russia) Mansur Nashaev	TKO (Punches)	3	0:59	
Flyweight 57 kg	(Russia) Abubakar Khasiev	def.	(Kyrgyzstan) Saymyk Mamedaliev	TKO (Punches)	2	1:33	
Flyweight 57 kg	(Russia) Abu Maksutov	def.	(Russia) Magomed Saydalov	KO (Knee)	1	2:20	
Bantamweight 61 kg	(Russia) Bilal Alikhadzhiev	def.	(Russia) Murat Fakov	Decision (Unanimous)	3	5:00	
Bantamweight 61 kg	(Russia) Islam Datsaev	def.	(Russia) Uruzmag Karginov	TKO (Punches)	1	1:19	

== ACA YE 20: Grand Prix Semi-Finals ==
ACA YE 20: Grand Prix Semi-Finals
- Promotion: Absolute Championship Akhmat
- Date: August 16, 2021
- Venue: Sport Hall Coliseum
- City: Grozny, Russia

Absolute Championship Akhmat Young Eagles 20: Grand Prix Semi-Finalswas a mixed martial arts event held by Absolute Championship Akhmat on August 16, 2021, at the Sport Hall Coliseum in Grozny, Russia.

=== Background ===
Bonus awards:

The following fighters were awarded bonuses:

- Knockout of the Night: Baysangur Susurkaev
- Submission of the Night: Eldar Munapov

=== Results ===
ACA YE 20
Weight Class				Method	Round	Time	Notes
Bantamweight 61 kg	(Russia) Dzhaddal Alibekov	def.	(Russia) Omar Rzaev	Submission (Rear-Naked Choke)	1	1:37	
Bantamweight 61 kg	(Russia) Islam Yunusov	def.	(Russia) Omar Isakov	TKO (Punches)	2	3:37	
Lightweight 70 kg	(Russia) German Kokaev	def.	(Russia) Ali Khadashev	Decision (Unanimous)	3	5:00	Lightweight Grand Prix Semi-Finals
Featherweight 66 kg	(Russia) Dzhambulat Selimkhanov	def.	(Russia) Artem Nuzhnov	TKO (Punches)	1	4:45	Featherweight Grand Prix Semi-Finals
Featherweight 66 kg	(Russia) Basir Saraliev	def.	(Russia) Ibragim Askhabov	TKO (Doctor Stoppage)	1	2:49	Featherweight Grand Prix Semi-Finals
Bantamweight 61 kg	(Tajikistan) Khurshed Nazarov	def.	(Russia) Anzor Elgaraev	Decision (Unanimous)	3	5:00	Bantamweight Grand Prix Semi-Finals
Bantamweight 61 kg	(Russia) Asvad Akhmadov	def.	(Russia) Minkail Khusenov	Decision (Split)	3	5:00	Bantamweight Grand Prix Semi-Finals
Flyweight 57 kg	(Russia) Islam Konchiev	def.	(Russia) Salavdi Dzhamaldaev	TKO (Punches)	3	1:30	Flyweight Grand Prix Semi-Finals
Flyweight 57 kg	(Russia) Umalat Israpilov	def.	(Russia) Bashlam Amadov	Decision (Unanimous)	3	5:00	Flyweight Grand Prix Semi-Finals
Preliminary Card
Bantamweight 61 kg	(Russia) Akhmed Gakiev	def.	(Russia) Sergey Shekhkeldyan	Decision (Unanimous)	3	5:00	
Flyweight 57 kg	(Russia) Khasan Bisultanov	def.	(Tajikistan) Sherzodi Sadullo	Submission (Guillotine Choke)	3	1:43	
Welterweight 77 kg	(Russia) Girikhan Mazaev	def.	(Russia) Nikita Severov	Decision (Unanimous)	3	5:00	
Bantamweight 61 kg	(Russia) Bekkhan Musaev	def.	(Russia) Rasul Malsugenov	Decision (Unanimous)	3	5:00	
Flyweight 57 kg	(Russia) Akhmed Yasaev	def.	(Russia) Mkhitar Barsegyan	Decision (Unanimous)	3	5:00	
Welterweight 77 kg	(Russia) Magomed Bedigov	def.	(Russia) Said-Magomed Tapaev	Submission (Armbar)	2	4:46	
Flyweight 57 kg	(Russia) Eldar Munapov	def.	(Tajikistan) Kamoliddin Boymirzoev	Submission (Kneebar)	2	3:39	
Middleweight 84 kg	(Russia) Baysangur Susurkaev	def.	(Russia) Islam Sharopov	KO (Knee)	1	0:51	
Welterweight 77 kg	(Russia) Aslanbek Kodzaev	def.	(Russia) Yusup Akhmatsultanov	TKO (Punches)	2	3:25	
Bantamweight 61 kg	(Russia) Adam Musaev	def.	(Tajikistan) Amir Vakhobov	Submission (Guillotine Choke)	3	1:51	
Heavyweight 120 kg	(Russia) Zumso Zuraev	def.	(Russia) Shadid Rashidov	TKO	1		
Pre Undercard
Lightweight 70 kg	(Russia) Alikhan Musaev	def.	(Kyrgyzstan) Mayrambek Mamatrasul	Submission (Triangle Choke)	1	2:36	
Bantamweight 61 kg	(Russia) Yakhya Bulutkhanov	def.	(Russia) Ramzan Gaziev	Decision (Unanimious)	3	5:00	
Flyweight 57 kg	(Russia) Ramzan Suleymanov	def.	(Russia) Shapi Murtazaliev	Submission (Triangle Choke)	2		
Bantamweight 61 kg	(Russia) Akhmed Ibragimov	def.	(Russia) Zalim Kardanov	Submission (Rear-Naked Choke)	2		

== ACA 127: Kerefov vs. Albaskhanov ==
ACA 127: Kerefov vs. Albaskhanov
- Promotion: Absolute Championship Akhmat
- Date: August 28, 2021
- Venue: Basket-Hall Krasnodar
- City: Krasnodar, Russia

Absolute Championship Akhmat 127: Kerefov vs. Albaskhanov will be a mixed martial arts event held by Absolute Championship Akhmat on August 28, 2021, at the Basket-Hall in Krasnodar, Russia.

=== Background ===
The main event featured Azamat Kerefov who made his second ACA Flyweight title defense against the #3 ranked Rasul Albaskhanov.

A Featherweight title bout between the champion Magomedrasul Khasbulaev and the challenger Ramazan Kishev was previously scheduled for ACA 127. However, on August 4, Khasbulaev was removed from the card because of an injury, the title bout was moved to ACA 131.

Bonus awards:

The following fighters were awarded bonuses:

- $100,000 Performance of the Night: Lom-Ali Nalgiev
- $5000 Stoppage Victory Bonuses: Elkhan Musaev, Mukhumat Vakhaev, Azamat Kerefov

=== Results ===
ACA 127
Weight Class				Method	Round	Time	Notes
Flyweight 57 kg	(Russia) Azamat Kerefov (c)	def.	(Russia) Rasul Albaskhanov	Technical Submission (Anaconda Choke)	3	3:11	For the ACA Flyweight Championship
Middleweight 84 kg	(Russia) Abdul-Rahman Dzhanaev	def.	(Russia) Artem Frolov	Decision (Split)	3	5:00	
Featherweight 66 kg	(Russia) Salman Zhamaldaev	def.	(Brazil) Diego Brandão	Decision (Majority)	3	5:00	
Welterweight 77 kg	(Russia) Andrei Koshkin	def.	(Russia) Murad Abdulaev	Decision (Split)	3	5:00	
Bantamweight 61 kg	(Russia) Oleg Borisov	def.	(Russia) Islam Meshev	Decision (Majority)	3	5:00	
Preliminary Card
Lightweight 70 kg	(Russia) Lom-Ali Nalgiev	def.	(Russia) Mukhamed Kokov	Submission (Rear-Naked Choke)	3	2:18	
Heavyweight 120 kg	(Russia) Mukhumat Vakhaev	def.	(Brazil) Raphael Pessoa	KO (Punches)	1	4:28	
Flyweight 57 kg	(Russia) Kurban Gadzhiev	def.	(Russia) Azamat Pshukov	Decision (Unanimous)	3	5:00	
Light Heavyweight 93 kg	(Russia) Elkhan Musaev	def.	(Russia) Evgeniy Poskotin	Submission (Arm-Triangle Choke)	1	0:57	
Featherweight 66 kg	(Armenia) Arkadiy Osipyan	def.	(Russia) Davlatmand Chuponov	Submission (Rear-Naked Choke)	2	3:53	

== ACA 128: Goncharov vs. Omielańczuk ==
ACA 128: Goncharov vs. Omielańczuk
- Promotion: Absolute Championship Akhmat
- Date: September 11, 2021
- Venue: Falcon Arena
- City: Minsk, Belarus

Absolute Championship Akhmat 128: Goncharov vs. Omielańczuk was a mixed martial arts event held by Absolute Championship Akhmat on September 11, 2021, at the Falcon Arena in Minsk, Belarus.

=== Background ===
The event was headlined by a featherweight bout between Evgeniy Goncharov and Daniel Omielańczuk.

Bonus awards:

The following fighters were awarded bonuses:

- $50,000 Performance of the Night: Vladislav Yankovsky
- $5000 Stoppage Victory Bonuses: Ruslan Abiltarov, Tomáš Deák, Daniel James, Miguel Felipe Bunes da Silva, Aurel Pîrtea, Rafał Haratyk, Evgeny Goncharov

=== Results ===
ACA 128
Weight Class				Method	Round	Time	Notes
Heavyweight 120 kg	(Russia) Evgeniy Goncharov	def.	(Poland) Daniel Omielańczuk	TKO (Punches)	3	1:39	
Lightweight 70 kg	(Russia) Viskhan Magomadov	def.	(Belarus) Ilya Khodkevich	Decision (Unanimous)	3	5:00	
Middleweight 84 kg	(Poland) Rafał Haratyk	def.	(Russia) Azamat Bekoev	Submission (Scarf Hold)	3	3:33	
Lightweight 70 kg	(Romania) Aurel Pîrtea	def.	(Russia) Musa Khamanaev	Submission (D'arce Choke)	2	1:14	
Middleweight 84 kg	(United States) Chris Honeycutt	def.	(Russia) Arbi Agujev	Decision (Unanimous)	3	5:00	
Preliminary Card
Middleweight 84 kg	(Belarus) Vladislav Yankovsky	def.	(Ukraine) Vadim Shabadash	Submission (Kimura)	3	1:40	
Flyweight 57 kg	(Brazil) Miguel Felipe Bunes da Silva	def.	(Finland) Mikael Silander	Submission (Armbar)	2	4:35	
Middleweight 84 kg	(Poland) Bartosz Leśko	def.	(Russia) Ibragim Magomedov	DQ (Illegal Knee)	1	3:14	
Welterweight 77 kg	(Ukraine) Alexander Butenko	def.	(Lithuania) Mindaugas Veržbickas	Decision (Unanimous)	3	5:00	
Featherweight 66 kg	(Georgia (country)) Raul Tutarauli	def.	(Bulgaria) Plamen Bachvarov	Decision (Unanimous)	3	5:00	
Heavyweight 120 kg	(United States) Daniel James	def.	(Lithuania) Tomas Pakutinskas	KO (Punches)	1	4:34	
Featherweight 66 kg	(Belarus) Alexander Kovalev	def.	(Ukraine) Andrey Khokhlov	Decision (Unanimous)	3	5:00	
Bantamweight 61 kg	(Slovakia) Tomáš Deák	def.	(Russia) Emran Israfilov	Submission (Rear-Naked Choke)	3	2:56	
Flyweight 57 kg	(Ukraine) Ruslan Abiltarov	def.	(Georgia (country)) Vazha Tsiptauri	Submission (Guillotine Choke)	1	0:34	
Bantamweight 61 kg	(Belarus) Dmitriy Romanov	def.	(Belarus) Pavel Burmistrov	Decision (Unanimous)	3	5:00	

== ACA 129: Sarnavskiy vs. Magomedov ==
ACA 129: Sarnavskiy VS. Magomedov
- Promotion: Absolute Championship Akhmat
- Date: September 24, 2021
- Venue: Dynamo Palace of Sports
- City: Moscow, Russia

Absolute Championship Akhmat 129: Sarnavskiy VS. Magomedov was a mixed martial arts event held by Absolute Championship Akhmat on September 24, 2021, at the Dynamo Palace of Sports in Moscow, Russia.

=== Background ===
The event was headlined by a lightweight bout between the one-time ACA lightweight title challenger Alexander Sarnavskiy and former M-1 Global welterweight champion Rashid Magomedov.

Bonus awards:

The following fighters were awarded bonuses:

- $50,000 Performance of the Night: Pavel Gordeev
- $5000 Stoppage Victory Bonuses: Karshyga Dautbek, Alexey Polpudnikov, Leonardo Silva, Elismar Lima, Alihan Suleimanov

=== Results ===
ACA 129
Weight Class				Method	Round	Time	Notes
Lightweight 70 kg	(Russia) Alexander Sarnavskiy	def.	(Russia) Rashid Magomedov	Decision (Split)	5	5:00	
Welterweight 77 kg	(Russia) Gadzhimurad Khiramagomedov	def.	(Russia) Vitaliy Slipenko	Decision (Unanimous)	3	5:00	
Heavyweight 120 kg	(Russia) Salimgerey Rasulov	def.	(Ukraine) Dmitry Poberezhets	Decision (Unanimous)	3	5:00	
Featherweight 66 kg	(Russia) Alihan Suleimanov	def.	(Brazil) Leonardo Limberger	Submission (Guillotine Choke)	1	4:25	
Bantamweight 61 kg	(Brazil) Cleverson Silva	def.	(Russia) Shamil Shakhbulatov	Decision (Split)	3	5:00	
Preliminary Card
Featherweight 66 kg	(Brazil) Elismar Lima	def.	(Tajikistan) Bekhruz Zukhurov	KO (Punches)	3	2:34	
Lightweight 70 kg	(Russia) Pavel Gordeev	def.	(Kyrgyzstan) Zharabek Teshebaev	Submission (Rear-Naked Choke)	3	4:09	
Featherweight 66 kg	(Ukraine) Dmitry Parubchenko	def.	(Azerbaijan) Tural Ragimov	Decision (Unanimous)	3	5:00	
Light Heavyweight 93 kg	(Brazil) Leonardo Silva	def.	(Kazakhstan) Asylzhan Bakhytzhanuly	KO (Punch)	2	2:19	
Featherweight 66 kg	(Russia) Alexey Polpudnikov	def.	(Kazakhstan) Nursultan Khasymkhanov	TKO (Punches)	1	0:13	
Bantamweight 61 kg	(Kazakhstan) Karshyga Dautbek	def.	(Armenia) Valodya Aivazyan	KO (Punch to the Body)	1	2:45	
Flyweight 57 kg	(Russia) Lenar Suleimanov	def.	(Kyrgyzstan) Nureles Aidarov	Decision (Unanimous)	3	5:00	

== ACA 130: Dudaev vs. Praia ==
ACA 130: Dudaev vs. Praia
- Promotion: Absolute Championship Akhmat
- Date: October 4, 2021
- City: Grozny, Russia

Absolute Championship Akhmat 130: Dudaev vs. Praia was a mixed martial arts event held by Absolute Championship Akhmat on October 4, 2021, in Grozny, Russia.

=== Background ===
Bonus awards:

The following fighters were awarded bonuses:

- $50,000 Performance of the Night: Altynbek Mamashov
- $5000 Stoppage Victory Bonuses: Abubakar Mestoev, Murad Kalamov, Felipe Froes, Chersi Dudaev

=== Results ===
ACA 130
Weight Class				Method	Round	Time	Notes
Bantamweight 61 kg	(Russia) Abdul-Rakhman Dudaev	def.	(Brazil) Rodrigo Praia	Submission (Guillotine Choke)	1	4:04	
Heavyweight 120 kg	(Azerbaijan) Zabit Samedov	def.	(Democratic Republic of the Congo) Didier Kilola Lubika	TKO (Leg Kicks)	2	1:12	Kickboxing
Welterweight 77 kg	(Russia) Stanislav Vlasenko	def.	(Russia) Khuseyn Khaliev	Decision (Split)	3	5:00	
Welterweight 77 kg	(Russia) Chersi Dudaev	def.	(Kazakhstan) Georgy Kichigin	Submission (Arm-Triangle Choke)	3	2:28	
Flyweight 57 kg	(Brazil) Alexsandro Praia	def.	(Russia) Yunus Evloev	Decision (Unanimous)	3	5:00	
Preliminary Card
Bantamweight 61 kg	(Russia) Rustam Kerimov	def.	(Brazil) Deivi Daniel Oliveira	Decision (Unanimous)	3	5:00	
Welterweight 77 kg	(Russia) Azamat Amagov	def.	(Brazil) Irving Romero-Machado	Decision (Split)	3	5:00	
Featherweight 66 kg	(Brazil) Felipe Froes	def.	(Kazakhstan) Nurbergen Sharipov	KO (Kick to the Body)	1	2:18	
Flyweight 57 kg	(Russia) Imran Bukuev	def.	(Brazil) Maycon Silvan	Decision (Split)	3	5:00	
Welterweight 77 kg	(Kyrgyzstan) Altynbek Mamashov	def.	(Brazil) Elias Silverio	KO (Punches)	2	1:52	
Flyweight 57 kg	(Brazil) Charles Henrique	def.	(Russia) Mansur Khatuev	Decision (Unanimous)	3	5:00	
Lightweight 70 kg	(Russia) Amirkhan Adaev	def.	(Russia) Bayzet Khatkhokhu	Decision (Unanimous)	3	5:00	
Middleweight 84 kg	(Russia) Arseniy Sultanov	def.	(Russia) Alexey Efremov	Decision (Majority)	3	5:00	
Bantamweight 61 kg	(Russia) Murad Kalamov	def.	(Kyrgyzstan) Sanzhar Azhibaev	Submission (Twister)	1	1:40	
Lightweight 70 kg	(Russia) Abubakar Mestoev	def.	(Kyrgyzstan) Belek Aliev	TKO (Punch)	1	2:30	

== ACA YE 21: Midaev vs. Djakhbarov ==
ACA YE 21: Midaev vs. Djakhbarov
- Promotion: Absolute Championship Akhmat
- Date: October 11, 2021
- Venue: Tolstoy-Yurt Arena
- City: Tolstoy-Yurt, Russia

Absolute Championship Akhmat Young Eagles 21: Midaev vs. Djakhbarovwas a mixed martial arts event held by Absolute Championship Akhmat on October 11, 2021, at the Tolstoy-Yurt Arena in Tolstoy-Yurt, Russia.

=== Background ===
Bonus awards:

The following fighters were awarded bonuses:

- Fight of the Night: Dukvakha Astamirov vs. Magomed Magomedov
- Submission of the Night: Firuz Nazaraliev

=== Results ===
ACA YE 21
Weight Class				Method	Round	Time	Notes
Bantamweight 61 kg	(Russia) Rakhim Midaev	def.	(Russia) Shamil Djakhbarov	Submission (Arm-Triangle Choke)	3	3:51	
Lightweight 70 kg	(Russia) Adlan Mamaev	def.	(Kyrgyzstan) Nurzhigit Karaev	Submission (Anaconda Choke)	2	4:05	
Featherweight 66 kg	(Russia) Yusup-Khadzhi Zubariev	def.	(Kyrgyzstan) Rustambek Nurzhanov	TKO (Doctor Stoppage)	1	4:26	
Bantamweight 61 kg	(Russia) Dukvakha Astamirov	def.	(Russia) Magomed Magomedov	Submission (Rear-Naked Choke)	3	1:15	
Bantamweight 61 kg	(Russia) Said-Magomed Batukaev	def.	(Russia) Andrey Skolysh	Decision (Unanimous)	3	5:00	
Featherweight 66 kg	(Russia) Shadid Abdurzakov	def.	(Russia) Shamil Ismailov	Submission (Arm-Triangle Choke)	1	4:26	
Featherweight 66 kg	(Russia) Ortsa Saidulaev	def.	(Russia) Konstantin Cherednichenko	TKO (Head Kick and Punches)	1	0:54	
Welterweight 77 kg	(Russia) Shamil Tsakuev	def.	(Tajikistan) Jamshed Ganiev	Submission (Rear-Naked Choke)	2	2:50	
Featherweight 66 kg	(Tajikistan) Firuz Nazaraliev	def.	(Russia) Dzhabrail Maltsagov	Submission (Ninja Choke)	1	4:35	
Lightweight 70 kg	(Russia) Salamu Dadagov	def.	(Uzbekistan) Mardon Marufzhonov	Submission (Triangle Choke)	1	1:40	
Bantamweight 61 kg	(Russia) Ramzan Molochaev	def.	(Tajikistan) Said-Akhmed Khatuev	TKO (Punches)	1	1:37	
Lightweight 70 kg	(Russia) Arbi Akhmadov	def.	(Tajikistan) Bakhtovar Naimov	TKO (Punches)	1	4:12	
Lightweight 70 kg	(Russia) Ali Suleymano	def.	(Kyrgyzstan) Aybek Shakir	TKO (Punches)	1	3:01	
Bantamweight 61 kg	(Russia) Islam Babatov	def.	(Russia) Goysum Choltaev	Decision (Unanimous)	3	5:00	
Light Heavyweight 93 kg	(Tajikistan) Kurbansho Jamolov	def.	(Russia) Mansur Yunusov	Submission (Neck Crank)	2	0:49	
Bantamweight 61 kg	(Kyrgyzstan) Kalybek Arzykul	def.	(Russia) Mansur Yunusov	TKO (Punches)	2	2:16	
Welterweight 77 kg	(Russia) Yakub Suleymanov	def.	(Uzbekistan) Omadzhon Otazhonov	Decision (Unanimous)	3	5:00	
Light Heavyweight 93 kg	(Russia) Sulim Batalov	def.	(Russia) Andrey Voronchikhin	TKO (Doctor Stoppage)	1	0:52	
Lightweight 70 kg	(Russia) Nikita Kulshin	def.	(Russia) Sarkhan Guliev	Decision (Unanimous)	3	5:00	
Flyweight 66 kg	(Russia) Adam Aliev	def.	(Russia) Charmo Pashaev	Decision (Split)	3	5:00	
Featherweight 66 kg	(Russia) Umar Bakaev	def.	(Russia) Timur Saytamirov	Decision (Unanimous)	3	5:00	
Flyweight 57 kg	(Russia) Magomed Chadaev	def.	(Russia) Dzhunid Rediev	TKO (Punches and Elbows)	1	4:07	

== ACA 131: Abdulvakhabov vs. Dias ==
ACA 131: Abdulvakhabov vs. Dias
- Promotion: Absolute Championship Akhmat
- Date: November 5, 2021
- City: Moscow, Russia

Absolute Championship Akhmat 131: Abdulvakhabov vs. Dias was a mixed martial arts event held by Absolute Championship Akhmat on November 5, 2021, in Moscow, Russia.

=== Background ===
Two title fights were scheduled for the event: Abdul-Aziz Abdulvakhabov made the first title defense of his second lightweight title reign against Hacran Dias in the main event, while Magomedrasul Khasbulaev was scheduled to make the first defense of his featherweight title against Ramazan Kishev.

Bonus awards:

The following fighters were awarded bonuses:

- $50,000 Performance of the Night: Alan Gomes
- $5000 Stoppage Victory Bonuses: Mukhamed Aushev, Mikhail Dolgov, Adam Bogatyrev, Ivan Shtyrkov, Magomedrasul Khasbulaev

=== Results ===
ACA 131
Weight Class				Method	Round	Time	Notes
Lightweight 70 kg	(Russia) Abdul-Aziz Abdulvakhabov (c)	def.	(Brazil) Hacran Dias	Decision (Split)	5	5:00	For the ACA Lightweight Championship
Featherweight 66 kg	(Russia) Magomedrasul Khasbulaev (c)	def.	(Russia) Ramazan Kishev	TKO (Punches)	3	4:59	For the ACA Featherweight Championship
Light Heavyweight 93 kg	(Russia) Ivan Shtyrkov	def.	(Russia) Artur Astakhov	KO (Punches)	1	4:53	
Lightweight 70 kg	(Russia) Daud Shaikhaev	def.	(Ukraine) Samvel Vardanyan	Decision (Unanimous)	3	5:00	
Light Heavyweight 93 kg	(Russia) Amirkhan Guliev	def.	(Ukraine) Vasily Babich	TKO (Doctor Stoppage)	2	5:00	
Preliminary Card
Heavyweight 120 kg	(Russia) Adam Bogatyrev	def.	(Brazil) Gerônimo dos Santos	TKO (Punches)	1	0:40	
Flyweight 57 kg	(Brazil) Alan Gomes	def.	(Tajikistan) Azam Gaforov	KO (Punch)	1	4:57	
Bantamweight 61 kg	(Russia) Khusein Sheikhaev	def.	(Ukraine) Pavel Vitruk	Decision (Unanimous)	3	5:00	
Middleweight 84 kg	(Russia) Mikhail Dolgov	def.	(Serbia) Jovan Zdelar	Submission (Rear-Naked Choke)	3	2:43	
Bantamweight 61 kg	(Brazil) Walter Pereira	def.	(Russia) Nashkho Galaev	Decision (Unanimous)	3	5:00	
Light Heavyweight 93 kg	(Russia) Mukhamed Aushev	def.	(Russia) Roman Gudochkin	TKO (Punches)	1	3:05	
Featherweight 66 kg	(Russia) Mehdi Baidulaev	def.	(Brazil) Caionã Batista	Submission (Rear-Naked Choke)	2	2:38	
Bantamweight 61 kg	(Russia) Nikita Chistyakov	def.	(Tajikistan) Mukhitdin Kholov	TKO (Punches)	3	4:55	

== ACA YE 22: Satuev vs. Amanbaev ==
ACA YE 22: Satuev vs. Amanbaev
- Promotion: Absolute Championship Akhmat
- Date: November 12, 2021, 2021
- Venue: Tolstoy-Yurt Arena
- City: Tolstoy-Yurt, Russia

Absolute Championship Akhmat Young Eagles 22: Satuev vs. Amanbaevwas a mixed martial arts event held by Absolute Championship Akhmat on November 12, 2021, at the Tolstoy-Yurt Arena in Tolstoy-Yurt, Russia.

=== Background ===
Bonus awards:

The following fighters were awarded bonuses:

- Knockout of the Night: Abubakar Khasiev
- Submission of the Night: Amir Aliev

=== Results ===
ACA YE 22
Weight Class				Method	Round	Time	Notes
Lightweight 70 kg	(Russia) Khalid Satuev	def.	(Kyrgyzstan) Rustam Amanbaev	TKO (Punches)	2	3:45	
Middleweight 84 kg	(Russia) Magomed Zakriev	def.	(Russia) Makhmud Gaziev	Decision (Unanimous)	3	5:00	
Bantamweight 61 kg	(Russia) Magomed Ginazov	def.	(Russia) Magomed Magomedov	Submission (Rear-Naked Choke)	2	2:44	
Flyweight 57 kg	(Russia) Batukhan Baysuev	def.	(Russia) Mkhitar Barsegya	TKO (Punches)	1	2:40	
Bantamweight 61 kg	(Russia) Vadim Kadyrov	def.	(Kyrgyzstan) Zarlyk Zalkarbek	Submission (Guillotine Choke)	3	0:39	
Lightweight 70 kg	(Russia) Rustam Asuev	def.	(Russia) Yuriy Verenitsen	Decision (Unanimous)	3	5:00	
Bantamweight 61 kg	(Russia) Alkhas Abdulmezhidov	def.	(Russia) Yuriy Semenov	Decision (Unanimous)	3	5:00	
Featherweight 66 kg	(Russia) Viskhan Kadirov	def.	(Tajikistan) Mukhammad Salimov	Submission (Nina Choke)	1	2:07	
Flyweight 57 kg	(Russia) Akhmed Khamzaev	def.	(Kyrgyzstan) Shabdan Sarykov	Decision (Unanimous)	3	5:00	
Flyweight 57 kg	(Russia) Bashlam Amadov	def.	(Uzbekistan) Shukurulla Mashrapov	TKO (Elbows)	1	2:33	
Bantamweight 61 kg	(Russia) Magomed Musikhanov	def.	(Russia) Movsar Dolsaev	Decision (Unanimous)	3	5:00	
Featherweight 66 kg	(Russia) Magomed Yunusov	def.	(Russia) Shamil Ismailov	TKO (Doctor Stoppage)	1	1:53	
Flyweight 57 kg	(Russia) Abubakar Khasiev	def.	(Kazakhstan) Akylbek Nurgazy	TKO (Knees and Punches)	2	1:19	
Middleweight 84 kg	(Russia) Khuseyn Tatalaev	def.	(Russia) Magomed Midaev	Submission (Rear-Naked Choke)	1	4:00	
Light Heavyweight 93 kg	(Russia) Abdul-Rakhman Yakhyaev	def.	(Uzbekistan) Elbek Ravshanov	TKO (Elbows)	1	3:00	
Featherweight 66 kg	(Russia) Nadir Aliev	def.	(Russia) Ramzan Akhmatov	Decision (Unanimous)	3	5:00	
Bantamweight 61 kg	(Russia) Amir Aliev	def.	(Russia) Islam Datsaev	Submission (Heel Hook)	1	4:36	
Bantamweight 61 kg	(Russia) Ramzan Suleymanov	def.	(Uzbekistan) Dunyobek Toshtemirov	Technical Submission (Rear-Naked Choke)	1	3:49	
Flyweight 57 kg	(Russia) Abdulla Salamov	def.	(Russia) Ibragim Gelimbiev	Submission (Rear-Naked Choke)	3	2:37	
Flyweight 57 kg	(Russia) Ali Maltsagov	def.	(Kyrgyzstan) Nurzhigit Kochkorbay	Submission (Arm-Triangle Choke)	1	1:21	
Flyweight 57 kg	(Russia) Zelimkhan Umarov	def.	(Russia) Rizvan Batishev	TKO (Punches)	3	2:13	
Bantamweight 61 kg	(Russia) Zelimkhan Yashurkaev	def.	(Russia) Mansur Zaypulaev	Submission (Rear-Naked Choke)	3	2:02	
Featherweight 66 kg	(Russia) Magomed-Emin Dadaev	def.	(Russia) Shamil Djakhbarov	Decision (Unanimous)	3	5:00	

== ACA 132: Johnson vs. Vakhaev ==
ACA 132: Johnson vs. Vakhaev
- Promotion: Absolute Championship Akhmat
- Date: November 18, 2021
- Venue: Falcon Arena
- City: Minsk, Belarus

Absolute Championship Akhmat 132: Johnson vs. Vakhaev was a mixed martial arts event held by Absolute Championship Akhmat on November 18, 2021, at the Falcon Arena in Minsk, Belarus.

=== Background ===
Bonus awards:

The following fighters were awarded bonuses:

- $50,000 Performance of the Night: Beslan Isaev
- $5000 Stoppage Victory Bonuses: Josiel Silva, Daniel James, Nikola Dipchikov, Denis Smoldarev, Tony Johnson Jr.

=== Results ===
ACA 132
Weight Class				Method	Round	Time	Notes
Heavyweight 120 kg	(United States) Tony Johnson Jr. (c)	def.	(Russia) Mukhumat Vakhaev	TKO (Punches)	1	4:23	For the ACA Heavyweight Championship
Heavyweight 120 kg	(Estonia) Denis Smoldarev	def.	(Czech Republic) Michal Martinek	TKO (Punches)	1	0:34	
Welterweight 77 kg	(Russia) Beslan Isaev	def.	(Italy) Cristian Brinzan	KO (Punch)	1	1:52	
Middleweight 84 kg	(Bulgaria) Nikola Dipchikov	def.	(United States) Chris Honeycutt	KO (Elbows)	1	1:31	
Lightweight 70 kg	(Brazil) Herdeson Batista	def.	(Georgia (country)) Levan Makashvili	Decision (Unanimous)	3	5:00	
Preliminary Card
Bantamweight 61 kg	(Armenia) German Barsegyan	def.	(Belarus) Andrey Kalechits	Decision (Unanimous)	3	5:00	
Lightweight 70 kg	(Georgia (country)) Raul Tutarauli	def.	(Brazil) Herbert Batista	Decision (Unanimous)	3	5:00	
Heavyweight 120 kg	(United States) Daniel James	def.	(Brazil) Raphael Pessoa	TKO (Punches)	2	2:14	
Bantamweight 61 kg	(Russia) Maharbek Karginov	def.	(Russia) Khasein Shaikhaev	Decision (Majority)	3	5:00	
Lightweight 70 kg	(Russia) Adlan Bataev	def.	(Poland) Łukasz Kopera	Decision (Unanimous)	3	5:00	
Flyweight 57 kg	(Brazil) Josiel Silva	def.	(Georgia (country)) Bidzina Gavashelishvili	Submission (Triangle Choke)	2	3:43	
Bantamweight 61 kg	(Georgia (country)) Vazha Tsiptauri	def.	(Belarus) Dmitriy Romanov	Decision (Unanimous)	3	5:00	

== ACA 133: Bimarzaev vs. Lima ==
ACA 133: Bimarzaev vs. Lima
- Promotion: Absolute Championship Akhmat
- Date: December 4, 2021
- Venue: Sibur Arena
- City: Saint Petersburg, Russia

Absolute Championship Akhmat 133: Bimarzaev vs. Lima was a mixed martial arts event held by Absolute Championship Akhmat on December 4, 2021, at the Sibur Arena in Saint Petersburg, Russia.

=== Background ===
An ACA Light Heavyweight Championship bout between the champion Muslim Magomedov and Grigor Matevosyan was slated to serve as the event headliner. However, it had been postponed for health reasons of the title holder. On November 29, it was announced that Apti Bimarzaev would fight against Elismar Lima in the main event.

Bonus awards:

The following fighters were awarded bonuses:

- $50,000 Performance of the Night: Valery Myasnikov
- $5000 Stoppage Victory Bonuses: Kamil Oniszczuk, Goran Reljić, Akhmed Musakaev, Maycon Silvan

=== Results ===
ACA 133
Weight Class				Method	Round	Time	Notes
Featherweight 66 kg	(Belarus) Apti Bimarzaev	def.	(Brazil) Elismar Lima	Decision (Split)	3	5:00	
Middleweight 84 kg	(Russia) Valery Myasnikov	def.	(Brazil) Rene Pessoa	Decision (Unanimous)	3	5:00	
Bantamweight 61 kg	(Brazil) Maycon Silvan	def.	(Russia) Nikita Chistyakov	TKO (Punches)	2	4:47	
Welterweight 77 kg	(Kyrgyzstan) Tilek Mashrapov	def.	(Tajikistan) Mamurzhon Hamdamov	Decision (Unanimous)	3	5:00	
Featherweight 66 kg	(Russia) Abdul-Rakhman Temirov	def.	(Brazil) Carlos da Silva	Decision (Unanimous)	3	5:00	
Preliminary Card
Light Heavyweight 93 kg	(Russia) Elkhan Musaev	def.	(Brazil) Wagner Prado	Decision (Unanimous)	3	5:00	
Bantamweight 61 kg	(Russia) Akhmed Musakaev	def.	(Brazil) Francisco de Lima Maciel	Submission (Rear-Naked Choke)	3	4:36	
Light Heavyweight 93 kg	(Croatia) Goran Reljić	def.	(Uzbekistan) Davrbek Isakov	TKO (Elbows and Punches)	1	1:26	
Welterweight 77 kg	(Russia) Anatoliy Boyko	def.	(Russia) Bay-Ali Shaipov	Decision (Unanimous)	3	5:00	
Middleweight 84 kg	(Poland) Kamil Oniszczuk	def.	(Russia) Vladimir Fedin	TKO (Punches)	1	1:24	

== ACA 134: Bagov vs. Koshkin ==
ACA 134: Bagov vs. Koshkin
- Promotion: Absolute Championship Akhmat
- Date: December 17, 2021
- Venue: Basket-Hall Krasnodar
- City: Krasnodar, Russia

Absolute Championship Akhmat 134: Bagov vs. Koshkin was a mixed martial arts event held by Absolute Championship Akhmat on December 17, 2021, at the Basket-Hall Krasnodar in Krasnodar, Russia.

=== Background ===
An undisputed ACA Middleweight Championship bout between the champion Salamu Abdurahmanov and the interim champion Magomedrasul Gasanov was slated to serve as the event headliner. However, Abdurahmanov have to withdraw for this event due to an injury.

Bonus awards:

The following fighters were awarded bonuses:

- $50,000 Performance of the Night: Islam Omarov
- $5000 Stoppage Victory Bonuses: Murat Gugov, Ibragim Magomedov, Khusein Kushagov, Alexey Polpudnikov, Vener Galiev

=== Results ===
ACA 134
Weight Class				Method	Round	Time	Notes
Welterweight 77 kg	(Russia) Ali Bagov	def.	(Russia) Andrei Koshkin	Decision (Unanimous)	5	5:00	
Featherweight 66 kg	(Russia) Islam Omarov	def.	(Russia) Dzhihad Yunusov	Decision (Unanimous)	3	5:00	
Lightweight 70 kg	(Russia) Vener Galiev	def.	(Belarus) Artem Damkovsky	Submission (Arm-Triangle Choke)	3	4:00	
Welterweight 77 kg	(Russia) Khusein Khaliev	def.	(Ukraine) Alexander Butenko	Decision (Split)	3	5:00	
Featherweight 66 kg	(Russia) Alexey Polpudnikov	def.	(Brazil) Diego Brandão	TKO (Punches)	3	0:54	
Preliminary Card
Middleweight 84 kg	(Russia) Khusein Kushagov	def.	(Poland) Bartosz Leśko	KO (Punch)	2	1:37	
Lightweight 70 kg	(Russia) Mukhamed Kokov	def.	(Russia) Pavel Gordeev	Decision (Unanimous)	3	5:00	
Bantamweight 61 kg	(Russia) Islam Meshev	def.	(Brazil) Cleverson Silva	Decision (Split)	3	5:00	
Middleweight 84 kg	(Russia) Ibragim Magomedov	def.	(Brazil) Daniel Souza Pereira	KO (Punches)	1	1:27	
Featherweight 66 kg	(Russia) Makhochi Sagitov	def.	(Brazil) Leonardo Limberger	Decision (Split)	3	5:00	
Heavyweight 120 kg	(Russia) Murat Gugov	def.	(Ukraine) Dimitriy Mikutsa	Technical Submission (Arm-Triangle Choke)	3	4:14	

== ACA YE 25: Grand Prix Final ==
ACA YE 25: Grand Prix Final
- Promotion: Absolute Championship Akhmat
- Date: December 25, 2021
- Venue: Sport Hall Coliseum
- City: Grozny, Russia

Absolute Championship Akhmat Young Eagles 25: Grand Prix Finalwas a mixed martial arts event held by Absolute Championship Akhmat on December 25, 2021, at the Sport Hall Coliseum in Grozny, Russia.

=== Background ===
Bonus awards:

The following fighters were awarded bonuses:

- Knockout of the Night:
- Submission of the Night:

=== Results ===
ACA YE 25
Weight Class				Method	Round	Time	Notes
Flyweight 57 kg	(Russia) Islam Konchiev	def.	(Russia) Eldar Munapov	Submission (Anaconda Choke)	2	2:08	Flyweight Grand Prix Final
Bantamweight 61 kg	(Tajikistan) Khurshed Nazarov	def.	(Russia) Asvad Akhmadov	Decision (Unanimous)	5	5:00	Bantamweight Grand Prix Final
Bantamweight 61 kg	(Russia) Dzhaddal Alibekov	def.	(Russia) Alevdin Zaurov	TKO (Retirement)	1	1:09	
Bantamweight 61 kg	(Russia) Rakhim Midaev	def.	(Egypt) Ahmed Usama	Submission (Triangle Choke)	1	1:55	
Lightweight 70 kg	(Russia) Shamkhan Danaev	def.	(Azerbaijan) Orkhan Veliev	TKO (Elbow and Punches)	1	2:42	
Lightweight 70 kg	(Russia) Amir Elzhurkaev	def.	(Russia) Bakhachali Bakhachaliev	Decision (Unanimous)	3	5:00	
Lightweight 70 kg	(Russia) Abdul-Rakhman Makhazhiev	def.	(Kyrgyzstan) Nurzhigit Karaev	Submission (Armbar)	3	1:34	
Welterweight 77 kg	(Russia) Khan Kurbanov	def.	(Russia) Movsar Bokov	TKO (Punches)	2	2:44	
Lightweight 70 kg	(Russia) Yusup Umarov	def.	(Belarus) Ivan Zhvirblia	TKO (Punches)	2	3:15	
Preliminary Card
Middleweight 84 kg	(Russia) Baysangur Susurkaev	def.	(Tajikistan) Bekhruz Zukhurov	KO (Knee)	1	0:39	
Welterweight 77 kg	(Russia) Zelimkhan Amirov	def.	(Russia) Serik Azhibaev	Submission (Anaconda Choke)	1	1:45	
Featherweight 66 kg	(Russia) Akhmadkhan Bokov	def.	(Russia) Said-Magomed Gimbatov	Decision (Unanimous)	3	5:00	
Featherweight 66 kg	(Russia) Imam Vitakhanov	def.	(Russia) Nizamuddin Ramazanov	Submission (Kneebar)	2	4:36	
Lightweight 70 kg	(Russia) Adam Musaev	def.	(Russia) Shamil Mutalimov	Submission (Triangle Choke)	2	2:20	
Flyweight 57 kg	(Russia) Khasan Bisultanov	def.	(Tajikistan) Dovud Idibekov	Decision (Unanimous)	3	5:00	
Flyweight 57 kg	(Russia) Umalat Israpilov	def.	(Russia) Islam Chagarov	Submission (Triangle Choke)	1	0:52	
Bantamweight 61 kg	(Russia) Omar Rzaev	def.	(Tajikistan) Mekhrod Umarov	Decision (Unanimous)	3	5:00	
Flyweight 57 kg	(Russia) Akhmed Yasaev	def.	(Russia) Artur Oganesyan	TKO (Punches)	2	1:23	
Lightweight 70 kg	(Russia) Iliskhan Azhigov	def.	(Uzbekistan) Mardon Marufjonov	Submission (Triangle Choke)	1	0:58	
Bantamweight 61 kg	(Russia) Akhmadkhan Elmurzaev	def.	(Russia) Shamil Ismailov	Submission (Rear-Naked Choke)	1	3:43	
Heavyweight 120 kg	(Russia) Zumso Zuraev	def.	(Russia) Anton Shipachev	Submission (Kimura)	1	4:07	
Light Heavyweight 93 kg	(Russia) Sulim Batalov	def.	(Russia) Azamat Tokov	KO (Punches)	2	1:16	

== See also ==
- List of current ACA fighters
- 2021 in UFC
- 2021 in Bellator
- 2021 in ONE Championship
- 2021 in Rizin Fighting Federation
- 2021 in Konfrontacja Sztuk Walki
- 2021 in Fight Nights Global
- 2021 in Legacy Fighting Alliance
