= Tsudakhar =

Tsudakhar Цудахар Цӏудахъар
- Selo
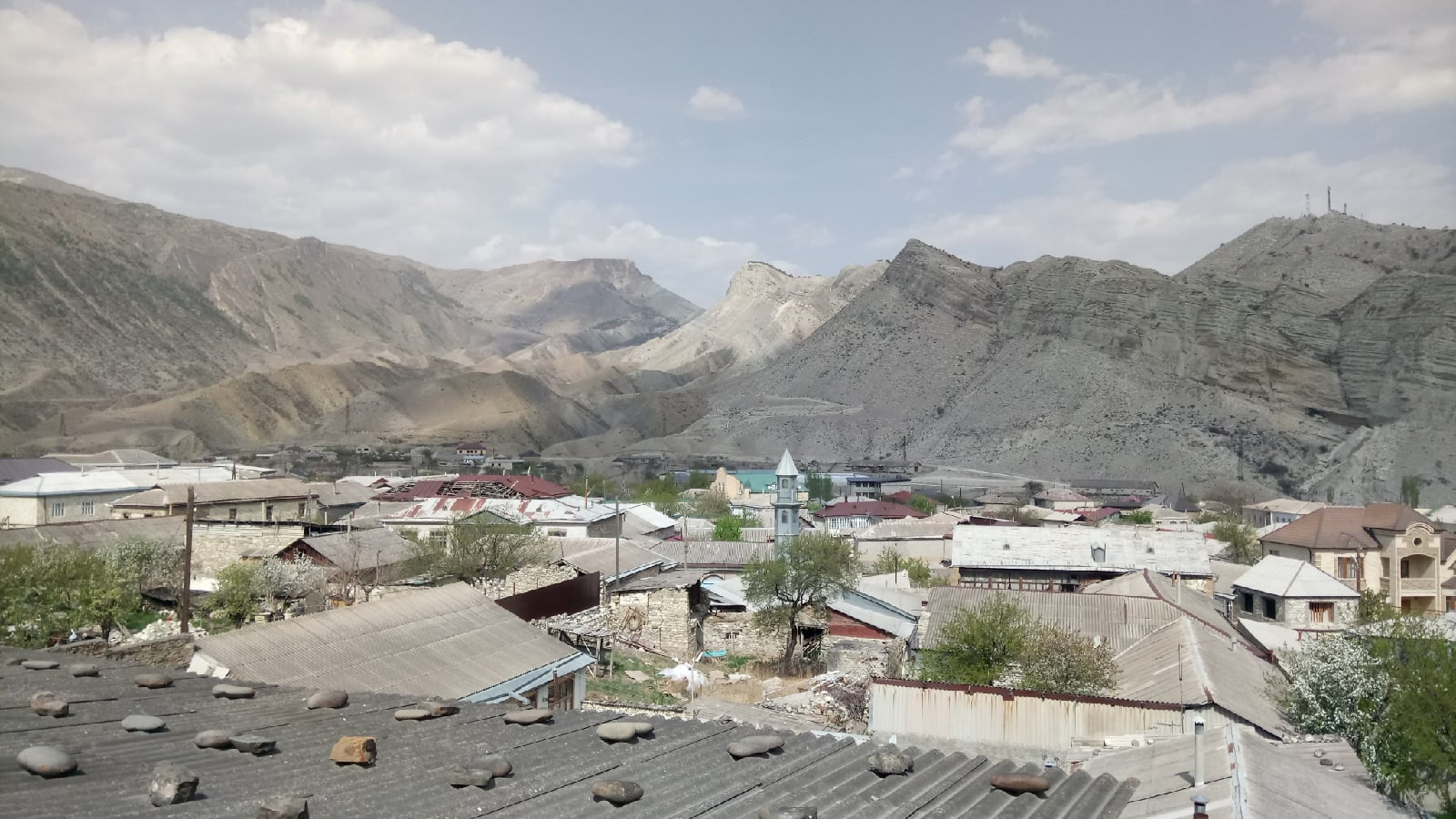

- Location within Republic of Dagestan Location within Russia
- Coordinates: 42°20′N 47°09′E
- Country: Russia
- Region: Republic of Dagestan
- District: Levashinsky District
- Time zone: UTC+3:00

Tsudakhar (Russian: Цудахар; Dargwa: Цӏудахъар, romanized: C̣udaqar) is a rural locality (a selo) and the administrative centre of Tsudakharsky Selsoviet, Levashinsky District, Republic of Dagestan, Russia. The population was 1,355 as of 2010. There are 6 streets.

== Geography ==
Tsudakhar is located 27 km southwest of Levashi (the district's administrative centre) by road, on the Kazikumukhskoye Koysu River. Inkuchimakhi and Karekadani are the nearest rural localities.

== Nationalities ==
Dargins live there.

== Famous residents ==
- Kara Karayev (commander of the Dagestan volunteer cavalry squadron)
- Magomed-Salam Umakhanov (Soviet and Dagestan political and party doer)
- Khabibulla Amirkhanov (Soviet physicist)
- Murad Gadzhiev (Russian political and social doer)
- Ruslan Magomedov (Russian mixed martial arts fighter)
