= Prigorodny District =

Location of the Republic of North Ossetia–Alania in Russia

Location of Sverdlovsk Oblast in Russia

Prigorodny District (Russian: Пригородный район) is the name of several administrative and municipal districts in Russia:

- Prigorodny District, Republic of North Ossetia-Alania, an administrative and municipal district of the Republic of North Ossetia-Alania
- Prigorodny District, Sverdlovsk Oblast, an administrative district of Sverdlovsk Oblast

== See also ==
- Prigorodny (disambiguation)
