= Raphael Pessoa =

Brazilian mixed martial arts fighter

- Born: March 9, 1989 (age 37); Rio de Janeiro, Brazil
- Other names: Bebezão
- Height: 6 ft 4 in (193 cm)
- Weight: 247 lb (112 kg; 17 st 9 lb)
- Division: Heavyweight
- Reach: 78.0 in (198 cm)
- Stance: Orthodox
- Fighting out of: Rio de Janeiro, Brazil
- Team: Team New Corpore
- Years active: 2016–present

Mixed martial arts record
- Total: 17
- Wins: 10
- By knockout: 6
- By submission: 1
- By decision: 3
- Losses: 7
- By knockout: 5
- By submission: 1
- By decision: 1

Other information
- Mixed martial arts record from Sherdog

Raphael Pessoa (born March 9, 1989) is a Brazilian mixed martial artist who competes in the Heavyweight division. He also formerly competed in the Ultimate Fighting Championship (UFC) and Absolute Championship Akhmat (ACA)

== Mixed martial arts career ==
=== Early career ===
Pessoa fought mostly in Rio de Janeiro for NCE promotion, amassing an undefeated 9–0 record while also winning the NCE Heavyweight Title.

=== Ultimate Fighting Championship ===
Pessoa made his promotional debut on 10 August 2019 at UFC Fight Night: Shevchenko vs. Carmouche 2 against Ciryl Gane. Pessoa lost the fight by an arm triangle choke at the end of the first round.

Pessoa faced Jeff Hughes on October 26, 2019, at UFC on ESPN+ 20. He won the fight via unanimous decision.

Pessoa was expected to face Justin Tafa in a heavyweight bout at UFC Fight Night: Whittaker vs. Till on July 26, 2020. However, Tafa pulled out on July 15 for unknown reasons and was replaced by Tanner Boser. He lost the fight via technical knockout in round two.

Pessoa tested positive for banned substance hydrochlorothiazide (HCTZ) and its metabolites chlorothiazide and 4-amino-6-chloro-1,3-benzenedisulfonamide (ACB) in a sample collected in an out-of-competition test on March 4. Pessoa was given a USADA suspension of one year retroactive from the date the positive sample was collected, making him eligible to return on March 4, 2021. Due to laboratory closures caused by the coronavirus pandemic, Pessoa was able to fight 5 months after the positive test was collected, losing to Tanner Boser via second-round TKO.

Pessoa is suspended by USADA for the second time for 2 years for positive for banned substance 7-Keto-DHEA and AOD-9064 Hydrochlorothiazide (HCTZ) and its metabolites Chlorothiazide and 4-amino-6-chloro-1,3-benzenedisulfonamide (ACB). The samples were collected from out-of-competition on February 9, 2021, February 15, 2021, February 16, 2021, and March 4, 2021. Ressoa also evaded sample collection on January 25, 2021, and January 28, 2021. The suspension retroactive from February 9, 2021, and he is eligible to fight again in February 2023.

=== Post UFC ===
After his second suspension, Pessoa was released from the UFC. His first bout outside of the UFC was on August 28, 2021, against Mukhumat Vakhaev at ACA 127: Kerefov vs. Albaskhanov. Pessoa lost the bout via KO at the end of the first round.

Pessoa faced Daniel James at November 18, 2021, at ACA 132: Johnson vs. Vakhaev. He lost the bout via ground and pound TKO in the second round.

Pessoa faced Adam Bogatyrev on July 22, 2022, at ACA 141. He lost the bout via TKO stoppage early in the first round.

== Mixed martial arts record ==
Professional record breakdown
17 matches	10 wins	7 losses
By knockout	6	5
By submission	1	1
By decision	3	1

Res.	Record	Opponent	Method	Event	Date	Round	Time	Location	Notes
Loss	10–7	Michael Smolik	Decision (unanimous)	We Love MMA 79	May 10, 2025	3	5:00	Düsseldorf, Germany	Middleweight debut.
Loss	10–6	Boris Mbarga Atangana	TKO (punches)	The King of Fighters 13	January 24, 2025	1	2:06	Nantes, France	
Loss	10–5	Adam Bogatyrev	TKO (punches)	ACA 141	July 22, 2022	1	1:08	Sochi, Russia	
Loss	10–4	Daniel James	TKO (punches)	ACA 132	November 18, 2021	2	2:14	Minsk, Belarus	
Loss	10–3	Mukhomad Vakhaev	KO (punches)	ACA 127	August 28, 2021	1	4:28	Krasnodar, Russia	
Loss	10–2	Tanner Boser	TKO (punches)	UFC Fight Night: Whittaker vs. Till	July 26, 2020	2	2:36	Abu Dhabi, United Arab Emirates	
Win	10–1	Jeff Hughes	Decision (unanimous)	UFC Fight Night: Maia vs. Askren	October 26, 2019	3	5:00	Kallang, Singapore	
Loss	9–1	Ciryl Gane	Submission (arm-triangle choke)	UFC Fight Night: Shevchenko vs. Carmouche 2	10 August 2019	1	4:12	Montevideo, Uruguay	
Win	9–0	Brian Heden	TKO (punches)	LFA 50	September 21, 2018	1	1:39	Prior Lake, Minnesota, United States	
Win	8–0	Wagner Maia	Decision (unanimous)	Shooto Brazil 78	November 26, 2017	3	5:00	Rio de Janeiro, Brazil	
Win	7–0	Diego Sagat	TKO (punches)	DC Fighters 1	August 26, 2017	1	0:23	Rio de Janeiro, Brazil	
Win	6–0	Carlos Alexandre	TKO (punches)	New Corpore Extreme 16	July 15, 2017	1	2:56	Rio de Janeiro, Brazil	Defended the NCE Heavyweight Championship.
Win	5–0	Luan Mendes Oliveira	TKO (punches)	Full Fight 1	June 11, 2017	1	0:48	Rio de Janeiro, Brazil	
Win	4–0	Leonardo Alves	Decision (unanimous)	New Corpore Extreme 13	May 13, 2017	3	5:00	Rio de Janeiro, Brazil	Won the vacant NCE Heavyweight Championship.
Win	3–0	Fábio Marongiu	TKO (retirement)	New Corpore Extreme 11	March 18, 2017	2	5:00	Rio de Janeiro, Brazil	
Win	2–0	Romulo Ismael	Submission (kimura)	New Corpore Extreme 10	February 4, 2017	1	1:34	Rio de Janeiro, Brazil	
Win	1–0	Bruno Luiz Nicolau	KO	New Corpore Extreme 9	December 10, 2016	1	0:26	Rio de Janeiro, Brazil	

== See also ==
- List of current ACA fighters
- List of male mixed martial artists
