= Ruslan Magomedov =

Russian mixed martial arts fighter (born 1986)

Ruslan Magomedov Руслан Магомедов
- Born: 26 November 1986 (age 39); Tsudakhar, Dagestan ASSR, Russian SFSR, Soviet Union
- Other names: Leopard
- Nationality: Russian
- Height: 6 ft 3 in (1.91 m)
- Weight: 236 lb (107 kg; 16.9 st)
- Division: Super Heavyweight; Heavyweight
- Reach: 78 in (198 cm)
- Stance: Orthodox
- Fighting out of: Dagestan, Russia
- Team: Akhmat Fight Club; Berkut Fight Club; SC Bazarganova; American Kickboxing Academy (until 2016)
- Years active: 2010–2021

Mixed martial arts record
- Total: 19
- Wins: 15
- By knockout: 4
- By submission: 2
- By decision: 9
- Losses: 4
- By knockout: 3
- By decision: 1

Other information
- Mixed martial arts record from Sherdog

Ruslan Gadzhimagomedovich Magomedov (Russian: Руслан Гаджимагомедович Магомедов; born 26 November 1986) is a Russian former mixed martial artist, who competed in the Heavyweight division. Magomedov was the first UFC fighter to receive lifetime ban from USADA after sustaining his third anti-doping violation in February 2019. He is ranked #8 in the ACA heavyweight rankings.

== Mixed martial arts career ==
=== Early career ===
Magomedov was born 26 November 1986 in Tsudakhar, Levashinsky District, Dagestan ASSR, Russian SFSR, Soviet Union. He is an ethnic Dargin and a devout Sunni Muslim. At the age of eight he began to train in Karate, Amateur boxing and Muay Thai under Igor Ivanov. After higher school, he joined the Russian Army Strategic Missile Troops in Yekaterinburg and Irkutsk, in the army he won national Army hand-to-hand fight championships, he is Second lieutenant, after the army he started MMA.

Magomedov made his professional MMA debut in November 2008 and went 9–1 in his first 10 fights.

Ruslan trains in Russian MMA Academy. He sparred with Olympic Wrestling Champions from the Dagestan Republic. Ruslan has shown good boxing technique, as he has four victories coming by way of knockout.

He defeated former UFC Heavyweight Champion Ricco Rodriguez via unanimous decision at United Glory 15.

=== Bellator MMA ===
In April 2012, Ruslan signed a contract with Bellator Fighting Championships.

Magomedov was expected to compete in the Bellator season seven heavyweight tournament, and was expected to face Brett Rogers in the quarterfinals at Bellator 75. However, Magomedov was forced out of the bout with a visa problems and replaced by Alexander Volkov.

=== Fight Nights MMA ===
Magomedov faced Strikeforce veteran and Cage Warriors Heavyweight Champion Mike Hayes on 23 February 2013 on Fight Nights: Battle of Moscow 10. He won via unanimous decision.

Magomedov faced former UFC Heavyweight Champion Tim Sylvia on 27 October 2013 on Fight Nights: Battle of Moscow 13. He won the fight via unanimous decision.

=== Ultimate Fighting Championship ===
In February 2014, Magomedov signed a contract with the UFC to fight in their Heavyweight division.

Magomedov made his UFC debut against fellow newcomer Viktor Pešta on 31 May 2014 at UFC Fight Night 41. By this time, Magomedov was splitting his training between the MMA Academy in Russia and Jackson/Winklejohn MMA in Albuquerque, USA. He won the fight by unanimous decision.

Magomedov was briefly linked to a bout with Ben Rothwell for on 30 August 2014 at UFC 177. However, on 9 July, the UFC announced Rothwell would be facing Alistair Overeem on 5 September 2014 at UFC Fight Night 50. Magomedov eventually was linked to a bout with Richard Odoms on the same card. However, on 14 August, it was announced that the bout would be scrapped due to an injury from Odoms.

Magomedov faced Josh Copeland on 22 November 2014 at UFC Fight Night 57. He won the fight via unanimous decision.

Magomedov faced Shawn Jordan on 3 October 2015 at UFC 192. He won via unanimous decision.

Magomedov was expected to face Gabriel Gonzaga on 10 April 2016 at UFC Fight Night 86. However, Magomedov was forced from the bout in early March due to injury and replaced by Derrick Lewis.

Magomedov was expected to face Stefan Struve on 8 October 2016 at UFC 204, but had to pull out with injury.

On 26 September 2016 Magomedov was suspended by USADA, the administrator of the UFC anti-doping program following a potential Anti-Doping Policy violation stemming from an out-of-competition sample collection made on 7 September 2016 In February 2018, it was announced that Magomedov had received a two years USADA suspension after testing positive for ostarine in relation to a sample collected on 29 October 2016. In addition, Magomedov along with teammate Zubaira Tukhugov agreed to pay a total of 10,000 US Dollars towards arbitration costs.

Magomedov was scheduled to face Marcos Rogerio de Lima on 3 November 2018 at UFC 230. However, it was reported on 24 October 2018 that he pulled out from the event due to visa issues and he was replaced by Adam Wieczorek.

In April 2019, Magomedov received a lifetime ban from USADA after sustaining his second and third violations under the policy. Magomedov tested positive for two anabolic steroids in October 2018 and then in February 2019 refused to complete the sample collection process as requested by a doping control officer during an out-of-competition test session.

=== Post-UFC career ===
After the ban, Magomedov signed with the Absolute Championship Akhmat. He made his promotional debut against Daniel James at ACA 101: Strus vs. Nemchinov on 15 November 2019. He won the fight via unanimous decision.

He made his sophomore appearance against Dmitry Poberezhets at ACA 115: Magomed Ismailov vs. Shtyrkov on 12 December 2020. He was knocked out cold in the third round.

Magomedov faced Denis Smoldarev on 16 July 2021 at ACA 126: Magomedov vs. Egemberdiev. He lost the bout via split decision.

== Mixed martial arts record ==
Professional record breakdown
19 matches	15 wins	4 losses
By knockout	4	3
By submission	2	0
By decision	9	1

Res.	Record	Opponent	Method	Event	Date	Round	Time	Location	Notes
Loss	15–4	Mikhail Mokhnatkin	TKO (knee injury)	Ural FC x Ozon: Akhmedov vs. Cavaleiro	17 October 2025	1	5:00	Kaspiysk, Russia	
Loss	15–3	Denis Smoldarev	Decision (split)	ACA 126	16 July 2021	3	5:00	Sochi, Russia	
Loss	15–2	Dmitry Poberezhets	KO (punches)	ACA 115	12 December 2020	3	0:30	Moscow, Russia	
Win	15–1	Daniel James	Decision (unanimous)	ACA 101	15 November 2019	3	5:00	Warsaw, Poland	
Win	14–1	Shawn Jordan	Decision (unanimous)	UFC 192	3 October 2015	3	5:00	Houston, Texas, United States	
Win	13–1	Josh Copeland	Decision (unanimous)	UFC Fight Night: Edgar vs. Swanson	22 November 2014	3	5:00	Austin, Texas, United States	
Win	12–1	Viktor Pešta	Decision (unanimous)	UFC Fight Night: Munoz vs. Mousasi	31 May 2014	3	5:00	Berlin, Germany	
Win	11–1	Tim Sylvia	Decision (unanimous)	Fight Nights: Battle of Moscow 13	27 October 2013	3	5:00	Moscow, Russia	Super Heavyweight bout.
Win	10–1	Mike Hayes	Decision (unanimous)	Fight Nights: Battle of Moscow 10	23 February 2013	3	5:00	Moscow, Russia	
Win	9–1	Amir Aliskerov	Decision (unanimous)	Dictator FC 1	28 June 2012	2	5:00	Moscow, Russia	
Win	8–1	Igor Zadernovsky	Submission (guillotine choke)	League S-70: 2011 Russian Grand Prix (Stage 3)	6 April 2012	3	3:29	Moscow, Russia	
Win	7–1	Ricco Rodriguez	Decision (unanimous)	United Glory 15	23 March 2012	3	5:00	Moscow, Russia	
Win	6–1	Vitalii Yalovenko	Decision (unanimous)	Fight Nights: Battle of Moscow 4	7 July 2011	2	5:00	Moscow, Russia	
Loss	5–1	Konstantin Gluhov	KO (punch to the body)	Warrior's Honor 3	27 May 2011	2	1:19	Kharkiv, Ukraine	2011 Warrior's Honour Heavyweight Tournament Final.
Win	5–0	Vagan Bodzhukyan	TKO (punches)	Warrior's Honor 3	27 May 2011	2	3:12	Kharkiv, Ukraine	2011 Warrior's Honour Heavyweight Tournament Semifinal.
Win	4–0	Anatoliy Nosyrev	Submission (armbar)	ProFC 26	9 April 2011	1	0:28	Rostov-on-Don, Russia	
Win	3–0	Magomedtagir Magomedov	TKO (punches)	ProFC 22	17 December 2010	1	1:30	Rostov-on-Don, Russia	
Win	2–0	Murad Magomedov	TKO (punches)	ProFC 19	13 November 2010	1	2:30	Taganrog, Russia	Won the 2010 ProFC Cup of Russia Heavyweight Tournament.
Win	1–0	Rasul Musrailov	TKO (doctor stoppage)	ProFC 19	13 November 2010	1	3:43	Taganrog, Russia	Heavyweight debut. 2010 ProFC Cup of Russia Heavyweight Tournament Semifinal.

== Filmography ==
Year	Title	Role	Notes
2014	Friendship of peoples (on the TNT)	Khabib	TV series

== See also ==
- List of current UFC fighters
- List of male mixed martial artists
