= Daniel James (fighter) =

American mixed martial artist

- Born: December 31, 1981 (age 44); Chicago, Illinois, U.S.
- Other names: The American Predator
- Height: 6 ft 6 in (1.98 m)
- Weight: 264 lb (120 kg; 18 st 12 lb)
- Division: Heavyweight
- Reach: 82 in (208 cm)
- Fighting out of: Chicago, Illinois, U.S.
- Team: Midwest Training Center
- Rank: Purple belt in Brazilian jiu-jitsu
- Years active: 2014–present

Mixed martial arts record
- Total: 27
- Wins: 17
- By knockout: 13
- By submission: 3
- By decision: 1
- Losses: 8
- By knockout: 1
- By submission: 1
- By decision: 5
- By disqualification: 1
- Draws: 1
- No contests: 1

Other information
- Mixed martial arts record from Sherdog

Daniel James (born December 31, 1981) is an American mixed martial artist who competes in the Heavyweight division of the Rizin Fighting Federation.

== Background ==
Growing up on the west side of Chicago, James resided in his childhood in neighbourhoods that were filled with violence and drugs. However, he was able to avoid getting involved in them through athletics and sports. He gained his nickname, "The American Predator", from his uncle due to his characteristic dreadlocks. He spends much of his free time running programs for children to keep them out of trouble.

James has a career as a fitness trainer at Reach Fieldhouse in Chicago, where he runs multiple fitness programs. Likewise, he travelled the world as a former celebrity bodyguard, still partaking in the endeavor from time to time, including working for the rapper Twista.

== Mixed martial arts career ==
=== Early career ===
Debuting at in 2014 at Bellator 112 against Erick Correa, a bout in which he won via second round retirement, James went 7–3–1 fighting around the American Midwest scene, facing such opponents like Daniel Gallemore.

After going 2–0 in the LFA with impressive knockouts against Calyn Hull via second-round knockout on September 21, 2018, at LFA 50 and Patrick Martin via TKO stoppage at the end of the first round on May 24, 2019, at LFA 67, James advanced to the finals of the LFA Heavyweight tournament against Brett Martin. However, the bout for the vacant LFA Heavyweight Championship against Martin on September 27, 2019, at LFA 77, ended in controversy as Martin missed weight for the bout coming in at 272.6 pounds, 6.6 lbs over the weight limit, and James went on to lose the bout via disqualification in the 5th round after throwing illegal knees against the fence.

=== Absolute Championship Akhmat ===
James signed with the Absolute Championship Akhmat, making his promotional debut against Ruslan Magomedov at ACA 101: Strus vs. Nemchinov on November 15, 2019, losing the fight via unanimous decision.

In his sophomore appearance against Michal Martínek on November 26, 2020, at ACA 114: Omielańczuk vs. Johnson, James would win the bout in the second round, trapping his opponent in a crucifix and finishing the bout via elbows and punches.

James faced Daniel Omielańczuk on April 23, 2021, at ACA 122, losing the bout via unanimous decision.

James would rebound against Tomas Pakutinskas on September 11, 2021, at ACA 128: Goncharov vs. Omielańczuk, winning the bout at the end of the first round as Pakutinskas submitted due to punches.

James faced Raphael Pessoa at November 18, 2021 at ACA 132: Johnson vs. Vakhaev, winning the bout via ground and pound TKO in the second round.

In what would be his last bout with the promotion, James faced Denis Smoldarev on February 26, 2022, at ACA 136: Bukuev vs Akopyan, winning the bout via TKO stoppage in the first round.

=== Bellator MMA ===
A heavyweight bout between Davion Franklin on May 6, 2022, at Bellator 280. However, James failed an out of competition drug test and was pulled from the bout.

James faced Tyrell Fortune on November 18, 2022, at Bellator 288, pulling off a comeback and finishing Fortune in the second round via ground and pound. The bout was later overturned to a no contest after James tested positive for an anabolic substance on a test before the bout.

James faced Marcelo Golm on March 31, 2023, at Bellator 293. He won the fight via technical knockout in the third round.

James faced Gökhan Saricam on June 16, 2023, at Bellator 297. He lost the bout via unanimous decision.

James was scheduled to face Ali Isaev on November 17, 2023, at Bellator 301. The week of the event, the bout was scrapped for unknown reasons.

=== PFL ===
James was set to debut with the Professional Fighters League (PFL) at PFL 1 on April 4, 2024, in a rematch against Tyrell Fortune. However, Fortune withdrew from the bout and was replaced by Marcelo Golm in a rematch bout that James won by technical knockout at the end of the first round. James missed weight, so he was fined a percentage of his purse and given a point deduction in the standings.

James was then again set to rematch Fortune this time at PFL 4 on June 13, 2024, but withdrew from the bout due to an unknown reason and was replaced by Marcelo Golm.

On September 17, 2024, it was announced that James tested positive for bis-(4-cyanophenyl) methanol, a metabolite of letrozole, as the result of an out-of-competition sample collected on May 8, 2024. He was suspended for 10 months for this infraction, making him eligible to return on January 8, 2025.

=== Karate Combat ===
James competed in the 8-man heavyweight tournament July 18, 2025 at Karate Combat 55 and defeated Braxton Smith by technical knockout in the first round. For the semi-finals, he lost to Zac Pauga by unanimous decision.

== Personal life ==
James has four children, two sons and two daughters.

== Mixed martial arts record ==
Professional record breakdown
27 matches	17 wins	8 losses
By knockout	13	1
By submission	3	1
By decision	1	5
By disqualification	0	1
Draws	1	
No contests	1	

Res.	Record	Opponent	Method	Event	Date	Round	Time	Location	Notes
Win	17–8–1 (1)	Jake Heun	TKO (punches)	Gamebred Bareknuckle MMA 12	October 2, 2026	1	3:56	Santo Domingo, Dominican Republic	Gamebred FC Heavyweight Grand Prix Quarterfinal.
Win	16–8–1 (1)	Timothy Johnson	KO (punch)	Gamebred Bareknuckle MMA 10	May 1, 2026	3	1:45	Miami, Florida, United States	Gamebred FC Heavyweight Tournament Round of 16.
Loss	15–8–1 (1)	Marek Samociuk	Decision (unanimous)	Rizin: Otoko Matsuri	May 4, 2025	3	5:00	Tokyo, Japan	2025 Rizin Heavyweight Grand Prix Quarterfinal; James missed weight (266.3 lb).
Win	15–7–1 (1)	Marcelo Golm	TKO (punches)	PFL 1 (2024)	April 4, 2024	1	4:59	San Antonio, Texas, United States	Catchweight (267 lb) bout; James missed weight.
Loss	14–7–1 (1)	Gökhan Saricam	Decision (unanimous)	Bellator 297	June 16, 2023	3	5:00	Chicago, Illinois, United States	
Win	14–6–1 (1)	Marcelo Golm	TKO (punches)	Bellator 293	March 31, 2023	3	0:26	Temecula, California, United States	
NC	13–6–1 (1)	Tyrell Fortune	NC (overturned)	Bellator 288	November 18, 2022	2	0:27	Chicago, Illinois, United States	Originally a TKO (punches and elbows) win for James; overturned after he tested positive for anabolic substance.
Win	13–6–1	Denis Smoldarev	TKO (punches)	ACA 136	February 26, 2022	1	1:41	Moscow, Russia	
Win	12–6–1	Raphael Pessoa	TKO (punches)	ACA 132	November 18, 2021	2	2:14	Minsk, Belarus	
Win	11–6–1	Tomas Pakutinskas	TKO (submission to punch)	ACA 128	September 11, 2021	1	4:34	Minsk, Belarus	
Loss	10–6–1	Daniel Omielańczuk	Decision (unanimous)	ACA 122	April 23, 2021	3	5:00	Minsk, Belarus	
Win	10–5–1	Michal Martínek	TKO (elbows and punches)	ACA 114	November 26, 2020	2	3:32	Łódź, Poland	
Loss	9–5–1	Ruslan Magomedov	Decision (unanimous)	ACA 101	November 15, 2019	3	5:00	Warsaw, Poland	
Loss	9–4–1	Brett Martin	DQ (illegal knees)	LFA 77	September 27, 2019	5	1:12	Prior Lake, Minnesota, United States	For the vacant LFA Heavyweight Championship.
Win	9–3–1	Patrick Martin	TKO (punches)	LFA 67	May 24, 2019	1	4:45	Branson, Missouri, United States	
Win	8–3–1	Calyn Hull	KO (punches)	LFA 50	September 21, 2018	2	0:32	Prior Lake, Minnesota, United States	
Win	7–3–1	Zach Rosol	Submission (kimura)	Victory FC: Fight Night Waterloo 2	November 22, 2017	3	4:58	Waterloo, Iowa, United States	
Loss	6–3–1	Daniel Gallemore	Submission (guillotine choke)	Victory FC 57	May 5, 2017	1	1:24	Topeka, Kansas, United States	For the Victory FC Heavyweight Championship.
Win	6–2–1	Chris Beal	TKO (punches)	Xtreme Fighting Organization 60	March 11, 2017	2	0:38	Chicago, Illinois, United States	
Draw	5–2–1	John Hawk	Draw (majority)	Big Guns 21	November 19, 2016	3	5:00	Tallmadge, Ohio, United States	
Loss	5–2	Arnold Adams	TKO (punches)	Hossier FC 27	February 6, 2016	1	2:06	Michigan City, Indiana, United States	For the Hoosier FC Heavyweight Championship.
Win	5–1	Pat Harman	Submission (rear-naked choke)	Hossier FC 25	September 25, 2015	1	2:33	Hammond, Indiana, United States	
Win	4–1	Jason Walraven	Submission (kimura)	Super Brawl Showdown 1	January 30, 2015	1	2:55	Phoenix, Arizona, United States	
Win	3–1	Aaron Ware	Decision (unanimous)	Xtreme Fighting Organization 54	November 22, 2014	3	5:00	Chicago, Illinois, United States	
Win	2–1	Ryan Pokryfky	TKO (punches)	Xtreme Fighting Organization 53	October 11, 2014	2	3:38	Chicago, Illinois, United States	
Loss	1–1	Leroy Johnson	Decision (unanimous)	NAAFS: Fight Night In The Flats 10	June 7, 2014	3	5:00	Cleveland, Ohio, United States	
Win	1–0	Erick Correa	TKO (retirement)	Bellator 112	March 14, 2014	2	4:30	Hammond, Indiana, United States	Heavyweight debut.

== Karate Combat record ==
Professional record breakdown
2 matches	1 win	1 loss
By knockout	1	0
By decision	0	1

Res.	Record	Opponent	Method	Event	Date	Round	Time	Location	Notes
Loss	1–1	Zac Pauga	Decision (unanimous)	Karate Combat 55	July 18, 2025	2	3:00	Miami, Florida, United States	Last Man Standing Semifinal.
Win	1–0	Braxton Smith	TKO (punches)	Karate Combat 55	July 18, 2025	1	1:42	Miami, Florida, United States	Last Man Standing Quarterfinal.

== See also ==
- List of current Rizin Fighting Federation fighters
- List of male mixed martial artists
