= Tolstoy-Yurt =

Rural locality in Chechnya, Russia

Coordinates: 43°26′45″N 45°46′36″E

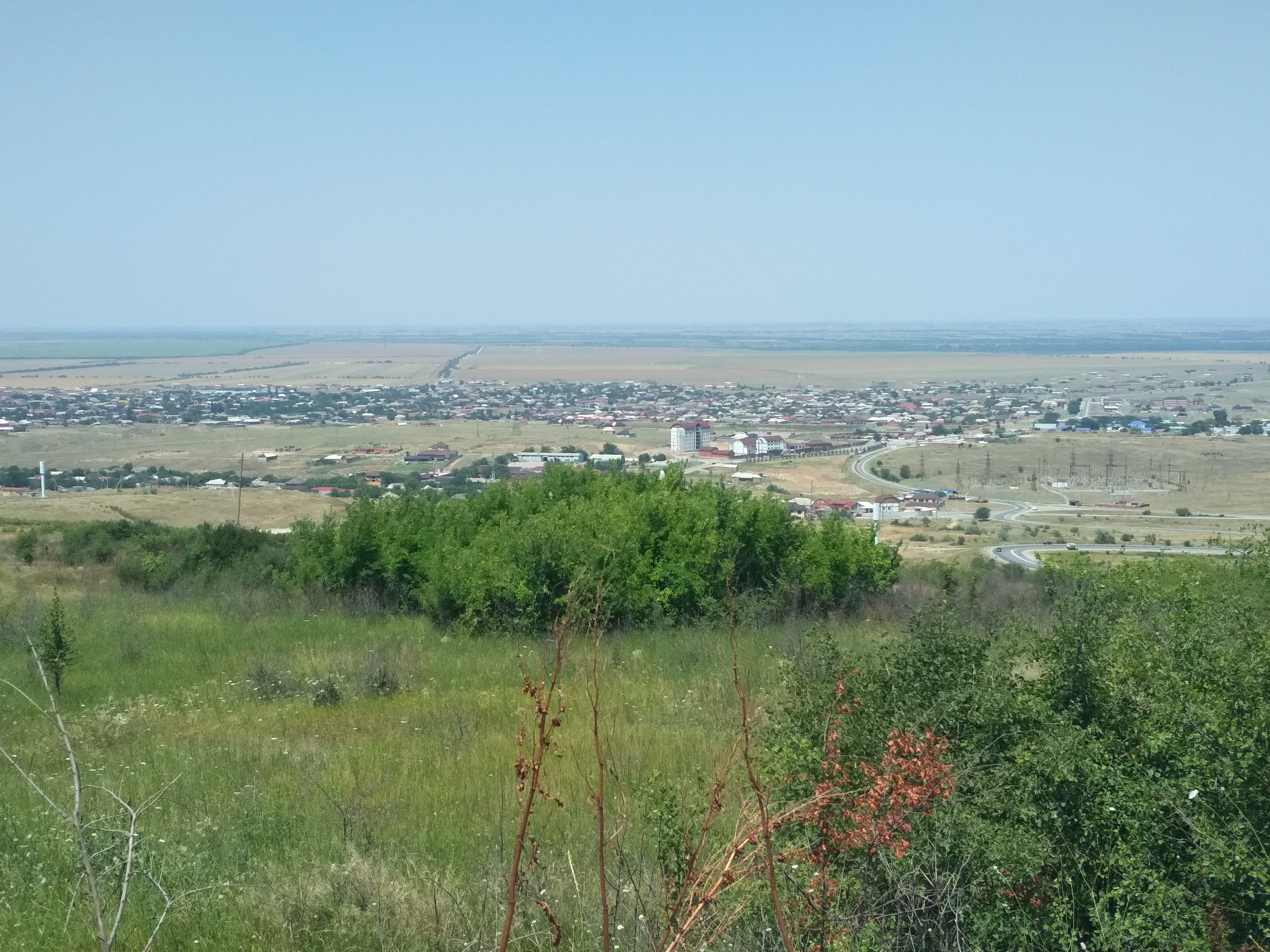
Tolstoy-Yurt

Tolstoy-Yurt (Russian: Толстой-Юрт; Chechen: Девкар-Эвла, romanized: Devkar-Evla) is a rural locality (a selo) and the administrative center of Groznensky District of the Chechen Republic, Russia. Population: 8,097 (2010 census); 7,755 (2002 census). The town is named after the Russian author Leo Tolstoy.

In 2005, Aslan Maskhadov, the third president of the self-proclaimed Chechen Republic of Ichkeria, was reportedly killed in fighting in the locality of Tolstoy-Yurt. Maskhadov was reportedly killed when a Russian special forces soldier threw a grenade into his bunker.
