= Groznensky District =

Groznensky District Грозненский район (Russian)
- District

Other transcription(s)
  - Chechen: Соьлжа-ГӀалин кӀошт
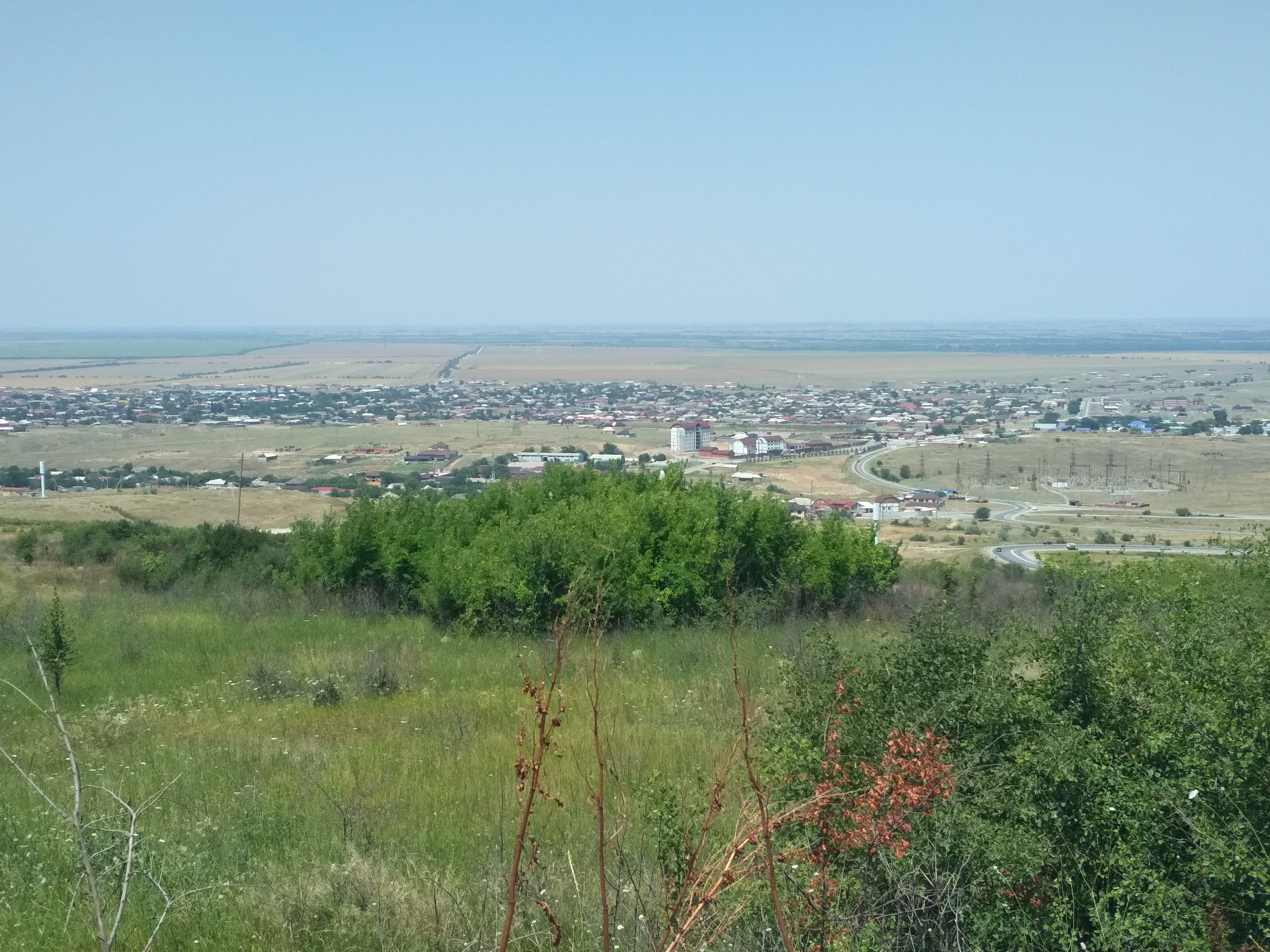
- Town in Groznensky District

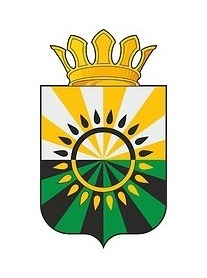
- Flag Coat of arms
- Location of Groznensky District in the Chechen Republic
- Coordinates: 43°19′N 45°41′E
- Country: Russia
- Federal subject: Chechen Republic
- Established: 1934
- Administrative center: Tolstoy-Yurt

Area
  - Total: 1,600 km^{2} (620 sq mi)

Population (2010 Census)
  - Total: 118,347
  - Density: 74/km^{2} (190/sq mi)
  - Urban: 0%
  - Rural: 100%

Administrative structure
  - Administrative divisions: 24 rural administration
  - Inhabited localities: 40 rural localities

Municipal structure
  - Municipally incorporated as: Groznensky Municipal District
  - Municipal divisions: 0 urban settlements, 25 rural settlements
- Time zone: UTC+3 (MSK)
- OKTMO ID: 96607000
- Website: http://www.grozraion.ru/

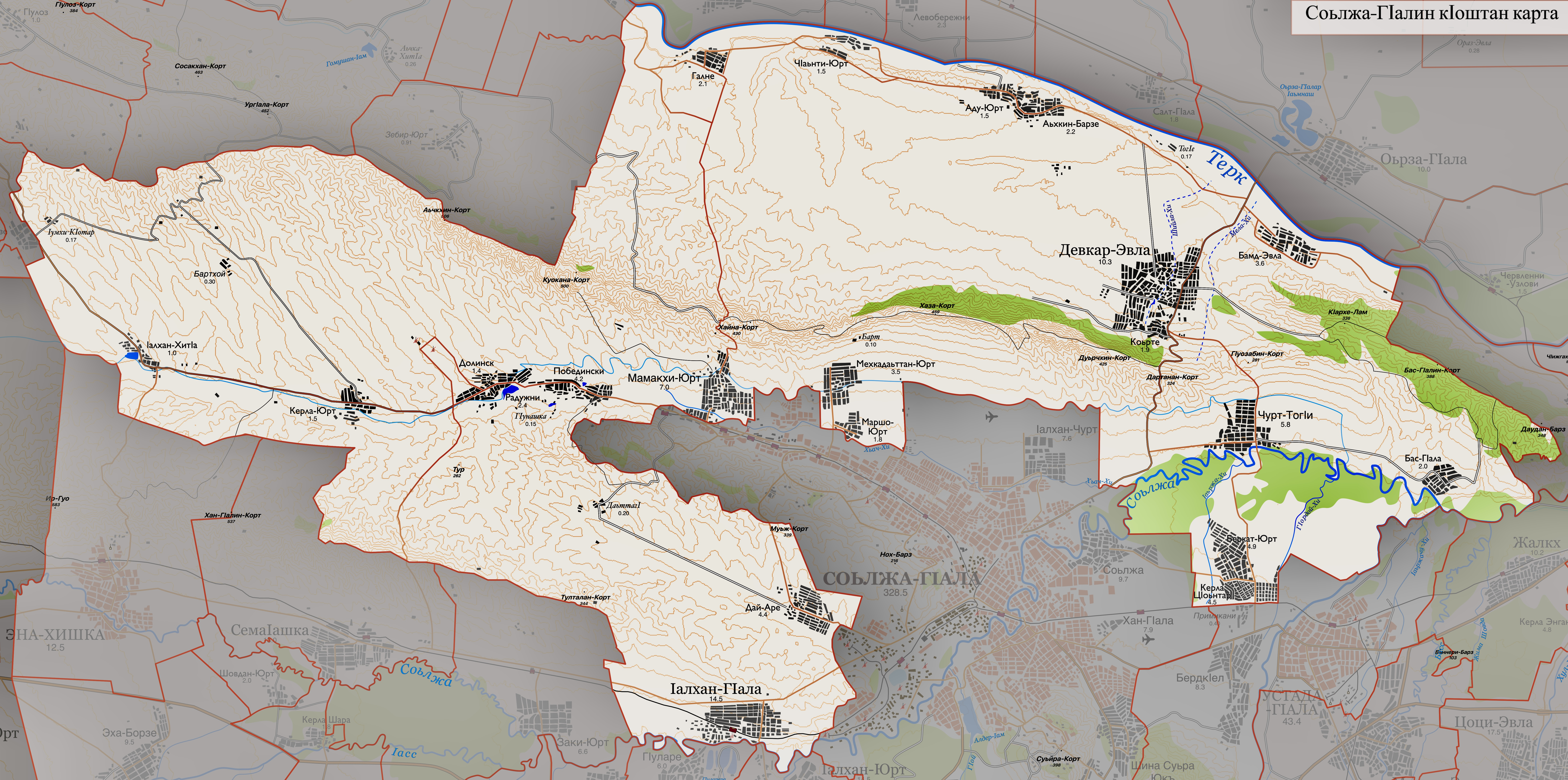
Map of the Grozny district (in Chechen)

Groznensky District (Russian: Гро́зненский райо́н; Chechen: Соьлжа-ГӀалин кӀошт, Sölƶa-Ġalin khoşt) is an administrative and municipal district (raion), one of the fifteen in the Chechen Republic, Russia. It is located in the central and western parts of the republic. The area of the district is 1,600 square kilometers (620 sq mi). The administrative center of the administrative district is the rural locality (a selo) of Tolstoy-Yurt; however, the city of Grozny serves as the administrative center of the municipal district, even though it is incorporated separately from it within the framework of municipal divisions. Population: 118,347 (2010 census); 126,940 (2002 Census); 100,150 (1989 Soviet census).
