= Prigorodny, Astrakhan Oblast =

Prigorodny Пригородный
- Settlement
- Location within Astrakhan Oblast Location within Russia
- Coordinates: 46°22′N 47°59′E
- Country: Russia
- Region: Astrakhan Oblast
- District: Narimanovsky District
- Time zone: UTC+4:00

Prigorodny (Russian: Пригородный) is a rural locality (a settlement) in Solyansky Selsoviet, Narimanovsky District, Astrakhan Oblast, Russia. The population was 833 as of 2010. There are 24 streets.

== Geography ==
Prigorodny is located 38 km south of Narimanov (the district's administrative centre) by road. Solyanka is the nearest rural locality.
