= Prigorodnoye, Amur Oblast =

Prigorodnoye Пригородное
- Selo
- Location within Amur Oblast Location within Russia
- Coordinates: 50°49′N 128°30′E
- Country: Russia
- Region: Amur Oblast
- District: Belogorsky District
- Time zone: UTC+9:00

Prigorodnoye (Russian: Пригородное) is a rural locality (a selo) and the administrative center of Prigorodny Selsoviet of Belogorsky District, Amur Oblast, Russia. The population was 427 as of 2018. There are 9 streets.

== Geography ==
Prigorodnoye is located 15 km south of Belogorsk (the district's administrative centre) by road. Belotserkovka is the nearest rural locality.
