= Prigorodny, Vladimir Oblast =

Prigorodny Пригородный
- Selo
- Location within Vladimir Oblast Location within Russia
- Coordinates: 56°30′N 39°42′E
- Country: Russia
- Region: Vladimir Oblast
- District: Yuryev-Polsky District
- Time zone: UTC+3:00

Prigorodny (Russian: Пригородный) is a rural locality (a selo) in Krasnoselskoye Rural Settlement, Yuryev-Polsky District, Vladimir Oblast, Russia. The population was 414 as of 2010.

== Geography ==
Prigorodny is located 3 km northeast of Yuryev-Polsky (the district's administrative centre) by road. Yuryev-Polsky is the nearest rural locality.
