= Prigorodny, Biysky District, Altai Krai =

Prigorodny Пригородный
- Settlement
- Location within Altai Krai Location within Russia
- Coordinates: 52°34′N 85°14′E
- Country: Russia
- Region: Altai Krai
- District: Biysky District
- Time zone: UTC+7:00

Prigorodny (Russian: Пригородный) is a rural locality (a settlement) in Malougryonovsky Selsoviet, Biysky District, Altai Krai, Russia. The population was 541 as of 2013. There are 12 streets.

== Geography ==
Prigorodny is located 6 km north of Biysk (the district's administrative centre) by road. Biysk is the nearest rural locality.
