= Prigorodnoye, Altai Krai =

Prigorodnoye Пригородное
- Selo
- Location within Altai Krai Location within Russia
- Coordinates: 53°00′N 78°41′E
- Country: Russia
- Region: Altai Krai
- District: Slavgorod
- Time zone: UTC+7:00

Prigorodnoye (Russian: Пригородное) is a rural locality (a selo) in Slavgorod, Altai Krai, Russia. The population was 524 as of 2013. There are 4 streets.
