= Levan Makashvili =

Georgian mixed martial arts fighter

- Born: Levan Makashvili; January 7, 1989 (age 37); Gori, Georgia
- Other names: The Hornet
- Nationality: American; Georgian
- Height: 5 ft 8 in (1.73 m)
- Weight: 155 lb (70 kg; 11 st 1 lb)
- Division: Lightweight
- Reach: 68.5 in (174 cm)
- Stance: Orthodox
- Fighting out of: Oceanside, New York, United States
- Team: Team Mutant
- Rank: Purple belt in Brazilian Jiu-Jitsu
- Years active: 2013–present

Mixed martial arts record
- Total: 33
- Wins: 22
- By knockout: 8
- By submission: 2
- By decision: 12
- Losses: 10
- By knockout: 2
- By submission: 1
- By decision: 7
- Draws: 1

Other information
- Mixed martial arts record from Sherdog
- Last updated on: November 16, 2020

Levan Makashvili (Georgian: ლევან მაყაშვილი; born January 7, 1989) is a Georgian-American mixed martial artist currently competing in the Lightweight division of Absolute Championship Akhmat. A professional competitor since 2013, he has also competed for the UFC, Fight Nights Global and CES MMA. He is ranked #10 in the ACA featherweight rankings.

== Background ==
Born and raised in the central Georgian town of Gori, Makashvili competed in wrestling before moving to the United States in 2013 in an attempt to enhance his mixed martial arts career.

== Mixed martial arts career ==
Makashvili made his professional debut in September 2011 and amassed a record of 10–1 before signing with the Ultimate Fighting Championship in February 2015.

=== Ultimate Fighting Championship ===
Makashvili was expected to make his promotional debut against Nik Lentz on February 14, 2015, at UFC Fight Night 60. However, the pairing was scrapped just prior to the weigh-ins as Lentz was stricken with flu-like symptoms.

Makashvili eventually made his debut on May 16, 2015, as he faced Mark Eddiva at UFC Fight Night 66. He won the fight via split decision.

Makashvili faced Hacran Dias on June 27, 2015, at UFC Fight Night 70, filling in as a short notice replacement for Chas Skelly. He lost the fight via split decision.

Makashvili faced Damon Jackson on January 30, 2016, at UFC on Fox 18. The bout was ruled a majority draw (28-28, 28-28, 29-27) after Makashvili was deducted one point in the third round due to an illegal knee and eye poke.

=== Fight Nights Global ===
Makashvili faced Rasul Mirzaev on 16 November 2016 at Fight Nights Global 54. He won the fight via unanimous decision.

Makashvili next faced Jack McGann at Fight Nights Global 62: Matmuratov vs. Kurzanov on March 31, 2017. He won the fight via unanimous decision.

=== Absolute Championship Akhmat ===
After two bouts in FNG, Makashvili signed with Absolute Championship Akhmat after a two and a half year hiatus. He made his promotional debut against Attila Korkmaz at ACA 101: Strus vs. Nemchinov on November 15, 2019. He won the fight via unanimous decision.

His sophomore bout was against Magomedrasul Khasbulaev at ACA 104: Goncharov vs. Vakhaev on February 21, 2020. He lost the fight via unanimous decision.

He then faced Roman Dik at ACA 109: Strus vs. Haratyk on August 20, 2020. He won the fight via second-round knockout.

Next he faced Aurel Pirtea at ACA 114: Omielańczuk vs. Johnson on November 26, 2020. He lost the fight via split decision.

Makashvili faced Elismar Lima da Silva on April 23, 2021, at ACA 122. He won the bout via unanimous decision.

Makashvili faced Herdeson Batista at November 18, 2021, at ACA 132: Johnson vs. Vakhaev. He lost the bout via unanimous decision.

Makashvili faced Leonardo Limberger on March 6, 2022, at ACA 137. He won the bout via split decision.

Makashvili faced Tural Ragimov on August 13, 2022, at ACA 142. He won the bout via unanimous decision.

Makashvili faced Kurban Taygibov on December 16, 2022, at ACA 149. He lost the bout via unanimous decision.

Makashvili faced Vener Galiev on April 28, 2023 at ACA 156, losing the bout via TKO stoppage in the first round.

Makashvili faced Islam Meshev on December 24, 2023 at ACA 168: Gadzhidaudov vs. Tumenov, losing the bout via unanimous decision.

Makashvili faced Roman Ogulchanskiy on May 17, 2024 at ACA 175: Gordeev vs. Damkovskiy, being submitted in the first round via arm-triangle choke.

== Mixed martial arts record ==
Professional record breakdown
33 matches	22 wins	10 losses
By knockout	8	2
By submission	2	1
By decision	12	7
Draws	1	

Res.	Record	Opponent	Method	Event	Date	Round	Time	Location	Notes
Win	22–10–1	Helio Leal	Submission (north-south choke)	Integra FC 23	April 3, 2026	1	3:45	Tbilisi, Georgia	Won the vacant Integra FC Lightweight Championship.
Win	21–10–1	Dumitru Blindu	TKO (punches)	Integra FC 22	December 6, 2025	1	0:26	Wittlich, Germany	
Loss	20–10–1	Lom-Ali Nalgiev	KO (body kick)	ACA 187	June 6, 2025	1	0:26	Moscow, Russia	Return to Lightweight.
Loss	20–9–1	Roman Ogulchansky	Submission (arm-triangle choke)	ACA 175	May 17, 2024	1	2:34	Moscow, Russia	
Loss	20–8–1	Islam Meshev	Decision (unanimous)	ACA 168	December 24, 2023	3	5:00	Moscow, Russia	
Loss	20–7–1	Vener Galiev	TKO (punches)	ACA 156	April 28, 2023	1	1:39	Moscow, Russia	Lightweight bout.
Loss	20–6–1	Kurban Taygibov	Decision (unanimous)	ACA 149	December 16, 2022	3	5:00	Moscow, Russia	
Win	20–5–1	Tural Ragimov	Decision (unanimous)	ACA 142	August 13, 2022	3	5:00	Kazan, Russia	
Win	19–5–1	Leonardo Limberger	Decision (split)	ACA 137	March 6, 2022	3	5:00	Krasnodar, Russia	Return to Featherweight.
Loss	18–5–1	Herdeson Batista	Decision (unanimous)	ACA 132	November 18, 2021	3	5:00	Minsk, Belarus	
Win	18–4–1	Elismar Lima da Silva	Decision (unanimous)	ACA 122	April 23, 2021	3	5:00	Minsk, Belarus	
Loss	17–4–1	Aurel Pîrtea	Decision (split)	ACA 114	November 26, 2020	3	5:00	Łódź, Poland	Catchweight (158 lb) bout.
Win	17–3–1	Roman Dik	KO (punches)	ACA 109	August 20, 2020	2	4:38	Łódź, Poland	Return to Lightweight.
Loss	16–3–1	Magomedrasul Khasbulaev	Decision (unanimous)	ACA 104	February 21, 2020	3	5:00	Krasnodar, Russia	
Win	16–2–1	Attila Korkmaz	Decision (unanimous)	ACA 101	November 15, 2019	3	5:00	Warsaw, Poland	
Win	15–2–1	Jack McGann	Decision (unanimous)	Fight Nights Global 62	March 31, 2017	3	5:00	Moscow, Russia	
Win	14–2–1	Rasul Mirzaev	Decision (unanimous)	Fight Nights Global 54	November 16, 2016	3	5:00	Rostov-on-Don, Russia	
Win	13–2–1	Sean Soriano	Submission (rear-naked choke)	CES MMA 38	September 23, 2016	2	4:05	Lincoln, Rhode Island, United States	Catchweight (147 lb) bout.
Win	12–2–1	Ryan Sanders	Decision (unanimous)	CES MMA 36	June 10, 2016	3	5:00	Lincoln, Rhode Island, United States	Lightweight bout.
Draw	11–2–1	Damon Jackson	Draw (majority)	UFC on Fox: Johnson vs. Bader	January 30, 2016	3	5:00	Newark, New Jersey, United States	Makashvili was deducted one point in round 3 due to an illegal knee and eye poke.
Loss	11–2	Hacran Dias	Decision (split)	UFC Fight Night: Machida vs. Romero	June 27, 2015	3	5:00	Hollywood, Florida, United States	
Win	11–1	Mark Eddiva	Decision (split)	UFC Fight Night: Edgar vs. Faber	May 16, 2015	3	2:08	Pasay, Philippines	
Win	10–1	Alexandre Bezerra	Decision (unanimous)	Cage Fury FC 44	December 13, 2014	5	5:00	Bethlehem, Pennsylvania, United States	Won the Cage Fury FC Featherweight Championship.
Loss	9–1	Alexandre Bezerra	Decision (majority)	Cage Fury FC 38	August 9, 2014	5	5:00	Atlantic City, New Jersey, United States	Lost the Cage Fury FC Featherweight Championship.
Win	9–0	Scott Heckman	TKO (punches)	Cage Fury FC 35	April 26, 2014	4	2:30	Atlantic City, New Jersey, United States	Won the Cage Fury FC Featherweight Championship.
Win	8–0	Jordan Stiner	Decision (unanimous)	Cage Fury FC 32	February 22, 2014	3	5:00	King of Prussia, Pennsylvania, United States	
Win	7–0	Tom English	KO (punch)	Ring of Combat 46	September 20, 2013	2	1:39	Atlantic City, New Jersey, United States	
Win	6–0	Thomas Wash	TKO (punches)	Turf Wars 11	April 13, 2013	1	0:17	Florence, Kentucky, United States	
Win	5–0	Anthony Facchini	Decision (unanimous)	Ring of Combat 44	April 5, 2013	3	4:00	Atlantic City, New Jersey, United States	
Win	4–0	Levan Kveselava	TKO (punches)	GUFF: Determination	November 16, 2012	1	2:05	Gori, Georgia	Return to Featherweight.
Win	3–0	Garik Abriamiani	TKO (punches	GUFF: Batubi Circus	August 6, 2012	3	1:11	Batumi, Georgia	Lightweight debut.
Win	2-0	Giorgi Aptsiauri	Decision (unanimous)	Georgian Universal Fighting Federation	September 22, 2011	3	3:00	Kutaisi, Georgia	
Win	1–0	Giorgi Turashvili	TKO (punches)	Georgian Universal Fighting Federation	September 17, 2011	1	0:51	Gori, Georgia	Featherweight debut.

== Amateur MMA record ==
Professional record breakdown
2 matches	2 wins	0 losses
By knockout	0	0
By submission	0	0
By decision	2	0

Res.	Record	Opponent	Method	Event	Date	Round	Time	Location	Notes
Win	2–0	Lashawn Alcocks	Decision (split)	RDMMA - Battle in the South 4	July 14, 2012	4	3:00	Wilmington, North Carolina, USA	
Win	1–0	Raul Tutarauli	Decision (unanimous)	Georgian Universal Fighting Federation	February 20, 2011	3	5:00	Gori, Georgia	

== See also ==
- List of current ACA fighters
- List of male mixed martial artists
