= Augusto Mendes =

Brazilian BJJ practitioner and mixed martial artist

- Born: Augusto Lopes Mendes; March 3, 1983 (age 43); Rio de Janeiro, Brazil
- Other names: Tanquinho
- Height: 5 ft 6 in (1.68 m)
- Weight: 135 lb (61 kg; 9.6 st)
- Reach: 65 in (165 cm)
- Style: BJJ
- Fighting out of: Glendale, Arizona, United States
- Team: MMA Lab; Soul Fighters MMA (2008–present)
- Teacher: John Crouch
- Rank: Black belt in Brazilian jiu-jitsu under Master Francisco Mansur
- Years active: 2013–2019

Mixed martial arts record
- Total: 9
- Wins: 6
- By knockout: 1
- By submission: 4
- By decision: 1
- Losses: 3
- By knockout: 1
- By decision: 2

Other information
- University: Estácio de Sá Universities
- Mixed martial arts record from Sherdog

Augusto Mendes (born March 3, 1983) is a Brazilian former professional mixed martial artist and Brazilian jiu jitsu practitioner. He was signed to the Absolute Championship Berkut. He was the International Brazilian Jiu-Jitsu Federation Black Belt World (IBJJF World) 70 kg champion (2013), International Brazilian Jiu-Jitsu Federation World Nogi (IBJJF World No-Gi) 73.5 kg champion in 2012 and 2015 and UAEJJF Abu Dhabi World Pro Champion in 2011 and 2013.

== Background ==
Mendes was born in Rio de Janeiro, Brazil. He started training Brazilian jiu jitsu (BJJ) in 1997 in Kioto gym in Tijuca when he was introduced by his brother, Bruno Tank who was a BJJ protectionist. He trained under Alvaro and Krauss Monsor who was the student of 9th degree black belt master Francisco Mansor. At fourteen, training three times a day, he competed four months later, winning a bronze medal in the Rio State Championships and in the same year he took home the silver medal in the Brazilian Championship. He started teaching BJJ two years later and continue to win many regional, international and world medals, notably IBJJF World 70 kg champion in 2013, IBJJF World No-Gi 73.5 kg champion in 2012 and 2015 and UAEJJF Abu Dhabi World Pro Champion (in 2011 and 2013.

Medes and his brother Bruno Mendes open their BJJ gym, Renovacao BJJ, in 2005 and started transitioned to MMA training. Two years later, together with Rafael Barbosa, Leandro Escobar and his brother Bruno Mendes they founded Soul Fighters gym in 2008.

== Mixed martial arts career ==
=== Early career ===
Mendes started his professional mixed martial arts career in April 2014 after just one win in an amateur fight. He went to secure a 5 fight winning streak and was signed by UFC one year later in 2015.

=== Ultimate Fighting Championship ===
Mendes made his debut with 5 day short notice, replacing injured John Lineker, at UFC on February 21, 2016, at UFC Fight Night: Cowboy vs. Cowboy against Cody Garbrandt. he was knocked out and lost the fight in round one.

Mendes's second fight in UFC was set one year later on January 15, 2017, after an ACL surgery, at UFC Fight Night: Rodríguez vs. Penn against Frankie Saenz. He won the fight via split decision with the scoreboard of (28-29, 29–28, 29–28). This win earned him Fight of the Night award.

On April 15, 2017, Mendes face Aljamain Sterling at UFC on Fox: Johnson vs Reis. After three rounds fight, he lost the fight via unanimous decision.

Mendes was expected to face Boston Salmon on October 28, 2017, at UFC Fight Night: Brunson vs. Machida. However, Mendes pulled out of the fight on October 3, citing leg injury. He was replaced a week later by promotional newcomer Raoni Barcelos.

Mendes was expected to face Merab Dvalishvili on April 21, 2018, at UFC Fight Night 128. However, he was pulled from the fight after he was notified of a potential USADA violation.

On June 8, 2018, it was reported that Mendes who had one fight with UFC, was granted release after USADA suspension, and joined Absolute Championship Berkut (ACB).

=== Post-UFC career ===
In his promotional debut Mendes faced Ivan Zhirkov at ACA 96: Goncharov vs. Johnson on June 8, 2019. He lost the fight via split decision.

== Jiu Jitsu career ==
Mendes competed in Absolute Championship Berkut 6: Jiu Jitsu no-gi (145 Ibs) grand prix tournament on July 16, 2017, in Moscow.Competitors in the division included Paulo Miyao, Leo Vieira, Isaque Paiva, Osvaldo Moizinho, Kim Terra, Gabriel Marangoni and Rafael Mansur. He defeated Rafael Mansur on quarterfinal and lost to Paulo Miyao in the semi-final.

Mendes competed in Absolute Championship Berkut 9: Jiu Jitsu no-gi 60 kg Grand Prix tournament on December 9, 2017, in Moscow. He won the tournament after submitted Milton Bastos via a kimura under twenty seconds in the quarterfinal round and he proceeded to semifinal round where he won the fight against Joao Miyao, a world champion. He took on Samir Chantre at the final and won via a guillotine in the fifth round.

== Personal life ==
Mendes's moniker "Tanquinho" means "Little Tank" in Portuguese which was coined after his older brother, Bruno Mendes' moniker "Tank".

Prior relocating to United States, Mendes taught BJJ at Tijuca Tenis Club as the head instructor.

Mendes is a certified referee by Confederação Brasileira de Jiu-Jitsu (CBJJ).

Mendes earned a degree in physical education at the University Estacio de Sá

Mendes has opened and operates a Brazilian Jiu-Jitsu Gym in Tempe, Arizona called the AT Academy.

== Championships and achievements ==
=== Mixed martial arts ===
- Ultimate Fighting Championship
  - Fight of the Night (One time) vs. Frankie Saenz

=== Jiu Jitsu ===
  - IBJJF World Champion (2013)
  - IBJJF World No-Gi Champion (2012 and 2015)
  - UAEJJF Abu Dhabi World Pro Champion (2011 and 2013)
  - CBJJ/IBJJF South American Champion (2010)
  - UAEJJF Abu Dhabi World Pro Champion (2011 and 2013)
  - CBJJ/IBJJF South American Champion (2010)
  - USBJJF/IBJJF American National Champion (2012)
  - CBJJ Brazilian National Teams Champion (2008, 2009 and 2010)
  - Copa Podio “Couples Challenge” Superfight Winner (2013)
  - World Expo Superfight Winner (2014)
  - FJJR Rio State Champion (2008–2010)
  - IBJJF Rio International Open Champion (2009 and 2010)
  - IBJJF Las Vegas International Open Champion (2012)
  - IBJJF European Open Runner-up (2013)
  - IBJJF New York International Open Runner-up (2010)
  - IBJJF Pan American Championship 3rd Place (2009, 2011 and 2013)
  - CBJJ Brazilian National Championship 3rd Place (2005, 2008, 2010 and 2011)
- No-Gi Absolute Championship Berkut Jiu Jitsu
  - 2017 No Gi Absolute Championship Berkut Jiu Jitsu 60 kg champion

=== ADCC ===
Male 66 kg ADCC 2019 Champion (2019)

== Mixed martial arts record ==
Professional record breakdown
9 matches	6 wins	3 losses
By knockout	1	1
By submission	3	0
By decision	2	2

Res.	Record	Opponent	Method	Event	Date	Round	Time	Location	Notes
Loss	6–3	Igor Zhirkov	Decision (split)	ACA 96: Goncharov vs. Johnson	June 8, 2019	3	5:00	Łódź, Poland	
Loss	6–2	Aljamain Sterling	Decision (unanimous)	UFC on Fox: Johnson vs. Reis	April 21, 2017	3	5:00	Kansas City, Missouri United States	
Win	6–1	Frankie Saenz	Decision (split)	UFC Fight Night: Rodríguez vs. Penn	January 15, 2017	3	5:00	Phoenix, Arizona, United States	Fight of the Night.
Loss	5–1	Cody Garbrandt	KO (punches)	UFC Fight Night: Cowboy vs. Cowboy	February 21, 2016	1	4:18	Pittsburgh, Pennsylvania, United States	
Win	5–0	Donald Williams	Submission (triangle choke)	LFC 43	June 2, 2015	1	0:53	Burbank, California, United States	
Win	4–0	Evan Martinez	TKO (elbows)	LFC 38	February 5, 2015	1	1:35	Ontario, California, United States	
Win	3–0	Richard Delfin	Decision (unanimous)	King of the Cage: Sinister Intentions	October 17, 2015	3	5:00	Las Vegas, Nevada, United States	
Win	2–0	Omar Castro	Submission (armbar)	DFD 9	April 3, 2015	2	3:19	Rancho Mirage, California, United States	
Win	1–0	Xavier Ramirez	Submission (armbar)	King of the Cage: Fisticuffs	December 4, 2014	1	3:23	Highland, California, United States	

== Grappling record ==
Rec.	Result	Opponent	Method	Event	Division	Stage	Gi	Year
Loss	58-26-1	Paulo Miyao	Points (4-0)	ACB JJ 10: Panza vs. Rocha[	65 kg	4F		2018
Win	58-25-1	Samir Chantre	Arm in guillotine	ACB JJ 9	60 kg	F		2017
Win	57-25-1	Joao Miyao	Points	ACB JJ 9	60 kg	SF		2017
Win	56-25-1	Milton Bastos	Kimura	ACB JJ 9	60 kg	4F		2017
Loss	55-25-1	Pablo Mantovani	Referee Decision	ADCC	60 kg	4F		2017
Win	55-24-1	Yuta Shimada	Pts: 4x0	ADCC	66 kg	E1		2017
Loss	54-24-1	Paulo Miyao	Points	ACBJJ 6	66 kg	SF		2017
Win	54-23-1	Rafael Mansur	Points	ACBJJ 6	65 kg	4F		2017
Win	53-23-1	Jeff Glover	Referee Decision	F2W 25	65 kg	SPF		2017
Loss	52-23-1	Yuri Simoes	Referee Decision	NoGi Worlds	ABS	SF		2016
Win	52-22-1	Muslim Patsarigov	Pts: 0x0, Adv	NoGi Worlds	ABS	4F	No Gi	2016
Win	51-22-1	Nic Ruben	Pts: 5x0	NoGi Worlds	ABS	8F	No Gi	2016
Loss	50-22-1	Rodrigo Freitas	Pts: 0x0, Adv	NoGi Worlds	73 kg	4F	No Gi	2016
Win	50-21-1	Ross Nicholls	Katagatame	NoGi Worlds	73 kg	R2	No Gi	2016
Draw	49-21-1	Eddie Cummings	---	Polaris 3	70 kg	SPF		2016
Win	49-21	AJ Agazarm	Referee Decision	Berkut 2	ABS	SPF		2015
Win	48-21	Gianni Grippo	Pts: 2x0	NoGi Worlds	70 kg	F	No Gi	2015
Win	47-21	Gianni Grippo	Pts: 2x0	NoGi Worlds	70 kg	SF	No Gi	2015
Win	46-21	Vitor Paschoal	Katagatame	NoGi Worlds	70 kg	4F	No Gi	2015
Win	45-21	Matthew Magana	RNC	NoGi Worlds	70 kg	8F	No Gi	2015
Win	44-21	Geo Martinez	Toe hold	ADCC	66 kg	3RD		2015
Loss	43-21	Rubens Charles	Referee Decision	ADCC	66 kg	SF		2015
Win	43-20	Eddie Cummings	Pen	ADCC	66 kg	4F		2015
Win	42-20	Nicholas Renier	Pts: 3x0	ADCC	66 kg	R1		2015
Win	41-20	Rafael Domingos	Pts: 2x0	Fight Blok Pro	79 kg	SPF		2014
Win	40-20	Gianni Grippo	Referee Decision	World Expo	ADCC	SPF		2014
Loss	39-20	Justin Rader	Referee Decision	ADCC	66 kg	R1		2013
Win	39-19	Rafael Mendes	Pts: 2x2, Adv	World Champ.	70 kg	F		2013
Win	38-19	Rafael Mendes	Pts: 2x0	World Champ.	70 kg	SF		2013
Win	37-19	Eduardo Ramos	Points	World Champ.	70 kg	4F		2013
Win	36-19	Rubens Charles	Pts: 2x0	World Pro	70 kg	F		2013
Win	35-19	Michel Maia	Pts: 2x0	World Pro	70 kg	SF		2013
Loss	34-19	Rubens Charles	Points	Pan American	70 kg	SF		2013
Win	34-18	Isaque Oliveira	Points	Pan American	70 kg	4F		2013
Win	33-18	Spenser Guilliam	Pts: 15x0	Pan American	70 kg	R1		2013
Win	32-18	Marcel Gonclaves	Points	NYC World Trials	74 kg	F		2013
Win	31-18	Renan Borges	Armbar	NYC World Trials	74 kg	SF		2013
Loss	30-18	Rubens Charles	Pts: 2x0	European Open	70 kg	F		2013
Win	30-17	Ed Ramos	N/A	European Open	70 kg	SF		2013
Win	29-17	Masahiro Iwasaki	Armbar	European Open	70 kg	4F		2013
Loss	28-17	Leandro Lo	Pts: 5x2	Copa Podio	ABS	SPF		2013
Loss	28-16	Leandro Lo	Points	Arizona Open	ABS	F		2013
Win	28-15	JT Torres	Pts: 0x0, Adv	NoGi Worlds	76 kg	F	No Gi	2012
Win	27-15	Leandro Lo	Pts: 9x0	NoGi Worlds	76 kg	SF	No Gi	2012
Win	26-15	Della Monica	Adv	Las Vegas Open	76 kg	F		2012
Win	25-15	Steve Rosenburg	Ezekiel	Las Vegas Open	76 kg	SF		2012
Loss	24-15	Tanner Rice	Pts: 4x0	IBJJF Pro League	82 kg	4F		2012
Win	24-14	Rodrigo Farias	Arm in Ezekiel	American Nat.	76 kg	F		2012
Loss	23-14	Lucas Lepri	Adv	No Gi Worlds	76 kg	F	No Gi	2011
Win	23-13	Della Monica	Pts: 5x0	No Gi Worlds	76 kg	SF	No Gi	2011
Win	22-13	Thomas Michael	Armbar	No Gi Worlds	76 kg	4F	No Gi	2011
Loss	21-13	Claudio Calasans	Adv	ADCC	77 kg	4F		2011
Win	21-12	Vagner Rocha	Footlock	ADCC	77 kg	R1		2011
Loss	20-12	Rafael Mendes	Pts: 4x4, Adv	World Champ.	70 kg	F		2011
Win	20-11	Rubens Charles	Pts: 4x2	World Champ.	70 kg	SF		2011
Win	19-11	Bruno Frazatto	Pen	World Champ.	70 kg	4F		2011
Win	18-11	Ryan Hall	Choke from back	World Champ.	70 kg	RDS		2011
Loss	17-11	Leandro Lo	Points	Brasileiro	76 kg	SF		2011
Loss	17-10	Davi Ramos	Points	World P. NoGi	74 kg	R1	No Gi	2011
Win	17-9	Rafael Mendes	Referee Decision	World Pro.	65 kg	F		2011
Win	16-9	Eduardo Ramos	Adv	World Pro.	65 kg	SF		2011
Win	15-9	Guilherme Mendes	Adv	World Pro.	65 kg	4F		2011
Win	14-9	Ryan Hall	Pts: 3x2	World Pro.	65 kg	8F		2011
Win	13-9	Ary Farias	Pts: 4x2	World Pro.	65 kg	R1		2011
Loss	12-9	Lucas Lepri	Pts: 4x2	Pan American	76 kg	SF		2011
Win	12-8	Rodrigo Caporal	DQ	Pan American	76 kg	4F		2011
Win	11-8	Leandro Lo	Pts: 4x0	Pan American	76 kg	R1		2011
Win	10-8	Guilherme Mendes	Pts: 9x0	Team Nationals	68 kg	F		2010
Win	9-8	Mario Reis	DQ	South American	ABS	F		2010
Win	8-8	Nivaldo Oliveira	Pts: 4x2	South American	ABS	SF		2010
Win	7-8	Mario Reis	Pts: 0x0, Adv	South American	76 kg	F		2010
Win	6-8	Davi Ramos	DQ	South American	76 kg	SF		2010
Loss	5-8	Lucas Lepri	Adv	World Champ.	76 kg	4F		2010
Loss	5-7	Lucas Lepri	RNC	No Gi Worlds	76 kg	F	No Gi	2010
Win	5-6	JT Torres	Points	No Gi Worlds	76 kg	SF	No Gi	2010
Win	4-6	Unknown	Pts: 18x0	WPC Lx Trials	74 kg	F		2010
Win	3-6	Unknown	Cross choke	WPC Lx Trials	74 kg	SF		2010
Win	2-6	Unknown	Armbar	WPC Lx Trials	74 kg	4F		2010
Loss	1-6	Michael Langhi	Pts: 4x4, Adv	World Champ.	76 kg	4F		2009
Loss	1-5	Claudio Calasans	Points	ADCC Trials	77 kg	4F		2009
Loss	1-4	Michael Langhi	Armbar	Pan American	76 kg	SF		2009
Win	1-3	Unknown	Armbar	Pan American	76 kg	4F		2009
Loss	0-3	Bruno Frazatto	Points	World Champ.	70 kg	4F		2008
Loss	0-2	Rubens Charles	Choke from back	World Champ.	70 kg	4F		2007
Loss	0-1	Reinaldo Ribeiro	Pts. 2x2, Adv	World Champ.	70 kg	4F		2006

== See also ==
- List of current UFC fighters
- List of male mixed martial artists
- World Jiu-Jitsu Championship
- World Nogi Brazilian Jiu-Jitsu Championship
