= Murad Zeinulabidov =

Russian mixed martial arts fighter

- Born: Мурад Зейнулабидов; October 24, 1990 (age 35); Dagestan, Russia
- Nationality: Russian
- Height: 5 ft 7 in (1.70 m)
- Weight: 125 lb (57 kg; 8 st 13 lb)
- Division: Flyweight
- Fighting out of: Makhachkala, Russia
- Team: DagFighter
- Years active: 2011–present

Mixed martial arts record
- Total: 25
- Wins: 21
- By knockout: 5
- By submission: 12
- By decision: 4
- Losses: 4
- By submission: 2
- By decision: 2

Other information
- Mixed martial arts record from Sherdog

Murad Zeinulabidov (Russian: Мурад Зейнулабидов) (born October 24, 1990) is a Russian mixed martial artist who competes in the Flyweight division of the ACA. From January 2021 to October 2021, Fight Matrix had him ranked as the #9 flyweight in the world.

== Mixed martial arts career ==
=== Early career ===
Starting his career in 2011, Murad compiled an 18–3 record fighting in a variety of regional Russian promotions, such as ACA and Fight Nights Global. Murad also participated as part of a cultural program organized with the participation of folklore groups from Russia and Portugal. This event was supported by the Federal Agency "Rossotrudnichestvo", which takes part in organizing and holding events of a sports and cultural nature. He won the bout against Hicham Rachid via first-minute anaconda choke, for which he was awarded a letter of gratitude from the Ministry of Foreign Affairs of Russia for his participation in measures to strengthen friendly relations between the two countries.

=== Absolute Championship Akhmat ===
Murad returned to ACA on January 26, 2019 at ACA 91: Agujev vs. Silvério against Ruslan Abiltarov. He won the bout via first round knockout.

Murad faced Rasul Albaskhanov on January 26, 2019 at ACA 104: Goncharov vs. Vakhaev. He won the bout via 2nd round submission.

Murad faced Maycon Silvan on November 6, 2020 at ACA 113: Kerefov vs. Gadzhiev. He won the bout via unanimous decision.

== Mixed martial arts record ==
Professional record breakdown
25 matches	21 wins	4 losses
By knockout	5	0
By submission	12	2
By decision	4	2

Res.	Record	Opponent	Method	Event	Date	Round	Time	Location	Notes
Loss	21–4	Saygid Abdulaev	Decision (unanimous)	ACA 193	October 4, 2025	3	5:00	Grozny, Russia	
Win	21–3	Maycon Silvan	Decision (unanimous)	ACA 113	November 6, 2020	3	5:00	Moscow, Russia	
Win	20–3	Rasul Albaskhanov	Submission (arm-triangle choke)	ACA 104	February 21, 2020	2	3:48	Krasnodar, Russia	
Win	19–3	Ruslan Abiltarov	KO (punches)	ACA 91	January 26, 2019	1	1:13	Grozny, Russia	
Win	18–3	Pedro Nobre	Decision (unanimous)	WFCA 51	August 23, 2018	3	5:00	Ulyanovsk, Russia	
Loss	17–3	Azam Gaforov	Decision (unanimous)	WFCA 45	February 24, 2018	3	5:00	Grozny, Russia	
Win	17–2	Dias Yerengaipov	Submission (rear-naked choke)	Akhmat Fight Show 35	April 1, 2017	1	3:25	Astana, Kazakhstan	Return to Flyweight.
Win	16–2	Wu Ze	Submission (brabo choke)	WLF E.P.I.C. 7	August 20, 2016	1	2:20	Zhengzhou, China	
Win	15–2	Hicham Rachid	Submission (anaconda choke)	Showfight 32	May 16, 2016	1	0:58	Estoril, Portugal	Return to Bantamweight.
Win	14–2	Shamil Shakhbulatov	Submission (triangle choke)	MMA Cup Moscow: Big Final	November 28, 2015	1	0:56	Moscow, Russia	Flyweight debut.
Win	13–2	Alexey Naumov	Submission (guillotine choke)	Fight Nights Global 42	October 23, 2015	1	1:50	Saint Petersburg, Russia	Catchweight (130 lb) bout.
Win	12–2	Eldar Tolagatov	TKO (punches)	Pankration Cup of Teberda 2015	April 12, 2015	2	1:05	Teberda, Russia	
Loss	11–2	Filip Macek	Submission (rear-naked choke)	ACB 14	February 28, 2015	3	0:55	Grozny, Russia	2015 ACB Bantamweight Grand Prix Quarterfinal.
Win	11–1	Aleksandr Lunga	Decision (unanimous)	New Stream: Russia vs. The World	October 31, 2014	2	5:00	Moscow, Russia	
Win	10–1	Hasan Atagayev	Submission (rear-naked choke)	Sochi FC: Malibu Cup 2014	August 28, 2014	1	2:22	Sochi, Russia	
Win	9–1	Mika Hamalainen	Submission (triangle armbar)	Fight Night Finland: Helsinki Fight Night	June 14, 2014	1	4:07	Helsinki, Finland	
Win	8–1	Ibragim Mazhiev	Submission (rear-naked choke)	ACB 4	March 30, 2014	1	4:11	Grozny, Russia	
Loss	7–1	Sergej Grecicho	Submission (rear-naked choke)	Oplot Challenge 86	November 2, 2013	2	3:41	Kharkov, Ukraine	Return to Bantamweight.
Win	7–0	Maksim Marchenko	TKO (punches)	Tech-Krep FC: Battle of Stars 2	June 16, 2013	1	2:00	Makhachkala, Russia	Featherweight debut.
Win	6–0	Vagiz Ismagilov	Submission (triangle choke)	ProFC 48	April 24, 2013	1	2:00	Sterlitamak, Russia	
Win	5–0	Aidarbek Kabylov	Decision (Unanimous)	Pride of Caucasus 2012	September 23, 2012	1	2:00	Khasavyurt, Russia	
Win	4–0	Yuri Svincov	TKO (punches)	Derbent FC 3	July 13, 2012	1	0:49	Magaramkent, Russia	
Win	3–0	Asker Baragunov	Submission (choke)	World Boxing Organisation: Pirog vs. Ishida	May 1, 2012	2	0:41	Moscow, Russia	
Win	2–0	Aleksandr Lunga	KO (punch)	World MMA Federation: WMAC 2011 Finals	October 9, 2011	1	0:24	Yalta, Ukraine	
Win	1–0	Vartan Asatryan	Submission (triangle choke)	World MMA Federation: WMAC 2011 Semifinals	October 8, 2011	1	0:00	Yalta, Ukraine	Bantamweight debut.

== See also ==
- List of current ACA fighters
- List of male mixed martial artists
