= Hacran Dias =

Brazilian martial artist

- Born: 16 May 1984 (age 42); Favela Santo Amaro, Catete, Rio de Janeiro, Brazil (Note: Favela Santo Amaro (which is the favela where he was born and raised) is a favela located in the Catete neighborhood, South Zone of Rio de Janeiro (Note: the Catete neighborhood is well known for being the place where the old Presidential Palace, the Catete Palace, is located, which was the former residence of the President of Brazil at the time that Rio de Janeiro was the capital of Brazil).)
- Other names: Barnabé
- Height: 5 ft 8 in (1.73 m)
- Weight: 160 lb (73 kg; 11 st 6 lb)
- Division: Featherweight; Lightweight
- Reach: 69 in (180 cm)
- Stance: Southpaw
- Fighting out of: Rio de Janeiro, Brazil
- Team: Nova União
- Rank: Black belt in Brazilian Jiu-Jitsu

Mixed martial arts record
- Total: 43
- Wins: 29
- By knockout: 3
- By submission: 11
- By decision: 15
- Losses: 13
- By knockout: 2
- By decision: 11
- Draws: 1

Other information
- Mixed martial arts record from Sherdog

Hacran Dias (born 16 May 1984) is a Brazilian mixed martial artist who formerly competed in the featherweight division of the Ultimate Fighting Championship. In 2015, Dias was the #9 featherweight in the world by Sherdog.

== Mixed martial arts career ==
=== Background and training ===
Hacran Dias is a part of the Nova Uniao fight team. Over his career Dias has fought in the lightweight division primarily in Shooto Brazil and M-1 Challenge. During this span, Dias amassed a record of 20 wins, one loss, and one draw. Noted primarily for his methodical approach to grappling, Dias also trains with noted fighters José Aldo, Renan Barão and Marlon Sandro.

=== The Ultimate Fighter: Brazil ===
In January 2012 it was revealed Dias was one of 300 first-stage applicants for The Ultimate Fighter: Brazil.

=== Ultimate Fighting Championship ===
In April, it was announced that Dias had skipped over the show and signed a three-fight deal with the UFC.

In his UFC debut, Dias faced Iuri Alcântara on 23 June 2012 at UFC 147 and won the fight via unanimous decision.

Dias was expected to face Chad Mendes on 15 December 2012 at UFC on FX 6. However just days before the event, Dias pulled out of the bout citing a shoulder injury and was replaced by promotional newcomer Yaotzin Meza.

Dias was expected to face Manvel Gamburyan on 18 May 2013 at UFC on FX 8. However, Gamburyan was forced to pull out of the bout citing another injury and was replaced by Nik Lentz Dias lost the back-and-forth fight via unanimous decision.

Dias was expected to face Rodrigo Damm on 9 October 2013 at UFC Fight Night 29. However, the bout was scrapped just days prior to the event after Damm was sidelined due to a kidney stone attack.

Dias was expected to face Tatsuya Kawajiri on 4 January 2014 at UFC Fight Night 34. However, Dias pulled out of the bout citing an injury.

After over a year away from the sport, Dias returned to face Ricardo Lamas on 28 June 2014 at UFC Fight Night 44. He lost the fight via unanimous decision.

Dias faced Darren Elkins on 20 December 2014 at UFC Fight Night 58. Dias won the fight by unanimous decision.

Dias was expected to face Chas Skelly on 27 June 2015 at UFC Fight Night 70. However, Skelly was pulled from the card due to illness and replaced by Levan Makashvili. Dias won the fight via split decision.

Dias next faced Cub Swanson on 16 April 2016 at UFC on Fox 19. Dias lost the fight via unanimous decision.

Dias was expected to face Brian Ortega on 1 October 2016 at UFC Fight Night 96. However, Ortega pulled out of the fight in early September and was replaced by Andre Fili. He lost the fight via unanimous decision.

Dias faced Jared Gordon in the Lightweight bout on 28 October 2017 at UFC Fight Night: Brunson vs. Machida. He lost the fight via unanimous decision.

Dias was released from the UFC on 15 November 2017.

=== Shooto Brazil ===
After being released in late 2017, Dias faced to headline Shooto Brazil 84 against Mauricio Machado on 26 May 2018. He won the bout via first round armbar.

=== Absolute Championship Akhmat ===
Dias made his promotion debut for Absolute Championship Akhmat against Ustarmagomed Gadzhidaudov on 16 March 2019 at ACA 93: Balaev vs Zhamaldaev. He won the bout via unanimous.

Dias faced Amirkhan Adaev on 9 April 2021 at ACA 121: Dipchikov vs. Gasanov. He won via unanimous decision.

Dias faced Abdul-Aziz Abdulvakhabov for the ACA Lightweight Championship on 5 November 2021 at ACA 131: Abdulvakhabov vs. Dias. He lost the close bout via split decision.

Dias faced Yusuf Raisov in the Quarter-finals of the ACA Lightweight Grand Prix at ACA 138 on 27 March 2022. He lost the bout via unanimous decision.

Dias faced Aurel Pîrtea on 16 December 2022, at ACA 149. He won the bout via unanimous decision.

Dias faced Mukhamed Kokov for the Interim ACA Lightweight Championship on 17 March 2023 at ACA 154: Vakhaev vs Goncharov, winning the bout and belt via unanimous decision.

Dias faced Daud Shaikhaev at ACA 164 on 4 October 2023, losing the bout via uanimous decision.

Dias faced Vener Galiev on 8 December 2023 at ACA 167: Baidulaev vs. Dias, getting finished by TKO stoppage for the first time in his career.

== Mixed martial arts record ==
Professional record breakdown
43 matches	29 wins	13 losses
By knockout	3	2
By submission	11	0
By decision	15	11
Draws	1	

Res.	Record	Opponent	Method	Event	Date	Round	Time	Location	Notes
Win	29–13–1	Ibragim Kantaev	Technical Submission (rear-naked choke)	ACA 207	12 September 2026	1	4:32	Krasnodar, Russia	Welterweight debut.
Loss	28–13–1	Ali Suleymanov	Decision (unanimous)	ACA 196	23 November 2025	3	5:00	Minsk, Belarus	
Win	28–12–1	Marat Balaev	Decision (unanimous)	ACA 186	10 May 2025	3	5:00	Saint Petersburg, Russia	
Loss	27–12–1	Abdul-Rakhman Temirov	TKO (punches)	ACA 179	8 September 2024	2	1:19	Krasnodar, Russia	
Loss	27–11–1	Vener Galiev	TKO (punches)	ACA 167	8 December 2023	1	1:20	Ufa, Russia	
Loss	27–10–1	Daud Shaikhaev	Decision (unanimous)	ACA 164	4 October 2023	3	5:00	Grozny, Russia	
Loss	27–9–1	Mukhamed Kokov	Decision (unanimous)	ACA 154	17 March 2023	5	5:00	Krasnodar, Russia	For the interim ACA Lightweight Championship.
Win	27–8–1	Aurel Pîrtea	Decision (unanimous)	ACA 149	16 December 2022	3	5:00	Moscow, Russia	
Loss	26–8–1	Yusuf Raisov	Decision (unanimous)	ACA 138	27 March 2022	5	5:00	Grozny, Russia	2022 ACA Lightweight Grand Prix Quarterfinal.
Loss	26–7–1	Abdul-Aziz Abdulvakhabov	Decision (split)	ACA 131	5 November 2021	5	5:00	Moscow, Russia	For the ACA Lightweight Championship.
Win	26–6–1	Amirkhan Adaev	Decision (unanimous)	ACA 121	9 April 2021	3	5:00	Minsk, Belarus	
Win	25–6–1	Ustarmagomed Gadzhidaudov	Decision (unanimous)	ACA 93	16 March 2019	3	5:00	Saint Petersburg, Russia	
Win	24–6–1	Mauricio Machado	Submission (armbar)	Shooto Brazil 84	26 May 2018	1	3:58	Rio de Janeiro, Brazil	
Loss	23–6–1	Jared Gordon	Decision (unanimous)	UFC Fight Night: Brunson vs. Machida	28 October 2017	3	5:00	São Paulo, Brazil	Return to Lightweight.
Loss	23–5–1	Andre Fili	Decision (unanimous)	UFC Fight Night: Lineker vs. Dodson	1 October 2016	3	5:00	Portland, Oregon, United States	Catchweight (148.5 lbs) bout; Dias missed weight.
Loss	23–4–1	Cub Swanson	Decision (unanimous)	UFC on Fox: Teixeira vs. Evans	16 April 2016	3	5:00	Tampa, Florida, United States	
Win	23–3–1	Levan Makashvili	Decision (split)	UFC Fight Night: Machida vs. Romero	27 June 2015	3	5:00	Hollywood, Florida, United States	
Win	22–3–1	Darren Elkins	Decision (unanimous)	UFC Fight Night: Machida vs. Dollaway	20 December 2014	3	5:00	Barueri, Brazil	
Loss	21–3–1	Ricardo Lamas	Decision (unanimous)	UFC Fight Night: Swanson vs. Stephens	28 June 2014	3	5:00	San Antonio, Texas, United States	
Loss	21–2–1	Nik Lentz	Decision (unanimous)	UFC on FX: Belfort vs. Rockhold	18 May 2013	3	5:00	Jaraguá do Sul, Brazil	
Win	21–1–1	Iuri Alcântara	Decision (unanimous)	UFC 147	23 June 2012	3	5:00	Belo Horizonte, Brazil	
Win	20–1–1	Paulo Dantas	Submission (arm-triangle choke)	Shooto Brazil 27	2 December 2011	2	N/A	Brasília, Brazil	Featherweight debut.
Win	19–1–1	Eddie Hoch	Submission (rear-naked choke)	Shooto Brazil 25 - Fight for BOPE	25 August 2011	1	3:25	Rio de Janeiro, Brazil	
Win	18–1–1	Elieni Silva	Decision (unanimous)	Shooto Brazil 22	1 April 2011	3	5:00	Brasília, Brazil	
Win	17–1–1	Arielson Silva	Submission (rear-naked choke)	Shooto Brazil 21	19 February 2011	1	3:17	Rio de Janeiro, Brazil	
Win	16–1–1	Cesario di Domenico	TKO (punches)	Shooto Brazil 17	6 August 2010	2	3:07	Rio de Janeiro, Brazil	
Win	15–1–1	Cyldemar Cyldemar	TKO (punches)	Dojo Combat 1	17 April 2010	1	N/A	Juiz de Fora, Brazil	
Win	14–1–1	César Cunha	Decision (unanimous)	Brazil Fight	13 March 2010	3	5:00	Belo Horizonte, Brazil	
Win	13–1–1	Sidney Lessa	Submission (rear-naked choke)	Shooto Brazil 14	28 November 2009	1	3:30	Rio de Janeiro, Brazil	
Loss	12–1–1	Yui Chul Nam	Decision (unanimous)	M-1 Challenge 17: Korea	4 July 2009	3	5:00	Seoul, South Korea	
Win	12–0–1	Amirkhan Mazihov	Submission (rear-naked choke)	M-1 Challenge 15: Brazil	9 May 2009	1	3:58	São Paulo, Brazil	
Win	11–0–1	Marcos dos Santos	Decision (split)	Santos Fight Festival	6 December 2008	3	5:00	Santos, Brazil	
Win	10–0–1	Marcio Soares	Decision (split)	WOCS 2	25 September 2008	3	5:00	Rio de Janeiro, Brazil	
Win	9–0–1	Rodrigo Ruiz	Decision (unanimous)	Jungle Fight 11	13 September 2008	3	5:00	Rio de Janeiro, Brazil	
Draw	8–0–1	Takafumi Ito	Draw	Pancrase: Shining 2	26 March 2008	3	5:00	Tokyo, Japan	
Win	8–0	Alan Nilson	Decision	Mo Team League 2	29 September 2007	3	5:00	São Paulo, Brazil	
Win	7–0	Willamy Freire	Decision (unanimous)	Shooto Brazil 3 - The Evolution	7 July 2007	3	5:00	Rio de Janeiro, Brazil	
Win	6–0	Leonardo Nogueira	Submission (choke)	Juiz de Fora Fight 4	14 April 2007	2	0:55	Juiz de Fora, Brazil	
Win	5–0	Gustavo Careca	TKO (retirement)	Shooto Brazil 2	24 March 2007	1	5:00	Rio de Janeiro, Brazil	
Win	4–0	Ronirley Souza	Decision (unanimous)	MMA Kombat Espirito Santo	25 November 2006	3	5:00	Vila Velha, Brazil	
Win	3–0	Aldenir Paraiba	Submission (armbar)	Juiz de Fora Fight 3	8 April 2006	2	N/A	Juiz de Fora, Brazil	
Win	2–0	Alex Cobra	Submission (choke)	Real Fight Combat	13 August 2005	2	N/A	São José dos Campos, Brazil	
Win	1–0	Roberto Romanoni	Submission (triangle choke)	Real Fight Combat	13 August 2005	1	N/A	São José dos Campos, Brazil	Lightweight debut.

== See also ==
- List of male mixed martial artists
