= UFC Fight Night: Machida vs. Romero =

UFC mixed martial arts event in 2015

- The poster for UFC Fight Night: Machida vs. Romero
- Promotion: Ultimate Fighting Championship
- Date: June 27, 2015
- Venue: Seminole Hard Rock Hotel and Casino
- City: Hollywood, Florida
- Attendance: 5,604

Event chronology
| UFC Fight Night: Jędrzejczyk vs. Penne | UFC Fight Night: Machida vs. Romero | UFC 189: Mendes vs. McGregor |

UFC Fight Night: Machida vs. Romero (also known as UFC Fight Night 70) was a mixed martial arts event held on June 27, 2015, at the Seminole Hard Rock Hotel and Casino in Hollywood, Florida.

== Background ==
The event was originally expected to be held at the Ginásio do Ibirapuera in São Paulo, Brazil. However, on May 15, the event was moved to the Seminole Hard Rock Hotel and Casino in Hollywood, Florida.

The fight card was also expected to feature the lightweight and bantamweight finals of The Ultimate Fighter: Brazil 4. This was the first time an Ultimate Fighter Brazil Finale event would be held outside of Brazil. However, as the event approached, several international fighters experienced travel restrictions due to technical issues within the Bureau of Consular Affairs division of the U.S. State Department which produces travel visas. The issue led to a major altering of the card as multiple fights were postponed.

The lightweight and bantamweight finals of The Ultimate Fighter: Brazil 4, was instead contested on August 1, 2015 at UFC 190.

A welterweight bout between Rick Story and Erick Silva was expected to serve as the main event. However, after the initial venue change, the bout was moved to a co-featured slot and the event was headlined by a middleweight bout between former UFC Light Heavyweight champion Lyoto Machida and 2000 Summer Olympics silver medalist in freestyle wrestling Yoel Romero. Also affected by the visa issues, Silva was pulled from the event and his bout against Story was rescheduled for UFC Fight Night: Holloway vs. Oliveira.

A light heavyweight bout between Nikita Krylov and Marcos Rogério de Lima was briefly linked to UFC Fight Night 69. However, the pairing was expected to take place at this event. Subsequently, the pairing was postponed again as de Lima faced visa issues.

A featherweight bout between Rani Yahya and Masanori Kanehara also planned for the event was shifted to the UFC Fight Night 71 event on July 15, 2015.

Chas Skelly was briefly linked to a bout with Hacran Dias at the event. However, Skelly was pulled from the card due to illness and was replaced by Levan Makashvili.

A welterweight bout between Viscardi Andrade and Andreas Ståhl was scrapped as Ståhl suffered an injury in the week leading up to the event.

Promotional newcomer Lewis Gonzalez missed weight on his first attempt at the weigh-ins, coming in 3 lb overweight at 174 lb. After having made no attempts to cut further, he was fined 20 percent of his fight purse, which went to Leandro Silva.

In a controversial post-fight interview, Yoel Romero seemed to express disagreement with the Obergefell v. Hodges supreme court ruling. However, during the post fight press conference and subsequent interviews the following day, Romero denied referring to gay marriage and apologized for his comments while maintaining that they were misunderstood and taken out of context.

== Results ==
Main Card (Fox Sports 1)
| Weight class | | | | Method | Round | Time | Notes |
|---|---|---|---|---|---|---|---|
| Middleweight | Yoel Romero | def. | Lyoto Machida | KO (elbows) | 3 | 1:38 |
| Welterweight | Lorenz Larkin | def. | Santiago Ponzinibbio | TKO (punches) | 2 | 3:07 |
| Middleweight | Antônio Carlos Júnior | def. | Eddie Gordon | Submission (rear-naked choke) | 3 | 4:37 |
| Middleweight | Thiago Santos | def. | Steve Bossé | KO (head kick) | 1 | 0:29 |
| Featherweight | Hacran Dias | def. | Levan Makashvili | Decision (split) (28–29, 29–28, 29–28) | 3 | 5:00 |
Preliminary Card (Fox Sports 1)
| Welterweight | Alex Oliveira | def. | Joe Merritt | Decision (unanimous) (30–27, 30–27, 30–27) | 3 | 5:00 |
| Catchweight (174 lb) | Leandro Silva | def. | Lewis Gonzalez | Decision (unanimous) (30–27, 30–27, 29–27) | 3 | 5:00 |
| Welterweight | Tony Sims | def. | Steve Montgomery | TKO (punches) | 1 | 2:43 |
| Bantamweight | Sirwan Kakai | def. | Danny Martinez | Decision (unanimous) (30–27, 30–27, 30–27) | 3 | 5:00 |

== Bonus awards ==
The following fighters were awarded $50,000 bonuses:

- Fight of the Night: Lorenz Larkin vs. Santiago Ponzinibbio
- Performance of the Night: Yoel Romero and Thiago Santos

== Reported payout ==
The following is the reported payout to the fighters as reported to the Florida State Boxing Commission. It does not include sponsor money or "locker room" bonuses often given by the UFC and also do not include the UFC's traditional "fight night" bonuses.

- Yoel Romero: $66,000 ($33,000 win bonus) def. Lyoto Machida: $200,000
- Lorenz Larkin: $66,000 ($33,000 win bonus) def. Santiago Ponzinibbio: $10,000
- Antônio Carlos Júnior: $34,000 ($17,000 win bonus) def. Eddie Gordon: $15,000
- Thiago Santos: $32,000 ($16,000 win bonus) def. Steve Bossé: $10,000
- Hacran Dias: $26,000 ($13,000 win bonus) def. Levan Makasvili: $12,000
- Alex Oliveira: $24,000 ($12,000 win bonus) def. Joe Merritt: $10,000
- Leandro Silva: $28,000 ($13,000 win bonus) def. Lewis Gonzalez: $8,000 ^
- Tony Sims: $20,000 ($10,000 win bonus) def. Steve Montgomery: $10,000
- Sirwan Kakai: $16,000 ($8,000 win bonus) def. Danny Martinez: $12,000

^ Gonzalez was fined $2,000, 20 percent of his purse for failing to make the required weight for his fight with Leandro Silva. That money was issued to Silva, officials confirmed.

== See also ==
- List of UFC events
- 2015 in UFC
