= Alexandre Bezerra =

Brazilian mixed martial arts fighter

Alexandre Bezerra da Silva
- Born: 25 September 1987 (age 39); São Paulo, Brazil
- Other names: Popo
- Height: 5 ft 8 in (1.73 m)
- Weight: 145 lb (66 kg; 10.4 st)
- Division: Featherweight
- Style: Brazilian Jiu-Jitsu
- Fighting out of: Philadelphia, United States
- Team: G13 Brazilian Jiu-jitsu
- Rank: Black belt in Brazilian Jiu-Jitsu
- Years active: (2008–present)

Mixed martial arts record
- Total: 29
- Wins: 22
- By knockout: 7
- By submission: 12
- By decision: 3
- Losses: 7
- By knockout: 1
- By submission: 1
- By decision: 5

Other information
- Mixed martial arts record from Sherdog

Alexandre Bezerra (born 25 September 1987) is a Brazilian mixed martial artist who competes in the featherweight division.

== Mixed martial arts career ==
=== Early career ===
Bezerra made his professional MMA debut in July 2008. He quickly established an 8-1 record over the next two years while fighting in his native Brazil. This drew the attention of Bellator Fighting Championships and he was signed with the company in 2011.

He currently trains in Philadelphia, Pennsylvania at Daddis Fight Camps and at Brazilian Jiu-Jitsu United alongside Roberto Godoi black belt and MMA fighter Wilson Reis.

=== Bellator Fighting Championships ===
Bezzera made his debut for Bellator in June 2011, fighting Sam Jones at Bellator 46. He won the fight via submission in the first round. He subsequently fought Jesse Gross and Scott Heckman and won both fights via submission and TKO.

In his fourth Bellator fight, Bezerra defeated Doug Evans via submission in the first round.

In his fifth Bellator fight, Bezerra defeated Kenny Foster via submission in round 2 to advance to the semifinals of the Bellator Season 6 Featherweight Tournament.

In his sixth Bellator fight, Bezerra was defeated by Marlon Sandro in the Bellator Season 6 Featherweight Tournament Semifinal via split decision.

At Bellator 74, Bezerra was originally scheduled to face The Ultimate Fighter: Live alumni Jeff Smith. However, Smith failed his pre-fight medical and was replaced by Matt McCook in a 157 lb catchweight fight.

=== Professional Fighters League ===
Bezerra made his debut with the Professional Fighters League against Magomed Idrisov at PFL 7 on 30 August 2018. He won the fight via knockout due to a flying knee in the first round.

== Championships and accomplishments ==
- Cage Fury Fighting Championships
  - CFFC Featherweight Championship (One time)

== Mixed martial arts record ==
Professional record breakdown
29 matches	22 wins	7 losses
By knockout	7	1
By submission	12	1
By decision	3	5
Draws	0	

Res.	Record	Opponent	Method	Event	Date	Round	Time	Location	Notes
Loss	22–7	Magomedrasul Khasbulaev	TKO (punches)	ACA 100: Zhamaldaev vs. Froes 2	4 October 2019	3	1:27	Grozny, Russia	
Loss	22–6	Andre Harrison	Decision (majority)	PFL 8	5 October 2018	2	5:00	New Orleans, Louisiana, United States	2018 PFL Featherweight Quarterfinal bout.
Win	22–5	Magomed Idrisov	KO (flying knee)	PFL 7	30 August 2018	1	3:34	Atlantic City, New Jersey, United States	
Win	21–5	Sam Toomer	TKO (punches)	LFA 46	27 July 2018	2	3:00	Newport News, Virginia, United States	
Win	20–5	Ray Wood	Decision (unanimous)	NEF 29 - Stars and Stripes	17 June 2017	3	5:00	Lewiston, Maine, United States	
Loss	19–5	Andre Harrison	Decision (unanimous)	Titan FC 41	9 September 2016	5	5:00	Coral Gables, Florida, United States	For the Titan FC Featherweight Championship
Win	19–4	Dimitre Ivy	Submission (rear naked choke)	XCC 25 - Xtreme Caged Combat 25	12 August 2016	1	1:16	Hatfield, Pennsylvania, United States	
Win	18–4	Frank Caraballo	TKO (punches)	XCC 24 - Xtreme Caged Combat 24	30 April 2016	1	3:57	Bethlehem, Pennsylvania, United States	
Loss	17–4	Levan Makashvili	Decision (unanimous)	CFFC 44: Bezerra vs. Makashvili 2	13 December 2014	5	5:00	Bethlehem, Pennsylvania, United States	Lost CCFC Featherweight Championship
Win	17–3	Levan Makashvili	Decision (majority)	CFFC 38: Felder vs. Johnson	9 August 2014	5	5:00	Atlantic City, New Jersey, United States	Won CCFC Featherweight Championship
Win	16–3	Bruno Dias	Submission (rear-naked choke)	Max Sport: 13.3	2 November 2013	1	3:30	São Paulo, Brazil	
Loss	15–3	Mike Richman	Decision (split)	Bellator 92	7 March 2013	3	5:00	Temecula, California, United States	Bellator Season 8 Featherweight Tournament Semifinal
Win	15–2	Genair da Silva	Submission (armbar)	Bellator 88	7 February 2013	1	1:40	Duluth, Georgia, United States	Featherweight Tournament Quarterfinal
Win	14–2	Matt McCook	Submission (rear-naked choke)	Bellator 74	28 September 2012	1	3:04	Atlantic City, New Jersey, United States	
Loss	13–2	Marlon Sandro	Decision (split)	Bellator 64	6 April 2012	3	5:00	Windsor, Ontario, Canada	Bellator Season 6 Featherweight Tournament Semifinal
Win	13–1	Kenny Foster	Submission (rear-naked choke)	Bellator 60	9 March 2012	2	4:57	Hammond, Indiana, United States	Bellator Season 6 Featherweight Tournament Quarterfinal
Win	12–1	Doug Evans	Submission (ankle lock)	Bellator 57	12 November 2011	1	4:04	Rama, Ontario, Canada	
Win	11–1	Scott Heckman	TKO (punches)	Bellator 49	10 September 2011	2	1:38	Atlantic City, New Jersey, United States	
Win	10–1	Jesse Gross	Submission (rear-naked choke)	Bellator 47	23 July 2011	1	1:28	Rama, Ontario, Canada	
Win	9–1	Sam Jones	Submission (triangle choke)	Bellator 46	25 June 2011	1	3:27	Hollywood, Florida, United States	
Win	8–1	Luis Rogerio de Agostinho	Submission (rear-naked choke)	First Class Fight 5	23 October 2010	1	2:26	São Paulo, Brazil	
Win	7–1	Ivanildo Santos	Submission (armbar)	Ichigeki - Brazil 2010	31 July 2010	1	1:58	São Paulo, Brazil	
Win	6–1	Will Martinez	Submission (guillotine choke)	Locked in the Cage 4	14 May 2010	1	1:36	Philadelphia, Pennsylvania, United States	
Loss	5–1	Charles Oliveira	Submission (anaconda choke)	First Class Fight 3	18 September 2009	2	1:11	São Paulo, Brazil	
Win	5–0	Rôdrigo Ruiz	KO (punches)	Max Fight 6	20 June 2009	1	3:23	São Paulo, Brazil	
Win	4–0	Jonatas Henrique Bernardo	KO (punch)	First Class Fight 2	28 May 2009	1	2:43	São Paulo, Brazil	
Win	3–0	Sergio Soares	Submission (rear-naked choke)	First Class Fight 1	18 March 2009	2	1:41	São Paulo, Brazil	
Win	2–0	Munil Adriano	Decision (unanimous)	Max Fight 5	23 August 2008	3	5:00	Salvador, Brazil	
Win	1–0	Diego Mercurio	KO (punches)	IFC - Vale Tudo	19 July 2008	1	1:30	São Paulo, Brazil	

== See also ==
- List of Bellator MMA alumni
- List of male mixed martial artists
