= 2019 in Absolute Championship Akhmat =

Mixed martial arts events

Information
- First date: January 26, 2019

The year 2019 was the seventh year in the history of the Absolute Championship Akhmat, a mixed martial arts, kickboxing and Brazilian jiu-jitsu promotion based in Russia.

== ACA 2019 Awards ==
The following fighters won the Absolute Championship Akhmat year-end awards for 2019:

- ACA Fight of the Year 2019: Marat Balaev vs. Salman Zhamaldaev (ACA 93)
- ACA Fighter of the Year 2019: Albert Tumenov
- ACA Knockout of the Year 2019: Arman Ospanov (ACA 95)
- ACA Submission of the Year 2019: Khusein Shaikhaev (ACA 102)
- ACA Discovery of the Year 2019: Shamil Shakhbulatov

== List of events ==
=== ACA MMA ===
ACA MMA
No.	Event	Date	Venue	Location
1	ACA 91: Agujev vs. Silvério	January 26, 2019	Sports Hall Coliseum	Grozny, Russia
2	ACA 92: Yagshimuradov vs. Celiński	February 16, 2019	Hala Torwar	Warsaw, Poland
3	ACA 93: Balaev vs. Zhamaldaev	March 16, 2019	Sibur Arena	Saint Petersburg, Russia
4	ACA 94: Bagov vs. Khaliev	March 30, 2019	Basket-Hall	Krasnodar, Russia
5	ACA 95: Tumenov vs. Abdulaev	April 27, 2019	VTB Ice Palace	Moscow, Russia
6	ACA 96: Goncharov vs. Johnson	June 8, 2019	Łódź Sport Arena	Łódź, Poland
7	ACA 98: Khazhirokov vs. Henrique	August 31, 2019	Basket-Hall	Krasnodar, Russia
8	ACA 97: Goncharov vs. Johnson 2	August 31, 2019	Basket-Hall	Krasnodar, Russia
9	ACA 99: Bagov vs. Khaliev	September 27, 2019	VTB Arena	Moscow, Russia
10	ACA 100: Fight Day	October 4, 2019	Sports Hall Coliseum	Grozny, Russia
11	ACA 100: Zhamaldaev vs. Froes 2	October 4, 2019	Sports Hall Coliseum	Grozny, Russia
12	ACA 101: Strus vs. Nemchinov	November 15, 2019	Expo XXI	Warsaw, Poland
13	ACA 102: Tumenov vs. Ushukov	November 29, 2019	Almaty Arena	Almaty, Kazakhstan
14	ACA 103: Yagshimuradov vs. Butorin	December 14, 2019	Sibur Arena	Saint Petersburg, Russia

=== ACA KB ===
ACA KB
No.	Event	Date	Venue	Location
1	ACA KB 18: Battle of Tolstoy-Yurt	March 2, 2019	Sports Hall Coliseum	Grozny, Russia

== ACA 91: Agujev vs. Silvério ==
ACA 91: Agujev vs. Silvério
- Promotion: Absolute Championship Akhmat
- Date: January 26, 2019
- Venue: Sports Hall Coliseum
- City: Grozny, Russia

Absolute Championship Akhmat 91: Agujev vs. Silvério will be a mixed martial arts event held by Absolute Championship Akhmat on January 26, 2019 at the Sports Hall Coliseum in Grozny, Russia.

=== Background ===
This event featured a welterweight bout between Arbi Agujev and former UFC fighter Elias Silvério served as the event headliner.

Bonus awards:

The following fighters will be awarded $10,000 bonuses:

- Fight of the Night: Mansur Khatuev vs. Felipe Silva
- Knockout of the Night: Shamil Shakhbulatov

=== Results ===
ACA 91
Weight Class				Method	Round	Time	Notes
Welterweight 77 kg	(Brazil) Elias Silvério	def.	(Russia) Arbi Agujev	Decision (Unanimous)	3	5:00	
Welterweight 77 kg	(Russia) Beslan Isaev	def.	(Russia) Evgeniy Bondar	TKO (Knee and Punches)	3	0:50	
Middleweight 84 kg	(Russia) Baisangur Vakhitov	def.	(Russia) Alexey Efremov	Decision (Unanimous)	3	5:00	
Welterweight 77 kg	(United States) Brett Cooper	def.	(Russia) Azamat Amagov	Decision (Majority)	3	5:00	
Welterweight 77 kg	(Russia) Imanali Gamzatkhanov	def.	(Russia) Daud Shaikhaev	Decision (Unanimous)	3	5:00	
Featherweight 66 kg	(Brazil) Felipe Froes	def.	(Russia) Saifulla Dzhabrailov	TKO (Punches)	1	0:48	
Preliminary Card
Flyweight 57 kg	(Russia) Murad Zeinulabidov	def.	(Ukraine) Ruslan Abiltarov	KO (Punches)	1	1:13	
Light Heavyweight 93 kg	(Russia) Nasrudin Nasrudinov	def.	(Russia) Rasul Saithozhaev	TKO (Punches)	2	1:55	
Flyweight 57 kg	(Russia) Imran Bukuev	def.	(United States) Darren Mima	Decision (Unanimous)	3	5:00	
Bantamweight 61 kg	(Russia) Murad Kalamov	def.	(Brazil) Daniel Santos	Decision (Unanimous)	3	5:00	
Welterweight 77 kg	(Russia) Husein Kushagov	def.	(Brazil) Roan Carneiro	Decision (Split)	3	5:00	
Bantamweight 61 kg	(Russia) Shamil Shakhbulatov	def.	(Brazil) Dileno Lopes	TKO (Punches)	2	0:42	
Featherweight 66 kg	(Russia) Alikhan Suleimanov	def.	(Kazakhstan) Fanil Rafikov	Decision (Unanimous)	3	5:00	
Flyweight 57 kg	(Russia) Mansur Khatuev	def.	(Brazil) Felipe Silva	Decision (Unanimous)	3	5:00	
Heavyweight 120 kg	(Russia) Kazbek Saidaliev	def.	(Brazil) Roggers Souza	Decision (Unanimous)	3	5:00	
Bantamweight 61 kg	(Brazil) Rodrigo Praia	def.	(Russia) Imran Zhulagov	Decision (Unanimous)	3	5:00	
Light Heavyweight 93 kg	(Kazakhstan) Evgeny Egemberdiev	def.	(Russia) Ivan Lukin	Decision (Unanimous)	3	5:00	
Welterweight 77 kg	(Russia) Vitaliy Nemchinov	def.	(Russia) Khetag Pliev	Decision (Unanimous)	3	5:00	
Bantamweight 61 kg	(Guam) Trevin Jones	def.	(Russia) Mehdi Baidulaev	Submission (Guillotine Choke)	1	4:37	
Featherweight 66 kg	(Russia) Khuseyn Sheikhaev	def.	(Kyrgyzstan) Kanat Keldibekov	Decision (Unanimous)	3	5:00	

== ACA 92: Yagshimuradov vs. Celiński ==
ACA 92: Yagshimuradov vs. Celiński
- Promotion: Absolute Championship Akhmat
- Date: February 16, 2019
- Venue: Hala Torwar
- City: Warsaw, Poland

Absolute Championship Akhmat 92: Yagshimuradov vs. Celiński was a mixed martial arts event held by Absolute Championship Akhmat on February 16, 2019 at the Hala Torwar in Warsaw, Poland.

=== Background ===
Marcin Held was scheduled to face Abdul-Aziz Abdulvakhabov, but Held was forced off the card on February 5 with an injury. Brian Foster served as Held's replacement.

Bonus awards:

The following fighters will be awarded $10,000 bonuses:

- Fight of the Night: Piotr Strus vs Ibragim Chuzhigaev
- Knockout of the Night: Jorge Gonzalez
- $5000 Stoppage Victory Bonuses: Aslambek Saidov, Abdul-Aziz Abdulvakhabov, Tony Johnson, Döwletjan Ýagşymyradow

=== Results ===
ACA 92
Weight Class				Method	Round	Time	Notes
Light Heavyweight 93 kg	(Turkmenistan) Dovletdzhan Yagshimuradov	def.	(Poland) Karol Celiński	TKO (Elbows)	4	4:17	For the ACA Light Heavyweight Championship.
Heavyweight 120 kg	(Poland) Daniel Omielańczuk	def.	(Russia) Zelimkhan Umiev	Decision (Unanimous)	3	5:00	
Middleweight 84 kg	(Turkey) Ibragim Chuzhigaev	def.	(Poland) Piotr Strus	Decision (Split)	3	5:00	
Heavyweight 120 kg	(United States) Tony Johnson Jr.	def.	(Estonia) Denis Smoldarev	Submission (Arm-Triangle Choke)	1	2:44	
Lightweight 70 kg	(Russia) Abdul-Aziz Abdulvakhabov	def.	(United States) Brian Foster	Submission (Arm-Triangle Choke)	1	1:38	
Preliminary Card
Welterweight 77 kg	(Russia) Aslambek Saidov	def.	(Brazil) Ciro Rodrigues	TKO (Doctor Stoppage)	2	1:22	
Featherweight 66 kg	(Brazil) Daniel Oliveira	def.	(Russia) Adlan Bataev	TKO (Punches)	3	1:28	
Middleweight 84 kg	(Poland) Radosław Paczuski	def.	(Poland) Jaroslaw Lech	Decision (Unanimous)	3	5:00	
Light Heavyweight 93 kg	(Mexico) Jorge Gonzalez	def.	(England) Luke Barnatt	KO (Punches)	1	3:05	
Light Heavyweight 93 kg	(Russia) Abdul-Rakhman Dzhanaev	def.	(Brazil) Wendres da Silva	Decision (Split)	3	5:00	
Lightweight 70 kg	(Russia) Amirkhan Adaev	def.	(Mexico) Efraín Escudero	Decision (Split)	3	5:00	
Lightweight 70 kg	(Romania) Aurel Pîrtea	def.	(Russia) Khunkar Osmaev	Decision (Unanimous)	3	5:00	
Bantamweight 61 kg	(Brazil) Josiel Silva	def.	(Russia) Magomed Ginazov	Decision (Majority)	3	5:00	
Heavyweight 120 kg	(Poland) Mateusz Łazowski	def.	(Poland) Dawid Kobiera	KO (Punches)	1	0:55	
Lightweight 70 kg	(Poland) Grzegorz Joniak	def.	(Poland) Shamkhan Erzanukaev	Decision (Majority)	3	5:00	

== ACA KB 18: Battle of Tolstoy-Yurt ==
ACA KB 18: Battle of Tolstoy-Yurt
- Promotion: Absolute Championship Akhmat
- Date: March 2, 2019
- Venue: Sports Hall Coliseum
- City: Grozny, Russia

Absolute Championship Akhmat Kickboxing 18: Battle of Tolstoy-Yurt was a Kickboxing event held by Absolute Championship Akhmat on March 2, 2019 at the Sports Hall Coliseum in Grozny, Russia.

=== Background ===
Bonus awards:

The following fighters will be awarded $5,000 bonuses:

- Fight of the Night:
- Knockout of the Night:
- Submission of the Night:
- $5000 Stoppage Victory Bonuses:

=== Results ===
ACA KB 18
Weight Class				Method	Round	Time	Notes
Catchweight 67 kg	(Russia) Tamerlan Bashirov	def.	(Georgia (country)) Georgi Khufenia	Decision (Unanimous)	3	3:00	
Catchweight 57 kg	(Russia) Khamid Paskhaev	vs.	(Georgia (country)) Spartak Shengelia				

== ACA 93: Balaev vs. Zhamaldaev ==
ACA 93: Balaev vs. Zhamaldaev
- Promotion: Absolute Championship Akhmat
- Date: March 16, 2019
- Venue: Sibur Arena
- City: Saint Petersburg, Russia

Absolute Championship Akhmat 93: Balaev vs. Zhamaldaev was a mixed martial arts event held by Absolute Championship Akhmat on March 16, 2019 at the Sibur Arena in Saint Petersburg, Russia.

=== Background ===
This event feature two title fights, first the former ACB featherweight champion Marat Balaev will face the WFCA featherweight champion Salman Zhamaldaev to determine the ACA featherweight champion as the event headliner. And the ACB bantamweight champions Rustam Kerimov and WFCA bantamweight champions Abdul-Rakhman Dudaev will collide to unify titles and determine the ACA bantamweight champion as co-headliner.

Timur Nagibin was set to fight with Lambert Akhiadov but he has to withdraw the day before the fight due to health issues. As a result of this, the fight was canceled.

Bonus awards:

The following fighters will be awarded $10,000 bonuses:

- Fight of the Night: Marat Balaev vs. Salman Zhamaldaev
- Submission of the Night: Khamzat Aushev
- $5000 Stoppage Victory Bonuses: Kurban Gadzhiev, Rene Pessoa, Tural Ragimov, Amir Aliakbari

=== Results ===
ACA 93
Weight Class				Method	Round	Time	Notes
Featherweight 66 kg	(Russia) Salman Zhamaldaev	def.	(Russia) Marat Balaev	Decision (Unanimous)	5	5:00	For the ACA Featherweight Championship.
Bantamweight 61 kg	(Russia) Rustam Kerimov	def.	(Russia) Abdul-Rakhman Dudaev	Decision (Unanimous)	5	5:00	For the ACA Bantamweight Championship.
Light Heavyweight 93 kg	(Russia) Aleksei Butorin	def.	(Spain) Jose Daniel Toledo	TKO (Doctor Stoppage)	1	5:00	
Bantamweight 61 kg	(Russia) Mikhail Malyutin	def.	(United States) Rob Emerson	Decision (Unanimous)	3	5:00	
Lightweight 70 kg	(Brazil) Hacran Dias	def.	(Russia) Ustarmagomed Gadzhidaudov	Decision (Split)	3	5:00	
Preliminary Card
Heavyweight 120 kg	(Iran) Amir Aliakbari	def.	(United States) Shelton Graves	TKO (Punches)	1	4:44	
Featherweight 66 kg	(Azerbaijan) Tural Ragimov	def.	(Russia) Akhmed Shervaniev	TKO (Knee and Punches)	1	0:26	
Light Heavyweight 93 kg	(Russia) Muslim Magomedov	def.	(United States) Chris Camozzi	TKO (Doctor Stoppage)	3	1:03	
Featherweight 66 kg	(Belarus) Apti Bimarzaev	def.	(Peru) Luis Palomino	Decision (Split)	3	5:00	
Lightweight 70 kg	(Russia) Khamzat Aushev	def.	(Russia) Egor Golubtsov	Submission (Guillotine Choke)	1	1:38	
Light Heavyweight 93 kg	(Kazakhstan) Asylzhan Bakhytzhanuly	def.	(Ukraine) Vasily Babich	Decision (Unanimous)	3	5:00	
Middleweight 84 kg	(Brazil) Rene Pessoa	def.	(Russia) Khamzat Sakalov	Submission (Standing Guillotine)	1	2:21	
Middleweight 84 kg	(Russia) Magomed Mutaev	vs.	(Bulgaria) Nikola Dipchikov	NC (Accidental Eyepoke)	1	2:04	
Flyweight 57 kg	(Russia) Kurban Gadzhiev	def.	(Argentina) Nicolas Varela	Submission (Rear-Naked Choke)	3	3:54	

== ACA 94: Bagov vs. Khaliev ==
ACA 94: Bagov vs. Khaliev
- Promotion: Absolute Championship Akhmat
- Date: March 30, 2019
- Venue: Basket-Hall
- City: Krasnodar, Russia

Absolute Championship Akhmat 94: Bagov vs. Khaliev was a mixed martial arts event held by Absolute Championship Akhmat on March 30, 2019 at the Basket-Hall in Krasnodar, Russia.

=== Background ===
This event was set to feature a unification bout between the ACB lightweight champion Ali Bagov and the WFCA lightweight champion Khusein Khaliev to determine the ACA lightweight champion as the event headliner. However at the weigh-ins, Bagov weighed in at 72 kilograms, 1.75 kilograms over the lightweight limit for a title fight. Bagov was given additional time to make weight, but he refused to do so. The ACA commission explained to Bagov that because he missed weight the bout will proceed as a non-title contest. Bagov refused to fight, that forced the fight to be cancelled. He was suspended for 6 months for breach of contract.

The ACB heavyweight champions Mukhumat Vakhaev was set to face WFCA heavyweight champions Evgeniy Goncharov in the co-main event for ACB/WFCA unification bout. But Vakhaev was pulled from the card due to illness, that forced the fight to be cancelled.

The WFCA welterweight champion Murad Abdullaev was set to fight with the ACB welterweight champion Albert Tumenov, but Abdullaev has to withdraw due to health issues. As a result of this, the title unification fight was moved to ACA 95.

Adrick Croes faced Isa Umarov at ACB 94. He replaced Nicolae Negumereanu who signed with the UFC earlier this month.

Bonus awards:

The following fighters will be awarded $10,000 bonuses:

- Fight of the Night: Islam Meshev vs. Nashkho Galaev
- Submission of the Night: Isa Umarov
- $5000 Stoppage Victory Bonuses: Ramazan Kishev, Ioannis Arzoumanidis

=== Results ===
ACA 94
Weight Class				Method	Round	Time	Notes
Featherweight 66 kg	(Russia) Magomedrasul Khasbulaev	def.	(Russia) Mukhamed Kokov	Decision (Unanimous)	3	5:00	
Flyweight 57 kg	(Russia) Rasul Albaskhanov	def.	(Russia) Goga Shamatava	Decision (Unanimous)	3	5:00	
Middleweight 84 kg	(Russia) Valery Myasnikov	def.	(Kazakhstan) Igor Svirid	Decision (Unanimous)	3	5:00	
Featherweight 66 kg	(Russia) Ramazan Kishev	def.	(Russia) Islam Isaev	KO (Knee)	1	4:27	
Preliminary Card
Heavyweight 120 kg	(Greece) Ioannis Arzoumanidis	def.	(Russia) Amirkhan Isagadzhiev	TKO (Punches)	2	2:22	
Bantamweight 61 kg	(Russia) Islam Meshev	def.	(Russia) Nashkho Galaev	Decision (Split)	3	5:00	
Welterweight 77 kg	(Brazil) Oton Jasse	def.	(Russia) Imran Abaev	Submission (Triangle Choke)	3	3:40	
Flyweight 57 kg	(Brazil) Charles Henrique	def.	(Russia) Kasum Kasumov	Decision (Unanimous)	3	5:00	
Featherweight 66 kg	(Russia) Askhab Zulaev	def.	(Brazil) Otavio Dos Santos	Decision (Unanimous)	3	5:00	
Light Heavyweight 93 kg	(Russia) Isa Umarov	def.	(Aruba) Adrick Croes	Submission (Kimura)	1	1:58	
Flyweight 57 kg	(Russia) Azamat Kerefov	def.	(Armenia) Narek Avagyan	Decision (Unanimous)	3	5:00	
Flyweight 57 kg	(Russia) Alexey Shaposhnikov	def.	(Kazakhstan) Dias Erengaipov	Decision (Unanimous)	3	5:00	

== ACA 95: Tumenov vs. Abdulaev ==
ACA 95: Tumenov vs. Abdulaev
- Promotion: Absolute Championship Akhmat
- Date: April 27, 2019
- Venue: VTB Ice Palace
- City: Moscow, Russia

Absolute Championship Akhmat 95: Tumenov vs. Abdulaev was a mixed martial arts event held by Absolute Championship Akhmat on April 27, 2019 at the VTB Ice Palace in Moscow, Russia.

=== Background ===
Azam Gaforov was scheduled to face Yunus Evloev for the vacant ACA Flyweight Championship, but Gaforov was forced off the card on march 4 with an injury. Josiel Silva served as Gaforov replacement.

Batraz Agnaev was scheduled to fight against Cory Hendricks but Hendricks suffered an injury during training and was forced to withdraw from the fight. Evgeniy Egemberdiev has stepped in on short notice against Agnaev.

Rasul Mirzaev has suffered fingers injury during training and has been unable to compete, that forced his fight against Felipe Froes to be cancelled.

Alexander Peduson was supposed to face Fatkhidin Sobirov. However, Peduson suffered an injury during training and was forced to withdraw from the fight. Cleverson Silva has stepped in on short notice against Sobirov.

Bonus awards:

The following fighters will be awarded $10,000 bonuses:

- Fight of the Night: Beslan Ushukov vs. Gadzhimurad Khiramagomedov
- Knockout of the Night: Arman Ospanov
- $5000 Stoppage Victory Bonuses: Ilya Sheglov, Evgeniy Egemberdiev, Sergey Bilostenniy, Magomed Ismailov, Salamu Abdurahmanov

=== Results ===
ACA 95
Weight Class				Method	Round	Time	Notes
Welterweight 77 kg	(Russia) Albert Tumenov	def.	(Russia) Murad Abdulaev	Decision (Unanimous)	5	5:00	For the ACA Welterweight Championship.
Middleweight 84 kg	(Russia) Salamu Abdurahmanov	def.	(United States) Brett Cooper	Submission (Anaconda Choke)	1	2:46	For the ACA Middleweight Championship.
Flyweight 57 kg	(Russia) Yunus Evloev	def.	(Brazil) Josiel Silva	Decision (Split)	5	5:00	For the ACA Flyweight Championship.
Bantamweight 61 kg	(Brazil) Francisco de Lima	def.	(Russia) Oleg Borisov	Decision (Split)	3	5:00	
Welterweight 77 kg	(Russia) Beslan Ushukov	def.	(Russia) Gadzhimurad Khiramagomedov	Decision (Split)	3	5:00	
Preliminary Card
Lightweight 70 kg	(Russia) Eduard Vartanyan	def.	(United States) Joshua Aveles	Decision (Unanimous)	3	5:00	
Middleweight 84 kg	(Russia) Magomed Ismailov	def.	(Russia) Vyacheslav Vasilevsky	TKO (Punches)	1	2:20	
Welterweight 77 kg	(Russia) Sharaf Davlatmurodov	def.	(Brazil) Ismael de Jesus	Decision (Unanimous)	3	5:00	
Featherweight 66 kg	(Russia) Dzhihad Yunusov	def.	(Brazil) Thiago Luis Bonifacio Silva	Decision (Unanimous)	3	5:00	
Heavyweight 120 kg	(Russia) Sergey Bilostenniy	def.	(England) Mark Godbeer	TKO (Punches)	1	2:04	
Featherweight 66 kg	(Russia) Alexey Polpudnikov	def.	(Russia) Abdul-Rarkhman Temirov	Decision (Split)	3	5:00	
Featherweight 66 kg	(Kazakhstan) Arman Ospanov	def.	(Germany) Lom-Ali Eskijew	KO (Knee and Punch)	2	0:11	
Bantamweight 61 kg	(Brazil) Cleverson Silva	def.	(Tajikistan) Fatkhidin Sobirov	DQ (Illegal Kick)	2	2:14	
Light Heavyweight 93 kg	(Kazakhstan) Evgeniy Egemberdiev	def.	(Russia) Batraz Agnaev	TKO (Punches)	2	2:26	
Light Heavyweight 93 kg	(Russia) Ilya Sheglov	def.	(Russia) Alexey Stoyan	TKO (Punches)	1	4:59	

== ACA 96: Goncharov vs. Johnson ==
ACA 96: Goncharov vs. Johnson
- Promotion: Absolute Championship Akhmat
- Date: June 8, 2019
- Venue: Łódź Sport Arena
- City: Łódź, Poland

Absolute Championship Akhmat 96: Goncharov vs. Johnson was a mixed martial arts event held by Absolute Championship Akhmat on June 8, 2019 at the Łódź Sport Arena in Łódź, Poland.

=== Background ===
Bonus awards:

The following fighters will be awarded $10,000 bonuses:

- Knockout of the Night: Luke Barnatt
- Submission of the Night: Rodolfo Vieira
- $5000 Stoppage Victory Bonuses: Radoslaw Paczuski, Daniel Omielańczuk, Arseniy Sultanov, Carlos Eduardo

=== Results ===
ACA 96
Weight Class				Method	Round	Time	Notes
Heavyweight 120 kg	(Russia) Evgeniy Goncharov	vs.	(United States) Tony Johnson	No Contest (Accidental Eye Poke)	3	0:49	For the ACA Heavyweight Championship.
Middleweight 84 kg	(Poland) Piotr Strus	def.	(Bulgaria) Svetlozar Savov	Decision (Unanimous)	3	5:00	
Lightweight 70 kg	(Poland) Marcin Held	def.	(Brazil) Diego Brandão	Decision (Unanimous)	3	5:00	
Light Heavyweight 93 kg	(England) Luke Barnatt	def.	(Poland) Karol Celiński	KO (Punch)	1	1:29	
Heavyweight 120 kg	(Poland) Daniel Omielańczuk	def.	(Russia) Evgeny Erokhin	TKO (Punches)	1	1:33	
Preliminary Card
Welterweight 77 kg	(Russia) Arseniy Sultanov	def.	(Poland) Marcin Bandel	TKO (Punches)	1	2:34	
Featherweight 66 kg	(Brazil) Felipe Froes	def.	(Sweden) Frantz Slioa	Decision (Majority)	3	5:00	
Middleweight 84 kg	(Poland) Radoslaw Paczuski	def.	(Poland) Damian Ostep	KO (Punch)	1	3:13	
Welterweight 77 kg	(Brazil) Elias Silvério	def.	(United States) Fernando Gonzalez	Decision (Unanimous)	3	5:00	
Welterweight 77 kg	(Poland) Łukasz Kopera	def.	(Poland) Łukasz Rajewski	Submission (Guillotine Choke)	3	2:09	
Welterweight 77 kg	(Poland) Paweł Pawlak	def.	(Russia) Evgeny Bondar	Decision (Split)	3	5:00	
Lightweight 70 kg	(Russia) Denis Kanakov	def.	(England) Andre Winner	Decision (Unanimous)	3	5:00	
Welterweight 77 kg	(Brazil) Rodolfo Vieira	def.	(Russia) Vitaliy Nemchinov	Submission (Rear-Naked Choke)	1	2:03	
Bantamweight 61 kg	(Russia) Igor Zhirkov	def.	(Brazil) Augusto Mendes	Decision (Split)	3	5:00	
Light Heavyweight 93 kg	(Brazil) Carlos Eduardo	def.	(Tunisia) Sami Antar	TKO (Punches)	2	1:21	
Featherweight 66 kg	(Brazil) Alan Gomes	def.	(Armenia) Narek Avagyan	TKO (Doctor Stoppage)	1	5:00	

== ACA 98: Khazhirokov vs. Henrique ==
ACA 98: Khazhirokov vs. Henrique
- Promotion: Absolute Championship Akhmat
- Date: August 31, 2019
- Venue: Basket-Hall
- City: Krasnodar, Russia

Absolute Championship Akhmat 98: Khazhirokov vs. Henrique was a mixed martial arts event held by Absolute Championship Akhmat on August 31, 2019 at the Basket-Hall in Krasnodar, Russia.

=== Background ===
Bonus awards:

The following fighters will be awarded $10,000 bonuses:

- Fight of the Night: Rasul Shovhalov vs. Efrain Escudero
- Knockout of the Night: Andrey Goncharov
- Submission of the Night: Ruslan Abiltarov
- $5000 Stoppage Victory Bonuses: Kyle Reyes, Maycon Silvan, Tural Ragimov, Aurel Pîrtea, Charles Henrique

=== Results ===
ACA 98
Weight Class				Method	Round	Time	Notes
Flyweight 57 kg	(Brazil) Charles Henrique	def.	(Russia) Valeriy Khazhirokov	TKO (Punches)	2	0:34	
Lightweight 70 kg	(Romania) Aurel Pîrtea	def.	(Russia) Abdul-Rakhman Makhazhiev	Submission (Triangle Choke)	2	1:30	
Featherweight 66 kg	(Azerbaijan) Tural Ragimov	def.	(Belarus) Ivan Zhvirblia	Submission (Guillotine Choke)	1	1:57	
Lightweight 70 kg	(Russia) Rasul Shovhalov	def.	(Mexico) Efraín Escudero	Decision (Unanimous)	3	5:00	
Featherweight 66 kg	(Russia) Andrey Goncharov	def.	(Kazakhstan) Fanil Rafikov	KO (Punch)	2	4:15	
Bantamweight 61 kg	(Brazil) Maycon Silvan	def.	(Russia) Magomed Ginazov	Submission (Rear-Naked Choke)	2	2:56	
Featherweight 66 kg	(Guam) Kyle Reyes	def.	(Russia) Kharon Orzumiev	KO (Punches)	1	1:29	
Bantamweight 61 kg	(Brazil) Rodrigo Praia	def.	(Russia) Salamu Zakarov	Decision (Unanimous)	3	5:00	
Featherweight 66 kg	(Russia) Makharbek Karginov	def.	(Brazil) Daniel Oliveira	Decision (Split)	3	5:00	
Featherweight 66 kg	(Russia) Makhochi Sagitov	def.	(Russia) Khusein Maltsagov	Submission (Triangle Choke)	1	1:48	
Flyweight 57 kg	(Ukraine) Ruslan Abiltarov	def.	(Russia) Azamat Pshukov	Submission (Guillotine Choke)	3	0:29	
Flyweight 57 kg	(Russia) Murad Magomedov	def.	(Brazil) Miguel da Silva	Decision (Unanimous)	3	5:00	

== ACA 97: Goncharov vs. Johnson 2 ==
ACA 97: Goncharov vs. Johnson 2
- Promotion: Absolute Championship Akhmat
- Date: August 31, 2019
- Venue: Basket-Hall
- City: Krasnodar, Russia

Absolute Championship Akhmat 97: Goncharov vs. Johnson 2 was a mixed martial arts event held by Absolute Championship Akhmat on August 31, 2019 at the Basket-Hall in Krasnodar, Russia.

=== Background ===
Hacran Dias was to challenge Yusuf Raisov at this event, but had to withdraw due to undisclosed reasons. He was replaced by Joao Luiz Nogueira, who stepped in on short notice for this encounter.

Arbi Agujev was scheduled to face Bruno Santos, but Agujev was forced off the card due to undisclosed reasons. Vycheslav Babkin served as Agujev's replacement.

A featherweight bout between Adlan Bataev and Mukhamed Kokov was previously scheduled for ACA 97. However, Kokov pulled out of the fight due to weight issues and the bout was scrapped.

Bonus awards:

The following fighters will be awarded $10,000 bonuses:

- Fight of the Night: Goga Shamatava vs. Azamat Kerefov
- Knockout of the Night: Apti Bimarzaev
- $5000 Stoppage Victory Bonuses: Islam Meshev, Nasrudin Nasrudinov, Denis Smoldarev, Vyacheslav Babkin, Aleksei Butorin, Nikola Dipchikov

=== Results ===
ACA 97
Weight Class				Method	Round	Time	Notes
Heavyweight 120 kg	(Russia) Evgeniy Goncharov	def.	(United States) Tony Johnson	Decision (Unanimous)	5	5:00	For the ACA Heavyweight Championship.
Welterweight 77 kg	(Russia) Mukhamed Berkhamov	def.	(Brazil) Ciro Rodrigues	Decision (Unanimous)	3	5:00	
Flyweight 57 kg	(Russia) Azamat Kerefov	def.	(Russia) Goga Shamatava	Decision (Split)	3	5:00	
Lightweight 70 kg	(Russia) Yusuf Raisov	def.	(Brazil) João Luis Nogueira	Decision (Unanimous)	3	5:00	
Middleweight 84 kg	(Bulgaria) Nikola Dipchikov	def.	(Russia) Alexey Efremov	TKO (Punches)	1	0:41	
Preliminary Card
Light Heavyweight 93 kg	(Russia) Aleksei Butorin	def.	(Kazakhstan) Evgeny Egemberdiev	TKO (Head Kick and Punches)	1	4:44	
Middleweight 84 kg	(Russia) Vyacheslav Babkin	def.	(Brazil) Bruno Santos	TKO (Punches)	1	2:37	
Light Heavyweight 93 kg	(Russia) Muslim Magomedov	def.	(Russia) Ilya Shcheglov	Decision (Unanimous)	3	5:00	
Featherweight 66 kg	(Russia) Ramazan Kishev	def.	(Belarus) Apti Bimarzaev	TKO (Punches)	2	1:26	
Lightweight 70 kg	(Russia) Viskhan Magomadov	def.	(Russia) Timur Nagibin	Decision (Majority)	3	5:00	
Heavyweight 120 kg	(Estonia) Denis Smoldarev	def.	(Greece) Ioannis Arzoumanidis	TKO (Punches)	1	3:42	
Light Heavyweight 93 kg	(Russia) Nasrudin Nasrudinov	def.	(Mexico) Jorge Gonzalez	TKO (Punches)	2	3:59	
Bantamweight 61 kg	(Russia) Islam Meshev	def.	(Russia) Murad Kalamov	TKO (Punches)	2	3:07	

== ACA 99: Bagov vs. Khaliev ==
ACA 99: Bagov vs. Khaliev
- Promotion: Absolute Championship Akhmat
- Date: September 27, 2019
- Venue: VTB Arena
- City: Moscow, Russia

Absolute Championship Akhmat 99: Bagov vs. Khaliev will be a mixed martial arts event held by Absolute Championship Akhmat on September 27, 2019 at the VTB Arena in Moscow, Russia.

=== Background ===
Frantz Slioa was expected to face Musa Khamanaev at this event. However, Khamanaev tipped the scales at 69.4 kilos at the official weigh-ins on Thursday. His bout with Slioa was subsequently canceled, per ACB.

At the weigh-ins, Imanali Gamzatkhanov, Baz Mohammad Mubariz and Adam Townsend all missed weight for their respective bouts. They were fined.

Bonus awards:

The following fighters will be awarded $10,000 bonuses:

- Fight of the Night: Magomed Ismailov vs. Artem Frolov
- Knockout of the Night: Shamil Shakhbulatov
- Submission of the Night: Abdul-Rakhmad Dudaev
- $5000 Stoppage Victory Bonuses: Sharaf Davlatmurodov, Ibragim Chuzhigaev, Alexey Polpudnikov, Murad Abdulaev, Abdul-Aziz Abdulvakhabov, Ali Bagov

=== Results ===
ACA 99
Weight Class				Method	Round	Time	Notes
Lightweight 70 kg	(Russia) Ali Bagov	def.	(Russia) Khusein Khaliev	Submission (Kimura)	4	3:41	For the ACA Lightweight Championship.
Flyweight 57 kg	(Russia) Yunus Evloev	def.	(Tajikistan) Azam Gaforov	Decision (Unanimous)	5	5:00	For the ACA Flyweight Championship.
Bantamweight 61 kg	(Russia) Abdul-Rakhman Dudaev	def.	(Russia) Oleg Borisov	Submission (Guillotine Choke)	2	0:50	
Lightweight 70 kg	(Russia) Abdul-Aziz Abdulvakhabov	def.	(Russia) Imanali Gamzatkhanov	Submission (Rear-Naked Choke)	2	4:21	
Lightweight 70 kg	(Russia) Denis Kanakov	def.	(Afghanistan) Baz Mohammad Mubariz	Decision (Unanimous)	3	5:00	
Preliminary Card
Middleweight 84 kg	(Russia) Magomed Ismailov	def.	(Russia) Artem Frolov	Decision (Unanimous)	3	5:00	
Bantamweight 61 kg	(Russia) Shamil Shakhbulatov	def.	(Russia) Rasul Mirzaev	KO (Punch)	1	3:57	
Welterweight 77 kg	(Russia) Murad Abdulaev	def.	(Russia) Vyacheslav Vasilevsky	TKO (Elbows)	2	3:46	
Featherweight 66 kg	(Russia) Alexey Polpudnikov	def.	(Kazakhstan) Arman Ospanov	TKO (Punches)	2	4:45	
Welterweight 77 kg	(Russia) Gadzhimurad Khiramagomedov	def.	(United States) Adam Townsend	Decision (Unanimous)	3	5:00	
Middleweight 84 kg	(Turkey) Ibragim Chuzhigaev	def.	(Dominican Republic) Alex Garcia	TKO (Punches)	1	1:50	
Middleweight 84 kg	(Russia) Sharaf Davlatmurodov	def.	(United States) Brett Cooper	TKO (Punches)	2	0:24	
Bantamweight 61 kg	(Brazil) Cleverson Silva	def.	(Tajikistan) Fatkhidin Sobirov	TKO (Injury)	1	1:09	
Welterweight 77 kg	(Russia) Vitaliy Slipenko	def.	(Russia) Evgeny Bondar	Decision (Split)	3	5:00	

== ACA 100: Zhamaldaev vs. Froes 2 ==
ACA 100: Zhamaldaev vs. Froes 2
- Promotion: Absolute Championship Akhmat
- Date: October 4, 2019
- Venue: Sports Hall Coliseum
- City: Grozny, Russia

Absolute Championship Akhmat 100: Zhamaldaev vs. Froes 2 will be a mixed martial arts event held by Absolute Championship Akhmat on October 4, 2019 at the Sports Hall Coliseum in Grozny, Russia.

=== Background ===
A bantamweight bout between Dileno Lopes and Khuseyn Sheikhaev was previously scheduled for this card. However, Lopes pulled out of the fight due to visa issue and the bout was scrapped.

Khamzat Aushev was scheduled to face Zhorobek Teshebaev, but Aushev was forced off the card due to health issue, the bout was scrapped.

Yusup Umarov was expected to face Magomedsaygid Alibekov at this event. However, Alibekov tipped the scales at 75 kilos at the official weigh-ins on Thursday, 5 kilos overweight. His bout with Umarov was subsequently canceled, per ACA.

Bonus awards:

The following fighters will be awarded $10,000 bonuses:

- Fight of the Night: Felipe Froes vs. Salman Zhamaldaev
- Knockout of the Night: Imran Bukuev
- Submission of the Night: Rasul Albaskhanov
- $5000 Stoppage Victory Bonuses: Akhmed Musakaev, Khasein Shaikhaev, Adlan Mamaev, Herdeson Batista, Artem Reznikov, Askhab Zulaev, Asylzhan Bakhytzhanuly, Ustarmagomed Gadzhidaudov, Magomedrasul Khasbulaev, Magomed Bibulatov

=== Results ===
==== ACA 100: Fight Day ====
ACA 100: Fight Day
Weight Class				Method	Round	Time	Notes
Middleweight 84 kg	(Brazil) Wendres da Silva	def.	(Russia) Baisangur Vakhitov	Decision (Unanimous)	3	5:00	
Featherweight 66 kg	(Russia) Askhab Zulaev	def.	(Bulgaria) Tihomir Blagovestov	TKO (Punches)	2	1:37	
Middleweight 84 kg	(Russia) Husein Kushagov	def.	(Russia) Evgeniy Belyaev	Decision (Unanimous)	3	5:00	
Lightweight 70 kg	(Kazakhstan) Artem Reznikov	def.	(Russia) Khasan Khaliev	Submission (North–South Choke)	1	4:01	
Featherweight 66 kg	(Russia) Alikhan Suleymanov	def.	(Brazil) Otávio dos Santos	Decision (Unanimous)	3	5:00	
Lightweight 70 kg	(Russia) Aydi Umakhanov	def.	(Kyrgyzstan) Erlan Ulukbekov	Decision (Unanimous)	3	5:00	
Lightweight 70 kg	(Brazil) Herdeson Batista	def.	(Russia) Alibek Akhazaev	TKO (Punches)	2	3:34	
Featherweight 66 kg	(Kyrgyzstan) Ruslan Emilbek Uulu	def.	(Russia) Lambert Akhiadov	Decision (Unanimous)	3	5:00	
Featherweight 66 kg	(Russia) Adlan Mamaev	def.	(Tajikistan) Bekhruz Zukhurov	Submission (Arm-Triangle Choke)	3	2:01	
Featherweight 66 kg	(Russia) Kurban Taigibov	def.	(Brazil) José Vagno Soares	Decision (Unanimous)	3	5:00	
Bantamweight 61 kg	(Russia) Khasein Shaikhaev	def.	(Russia) Beslan Shibzukhov	Submission (Guillotine Choke)	1	4:02	
Lightweight 70 kg	(Russia) Adam Aliev	def.	(Lithuania) Mindaugas Veržbickas	Decision (Unanimous)	3	5:00	
Bantamweight 66 kg	(Kyrgyzstan) Kanat Keldibekov	def.	(Russia) Dukvakha Astamirov	Decision (Unanimous)	3	5:00	
Featherweight 66 kg	(Russia) Akhmed Musakaev	def.	(Russia) Asker Tarkanov	TKO (Punches)	2	2:41	

== ACA 100 ==
ACA 100
Weight Class				Method	Round	Time	Notes
Featherweight 66 kg	(Brazil) Felipe Froes	def.	(Russia) Salman Zhamaldaev (c)	Decision (Unanimous)	5	5:00	For the ACA Featherweight Championship.
Flyweight 57 kg	(Russia) Magomed Bibulatov	def.	(Brazil) Josiel Silva	TKO (Knee Injury)	2	2:40	
Welterweight 77 kg	(Russia) Abubakar Vagaev	def.	(United States) Fernando Gonzalez	Decision (Unanimous)	3	5:00	
Featherweight 66 kg	(Russia) Magomedrasul Khasbulaev	def.	(Brazil) Alexandre Bezerra	TKO (Punches)	3	1:27	
Welterweight 77 kg	(Russia) Beslan Isaev	def.	(Uzbekistan) Bekzod Nurmatov	Decision (Split)	3	5:00	
Preliminary Card
Featherweight 66 kg	(Brazil) Diego Brandão	def.	(Russia) Dzhihad Yunusov	Decision (Split)	3	5:00	
Flyweight 57 kg	(Russia) Rasul Albaskhanov	def.	(Brazil) Jose Maria Tome	Submission (Arm-Triangle Choke)	1	2:09	
Middleweight 84 kg	(Russia) Ibragim Magomedov	def.	(Russia) Abdul-Rahman Dzhanaev	Decision (Unanimous)	3	5:00	
Welterweight 77 kg	(Russia) Ustarmagomed Gadzhidaudov	def.	(United States) Jesse Taylor	Submission (Guillotine Choke)	1	1:13	
Flyweight 57 kg	(Russia) Imran Bukuev	def.	(Brazil) Alan Gomes	TKO (Punches)	3	0:20	
Light Heavyweight 93 kg	(Kazakhstan) Asylzhan Bakhytzhanuly	def.	(Russia) Alexey Stoyan	TKO (Punches)	1	4:56	

== ACA 101: Strus vs. Nemchinov ==
ACA 101: Strus vs. Nemchinov
- Promotion: Absolute Championship Akhmat
- Date: November 15, 2019
- Venue: Expo XXI
- City: Warsaw, Poland

Absolute Championship Akhmat 101: Strus vs. Nemchinov was a mixed martial arts event held by Absolute Championship Akhmat on November 15, 2019 at the Expo XXI in Warsaw, Poland.

=== Background ===
Alexander Peduson has been forced to withdraw from his scheduled fight against Rob Emerson due to undisclosed reasons. Emerson instead faced the Brazilian Dileno Lopes, who stepped in on short notice for this encounter.

Bonus awards:

The following fighters will be awarded $10,000 bonuses:

- Knockout of the Night: Daniel Omielańczuk
- $5000 Stoppage Victory Bonuses: Dileno Lopes, Alikhan Vakhaev, Lom-Ali Eskiev, Radosław Paczuski

=== Results ===
ACA 101
Weight Class				Method	Round	Time	Notes
Middleweight 84 kg	(Poland) Piotr Strus	def.	(Russia) Vitaly Nemchinov	Decision (Unanimous)	3	5:00	
Heavyweight 120 kg	(Poland) Daniel Omielańczuk	def.	(Estonia) Denis Smoldarev	KO (Elbow)	1	4:40	
Welterweight 77 kg	(Brazil) Elias Silvério	def.	(Russia) Aslambek Saidov	Decision (Unanimous)	3	5:00	
Middleweight 84 kg	(Poland) Radosław Paczuski	def.	(Poland) Daniel Płonka	KO (Punches)	1	0:29	
Light Heavyweight 93 kg	(Poland) Karol Celiński	def.	(Tunisia) Sami Antar	Decision (Unanimous)	3	5:00	
Preliminary Card
Lightweight 70 kg	(Russia) Amirkhan Adaev	def.	(United States) Brian Foster	DQ (Illegal Upkick)	2	3:17	
Featherweight 66 kg	(Russia) Lom-Ali Eskiev	def.	(Ukraine) Dmitriy Parubchenko	TKO (Punches)	1	4:21	
Heavyweight 120 kg	(Poland) Mateusz Łazowski	def.	(Poland) Przemysław Dzwoniarek	Decision (Unanimous)	3	5:00	
Heavyweight 120 kg	(Russia) Ruslan Magomedov	def.	(United States) Daniel James	Decision (Unanimous)	3	5:00	
Heavyweight 120 kg	(Russia) Alikhan Vakhaev	def.	(United States) Shelton Graves	TKO (Punches)	3	3:41	
Featherweight 66 kg	(Georgia (country)) Levan Makashvili	def.	(Germany) Attilla Korkmaz	Decision (Unanimous)	3	5:00	
Bantamweight 61 kg	(Brazil) Dileno Lopes	def.	(United States) Rob Emerson	Submission (Guillotine Choke)	1	3:00	

== ACA 102: Tumenov vs. Ushukov ==
ACA 102: Tumenov vs. Ushukov
- Promotion: Absolute Championship Akhmat
- Date: November 29, 2019
- Venue: Almaty Arena
- City: Almaty, Kazakhstan

Absolute Championship Akhmat 102: Tumenov vs. Ushukov was a mixed martial arts event held by Absolute Championship Akhmat on November 29, 2019 at the Almaty Arena in Almaty, Kazakhstan.

=== Background ===
Augusto Mendes was supposed to face Nursultan Kasymkhanov. However, Mendes suffered an injury during training and was forced to withdraw from the fight. Aleksander Peduson has stepped in on two weeks notice against Kasymkhanov.

Evgeniy Egemberdiev was expected to face Jose Daniel Toledo at the event, but pulled out of the bout on January 11 due to a back injury. He was replaced by Almanbet Nuraly.

Bonus awards:

The following fighters will be awarded $10,000 bonuses:

- Fight of the Night: Nursultan Kassymkhanov vs. Alexander Peduson
- Knockout of the Night: Albert Tumenov
- Submission of the Night: Khusein Sheikhaev
- $5000 Stoppage Victory Bonuses: Jose Daniel Toledo, Altynbek Mamashev, Carlos Eduardo, Cory Hendricks, Zharabek Teshebaev, Roggers Souza, Salamu Abdurahmanov

=== Results ===
ACA 102
Weight Class				Method	Round	Time	Notes
Welterweight 77 kg	(Russia) Albert Tumenov (c)	def.	(Russia) Beslan Ushukov	KO (Punch)	2	3:12	For the ACA Welterweight Championship
Middleweight 84 kg	(Russia) Salamu Abdurahmanov (c)	def.	(Russia) Valery Myasnikov	Submission (Neck Crank)	2	3:24	For the ACA Middleweight Championship
Lightweight 70 kg	(Russia) Vener Galiev	def.	(Kazakhstan) Ermek Tlauov	TKO (Punches)	2	1:38	
Middleweight 84 kg	(Poland) Rafał Haratyk	def.	(Russia) Arbi Agujev	TKO (Knee Injury)	1	5:00	
Heavyweight 120 kg	(Brazil) Roggers Souza	def.	(Kazakhstan) Shakhmaral Dzhepisov	TKO (Punches)	2	4:12	
Preliminary Card
Lightweight 70 kg	(Kyrgyzstan) Zharabek Teshebaev	def.	(Russia) Musa Khamanaev	TKO (Knees ans Punches)	2	4:08	
Featherweight 66 kg	(Russia) Adlan Bataev	def.	(Brazil) João Luiz Nogueira	Decision (Unanimous)	3	5:00	
Welterweight 77 kg	(Russia) Chersi Dudaev	def.	(Russia) Alexander Chernov	Decision (Unanimous)	3	5:00	
Bantamweight 61 kg	(Russia) Khusein Sheikhaev	def.	(Kazakhstan) Yerzhan Estanov	Submission (Suloev Stretch)	1	4:12	
Light Heavyweight 93 kg	(United States) Cory Hendricks	def.	(England) Luke Barnatt	Submission (Rear-Naked Choke)	2	4:16	
Featherweight 66 kg	(Kazakhstan) Nursultan Kassymkhanov	def.	(Russia) Alexander Peduson	Decision (Unanimous)	3	5:00	
Light Heavyweight 93 kg	(Brazil) Carlos Eduardo	def.	(Russia) Isa Umarov	Submission (Rear-Naked Choke)	1	2:35	
Bantamweight 61 kg	(Kyrgyzstan) Kanat Keldibekov	def.	(Kazakhstan) Altynbek Dzhumanuly	Decision (Split)	3	5:00	
Welterweight 77 kg	(Kyrgyzstan) Altynbek Mamashev	def.	(Kazakhstan) Goyti Dazaev	TKO (Head Kick and Punches)	1	2:34	
Light Heavyweight 93 kg	(Spain) Jose Daniel Toledo	def.	(Kyrgyzstan) Almanbet Nuraly	TKO (Punches)	2	3:37	
Featherweight 66 kg	(Belarus) Ivan Zhvirblia	def.	(Kazakhstan) Fanil Rafikov	Decision (Unanimous)	3	5:00	

== ACA 103: Yagshimuradov vs. Butorin ==
ACA 103: Yagshimuradov vs. Butorin
- Promotion: Absolute Championship Akhmat
- Date: December 14, 2019
- Venue: TBA
- City: Saint Petersburg, Russia

Absolute Championship Akhmat 103: Yagshimuradov vs. Butorin will be a mixed martial arts event held by Absolute Championship Akhmat on December 14, 2019 in Saint Petersburg, Russia.

=== Background ===
Hacran Dias dropped out of his fight with Yusuf Raisov due to injury. Raimundo Batista served as Dias replacement, takes short notice fight against Raisov.

Bonus awards:

The following fighters were awarded $10,000 bonuses:

- Fight of the Night: Kurban Taigibov vs. Abdul-Rakhman Temirov
- Fight of the Night: Igor Zhirkov vs. Mikhail Malyutin
- Knockout of the Night: Alexander Sarnavskiy
- $5000 Stoppage Victory Bonuses: Rodrigo Praia, Yusuf Raisov, Rustam Kerimov

=== Fight Card ===
ACA 103
Weight Class				Method	Round	Time	Notes
Light Heavyweight 93 kg	(Turkmenistan) Dovletdzhan Yagshimuradov (c)	def.	(Russia) Aleksei Butorin	Decision (Unanimous)	5	5:00	For the ACA Light Heavyweight Championship
Bantamweight 61 kg	(Russia) Rustam Kerimov (c)	def.	(Brazil) Francisco de Lima	TKO (Punches)	1	3:19	For the ACA Bantamweight Championship
Featherweight 66 kg	(Russia) Marat Balaev	def.	(Brazil) Diego Brandão	Decision (Split)	3	5:00	
Bantamweight 61 kg	(Russia) Igor Zhirkov	def.	(Russia) Mikhail Malyutin	Decision (Split)	3	5:00	
Lightweight 70 kg	(Russia) Yusuf Raisov	def.	(Brazil) Raimundo Batista	TKO (Retirement)	1	5:00	
Preliminary Card
Lightweight 70 kg	(Russia) Alexander Sarnavskiy	def.	(Romania) Aurel Pirtea	KO (Punch)	3	0:38	
Featherweight 66 kg	(Russia) Andrey Goncharov	def.	(Russia) Rustam Taldiev	Decision (Unanimous)	3	5:00	
Featherweight 66 kg	(Russia) Kurban Taigibov	def.	(Russia) Abdul-Rakhman Temirov	Decision (Split)	3	5:00	
Flyweight 57 kg	(Russia) Goga Shamatava	def.	(Russia) Alexey Shaposhnikov	Decision (Unanimous)	3	5:00	
Middleweight 84 kg	(United States) Brett Cooper	def.	(Russia) Alexey Efremov	DQ (Illegal Knees)	2	1:01	
Flyweight 57 kg	(Russia) Kurban Gadzhiev	def.	(Brazil) Charles Henrique	Decision (Split)	3	5:00	
Middleweight 84 kg	(Russia) Magomedrasul Gasanov	def.	(Russia) Vyacheslav Babkin	Decision (Unanimous)	3	5:00	
Bantamweight 61 kg	(Brazil) Rodrigo Praia	def.	(Uzbekistan) Firdavs Khasanov	TKO (Punches)	2	3:18	

== See also ==
- 2019 in UFC
- 2019 in Bellator MMA
- 2019 in ONE Championship
- 2019 in M-1 Global
- 2019 in Konfrontacja Sztuk Walki
- 2019 in LUX Fight League
- 2019 in RXF
