= Absolute Championship Akhmat =

MMA, kickboxing and BJJ promoter based in Russia

- Current season, competition or edition: 2026 in Absolute Championship Akhmat
- Sport: Mixed martial arts
- Founded: 2014; 12 years ago
- Founder: Mairbek Khasiev
- President: Magomed Bibulatov
- Country: Russia
- Headquarters: Grozny, Russia
- Website: www.aca-mma.com/en

Absolute Championship Akhmat (ACA), formerly known as Absolute Championship Berkut (ACB), is a Russian mixed martial arts, kickboxing, and Brazilian jiu-jitsu organization and one of the leading promotions in Europe. To date, most events have been hosted in Grozny, Chechnya. ACA has also held events in other Russian cities, as well as in Australia, Austria, Azerbaijan, Belarus, Belgium, Brazil, Canada, China, England, France, Georgia, Germany, Italy, Kazakhstan, the Netherlands, Poland, Romania, Scotland, Slovakia, Tajikistan, Turkey, the United Arab Emirates and the United States.

== History ==
=== Absolute Championship Berkut ===
ACB was founded by Mairbek Khasiev, a resident of Chechnya. In 2009, he founded the Berkut Fight Club in Grozny which helped young fighters get the opportunity to compete at the highest level.

Several fighters who were successful in ACB have gone on to sign with more well known promotions such as the UFC. ACB had its own fight team, the Fight Club Berkut, which consisted of some of the promotion's fighters, such as Beslan Isaev, Magomed Bibulatov, Musa Khamanaev and Aslambek Saidov. ACB co-operated with other promotions in Europe by exchanging fighters, for example KSW and The Cage. ACB ran the majority of its shows live on a variety of TV networks (Match TV, Polsat Sport) throughout Europe. The promotion ran its shows live internationally on its Facebook page.

=== International Expansion ===
The 2017 campaign featured 27 events spanning across thirteen countries, including the United States, Austria, Poland, England, Tajikistan, Belarus, Turkey, Kazakhstan, Canada, Brazil, Germany, Australia and Russia.

=== TECH-Krep FC purchase ===
On September 12, 2018, Mairbek Khasiev revealed that Absolute Championship Berkut had purchased TECH-Krep FC. Khasiev went on to explain that TECH-Krep FC would cease operation and cancel their October 26 event, and that former Tech-Krep FC head Alexey Yatsenko would become the president of ACB.

=== WFCA acquisition and integration ===
On November 28, 2018, the Head of the Chechen Republic Ramzan Kadyrov announced that the Absolute Championship Berkut (ACB) and the World Fighting Championship Akhmat (WFCA) would merge to form a single promotion.

=== US Sanctions ===
On December 20, 2020, the U.S. Department of Treasury announced sanctions against ACA and Akhmat MMA due to their ownership by Kadyrov. Due to this, no American citizen or company can do business with them, meaning all American fighters could face fines or jail time if they fight for the organization. Brett Cooper was the first fighter to pull out of his fight at ACA 116: Froes vs Balaev due to the sanctions.

== Current champions ==
=== Mixed martial arts ===
Division	Champion	Since	Defenses
Heavyweight	(Russia) Alikhan Vakhaev	Nov 7, 2025	1
Light Heavyweight	(Russia) Muslim Magomedov	Dec 5, 2025	0
Middleweight	Vacant	May 25, 2026	-
Welterweight	(Kyrgyzstan) Zhakshylyk Myrzabekov	Dec 5, 2025	0
Lightweight	(Russia) Abdul-Aziz Abdulvakhabov	Sep 19, 2020	4
Featherweight	(Russia) Islam Omarov	Jul 21, 2023	3
Bantamweight	(Brazil) Josiel Silva	Feb 28, 2025	1
Flyweight	(Russia) Anatoliy Kondratiev	Feb 6, 2026	0

== Rankings ==
The rankings for the ACA's fighters are both recorded and updated when information has been obtained from the ACA's website.

- Updated as of Feb 9, 2026

ACA Rankings
Rank	Heavyweight	Light Heavyweight	Middleweight	Welterweight
C	(Russia) Alikhan Vakhaev	(Russia) Muslim Magomedov	(Russia) Magomedrasul Gasanov	(Russia) Abubakar Vagaev
1	(Russia) Kirill Kornilov	(Russia) Adlan Ibragimov	(Russia) Shamil Abdulaev	(Kyrgyzstan) Jakshylyk Myrzabekov ▲2
2	(Iran) Amir Aliakbari	(Russia) Elmar Gasanov	(Russia) Artem Frolov	(Russia) Albert Tumenov ▼1
3	(Russia) Zumso Zuraev	(Russia) Grigor Matevosyan	(Russia) Ramazan Emeev	(Russia) Uzair Abdurakov ▼1
4	(Russia) Adam Bogatyrev	(Russia) Salamu Abdurakhmanov ▲3	(Russia) Abdul-Rahman Dzhanaev	(Russia) Andrei Koshkin
5	(Russia) Anton Vyazigin	(Tajikistan) Faridun Odilov ▼1	(Russia) Ibragim Magomedov	(Russia) Alexey Shurkevich ▲1
6	(United States) Tony Johnson Jr.	(Brazil) Leonardo Silva ▼1	(Bulgaria) Nikola Dipchikov	(Russia) Chersi Dudaev ▼1
7	(Brazil) Carlos Felipe	(Russia) Sulim Batalov ▼1	(Russia) Dmitriy Aryshev	(Brazil) Vinicius Cruz ▲2
8	(Russia) Mukhumat Vakhaev	(Russia) Alexey Butorin	(Brazil) Rene Pessoa	(Belarus) Denis Maher ▼1
9	(Iran) Arash Sadeghi	(Russia) Maxim Grishin	(Russia) Ruslan Shamilov	(Kyrgyzstan) Edil Esengulov ▼1
10	(Russia) Anton Vinnikov	(Kazakhstan) Evgeniy Egemberdiev	(Kazakhstan) Dauren Ermekov ▲2	(Russia) Abdulvakhab Magomadov
11	(Brazil) Klidson Abreu	(Kazakhstan) Asylzhan Bakytzhanuly	(Russia) Murad Abdulaev ▼1	(Tajikistan) Iskandar Mamadaliev
12	(Azerbaijan) Ruslan Medzhidov	(Russia) Vitaly Bigdash ▲3	(Russia) Mikhail Dolgov ▼2	(Brazil) Elias Silvério
13	(Russia) Alexander Maslov	(Brazil) Caio Bittencourt ▼1	(United States) Chris Honeycutt	(Russia) Ivan Solovyov
14	(Estonia) Denis Smoldarev	(Russia) Evgeny Erokhin ▼1	(Russia) Shamil Yamilov	(Russia) Vitaly Slipenko
15	(Russia) Daniil Matsola	(Russia) Ruslan Gabaraev ▼1	(Russia) Vladimir Vasiliev	(Russia) Evgeny Galochkin
Rank	Lightweight	Featherweight	Bantamweight	Flyweight
C	(Russia) Abdul-Aziz Abdulvakhabov	(Russia) Islam Omarov	(Brazil) Josiel Silva	(Russia) Anatoliy Kondratiev
1	(Russia) Ali Bagov	(Russia) Alikhan Suleimanov	(Russia) Oleg Borisov	(Russia) Azamat Pshukov
2	(Russia) Daud Shakhaev	(Russia) Bibert Tumenov	(Russia) Aleksandr Podlesniy	(Russia) Aren Akopyan
3	(Brazil) Herdeson Batista	(Russia) Kurban Taygibov	(Russia) David Dzhibilov	(Tajikistan) Azam Gaforov
4	(Russia) Ali Abdulkhalikov	(Russia) Saifullah Dzhabrailov	(Russia) Renat Ondar ▲5	(Russia) Azamat Kerefov ▲1
5	(Russia) Alexander Matmuratov	(Russia) Makharbek Karginov	(Russia) Timur Valiev ▼1	(Russia) Imran Bukuev ▲1
6	(Kazakhstan) Artem Reznikov	(Kyrgyzstan) Alimardan Abdykaarov	(Russia) Abdul-Rakhman Dudayev ▼1	(Russia) Vartan Asatryan ▲1
7	(Russia) Mukhamed Kokov	(Russia) Dzhambulat Selimkhanov ▲1	(Tajikistan) Osimkhon Rakhmonov ▼1	(Russia) Astemir Nagoev ▲1
8	(Russia) Amirkhan Adaev	(Russia) Rustam Kerimov ▲1	(Russia) Pavel Vitruk ▼1	(Russia) Saigid Abdullayev ▲1
9	(Brazil) Davi Ramos	(Russia) Alexander Grozin	(Russia) Rasul Albaskhanov ▼1	(Russia) Umalat Israfilov ▲1
10	(Russia) Rasul Magomedov	(Russia) Gleb Khabibulin ▲1	(Russia) Hayk Kazaryan ▲3	(Tajikistan) Oyatullo Muminov ▲1
11	(Russia) Ramazan Kishev	(Russia) Roman Ogulchansky	(Russia) Akhmed Musakaev ▼1	(Russia) Murad Zeynulabidov ▲1
12	(Russia) Abdul-Rahman Temirov	(Belarus) Apti Bimarzaev ▼2	(Slovakia) Tomáš Deák	(Uzbekistan) Kholmurod Nurmatov ▲1
13	(United States) Sidney Outlaw	(Peru) Enrique Barzola ▼1	(Russia) Goga Shamatava ▼2	(Armenia) Mkhitar Barseghyan ▲1
14	(Russia) Alexey Polpudnikov ▲1	(Kazakhstan) Bagdos Olzhabay	(Russia) Kurban Gadzhiev	(Kyrgyzstan) Azatbek Kochorov ▲1
15	(Russia) Pavel Gordeev ▼1	(Tajikistan) Behruz Zukhurov	(Russia) Chermen Gobaev	(Russia) Vagiz Ismagilov

== Championship history ==
=== Mixed martial arts ===
==== Heavyweight Championship ====
over 93 kg (over 205 lb)

No.	Name	Event	Date	Reign (total)	Defenses
1	(Russia) Zelimkhan Umiev def. Israfil Makhashev	ACB 9 Grozny, Russia	Jun 22, 2014	594 days	
2	(Russia) Salimgerey Rasulov	ACB 29; Warsaw, Poland	Feb 6, 2016	244 days	
3	(Russia) Denis Goltsov	ACB 50; Saint Petersburg, Russia	Dec 18, 2016	244 days	
4	(Russia) Mukhamad Vakhaev	ACB 67; Grozny, Russia	Aug 19, 2017	742 days	1. def. Sergey Bilostenniy at ACB 90 on Nov 10, 2018
ACB and WFCA merged on November 28, 2018 to become ACA.
Evgeniy Goncharov and Tony Johnson Jr. fought to a no contest at ACA 96, leaving the belt vacated.
5	(Russia) Evgeniy Goncharov def. Tony Johnson Jr.	ACA 97; Krasnodar, Russia	Aug 31, 2019	174 days	
6	(Russia) Mukhamad Vakhaev	ACA 104; Krasnodar, Russia	Feb 21, 2020	? days	
Vakhaev vacated the title in March 2020 when he chose to test the free agency after the end of his contract with ACA.
7	(United States) Tony Johnson Jr. def. Daniel Omielańczuk	ACA 114; Łódź, Poland	Nov 26, 2020	485 days	1. def. Dmitry Poberezhets at ACA 121 on Apr 23, 2021; 2. def. Mukhumat Vakhaev at ACA 132 on Nov 19, 2021
8	(Russia) Salimgerey Rasulov	ACA 138; Grozny, Russia	Mar 26, 2022	154 days	
9	(Russia) Alikhan Vakhaev	ACA 143; Krasnodar, Russia	Aug 27, 2022	202 days	
10	(Russia) Evgeniy Goncharov (2)	ACA 154; Krasnodar, Russia	Mar 17, 2023	781 days	1. def. Anton Vyazigin at ACA 170 on Feb 9, 2024; 2. def. Adam Bogatyrev at ACA 178 on Aug 16, 2024
Goncharov vacated the title on May 6, 2025, after suffering an injury.
10	(Russia) Alikhan Vakhaev (2) def. Kirill Kornilov	ACA 195; Saint Petersburg, Russia	Nov 7, 2025	311 days (incumbent)	1. def. Amir Aliakbari at ACA 206 on Aug 15, 2026

==== Light Heavyweight Championship ====
93 kg (205 lb)

No.	Name	Event	Date	Reign (total)	Defenses
1	(Russia) Gadzhimurad Antigulov def. Ruslan Khaskhanov	ACB 9 Grozny, Russia	Jun 22, 2014	? days	1. def. Muslim Makhmudov at ACB 35 on May 6, 2016
Antigulov vacated the title when he signed for the Ultimate Fighting Championship.
2	(Brazil) Thiago Silva def. Jared Ferguson	ACB 51; Irvine, CA, U.S.	Jan 13, 2017	190 days	
3	(Russia) Batraz Agnaev	ACB 65; Sheffield, England	Jul 22, 2017	287 days	
4	(Turkmenistan) Dovletdzhan Yagshimuradov	ACB 86; Moscow, Russia	May 5, 2018	207 days	
ACB and WFCA merged on November 28, 2018 to become ACA.
5	(Turkmenistan) Dovletdzhan Yagshimuradov def. Karol Celinski	ACA 92; Warsaw, Poland	Feb 16, 2019	675 days	1. def. Alexey Butorin at ACA 103 on Dec 14, 2019
Yagshimuradov vacated the title on December 22, 2020 when he signed for Bellator MMA.
6	(Russia) Muslim Magomedov def. Evgeny Egemberdiev	ACA 126; Sochi, Russia	Jul 16, 2021	874 days	1. def. Grigor Matevosyan at ACA 137 on Mar 6, 2022; 2. def. Oleg Olenichev at ACA 148 on Nov 18, 2022
Magomedov was stripped of the title on December 7, 2022, after failing to make weight for his title defense against Adlan Ibragimov at ACA 167.
7	(Russia) Adlan Ibragimov def. Faridun Odilov	ACA 182; Sochi, Russia	Dec 15, 2024	355 days	
8	(Russia) Muslim Magomedov (2)	ACA 197; Moscow, Russia	Dec 5, 2025	283 days (incumbent)	1. def. Elmar Gasanov at ACA 205 on Jul 17, 2026

==== Middleweight Championship ====
84 kg (185 lb)

No.	Name	Event	Date	Reign (total)	Defenses
1	(Russia) Anatoly Tokov def. Arbi Aguev	ACB 38; Rostov-on-Don, Russia	May 20, 2016	134 days	
Tokov vacated the title on October 1, 2016 when he signed for M-1 Global due to a contract dispute.
2	(Russia) Albert Duraev def. Vyacheslav Vasilevsky	ACB 77; Moscow, Russia	Dec 23, 2017	340 days	1. def. Piotr Strus at ACB 89 on Sep 8, 2018
ACB and WFCA merged on November 28, 2018 to become ACA.
3	(Russia) Salamu Abdurakhmanov def. Brett Cooper	ACA 95; Moscow, Russia	Apr 27, 2019	940 days	1. def. Valery Myasnikov at ACA 102 on Nov 29, 2019
—	(Russia) Magomedrasul Gasanov def. Nikola Dipchikov for interim title	ACA 121; Minsk, Belarus	Apr 9, 2021	—	
Abdurakhmanov vacated the title on November 22, 2021, due to health reasons.
4	(Russia) Magomedrasul Gasanov promoted to undisputed champion	–	Nov 22, 2021	1645 days	1. def. Abdul-Rakhman Dzhanaev at ACA 135 on Jan 28, 2022; 2. def. Artem Frolov at ACA 143 on Aug 27, 2022; 3. def. Salamu Abdurakhmanov at ACA 161 on Aug 11, 2023; 4. def. Ibragim Magomedov at ACA 171 on Feb 25, 2024; 5. def. Shamil Abdulaev at ACA 183 on Feb 8, 2025; 6. def. Dmitriy Aryshev at ACA 190 on Aug 15, 2025; 7. def. Albert Tumenov at ACA 200 on Feb 6, 2026
Gasanov vacated the title on May 25, 2026, when he signed with the Ultimate Fighting Championship.

==== Welterweight Championship ====
77 kg (170 lb)

No.	Name	Event	Date	Reign (total)	Defenses
1	(Russia) Albert Duraev def. Ustarmagomed Gadzhidaudov	ACB 22; Saint Petersburg, Russia	Sep 12, 2015	? days	1. def. Michail Tsarev at ACB 35 on May 6, 2016
Duraev was stripped of the title due to him missing weight and his eventual move up to Middleweight.
2	(United States) Brett Cooper def. Aslambek Saidov	ACB 50; Saint Petersburg, Russia	Dec 18, 2016	244 days	
3	(Russia) Mukhamed Berkhamov	ACB 67; Grozny, Russia	Aug 19, 2017	? days	
Berkhamov was stripped of the title after his refusal to accept 3 title defense match ups.
4	(Russia) Albert Tumenov def. Ciro Rodrigues	ACB 89; Krasnodar, Russia	Sep 8, 2018	81 days	
ACB and WFCA merged on November 28, 2018 to become ACA.
5	(Russia) Albert Tumenov def. Murad Abdulaev	ACA 95; Moscow, Russia	Apr 27, 2019	216 days	1. def. Beslan Ushukov at ACA 102 on Nov 29, 2019
Tumenov vacated the title in November 2019 when he chose to test the free agency after the end of his contract with ACA.
6	(Russia) Murad Abdulaev def. Ali Bagov	ACA 110; Moscow, Russia	Sep 5, 2020	174 days	
7	(Russia) Abubakar Vagaev	ACA 118; Moscow, Russia	Feb 26, 2021	658 days	1. def. Ustarmagomed Gadzhidaudov at ACA 138 on Mar 26, 2022
8	(Russia) Vitaly Slipenko	ACA 149; Moscow, Russia	Dec 16, 2022	217 days	
9	(Russia) Ustarmagomed Gadzhidaudov	ACA 160; Sochi, Russia	Jul 21, 2023	156 days	
10	(Russia) Albert Tumenov (2)	ACA 168; Moscow, Russia	Dec 24, 2023	412 days	
11	(Russia) Abubakar Vagaev (2)	ACA 183; Krasnodar, Russia	Feb 8, 2025	413 days	
–	(Kyrgyzstan) Zhakshylyk Myrzabekov def. Uzair Abdurakov for interim title	ACA 197; Moscow, Russia	Dec 5, 2025	–	
Vagaev vacated the title on March 27, 2026, when he signed with the Ultimate Fighting Championship.
12	(Kyrgyzstan) Zhakshylyk Myrzabekov promoted to undisputed champion	–	Mar 27, 2026	171 days (incumbent)	

==== Lightweight Championship ====
70 kg (155 lb)

No.	Name	Event	Date	Reign (total)	Defenses
1	(Russia) Abdul-Aziz Abdulvakhabov def. Ali Bagov	ACB 9 Grozny, Russia	Jun 22, 2014	1539 days	1. def. Eduard Vartanyan at ACB 32 on Mar 26, 2016; 2. def. Ali Bagov at ACB 48 on Oct 22, 2016; 3. def. interim champion Eduard Vartanyan at ACB 77 on Dec 23, 2017
—	(Russia) Eduard Vartanyan def. Andrey Koshkin for interim title	ACB 71; Moscow, Russia	Sep 30, 2017	—	
2	(Russia) Ali Bagov	ACB 89; Krasnodar, Russia	Sep 8, 2018	81 days	
ACB and WFCA merged on November 28, 2018 to become ACA.
3	(Russia) Ali Bagov def. Khuseyn Khaliev	ACA 99; Moscow, Russia	Sep 27, 2019	109 days	
Bagov vacated the title on January 14, 2020, when he moved up to welterweight.
4	(Russia) Abdul-Aziz Abdulvakhabov (2) def. Alexander Sarnavskiy	ACA 111; Moscow, Russia	Sep 19, 2020	2030 days	1. def. Hacran Dias at ACA 131 on Nov 5, 2021; 2. def. interim champion Mukhamed Kokov at ACA 164 on Oct 4, 2023; 3. def. Ali Abdulkhalikov at ACA 182 on Dec 14, 2024; 4. def. Ali Bagov at ACA 189 on Jul 11, 2025
—	(Russia) Mukhamed Kokov def. Hacran Dias for interim title	ACA 154; Krasnodar, Russia	Mar 17, 2023	—	
–	(Russia) Daud Shaikhaev def. Herdeson Batista for interim title	ACA 198; Grozny, Russia	Jan 9, 2026	–	
Abdulvakhabov vacated the title on April 11, 2026, when he moved up to welterweight.
5	(Russia) Daud Shaikhaev promoted to undisputed champion	–	Apr 11, 2026	156 days (incumbent)	

==== Featherweight Championship ====
66 kg (145 lb)

No.	Name	Event	Date	Reign (total)	Defenses
1	(Russia) Zabit Magomedsharipov def. Sheikh-Magomed Arapkhanov	ACB 31; Grozny, Russia	Mar 29, 2016	137 days	1. def. Valdines Silva at ACB 45 on September 17, 2016
Magomedsharipov vacated the title on May 4, 2017 when he signed for the Ultimate Fighting Championship.
2	(Russia) Marat Balaev def. Yusuf Raisov	ACB 50; Saint Petersburg, Russia	Dec 18, 2016	503 days	1. def. Adlan Bataev at ACB 61 on May 20, 2017
—	(Russia) Yusuf Raisov def. Alexander Peduson for interim title	ACB 77; Moscow, Russia	Dec 23, 2017	—	
3	(Russia) Yusuf Raisov	ACB 86; Moscow, Russia	May 5, 2018	207 days	
ACB and WFCA merged on November 28, 2018 to become ACA.
4	(Russia) Salman Zhamaldaev def. Marat Balaev	ACA 93; Saint Petersburg, Russia	Mar 16, 2019	202 days	
5	(Brazil) Felipe Froes	ACA 100; Grozny, Russia	Oct 4, 2019	539 days	
Froes was stripped of the title on March 26, 2021 after failing to make weight for his title defense against Magomedrasul Khasbulaev at ACA 120.
6	(Russia) Magomedrasul Khasbulaev def. Felipe Froes	ACA 120; Saint Petersburg, Russia	Mar 26, 2021	602 days	1. def. Ramazan Kishev at ACA 131 on Nov 5, 2021
—	(Russia) Alikhan Suleymanov def. Felipe Froes for interim title	AC1 141; Sochi, Russia	Jul 22, 2022	—	
Khasbulaev was stripped of the title on November 18, 2022, after he has sustained an injury of three bouts against interim champion Alikhan Suleymanov.
7	(Russia) Alikhan Suleymanov promoted to undisputed champion	–	Nov 18, 2022	235 days	
8	(Russia) Islam Omarov	ACA 160; Moscow, Russia	Jul 21, 2023	1151 days (incumbent)	1. def. Alexey Polpudnikov at ACA 171 on Feb 25, 2024; 2. def. Kurban Taygibov at ACA 179 on Sep 8, 2024; 3. def. Alikhan Suleymanov at ACA 198 on Jan 9, 2026

==== Bantamweight Championship ====
61 kg (135 lb)

No.	Name	Event	Date	Reign (total)	Defense
1	(Russia) Magomed Magomedov def. Petr Yan	ACB 32; Moscow, Russia	Mar 26, 2016	385 days	1. def. Oleg Borisov at ACB 50 on Dec 18, 2016
2	(Russia) Petr Yan	ACB 57; Moscow, Russia	Apr 15, 2017	290 days	1. def. Matheus Mattos at ACB 71 on Sep 30, 2017
Yan vacated the title on January 30, 2018 when he signed for the Ultimate Fighting Championship.
3	(Russia) Rustam Kerimov def. Oleg Borisov	ACB 83; Baku, Azerbaijan	Mar 24, 2018	249 days	
ACB and WFCA merged on November 28, 2018 to become ACA.
4	(Russia) Rustam Kerimov def. Abdul-Rakhman Dudaev	ACA 93; Saint Petersburg, Russia	Mar 16, 2019	? days	1. def. Francisco Maciel at ACA 103 on Dec 14, 2019
Kerimov vacated the title in December 2019 when he chose to test the free agency after the end of his contract with ACA.
5	(Brazil) Daniel Oliveira def. Shamil Shakhbulatov	ACA 105; Almaty, Kazakhstan	Mar 6, 2020	385 days	1. def. Abdul-Rakhman Dudaev at ACA 112 on Oct 4, 2020
6	(Russia) Magomed Bibulatov	ACA 120; Saint Petersburg, Russia	Mar 26, 2021	365 days	
7	(Russia) Oleg Borisov	ACA 138; Grozny, Russia	Mar 26, 2022	755 days	1. def. Rustam Kerimov at ACA 154 on Mar 17, 2023
8	(Ukraine) Pavel Vitruk	ACA 174; Saint Petersburg, Russia	Apr 19, 2024	315 days	
9	(Brazil) Josiel Silva	ACA 184; Moscow, Russia	Feb 28, 2025	563 days (incumbent)	1. def. Oleg Borisov at ACA 196 on Nov 23, 2025; NC. vs. Alexander Podlesniy at ACA 201 on Mar 27, 2026; 2. def. Renat Ondar at ACA 205 on Jul 17, 2026

==== Flyweight Championship ====
57 kg (125 lb)

No.	Name	Event	Date	Reign (total)	Defense
1	(Russia) Askar Askarov def. José Maria Tomé	ACB 48; Moscow, Russia	Oct 22, 2016	767 days	1. def. Anthony Leone at ACB 58 on Apr 22, 2017; 2. def. Rasul Albaskhanov at ACB 86 on May 5, 2018
ACB and WFCA merged on November 28, 2018 to become ACA.
2	(Russia) Yunus Evloev def. Josiel Silva	ACA 95; Moscow, Russia	Apr 27, 2019	? days	1. def. Azam Gaforov at ACA 99 on Sep 27, 2019
Evloev vacated the title in December 2019 for health reasons.
3	(Russia) Azamat Kerefov def. Mansur Khatuev	ACA 104; Krasnodar, Russia	Feb 21, 2020	597 days	1. def. Kurban Gadzhiev at ACA 113 on Nov 6, 2020; 2. def. Rasul Albaskhanov at ACB 127 on Aug 28, 2021
Kerefov vacated the title on October 10, 2021 when he chose to test the free agency.
4	(Russia) Imran Bukuev def. Aren Akopyan	ACA 136; Moscow, Russia	Feb 26, 2022	364 days	
5	(Russia) Kurban Gadzhiev	ACA 152; Grozny, Russia	Feb 25, 2023	854 days	1. def. Azam Gaforov at ACA 180 on Oct 4, 2024
6	(Russia) Azamat Pshukov	ACA 188; Sochi, Russia	Jun 28, 2025	223 days	
7	(Russia) Anatoliy Kondratyev	ACA 200; Moscow, Russia	Feb 6, 2026	220 days (incumbent)	

=== Kickboxing ===
==== Heavyweight Championship ====
120 kg (265 lb)

No.	Name	Event	Date	Defenses
Current	(Ukraine) Tsotne Rogava	ACB KB 15; Moscow, Russia	April 20, 2018	
1	(Brazil) Jhonata Diniz def. Kirk Krouba	ACB KB 6 Brussels, Belgium	June 5, 2016	

==== Middleweight Championship ====
84 kg (185 lb)

No.	Name	Event	Date	Defenses
Current	(Russia) Artem Levin def. Igor Bugaenko	ACB KB 15; Moscow, Russia	April 20, 2018	

==== Welterweight Championship ====
77 kg (170 lb)

No.	Name	Event	Date	Defenses
Current	(Azerbaijan) Parviz Abdullayev def. Islam Baibatyrov	ACB KB 15; Moscow, Russia	April 20, 2018	

=== Brazilian jiu-jitsu ===
==== GI Heavyweight Championship ====
120 kg (265 lb)

No.	Name	Event	Date	Defenses
Current	(Brazil) Marcus Almeida	ACB JJ 13 (United States) Long Beach, United States	May 5, 2018	
2	(Brazil) João Gabriel Rocha	ACB JJ 10; São Paulo, Brazil	January 26, 2018	
1	(Brazil) Luiz Panza def. Alexander Trans	ACB JJ 5 Warsaw, Poland	June 22, 2014	

==== GI Light Heavyweight Championship ====
95 kg (209 lb)

No.	Name	Event	Date	Defenses
Current	(Brazil) Felipe Pena def. Adam Wardziński	ACB JJ 12; Almaty, Kazakhstan	April 14, 2018	

==== GI Middleweight Championship ====
85 kg (187 lb)

No.	Name	Event	Date	Defenses
Current	(Brazil) Leandro Lo def. Gabriel Arges	ACB JJ 13 (United States) Long Beach, United States	May 5, 2018	

==== GI Welterweight Championship ====
75 kg (165 lb)

No.	Name	Event	Date	Defenses
Current	(Brazil) Lucas Lepri	ACB JJ 14; Moscow, Russia	June 30, 2018	
1	(Brazil) Davi Ramos def. Edwin Najmi	ACB JJ 11; Badalona, Spain	March 3, 2018	

==== GI Lightweight Championship ====
65 kg (143 lbs)

No.	Name	Event	Date	Defenses
Current	(Brazil) Paulo Miyao def. Augusto Mendes	ACB JJ 10; São Paulo, Brazil	January 26, 2018	1. def. Osvaldo Moizinho at ACB JJ 12 on April 14, 2018 in Almaty, Kazakhstan

==== GI Featherweight Championship ====
60 kg (132 lbs)

No.	Name	Event	Date	Defenses
Current	(Brazil) João Miyao def. Samir Chantre	ACB JJ 12; Almaty, Kazakhstan	April 14, 2018	1. def. Ary Farias at ACB JJ 14 on June 30, 2018 in Moscow, Russia

== Grand Prix champions ==
Event	Date	Division	Winner	Runner-up
ACB 22	Sep 12, 2015	Lightweight	(Russia) Ali Bagov	(Russia) Eduard Vartanyan
ACB 22	Sep 12, 2015	Welterweight	(Russia) Albert Duraev	(Russia) Ustarmagomed Gadzhidaudov
ACB 24	Oct 24, 2015	Light Heavyweight	(Russia) Muslim Makhmudov	(Russia) Husein Kushagov
ACB 24	Oct 24, 2015	Bantamweight	(Russia) Petr Yan	(Russia) Murad Kalamov
ACB 24	Oct 24, 2015	Heavyweight	(Russia) Salimgerey Rasulov	(Poland) Michał Andryszak
ACB 24	Oct 24, 2015	Featherweight	(Russia) Zabit Magomedsharipov	(Russia) Abdul-Rakhman Temirov
ACB 26	Nov 28, 2015	Flyweight	(Russia) Velimurad Alkhasov	(Ukraine) Ruslan Abiltarov
ACB 38	May 20, 2016	Middleweight	(Russia) Anatoly Tokov	(Russia) Arbi Aguev
ACA 159	Jun 16, 2023	Lightweight	(Russia) Eduard Vartanyan	(Kazakhstan) Artem Reznikov
ACA 178	Aug 10, 2024	Heavyweight	(Russia)	(Russia)

== Notable fighters ==
=== Mixed martial arts ===
- (Kazakhstan) Kairat Akhmetov
- (Iran) Amir Aliakbari
- (Australia) Ben Alloway
- (Brazil) Saul Almeida
- (New Zealand) Dylan Andrews
- (Russia) Gadzhimurad Antigulov
- (England) Scott Askham
- (Sweden) Niklas Bäckström
- (England) Luke Barnatt
- (Russia) Magomed Bibulatov
- (United States) E. J. Brooks
- (United States) Paul Buentello
- (United States) Nah-Shon Burrell
- (United States) Chris Camozzi
- (United States) Steve Carl
- (United States) Dan Charles
- (Denmark) Joachim Christensen
- (United States) Brett Cooper
- (Brazil) Carlos Eduardo
- (United States) Rob Emerson
- (Mexico) Efraín Escudero
- (Brazil) Gustavo Falciroli
- (United States) Christos Giagos
- (United States) Fernando Gonzalez
- (United States) Chase Gormley
- (Lithuania) Sergej Grecicho
- (England) Mike Grundy
- (Poland) Piotr Hallmann
- (United States) Pat Healy
- (Poland) Marcin Held
- (United States) Bubba Jenkins
- (Armenia) Georgi Karakhanyan
- (Poland) Mamed Khalidov
- (Russia) Magomedrasul Khasbulaev
- (United States) Mike Kyle
- (United States) Anthony Leone
- (Russia) Artem Lobov
- (Russia) Murad Machaev
- (Iran) Reza Madadi
- (Brazil) Leonardo Mafra
- (Brazil) Vinny Magalhães
- (Russia) Zabit Magomedsharipov
- (England) John Maguire
- (United States) Zach Makovsky
- (United States) Nick Mamalis
- (United States) Alonzo Martinez
- (United States) Danny Martinez
- (Russia) Rasul Mirzaev
- (United States) David Mitchell
- (Japan) Takeya Mizugaki
- (Brazil) Luis Alberto Nogueira
- (Poland) Daniel Omielańczuk
- (Peru) Luis Palomino
- (Northern Ireland) Norman Parke
- (United States) Nam Phan
- (Canada) Jesse Ronson
- (United States) Donald Sanchez
- (Brazil) André Santos
- (Brazil) Daniel Sarafian
- (Russia) Alexander Sarnavskiy
- (Brazil) Fábio Silva
- (Brazil) Leandro Silva
- (Brazil) Thiago Silva
- (Germany) Dennis Siver
- (United States) Clifford Starks
- (Armenia) Akop Stepanyan
- (Netherlands) Hans Stringer
- (Japan) Michinori Tanaka
- (Cape Verde) Luis Tavares
- (Brazil) Thiago Tavares
- (United States) Jesse Taylor
- (Russia) Michail Tsarev
- (Russia) Albert Tumenov
- (Russia) Vyacheslav Vasilevsky
- (Brazil) Rodolfo Vieira
- (Brazil) Marcos Vinicius
- (United States) Rodney Wallace
- (Scotland) Robert Whiteford
- (England) Mike Wilkinson
- (England) Andre Winner
- (Russia) Petr Yan

=== Kickboxing ===
- (Romania) Benjamin Adegbuyi
- (Belarus) Chingiz Allazov
- (Russia) Dzhabar Askerov
- (Belgium) Jamal Ben Saddik
- (Belarus) Yuri Bessmertny
- (Belarus) Igor Bugaenko
- (Suriname) Redouan Cairo
- (Russia) Mikhail Chalykh
- (Romania) Sebastian Ciobanu
- (Morocco) Hicham El Gaoui
- (France) Freddy Kemayo
- (Germany) Enriko Kehl
- (Netherlands) Albert Kraus
- (Russia) Artem Levin
- (Belgium) Alka Matewa
- (Ukraine) Tsotne Rogava
- (Thailand) Sitthichai Sitsongpeenong
- (Russia) Alexander Stetsurenko
- (Netherlands) Warren Stevelmans
- (Romania) Sorin Tănăsie
- (Cape Verde) Luis Tavares
- (Russia) Vlad Tuinov

=== Brazilian jiu-jitsu/Grappling ===
- (Brazil) Marcus Almeida
- (Brazil) Romulo Barral
- (Brazil) Yan Cabral
- (Brazil) Claudio Calasans
- (United States) Keenan Cornelius
- (Brazil) Braulio Estima
- (Brazil) Michael Langhi
- (Brazil) Lucas Lepri
- (Brazil) Leandro Lo
- (Brazil) Vinny Magalhães
- (Brazil) Augusto Mendes
- (Brazil) Paulo Miyao
- (Brazil) Marcos Oliveira
- (Brazil) Felipe Pena
- (Brazil) Jackson Sousa
- (Brazil) Otávio Souza
- (Brazil) Léo Vieira
- (Brazil) Rodolfo Vieira
- (United States) Gordon Ryan
- (Armenia) Arman Tsarukyan

== See also ==
- List of current ACA fighters
- 2014 in Absolute Championship Berkut
- 2015 in Absolute Championship Berkut
- 2016 in Absolute Championship Berkut
- 2017 in Absolute Championship Berkut
- 2018 in Absolute Championship Berkut
- 2019 in Absolute Championship Akhmat
- 2020 in Absolute Championship Akhmat
- 2021 in Absolute Championship Akhmat
- 2022 in Absolute Championship Akhmat
- 2023 in Absolute Championship Akhmat
- 2024 in Absolute Championship Akhmat
- 2025 in Absolute Championship Akhmat
