= List of Absolute Championship Akhmat events =

This is a list of events held and scheduled by the Absolute Championship Akhmat (ACA), a mixed martial arts promotion based in Russia.

== Mixed martial arts ==
| # | Event | Date | Venue | Location |
|---|---|---|---|---|
| 185 | ACA 175: Gordeev vs. Damkovskiy | May 17, 2024 | Irina Viner-Usmanova Gymnastics Palace | Moscow, Russia |
| 184 | ACA 174: Borisov vs. Vitruk | April 19, 2024 | Sibur Arena | Saint Petersburg, Russia |
| 183 | ACA 173: Frolov vs. Yankovsky | March 29, 2024 | Falcon Club Arena | Minsk, Belarus |
| 182 | ACA 172: Esengulov vs. Vagaev | March 9, 2024 | Irina Viner-Usmanova Gymnastics Palace | Moscow, Russia |
| 181 | ACA 171: Omarov vs. Polpudnikov | February 25, 2024 | Basket-Hall Krasnodar | Krasnodar, Russia |
| 180 | ACA 170: Goncharov vs. Vyazigin 2 | February 9, 2024 | Irina Viner-Usmanova Gymnastics Palace | Moscow, Russia |
| 179 | ACA 169: Bibulatov vs. Deák | January 26, 2024 | Sports Hall Coliseum | Grozny, Russia |
| 178 | ACA 168: Gadzhidaudov vs. Tumenov | December 24, 2023 | CSKA Arena | Moscow, Russia |
| 177 | ACA 167: Baidulaev vs. Dias | December 8, 2023 | Ufa Arena | Ufa, Russia |
| 176 | ACA 166: Magomedov vs. Dolgov | November 24, 2023 | Sibur Arena | Saint Petersburg, Russia |
| 175 | ACA 165: Dakaev vs. Batista | November 3, 2023 | Sibur Arena | Saint Petersburg, Russia |
| 174 | ACA 164: Abdulvakhabov vs. Kokov | October 4, 2023 | Sports Hall Coliseum | Grozny, Russia |
| 173 | ACA 163: Mamashov vs. Kolodko | September 22, 2023 | Falcon Club Arena | Minsk, Belarus |
| 172 | ACA 162: Tumenov vs. Palmer | September 2, 2023 | Basket-Hall Krasnodar | Krasnodar, Russia |
| 171 | ACA 161: Gasanov vs. Abdurakhmanov | August 11, 2023 | Irina Viner-Usmanova Gymnastics Palace | Moscow, Russia |
| 170 | ACA 160: Slipenko vs. Gadzhidaudov | July 21, 2023 | CSKA Arena | Moscow, Russia |
| 169 | ACA 159: Vartanyan vs. Reznikov | June 16, 2023 | Bolshoy Ice Dome | Sochi, Russia |
| 168 | ACA 158: Mokhnatkin vs. Olenichev | June 2, 2023 | Sibur Arena | Saint Petersburg, Russia |
| 167 | ACA 157: Frolov vs. Abdulaev | May 19, 2023 | TatNeft Arena | Kazan, Russia |
| 166 | ACA 156: Koshkin vs. Boyko | April 28, 2023 | CSKA Arena | Moscow, Russia |
| 165 | ACA 155: Karginov vs. Silva | April 9, 2023 | Falcon Club Arena | Minsk, Belarus |
| 164 | ACA 154: Vakhaev vs. Goncharov | March 17, 2023 | Basket-Hall Krasnodar | Krasnodar, Russia |
| 163 | ACA 153: Dzhanaev vs. Pessoa | March 9, 2023 | CSKA Arena | Moscow, Russia |
| 162 | ACA 152: Bukuev vs. Gadzhiev | February 25, 2023 | Sports Hall Coliseum | Grozny, Russia |
| 161 | ACA 151: Abiltarov vs. Gomes | January 27, 2023 | TatNeft Arena | Kazan, Russia |
| 160 | ACA 150: Koshkin vs. Reznikov | December 23, 2022 | CSKA Arena | Moscow, Russia |
| 159 | ACA 149: Vagaev vs Slipenko | December 16, 2022 | CSKA Arena | Moscow, Russia |
| 158 | ACA 148: Magomedov vs Olenichev | November 18, 2022 | Bolshoy Ice Dome | Sochi, Russia |
| 157 | ACA 147: Vartanyan vs Raisov | November 4, 2022 | CSKA Arena | Moscow, Russia |
| 156 | ACA 146: Abdurahmanov vs. Pessoa | October 4, 2022 | Sports Hall Coliseum | Grozny, Russia |
| 155 | ACA 145: Abdulaev vs. Slipenko | September 23, 2022 | Sibur Arena | Saint Petersburg, Russia |
| 154 | ACA 144: Nemchinov vs Dipchikov | September 9, 2022 | Falcon Club Arena | Minsk, Belarus |
| 153 | ACA 143: Gasanov vs Frolov | August 27, 2022 | TatNeft Arena | Krasnodar, Russia |
| 152 | ACA 142: Gadzhidaudov vs Amagov | August 13, 2022 | TatNeft Arena | Kazan, Russia |
| 151 | ACA 141: Khasbulaev vs. Suleymanov | July 22, 2022 | Bolshoy Ice Dome | Sochi, Russia |
| 150 | ACA 140: Ramos vs. Reznikov | June 17, 2022 | WOW Arena | Sochi, Russia |
| 149 | ACA 139: Vartanyan vs. Ilunga | May 21, 2022 | CSKA Arena | Moscow, Russia |
| 148 | ACA 138: Vagaev vs Gadzhidaudov | March 27, 2022 | Sports Hall Coliseum | Grozny, Russia |
| 147 | ACA 137: Magomedov vs. Matevosyan | March 6, 2022 | Basket-Hall Krasnodar | Krasnodar, Russia |
| 146 | ACA 136: Bukuev vs Akopyan | February 26, 2022 | CSKA Arena | Moscow, Russia |
| 145 | ACA 135: Gasanov vs. Dzhanaev | January 28, 2022 | Sports Hall Coliseum | Grozny, Russia |
| 144 | ACA 134: Bagov vs. Koshkin | December 17, 2021 | Basket-Hall Krasnodar | Krasnodar, Russia |
| 143 | ACA 133: Magomedov vs. Matevosyan | December 4, 2021 | Sibur Arena | Saint Petersburg, Russia |
| 142 | ACA 132: Johnson vs. Vakhaev | November 18, 2021 | Falcon Arena | Minsk, Belarus |
| 141 | ACA 131: Abdulvakhabov vs. Dias | November 5, 2021 | Sports Hall Coliseum | Moscow, Russia |
| 140 | ACA 130: Dudaev vs. Praia | October 4, 2021 | Sports Hall Coliseum | Grozny, Russia |
| 139 | ACA 129: Sarnavskiy VS. Magomedov | September 24, 2021 | Dynamo Palace of Sports | Moscow, Russia |
| 138 | ACA 128: Goncharov vs. Omielańczuk | September 11, 2021 | Falcon Arena | Minsk, Belarus |
| 137 | ACA 127: Kerefov vs. Albaskhanov | August 28, 2021 | Basket-Hall Krasnodar | Krasnodar, Russia |
| 136 | ACA 126: Magomedov vs. Egemberdiev | July 16, 2021 | Bolshoy Ice Dome | Sochi, Russia |
| 135 | ACA 125: Dudaev vs. de Lima | June 29, 2021 | Bolshoy Ice Dome | Sochi, Russia |
| 134 | ACA 124: Galiev vs. Batista | June 11, 2021 | TatNeft Arena | Kazan, Russia |
| 133 | ACA 123: Koshkin vs. Butenko | May 28, 2021 | CSKA Arena | Moscow, Russia |
| 132 | ACA 122: Johnson vs. Poberezhets | April 23, 2021 | Falcon Arena | Minsk, Belarus |
| 131 | ACA 121: Dipchikov vs. Gasanov | April 9, 2021 | Falcon Arena | Minsk, Belarus |
| 130 | ACA 120: Oliveira vs. Bibulatov | March 26, 2021 | Sibur Arena | Saint Petersburg, Russia |
| 129 | ACA 119: Frolov vs. da Silva | March 12, 2021 | Basket-Hall Krasnodar | Krasnodar, Russia |
| 128 | ACA 118: Abdulaev vs. Vagaev 2 | February 26, 2021 | Basket Hall Moscow | Moscow, Russia |
| 127 | ACA 117: Bagov vs. Silvério | February 12, 2021 | WOW Arena | Sochi, Russia |
| 126 | ACA 118: Abdulaev vs. Vagaev 2 | February 26, 2021 | Basket Hall Moscow | Moscow, Russia |
| 125 | ACA 117: Bagov vs. Silvério | February 12, 2021 | WOW Arena | Krasnaya Polyana, Russia |
| 124 | ACA 116: Froes vs Balaev | December 18, 2020 | VTB Arena | Moscow, Russia |
| 123 | ACA 115: Magomed Ismailov vs. Shtyrkov | December 12, 2020 | VTB Arena | Moscow, Russia |
| 122 | ACA 114: Omielańczuk vs. Johnson | November 26, 2020 | DoubleTree by Hilton Hotel Łódź | Łódź, Poland |
| 121 | ACA 113: Kerefov vs. Gadzhiev | November 11, 2020 | VTB Arena | Moscow, Russia |
| 120 | ACA 112: Oliveira vs. Dudaev | October 4, 2020 | Sports Hall Coliseum | Grozny, Russia |
| 119 | ACA 111: Sarnavskiy vs. Abdulvakhabov | September 19, 2020 | Krylatskoye Sports Palace | Moscow, Russia |
| 118 | ACA 110: Abdulaev vs. Bagov | September 5, 2020 | Krylatskoye Sports Palace | Moscow, Russia |
| 117 | ACA 109: Strus vs. Haratyk | August 20, 2020 | DoubleTree by Hilton Hotel Łódź | Łódź, Poland |
| 116 | ACA 108: Galiev vs. Adaev | August 8, 2020 | Sports Hall Coliseum | Grozny, Russia |
| 115 | ACA 107: Emelianenko vs. Ismailov | July 24, 2020 | VTB Arena | Moscow, Russia |
| 114 | ACA 106: Frolov vs. Magomedov | July 11, 2020 | Sibur Arena | Saint Petersburg, Russia |
| 113 | ACA 105: Shakhbulatov vs. Oliveira | March 6, 2020 | Almaty Arena | Almaty, Kazakhstan |
| 112 | ACA 104: Goncharov vs. Vakhaev | February 21, 2020 | Basket-Hall | Krasnodar, Russia |
| 111 | ACA 103: Yagshimuradov vs. Butorin | December 14, 2019 | Sibur Arena | Saint Petersburg, Russia |
| 110 | ACA 102: Tumenov vs. Ushukov | November 29, 2019 | Almaty Arena | Almaty, Kazakhstan |
| 109 | ACA 101: Strus vs. Nemchinov | November 15, 2019 | Expo XXI | Warsaw, Poland |
| 108 | ACA 100: Zhamaldaev vs. Froes 2 | October 4, 2019 | Sports Hall Coliseum | Grozny, Russia |
| 107 | ACA 99: Bagnov vs. Khaliev | September 27, 2019 | VTB Arena | Moscow, Russia |
| 106 | ACA 98: Khazhirokov vs. Henrique | August 31, 2019 | Basket-Hall | Krasnodar, Russia |
| 105 | ACA 97: Goncharov vs. Johnson | August 31, 2019 | Basket-Hall | Krasnodar, Russia |
| 104 | ACA 96: Goncharov vs. Johnson | June 8, 2019 | Łódź Sport Arena | Łódź, Poland |
| 103 | ACA 95: Tumenov vs. Abdulaev | April 27, 2019 | VTB Ice Palace | Moscow, Russia |
| 102 | ACA 94: Bagov vs. Khaliev | March 30, 2019 | Basket-Hall | Krasnodar, Russia |
| 101 | ACA 93: Balaev vs. Zhamaldaev | March 16, 2019 | Sibur Arena | Saint Petersburg, Russia |
| 100 | ACA 92: Yagshimuradov vs. Celiński | February 16, 2019 | Hala Torwar | Warsaw, Poland |
| 99 | ACA 91: Agujev vs. Silvério | January 26, 2019 | Sports Hall Coliseum | Grozny, Russia |
| 98 | ACB 90: Vakhaev vs. Aliakbari | November 10, 2018 | VTB Ice Palace | Moscow, Russia |
| 97 | ACB 89: Abdulvakhabov vs. Bagov 3 | September 8, 2018 | Basket-Hall | Krasnodar, Russia |
| 96 | ACB 88: Barnatt vs. Celinski | June 16, 2018 | Sleeman Sports Complex | Brisbane, Queensland, Australia |
| 95 | ACB 87: Mousah vs. Whiteford | May 19, 2018 | Motorpoint Arena | Nottingham, England |
| 94 | ACB 86: Balaev vs. Raisov 2 | May 5, 2018 | Olimpiyskiy | Moscow, Russia |
| 93 | ACB 85: Leone vs. Ginazov | April 21, 2018 | RDS Stadium | Rimini, Italy |
| 92 | ACB 84: Agujev vs. Burrell | April 7, 2018 | Ondrej Nepela Arena | Bratislava, Slovakia |
| 91 | ACB 83: Borisov vs. Kerimov | March 24, 2018 | Serhedchi Olympic Sport Centre | Baku, Azerbaijan |
| 90 | ACB 82: Silva vs. Kolobegov | March 9, 2018 | Club Hebraica | São Paulo, Brazil |
| 89 | ACB 81: Saidov vs. Carneiro | February 23, 2018 | The Dome - Dubai Sports City | (United Arab Emirates) Dubai, UAE |
| 88 | ACB 80: Tumenov vs. Burrell | February 16, 2018 | Basket-Hall | Krasnodar, Russia |
| 87 | ACB 79: Aguev vs. Alfaya | January 27, 2018 | Sports Hall Coliseum | Grozny, Russia |
| 86 | ACB 78: Young Eagles 24 | January 13, 2018 | Sports Hall Coliseum | Grozny, Russia |
| 85 | ACB 77: Abdulvakhabov vs. Vartanyan 2 | December 16, 2017 | Luzhniki Palace of Sports | Moscow, Russia |
| 84 | ACB 76: Young Eagles 23 | December 9, 2017 | Gold Coast Convention and Exhibition Centre | Gold Coast, Queensland, Australia |
| 83 | ACB 75: Gadzhidaudov vs. Zieliński | November 25, 2017 | Carl Benz Arena | Stuttgart, Germany |
| 82 | ACB 74: Aguev vs. Townsend | November 18, 2017 | Wiener Stadthalle | Vienna, Austria |
| 81 | ACB 73: Silva vs. Makoev | October 21, 2017 | Miécimo da Silva Sports Complex | Rio de Janeiro, Brazil |
| 80 | ACB 72: Makovsky vs. Sherbatov | October 14, 2017 | Tohu | Montreal, Quebec, Canada |
| 79 | ACB 71: Yan vs. Mattos | September 30, 2017 | Dynamo Palace of Sports in Krylatskoye | Moscow, Russia |
| 78 | ACB 70: The Battle of Britain | September 23, 2017 | Sheffield Arena | Sheffield, Yorkshire, England |
| 77 | ACB 69: Young Eagles 22 | September 9, 2017 | Almaty Arena | Almaty, Kazakhstan |
| 76 | ACB 68: Young Eagles 21 | August 26, 2017 | Tax Committee Sports Center | Dushanbe, Tajikistan |
| 75 | ACB 67: Cooper vs. Berkhamov | August 19, 2017 | Sports Hall Coliseum | Grozny, Russia |
| 74 | ACB 66: Young Eagles 20 | August 5, 2017 | Sports Hall Coliseum | Grozny, Russia |
| 73 | ACB 65: Silva vs. Agnaev | July 22, 2017 | Sheffield Arena | Sheffield, Yorkshire, England |
| 72 | ACB 64: Young Eagles 19 | July 19, 2017 | Antalya Arena Spor Salonu | Antalya, Turkey |
| 71 | ACB 63: Celiński vs. Magalhaes | July 1, 2017 | Ergo Arena | Gdańsk, Poland |
| 70 | ACB 62: Stepanyan vs. Cruz | June 17, 2017 | KSK "Ekspress" | Rostov-on-Don, Russia |
| 69 | ACB 59: Young Eagles 18 (Note: Originally, the event was to be held on April 29, 2017 at Manege Palace of Sports in Vladikavkaz, Russia.) | May 25, 2017 | Sports Hall Coliseum | Grozny, Russia |
| 68 | ACB 61: Balaev vs. Bataev | May 20, 2017 | Sibur Arena | Saint Petersburg, Russia |
| 67 | ACB 60: Aguev vs. Devent | May 13, 2017 | Hallmann Dome | Vienna, Austria |
| 66 | ACB 58: Young Eagles 17 | April 22, 2017 | Gamid Gamidov Palace of Sports | Khasavyurt, Russia |
| 65 | ACB 57: Payback | April 15, 2017 | Luzhniki Palace of Sports | Moscow, Russia |
| 64 | ACB 56: Young Eagles 16 | April 1, 2017 | Prime hall | Minsk, Belarus |
| 63 | ACB 55: Dushanbe | March 24, 2017 | Tax Committee Sports Center | Dushanbe, Tajikistan |
| 62 | ACB 54: Supersonic | March 11, 2017 | Manchester Arena | Manchester, England |
| 61 | ACB 53: Young Eagles 15 | February 18, 2017 | Hala Urania | Olsztyn, Poland |
| 60 | ACB 52: Another Level of MMA Fighting | January 21, 2017 | Hallmann dome | Vienna, Austria |
| 59 | ACB 51: Silva vs. Torgeson | January 13, 2017 | Bren Events Center | (United States) Irvine, California, USA |
| 58 | ACB 50: Stormbringer | December 18, 2016 | Sibur Arena | Saint Petersburg, Russia |
| 57 | ACB 49: Rostov Onslaught | November 26, 2016 | Sport-Don Sports Palace | Rostov-on-Don, Russia |
| 56 | ACB 48: Revenge | October 22, 2016 | Dynamo Palace of Sports in Krylatskoye | Moscow, Russia |
| 55 | ACB 47: Braveheart - Young Eagles 14 | October 1, 2016 | The SSE Hydro | Glasgow, Scotland |
| 54 | ACB 46: Olsztyński Legion - Young Eagles 13 | September 24, 2016 | Hala Urania | Olsztyn, Poland |
| 53 | ACB 45: Siberia vs. Caucasus | September 17, 2016 | Ice Palace | Saint Petersburg, Russia |
| 52 | ACB 44: Young Eagles 12 | September 3, 2016 | Volgograd Arena | Volgograd, Russia |
| 51 | ACB 43: Battle of the Sura | August 20, 2016 | Dizel Arena | Penza, Russia |
| 50 | ACB 42: Young Eagles 11 | August 10, 2016 | Sports Palace "Manezh" | Vladikavkaz, Russia |
| 49 | ACB 41: The Path to Triumph | July 15, 2016 | Adler Arena | Sochi, Russia |
| 48 | ACB 40: Battleground | June 3, 2016 | Sports Palace Olymp | Krasnodar, Russia |
| 47 | ACB 39: Young Eagles 10 | May 28, 2016 | Kristall Ice Sports Palace | Saratov, Russia |
| 46 | ACB 38: Breakthrough | May 20, 2016 | KSK "Ekspress" | Rostov-on-Don, Russia |
| 45 | ACB 37: Young Eagles 9 | May 11, 2016 | Sports Hall Coliseum | Grozny, Russia |
| 44 | ACB 36: Young Eagles 8 | May 10, 2016 | Sports Hall Coliseum | Grozny, Russia |
| 43 | ACB 35: In Memory of Guram Gugenishvili | May 6, 2016 | Tbilisi Sports Palace | (Georgia (country)) Tbilisi, Georgia |
| 42 | ACB 34: Young Eagles 7 | April 29, 2016 | Arena Coliseum | Grozny, Russia |
| 41 | ACB 33: Young Eagles 6 | April 16, 2016 | Arena Coliseum | Grozny, Russia |
| 40 | ACB 32: The Battle of Lions | March 26, 2016 | Dynamo Palace of Sports in Krylatskoye | Moscow, Russia |
| 39 | ACB 31: Magomedsharipov vs. Arapkhanov | March 9, 2016 | Arena Coliseum | Grozny, Russia |
| 38 | ACB 30: Young Eagles 5 | February 20, 2016 | Arena Coliseum | Grozny, Russia |
| 37 | ACB 29: Poland | February 6, 2016 | Hala Torwar | Warsaw, Poland |
| 36 | ACB 28: Young Eagles 4 | December 27, 2015 | Sports Complex "Gladiator", Lenin Plaza | Nalchik, Russia |
| 35 | ACB 27: Tajikistan | December 20, 2015 | Sports Complex "20 Years of Independence" | Dushanbe, Tajikistan |
| 34 | ACB 26: Grand Prix 2015 Finals Stage 3 | November 28, 2015 | Arena Coliseum | Grozny, Russia |
| 33 | ACB 25: Young Eagles 3 | November 7, 2015 | Arena Coliseum | Grozny, Russia |
| 32 | ACB 24: Grand Prix 2015 Finals Stage 2 | October 24, 2015 | Dynamo Palace of Sports in Krylatskoye | Moscow, Russia |
| 31 | ACB 23: Young Eagles 2 | October 10, 2015 | Arena Coliseum | Grozny, Russia |
| 30 | ACB 22: Grand Prix 2015 Finals Stage 1 | September 12, 2015 | Ice Palace | Saint Petersburg, Russia |
| 29 | ACB 21: Young Eagles 1 | August 29, 2015 | Arena Coliseum | Grozny, Russia |
| 28 | ACB 20: Sochi | June 14, 2015 | Bolshoy Ice Dome | Sochi, Russia |
| 27 | ACB 19: Baltic Challenge | May 30, 2015 | Amber Arena | Kaliningrad, Russia |
| 26 | ACB 18: Grand Prix Berkut 2015 Stage 5 | May 23, 2015 | Arena Coliseum | Grozny, Russia |
| 25 | ACB 17: Grand Prix Berkut 2015 Stage 4 | May 2, 2015 | Arena Coliseum | Grozny, Russia |
| 24 | ACB 16: Grand Prix Berkut 2015 Stage 3 | April 17, 2015 | Friendship Arena | Moscow, Russia |
| 23 | ACB 15: Grand Prix Berkut 2015 Stage 2 | March 21, 2015 | Nalchik Sports Complex | Nalchik, Russia |
| 22 | ACB 14: Grand Prix Berkut 2015 Stage 1 | February 28, 2015 | Arena Coliseum | Grozny, Russia |
| 21 | ACB 13: Poland vs. Russia | January 31, 2015 | Orlen Arena | Płock, Poland |
| 20 | M-1 Challenge 54 / ACB 12 | December 17, 2014 | Ice Palace | Saint Petersburg, Russia |
| 19 | ACB 11: Vol. 2 | November 15, 2014 | Arena Coliseum | Grozny, Russia |
| 18 | ACB 11: Vol. 1 | November 14, 2014 | Arena Coliseum | Grozny, Russia |
| 17 | ACB 10: Coliseum Time | October 4, 2014 | Arena Coliseum | Grozny, Russia |
| 16 | ACB 9: Grand Prix Berkut 2014 | June 22, 2014 | Fight club Berkut | Grozny, Russia |
| 15 | ACB 8: Grand Prix Berkut 2014 | May 25, 2014 | Fight club Berkut | Grozny, Russia |
| 14 | ACB 7: Grand Prix Berkut 2014 | May 18, 2014 | Fight club Berkut | Grozny, Russia |
| 13 | ACB 6: Grand Prix Berkut 2014 | April 20, 2014 | Fight club Berkut | Grozny, Russia |
| 12 | ACB 5: Grand Prix Berkut 2014 | April 6, 2014 | Fight club Berkut | Grozny, Russia |
| 11 | ACB 4: Grand Prix Berkut 2014 | March 30, 2014 | Fight club Berkut | Grozny, Russia |
| 10 | ACB 3: Grand Prix Berkut 2014 | March 16, 2014 | Fight club Berkut | Grozny, Russia |
| 9 | ACB 2: Grand Prix Berkut 2014 | March 9, 2014 | Fight club Berkut | Grozny, Russia |
| 8 | ACB 1: Grand Prix Berkut 2014 | March 2, 2014 | Fight club Berkut | Grozny, Russia |
| 7 | Berkut Cup 2013 - Final | May 22, 2013 | Fight club Berkut | Grozny, Russia |
| 6 | Berkut Cup 2013 - 5th Round | April 24, 2013 | Fight club Berkut | Grozny, Russia |
| 5 | Berkut Cup 2013 - 4th Round | April 10, 2013 | Fight club Berkut | Grozny, Russia |
| 4 | Berkut Cup 2013 - 3rd Round | April 3, 2013 | Fight club Berkut | Grozny, Russia |
| 3 | Berkut Cup 2013 - 2nd Round | March 27, 2013 | Fight club Berkut | Grozny, Russia |
| 2 | Berkut Cup 2013 - 1st Round | March 20, 2013 | Fight club Berkut | Grozny, Russia |
| 1 | Berkut Cup - 2012 | October 20, 2012 | Olympic Center | Grozny, Russia |

== Kickboxing ==
| # | Event | Date | Venue | Location |
|---|---|---|---|---|
| 18 | ACA KB 18: Battle of Tolstoy-Yurt | March 2, 2019 | Sports Hall Coliseum | Grozny, Russia |
| 17 | ACB KB 17: Land Of Great Victories | August 5, 2018 | | Pskov, Russia |
| 16 | ACB KB 16: Clash of Titans | July 13, 2018 | | Târgoviște, Romania |
| 15 | ACB KB 15: Grand Prix Kitek | April 20, 2018 | Dynamo Palace of Sports in Krylatskoye | Moscow, Russia |
| 14 | ACB KB 14: Diamonds | March 23, 2018 | Grinn Center | Oryol, Russia |
| 13 | ACB KB 13: From Paris with war | February 24, 2018 | Halle Georges Carpentier | Paris, France |
| 12 | ACB KB 12: Warriors Of Light | November 10, 2017 | Marriott Congress Center | (United States) Los Angeles, USA |
| 11 | ACB KB 11 / Wu Lin Feng | October 7, 2017 | Henan TV Studio 8 | Zhengzhou, China |
| 10 | ACB KB 10: Russia vs. China | July 15, 2017 | Izmailovo Sports Palace | Moscow, Russia |
| 9 | ACB KB 9: Showdown in Paris | March 25, 2017 | Palais des Sports Marcel-Cerdan | Paris, France |
| 8 | ACB KB 8: Only The Braves | October 16, 2016 | Sportcomplex Koning Willem-Alexander | Hoofddorp, Netherlands |
| 7 | ACB KB 7: Bloody Night | September 18, 2016 | Horia Demian Sports Hall | Cluj-Napoca, Romania |
| 6 | ACB KB 6: Battle in Brussels | June 5, 2016 | Sporthal Merchtem | Brussels, Belgium |
| 5 | ACB KB 5: Let's Knock The Winter Out | February 27, 2016 | Grinn Center | Oryol, Russia |
| 4 | ACB KB 4: Grand Prix Final | November 13, 2015 | Sukharev Sport Complex | Perm, Russia |
| 3 | ACB KB 3: Grand Prix Final | October 16, 2015 | Sala Transilvania | Sibiu, Romania |
| 2 | ACB KB 2: Grand Prix Semi-Finals | September 27, 2015 | Vityaz Ice Palace | Anapa, Russia |
| 1 | ACB KB 1: Grand Prix Quarter-Finals | April 25, 2015 | Arena Coliseum | Grozny, Russia |

== Brazilian jiu-jitsu ==
| # | Event | Date | Venue | Location |
|---|---|---|---|---|
| 15 | ACA JJ 15 | 2019 | TBA | TBA |
| 14 | ACB JJ 14: Ramos vs. Lepri | June 30, 2018 | Dynamo Palace of Sports in Krylatskoye | Moscow, Russia |
| 13 | ACB JJ 13: Rocha vs. Almeida | May 5, 2018 | Walter Pyramid | (United States) Long Beach, USA |
| 12 | ACB JJ 12: Wardzinski vs. Pena | April 14, 2018 | Almaty Arena | Almaty, Kazakhstan |
| 11 | ACB JJ 11: Ramos vs. Najmi | March 3, 2018 | Pavelló Olímpic de Badalona | Badalona, Spain |
| 10 | ACB JJ 10: Panza vs. Rocha | January 26, 2018 | Club Hebraica | São Paulo, Brazil |
| 9 | ACB BJJ 9: WGP 60 KG/95 KG | December 9, 2017 | Dynamo Palace of Sports in Krylatskoye | Moscow, Russia |
| 8 | ACB BJJ 8: WGP 65 KG/95+ KG | October 28, 2017 | Ali Bin Hamad al-Attiyah Arena | Doha, Qatar |
| 7 | ACB BJJ 7: WGP 75 KG/85 KG | September 9, 2017 | Riocentro | Rio de Janeiro, Brazil |
| 6 | ACB BJJ 6: WGP 60 KG/65 KG | July 16, 2017 | Dynamo Palace of Sports in Krylatskoye | Moscow, Russia |
| 5 | ACB BJJ 5: WGP 95 KG/95+ KG | May 6, 2017 | OSiR Włochy | Warsaw, Poland |
| 4 | ACB BJJ 4: WGP 75 KG/85 KG | February 25, 2017 | Santiago Canyon College | (United States) Orange, California, USA |
| 3 | 3rd Berkut Jiu-Jitsu Invitational | 2016 | | Moscow, Russia |
| 2 | 2nd Berkut Jiu-Jitsu Invitational | November 21, 2015 | Dynamo Palace of Sports in Krylatskoye | Moscow, Russia |
| 1 | | | | |
