= 2018 in Absolute Championship Berkut =

Mixed martial arts events

Information
- First date: January 20, 2018

Events
- Total events: 24
- Kickboxing: 5
- BJJ: 5

The year 2018 was the sixth year in the history of the Absolute Championship Berkut, a mixed martial arts, kickboxing and Brazilian jiu-jitsu promotion based in Russia.

== List of events ==
=== ACB MMA ===
ACB MMA
No.	Event	Date	Venue	Location
1	ACB 78: Young Eagles 24	January 13, 2018	Sports Hall Coliseum	Grozny, Russia
2	ACB 79: Aguev vs. Alfaya	January 27, 2018	Sports Hall Coliseum	Grozny, Russia
3	ACB 80: Tumenov vs. Burrell	February 16, 2018	Basket-Hall	Krasnodar, Russia
4	ACB 81: Saidov vs. Carneiro	February 23, 2018	The Dome - Dubai Sports City	Dubai, United Arab Emirates
5	ACB 82: Silva vs. Kolobegov	March 9, 2018	Club Hebraica	São Paulo, Brazil
6	ACB 83: Borisov vs. Kerimov	March 24, 2018	Serhedchi Olympic Sport Centre	Baku, Azerbaijan
7	ACB 84: Agujev vs. Burrell	April 7, 2018	Ondrej Nepela Arena	Bratislava, Slovakia
8	ACB 85: Leone vs Ginazov	April 21, 2018	RDS Stadium	Rimini, Italy
9	ACB 86: Balaev vs. Raisov 2	May 5, 2018	Olimpiyskiy	Moscow, Russia
10	ACB 87: Mousah vs. Whiteford	May 19, 2018	Motorpoint Arena	Nottingham, England
11	ACB 88: Barnatt vs. Celiński	June 16, 2018	Sleeman Sports Complex	Brisbane, Australia
13	ACB 89: Abdulvakhabov vs. Bagov 3	September 8, 2018	Basket-Hall	Krasnodar, Russia
14	ACB 90: Vakhaev vs. Bilostenniy	November 10, 2018	VTB Ice Palace	Moscow, Russia

=== ACB KB ===
ACB KB
No.	Event	Date	Venue	Location
1	ACB KB 13: From Paris with war	February 24, 2018	Halle Georges Carpentier	Paris, France
2	ACB KB 14: Diamonds	March 23, 2018	Grinn Center	Orel, Russia
3	ACB KB 15: Grand Prix Kitek	April 20, 2018	Dynamo Sports Palace	Moscow, Russia
4	ACB KB 16: Clash of Titans	July 13, 2018	TBA	Târgoviște, Romania
5	ACB KB 17: Land Of Great Victories	August 5, 2018	TBA	Pskov, Russia

=== ACB JJ ===
ACB JJ
No.	Event	Date	Venue	Location
1	ACB JJ 10: Panza vs. Rocha	January 26, 2018	Club Hebraica	São Paulo, Brazil
2	ACB JJ 11: Ramos vs. Najmi	March 3, 2018	Pavelló Olímpic de Badalona	Badalona, Spain
3	ACB JJ 12: Wardzinski vs Pena	April 14, 2018	Almaty Arena	Almaty, Kazakhstan
4	ACB JJ 13: Rocha vs. Almeida	May 5, 2018	Walter Pyramid	(United States) Long Beach, USA
5	ACB JJ 14: Barbosa vs. Pena	June 30, 2018	Dynamo Sports Palace	Moscow, Russia

== ACB 78: Young Eagles 24 ==
ACB 78: Young Eagles 24
- Promotion: Absolute Championship Berkut
- Date: January 13, 2018
- Venue: Sports Hall Coliseum
- City: Grozny, Russia

Absolute Championship Berkut 78: Young Eagles 24 was a mixed martial arts event held by Absolute Championship Berkut on January 13, 2018 at the Sports Hall Coliseum in Grozny, Russia.

Background

Bonus awards:

The following fighters will be awarded $5,000 bonuses:

- Fight of the Night: Alibek Akhazaev vs. Oberdan Vieira
- Knockout of the Night: Yusup Umarov
- Submission of the Night: Abdul-Rakhman Makhajiev
- $3000 Stoppage Victory Bonuses: Andreas Stahl, Alan Gomes, Adlan Mamaev, Adam Aliev, Magomed Sulumov, Amir Elzhurkaev, Sayfullah Dzhabrailov, Magomed Raisov

Results

ACB 78
Weight Class				Method	Round	Time	Notes
Lightweight 70 kg	(Russia) Yusup Umarov	def.	(Brazil) Rander Junior	TKO (Punches)	1	0:16	
Lightweight 70 kg	(Russia) Magomed Raisov	def.	(United States) Pat Healy	TKO (Punches)	1	1:37	
Lightweight 70 kg	(Russia) Viskhan Magomadov	def.	(Brazil) Herbert Batista	Decision (Unanimous)	3	5:00	
Featherweight 66 kg	(Russia) Saifulla Dzhabrailov	def.	(Brazil) Sergio Soares	TKO (Punches)	1	0:43	
Lightweight 70 kg	(Russia) Abdul-Rakhman Makhazhiev	def.	(France) Damien Lapilus	Submission (Calf Slicer)	1	3:41	
Lightweight 70 kg	(Russia) Alibek Akhazaev	def.	(Brazil) Oberdan Vieira	Decision (Split)	3	5:00	
Featherweight 66 kg	(Russia) Amir Elzhurkaev	def.	(Brazil) Diego Lopes	KO (Punches)	2	3:03	
Featherweight 66 kg	(Russia) Magomed Sulumov	def.	(Brazil) Bruno Roverso	TKO (Elbows)	2	2:28	
Welterweight 77 kg	(Russia) Aslambek Arsamik	def.	(Brazil) Edilberto de Oliveira	Decision (Unanimous)	3	5:00	
Welterweight 77 kg	(Russia) Adam Aliev	def.	(Brazil) Ednilson Barros	TKO (Punches)	3	0:57	
Lightweight 70 kg	(Russia) Adlan Mamaev	def.	(Russia) Alberd Zhapuev	Submission (Anaconda Choke)	3	4:38	
Flyweight 57 kg	(Brazil) Alan Gomes	def.	(Russia) Shamil Akhmaev	TKO (Punches)	3	4:45	
Light Heavyweight 93 kg	(Russia) Rasul Saithozhaev	def.	(South Korea) Doo Hwan Kim	Decision (Unanimous)	3	5:00	
Middleweight 84 kg	(Russia) Ibrahim Magomedov	def.	(Russia) Umar Gaisumov	Decision (Unanimous)	3	5:00	
Bantamweight 61 kg	(Brazil) Rafael Dias	def.	(Russia) Akhmed Kukaev	Decision (Unanimous)	3	5:00	
Featherweight 66 kg	(Russia) Saikhan Dzhabrailov	def.	(Poland) Kamil Łebkowski	Decision (Split)	3	5:00	
Welterweight 77 kg	(Russia) Gadzhimurad Khiramagomedov	def.	(Brazil) Marcos Antonio Santana	Decision (Unanimous)	3	5:00	
Heavyweight 120 kg	(Russia) Anzor Shakhmurzaev	def.	(Romania) Anatoli Ciumac	TKO (Referee Stoppage)	3	4:43	
Welterweight 77 kg	(Sweden) Andreas Ståhl	def.	(Russia) Usman Bisultanov	KO (Punches)	1	1:24	
Flyweight 57 kg	(Russia) Khamzat Dzhabrailov	def.	(France) Samir Faiddine	Decision (Unanimous)	3	5:00	
Welterweight 77 kg	(Sweden) Fernando Gonzalez	def.	(Russia) Adam Bakaev	Decision (Unanimous)	3	5:00	

== ACB JJ 10: Panza vs. Rocha ==
ACB JJ 10: Panza vs. Rocha
- Promotion: Absolute Championship Berkut
- Date: January 26, 2018
- Venue: Club Hebraica
- City: São Paulo, Brazil

Absolute Championship Berkut Jiu-Jitsu 10: Panza vs. Rocha was a Brazilian jiu-jitsu event held by Absolute Championship Berkut on January 26, 2018 at the Club Hebraica in São Paulo, Brazil.

Background

Bonus awards:

The following fighters will be awarded $5,000 bonuses:

- Fight of the Night: Claudio Calasans vs. Patrick Gaudio
- Fastest submission of the Night: Mikey Musumeci
- Best Submission of the Night: Osvaldo Moizinho

=== Results ===
ACB JJ 10
Weight Class				Method	Round	Time	Notes
Heavyweight 95+ kg	(Brazil) João Gabriel Rocha	def.	(Brazil) Luiz Panza (c)	Points (3-0)	5		For the ACB Jiu-Jitsu GI Heavyweight Championship
Featherweight 65 kg	(Brazil) Paulo Miyao	def.	(Brazil) Augusto Mendes (c)	Points (4-0)	5		For ACB Jiu-Jitsu Featherweight Championship
Heavyweight 95+ kg	(Brazil) Marcus Almeida	def.	(Brazil) Mahamed Aly	Points (3-0)	3		
Middleweight 85 kg	(Brazil) Leandro Lo	def.	(Brazil) Otávio Souza	Points (3-0)	3		
Welterweight 75 kg	(Brazil) Lucas Lepri	def.	(Brazil) Márcio André	Submission (Choke)	2		
Light Heavyweight 95 kg	(Poland) Adam Wardziński	def.	(Brazil) Erberth Santos	Submission (Verbal tap)	2		
Middleweight 85 kg	(Brazil) Patrick Gaudio	def.	(Brazil) Claudio Calasans	Decision (Unanimous)	3		
Middleweight 85 kg	(Brazil) Romulo Barral	def.	(Brazil) Arnaldo Maidana	Submission (Choke)	2		
Light Heavyweight 95 kg	(Brazil) Yuri Simões	def.	(Russia) Abdurakhman Bilarov	Decision (Unanimous)	3		
Middleweight 85 kg	(Brazil) Rudson Mateus	def.	(Brazil) Braulio Estima	Decision (Unanimous)	3		
Welterweight 75 kg	(Brazil) Lucas Rocha	def.	(Brazil) Rodrigo Caporal	Points (1-0)	3		
Light Heavyweight 95 kg	(Brazil) Gabriel Lucas	def.	(Brazil) Ricardo Evangelista	Decision (Split)	3		
Welterweight 75 kg	(Brazil) Luan Carvalho	def.	(Brazil) Marcelo Mafra	Points (1-0)	3		
Light Heavyweight 95 kg	(Brazil) Igor Silva	def.	(Brazil) Rodrigo Cavaca	Submission (Choke)	1		
Middleweight 85 kg	(Brazil) Thiago Sá	def.	(United States) Josh Hinger	Points (1-0)	3		
Featherweight 65 kg	(Brazil) Osvaldo Moizinho	def.	(Brazil) Nicollas Welker	Submission (Armbar)	2		
Bantamweight 60 kg	(United States) Michael Musumeci	def.	(Brazil) Rafael Freitas	Submission (Straight Ankle Lock)	1		

== ACB 79: Agujev vs. Alfaya ==
ACB 79: Agujev vs. Alfaya
- Promotion: Absolute Championship Berkut
- Date: January 27, 2018
- Venue: Sports Hall Coliseum
- City: Grozny, Russia

Absolute Championship Berkut 79: Agujev vs. Alfaya was a mixed martial arts event held by Absolute Championship Berkut on January 27, 2018 at the Sports Hall Coliseum in Grozny, Russia.

Background The card was originally headlined by a title fight between champion Askar Askarov and Rasul Albaskhanov for the ACB Flyweight Championship. On January 13, it was announced Askarov had to withdraw due to heavy angina. The title fight between Askarov and Albaskhanov has been temporarily postponed.

Batraz Agnaev had to withdraw due to an injury and is not able to defend his Light-Heavyweight title against Döwletjan Ýagşymyradow from Turkmenistan and the bout was canceled. Luis Fernando Miranda will step in as a replacement against Ýagşymyradow.

Magomed Magomedov was to face Walter Pereira Jr. at this event but had to withdraw due to illness. The bout has been temporarily postponed to ACB 81.

Islam Isaev, Said-Khamzat Avkhadov, Thiago Bonifacio Silva and Zach Makovsky were injured during training camp. So they were removed from the card.

Bonus awards:

The following fighter will be awarded $10,000 bonuses:

- Submission of the Night: Rasul Shovkhalov
- $5000 Stoppage Victory Bonuses: Husein Kushagov, Magomed Ginazov, Dovletdzhan Yagshimuradov and Arbi Agujev

=== Results ===
ACB 79
Weight Class				Method	Round	Time	Notes
Welterweight 77 kg	(Russia) Arbi Aguev	def.	(Brazil) Marcelo Alfaya	KO (Punches)	1	0:58	
Featherweight 66 kg	(Russia) Adlan Bataev	def.	(Brazil) Maike Linhares	Decision (Unanimous)	3	5:00	
Light Heavyweight 93 kg	(Turkmenistan) Dovletdzhan Yagshimuradov	def.	(Brazil) Luis Fernando Miranda	TKO (Punches)	1	1:03	
Lightweight 70 kg	(Russia) Rasul Shovhalov	def.	(Brazil) Lindeclecio Oliveira	Submission (Armbar)	1	1:01	
Middleweight 84 kg	(Russia) Baisangur Vakhitov	def.	(South Korea) Jae Young Kim	Decision (Unanimous)	3	5:00	
Flyweight 57 kg	(Russia) Magomed Ginazov	def.	(Brazil) Bruno Viana	TKO (Punches)	2	0:48	
Middleweight 84 kg	(Russia) Husein Kushagov	def.	(Poland) Michał Wiencek	KO (Punch to the Body)	1	4:59	
Featherweight 66 kg	(Russia) Abdul-Rakhman Temirov	def.	(Brazil) André Borges	Decision (Unanimous)	3	5:00	
Bantamweight 61 kg	(Russia) Shamil Shakhbulatov	def.	(Canada) Xavier Alaoui	Decision (Majority)	3	5:00	
Flyweight 57 kg	(Russia) Kurban Gadzhiev	def.	(Brazil) Janalson Pereira	Decision (Unanimous)	3	5:00	

== ACB 80: Tumenov vs. Burrell ==
ACB 80: Tumenov vs. Burrell
- Promotion: Absolute Championship Berkut
- Date: February 16, 2018
- Venue: Basket-Hall
- City: Krasnodar, Russia
- Attendance: ~5,000

Absolute Championship Berkut 80: Tumenov vs. Burrell was a mixed martial arts event held by Absolute Championship Berkut on February 16, 2018 at the Basket-Hall in Krasnodar, Russia.

Background The card was originally headlined by a title fight between champion Mukhamed Berkhamov and Albert Tumenov for the ACB Welterweight Championship. On January 1, it was announced Berkhamov had to withdraw due to a broken arm. Nah-Shon Burrell will step in as a replacement against Tumenov.

Initially Muhammed Kokov was supposed to face Bubba Jenkins, but Jenkins withdrew from the fight due to injury. The Brazilian Alexandre Bezerra will step in as a replacement against Kokov.

Bonus awards:

The following fighters will be awarded $10,000 bonuses:

- Fight of the Night: Daniel Santos vs. Dukvaha Astamirov

=== Result ===
ACB 80
Weight Class				Method	Round	Time	Notes
Welterweight 77 kg	(Russia) Albert Tumenov	def.	(United States) Nah-Shon Burrell	Decision (Unanimous)	3	5:00	
Lightweight 70 kg	(Russia) Ali Bagov	def.	(Brazil) Leandro "Buscapé" Silva	Decision (Unanimous)	3	5:00	
Middleweight 85 kg	(Turkey) Ibragim Chuzhigaev	def.	(Kazakhstan) Igor Svirid	Decision (Unanimous)	3	5:00	
Lightweight 70 kg	(Russia) Shamil Nikaev	def.	(Russia) Alexander Sarnavskiy	Decision (Split)	3	5:00	
Featherweight 66 kg	(Russia) Mukhamed Kokov	def.	(Brazil) Taigro Costa	Decision (Unanimous)	3	5:00	
Bantamweight 61 kg	(Russia) Murad Kalamov	def.	(Japan) Takeya Mizugaki	Decision (Unanimous)	3	5:00	
Lightweight 70 kg	(Brazil) Gleristone Santos	def.	(Russia) Islam Makoev	Decision (Unanimous)	3	5:00	
Welterweight 77 kg	(Brazil) Ismael de Jesus	def.	(Russia) Imran Abaev	Decision (Unanimous)	3	5:00	
Bantamweight 61 kg	(Russia) Valeriy Khazhirokov	def.	(Ukraine) Ruslan Belikov	Decision (Unanimous)	3	5:00	
Heavyweight 120 kg	(Russia) Evgeny Erokhin	def.	(Russia) Khanif Mirzamagomedov	Decision (Split)	3	5:00	
Light Heavyweight 93 kg	(Russia) Amirkhan Guliev	def.	(Russia) Ilya Bochkov	Decision (Majority)	3	5:00	
Bantamweight 61 kg	(Brazil) Daniel Santos	def.	(Russia) Dukvaha Astamirov	Decision (Majority)	3	5:00	
Lightweight 70 kg	(Russia) Rustam Asuev	def.	(Argentina) Juan Pablo Varela	Decision (Unanimous)	3	5:00	

== ACB 81: Saidov vs. Carneiro ==
ACB 81: Saidov vs. Carneiro
- Promotion: Absolute Championship Berkut
- Date: February 23, 2018
- Venue: The Dome - Dubai Sports City
- City: Dubai, United Arab Emirates

Absolute Championship Berkut 81: Saidov vs. Carneiro was a mixed martial arts event held by Absolute Championship Berkut on February 23, 2018 at The Dome - Dubai Sports City in Dubai, United Arab Emirates.

Background Yoni Sherbatov had to withdraw due to a shoulder injury and is not able to fight against Josiel Silva. Sam Halliday will step in as a replacement against Silva.

Bonus awards:

The following fighters will be awarded $10,000 bonuses:

- Submission of the Night: Abdul-Rahman Dzhanaev
- $5000 Stoppage Victory Bonuses: Khuseyn Shaikhaev, Josiel Silva, Narek Avagyan, Ramazan Kuramagimedov, Islam Isaev, Luke Barnatt

=== Results ===
ACB 81
Weight Class				Method	Round	Time	Notes
Welterweight 77 kg	(Russia) Aslambek Saidov	def.	(Brazil) Roan Carneiro	Decision (Unanimous)	3	5:00	
Light Heavyweight 93 kg	(England) Luke Barnatt	def.	(Russia) Maxim Futin	TKO (Knees and Punches)	2	3:27	
Middleweight 85 kg	(Russia) Abdul-Rakhman Dzhanaev	def.	(Brazil) Leandro "Batata" Silva	Submission (Armbar)	3	4:52	
Featherweight 66 kg	(Russia) Islam Isaev	def.	(Brazil) Thiago Luis Bonifacio Silva	TKO (Punches)	1	3:48	
Welterweight 77 kg	(Russia) Ramazan Kuramagomedov	def.	(Bulgaria) Georgi Valentinov	Submission (Guillotine Choke)	2	0:45	
Bantamweight 61 kg	(Brazil) Francisco Maciel	def.	(Russia) Maharbek Karginov	Decision (Unanimous)	3	5:00	
Flyweight 57 kg	(Armenia) Narek Avagyan	def.	(Brazil) Isaac Pimentel	TKO (Punches)	2	3:19	
Flyweight 57 kg	(Brazil) Josiel Silva	def.	(England) Sam Halliday	TKO (Elbows and Punches)	1	4:48	
Lightweight 70 kg	(Afghanistan) Baz Mohammad Mubariz	def.	(Scotland) Iain Feenan	Decision (Unanimous)	3	5:00	
Heavyweight 120 kg	(Canada) Tanner Boser	def.	(United States) DJ Linderman	Decision (Unanimous)	3	5:00	
Lightweight 70 kg	(Afghanistan) Ahmed Wali Hotak	def.	(Ukraine) Vladislav Stepanov	Decision (Unanimous)	3	5:00	
Featherweight 66 kg	(Russia) Khusein Sheikhaev	def.	(Brazil) Diego Lopes	TKO (Punches)	3	2:42	
Featherweight 66 kg	(England) Shoaib Yousaf	def.	(Turkey) Kadir Dalkiran	Decision (Unanimous)	3	5:00	

== ACB KB 13: From Paris with war ==
ACB KB 13: From Paris with war
- Promotion: Absolute Championship Berkut
- Date: February 24, 2018
- Venue: Halle Georges Carpentier
- City: Paris, France

ACB KB 13: From Paris with war was a kickboxing event held by Absolute Championship Berkut on February 24, 2018 at the Halle Georges Carpentier in Paris, France.

Background

Bonus awards:

The following fighters will be awarded $10,000 bonuses:

- Fight of the Night:
- Knockout of the Night:
- $5000 Stoppage Victory Bonuses:

=== Results ===
ACB KB 13
Weight Class				Method	Round	Time	Notes
Light Heavyweight 95 kg	(Belarus) Igor Bugaenko	def.	(France) Freddy Kemayo	Decision (Unanimous)	3	3:00	
Lightweight 70 kg	(France) Samy Sana	def.	(Russia) Rashid Salihov	Decision (Unanimous)	3	3:00	
Welterweight 77 kg	(France) Cyril Benzaquen		(Netherlands) Darryl Sichtman	Draw	3	3:00	
Welterweight 77 kg	(France) Djibril Ehouo	def.	(Belarus) Yuri Bessmertny	Decision (Unanimous)	3	3:00	
Catchweight 74 kg	(France) Mohamed Diaby	def.	(Italy) Rosario Presti	Decision (Unanimous)	3	3:00	
Featherweight 65 kg	(Morocco) Zakaria Tijarti	def.	(Russia) Tamerlan Bashirov	Decision (Unanimous)	3	3:00	
Middleweight 85 kg	(Moldova) Aurel Ignat	def.	(Russia) Mikhail Chalykh	Decision (Unanimous)	3	3:00	
Welterweight 77 kg	(Russia) Islam Khozhdevdiev	def.	(Moldova) Artur Brinza	Decision (Unanimous)	3	3:00	
Light Heavyweight 95 kg	(Netherlands) Max van Gelder	def.	(China) Su Zhihao	Decision (Unanimous)	3	3:00	

== ACB JJ 11: Ramos vs. Najmi ==
ACB JJ 11: Ramos vs. Najmi
- Promotion: Absolute Championship Berkut
- Date: March 3, 2018
- Venue: Pavelló Olímpic de Badalona
- City: Badalona, Spain

Absolute Championship Berkut Jiu-Jitsu 11: Ramos vs. Najmi was a Brazilian jiu-jitsu event held by Absolute Championship Berkut on March 3, 2018 at the Pavelló Olímpic de Badalona in Badalona, Spain.

Background

Bonus awards:

The following fighters will be awarded $5,000 bonuses:

- Fight of the Night:
- Fastest submission of the Night:
- Best Submission of the Night:

=== Results ===
ACB JJ 11
Weight Class				Method	Round	Time	Notes
Welterweight 75 kg	(Brazil) Davi Ramos	def.	(United States) Edwin Najmi (c)	Decision (Unanimous)	5	5:00	For the ACB Jiu-Jitsu GI Welterweight Championship
Middleweight 85 kg	(Brazil) Isaque Bahiense	def.	(Brazil) Otávio Souza	Points (3-0)	3	5:00	
Middleweight 85 kg	(Brazil) Claudio Calasans	def.	(Brazil) Yan Cabral	Points (3-0)	3	5:00	
Welterweight 75 kg	(Brazil) Michael Langhi	def.	(Brazil) Márcio André	Decision (Split)	3	5:00	
Featherweight 65 kg	(Brazil) Bruno Frazatto	def.	(Brazil) Gabriel Marangoni	Decision (Unanimous)	3	5:00	
Welterweight 75 kg	(Brazil) Lucas Rocha	def.	(Spain) Alex Cabanes	Decision (Unanimous)	3	5:00	
Middleweight 85 kg	(Brazil) Rudson Mateus	def.	(Brazil) Mathias Ribeiro	Submission (Armbar)	1	0:32	
Heavyweight 95+ kg	(Brazil) Victor Honorio	def.	(Brazil) Erberth Santos	Decision (Split)	3	5:00	
Welterweight 75 kg	(Brazil) Luan Carvalho	def.	(Russia) Daud Adaev	Submission (Toe hold)	3	1:29	
Middleweight 85 kg	(Brazil) AJ Sousa	def.	(Brazil) Arnaldo Maidana	Decision (Unanimous)	3	5:00	
Heavyweight 95+ kg	(United States) Joseph Moku Kahawai	def.	(Brazil) Vinny Magalhães	Decision (Split)	3	5:00	
Featherweight 65 kg	(United States) Isaac Doederlein	def.	(Brazil) Kim Terra	Decision (Unanimous)	3	5:00	
Bantamweight 60 kg	(Brazil) Samir Chantre	def.	(Brazil) Laercio Fernandes	Points (1-0)	3	5:00	
Bantamweight 60 kg	(Japan) Tomoyuki Hashimoto	def.	(Brazil) Mayko Araújo	Points (3-0)	3	5:00	
Welterweight 75 kg	(Brazil) Marcelo Mafra	def.	(Brazil) Rodrigo Caporal	Points (1-0)	3	5:00	

== ACB 82: Silva vs. Kolobegov ==
ACB 82: Silva vs. Kolobegov
- Promotion: Absolute Championship Berkut
- Date: March 9, 2018
- Venue: Club Hebraica
- City: São Paulo, Brazil

Absolute Championship Berkut 82: Silva vs. Kolobegov was a mixed martial arts event held by Absolute Championship Berkut on March 9, 2018 in São Paulo, Brazil.

Background

Bonus awards:

The following fighters will be awarded $10,000 bonuses:

- Fight of the Night: Matheus Mattos vs. Nashkho Galaev
- $5000 Stoppage Victory Bonuses: Gregory Milliard, Walter Pereira Jr., Brett Cooper, Rodolfo Vieira

=== Results ===
ACB 82
Weight Class				Method	Round	Time	Notes
Middleweight 84 kg	(Russia) Mikhail Kolobegov	def.	(Brazil) Thiago Silva	Decision (Split)	3	5:00	
Light Heavyweight 93 kg	(Brazil) Daniel Sarafian	def.	(Brazil) Carlos Eduardo	Decision (Unanimous)	3	5:00	
Bantamweight 61 kg	(Brazil) Matheus Mattos	def.	(Russia) Nashkho Galaev	Decision (Majority)	3	5:00	
Middleweight 84 kg	(Brazil) Rodolfo Vieira	def.	(Luxembourg) Alexander Neufang	TKO (Punches)	1	3:42	
Featherweight 66 kg	(Brazil) Taigro Costa	def.	(Brazil) Marcos dos Santos	Decision (Unanimous)	3	5:00	
Lightweight 70 kg	(United States) Christos Giagos	def.	(Brazil) Herdeson Batista	Decision (Unanimous)	3	5:00	
Welterweight 77 kg	(United States) Brett Cooper	def.	(Brazil) André Santos	KO (Punches)	1	1:42	
Bantamweight 61 kg	(Brazil) Ary Farias	def.	(Brazil) Saimon Oliveira	Decision (Unanimous)	3	5:00	
Welterweight 77 kg	(Brazil) Bruce Souto	def.	(Brazil) Wendell Oliveira	Decision (Unanimous)	3	5:00	
Flyweight 57 kg	(Brazil) Maycon Silvan	def.	(Brazil) José Maria Tomé	Decision (Majority)	3	5:00	
Welterweight 77 kg	(Brazil) Roberto Neves	def.	(Brazil) Adilson Fernandes	Decision (Unanimous)	3	5:00	
Bantamweight 61 kg	(Brazil) Walter Pereira Jr.	def.	(Brazil) Thiago Gaia	TKO (Punch to the Body)	1	1:00	
Middleweight 84 kg	(Aruba) Gregory Milliard	def.	(Brazil) Alexandre Hoffmann	TKO (Punches)	1	1:54	
Lightweight 70 kg	(Brazil) Emerson Rios	def.	(Brazil) Vinicius Barqueta	TKO (Eye Injury)	1	5:00	

== ACB KB 14: Diamonds ==
ACB KB 14: Diamonds
- Promotion: Absolute Championship Berkut
- Date: March 23, 2018
- Venue: Grinn Center
- City: Orel, Russia

ACB KB 14: Diamonds will be a kickboxing event held by Absolute Championship Berkut on March 23, 2018 at the Grinn Center in Orel, Russia .

Background

Bonus awards:

The following fighters will be awarded $10,000 bonuses:

- Fight of the Night:
- Knockout of the Night:
- $5000 Stoppage Victory Bonuses:

=== Results ===
ACB KB 14
Weight Class				Method	Round	Time	Notes
Lightweight 70 kg	(Russia) Vlad Tuinov	def.	(Japan) Yu Hirono	Decision (Unanimous)	3	3:00	
Lightweight 70 kg	(Belarus) Farkhad Akhmedzhanov	def.	(Russia) Armen Israelyan	Decision (Unanimous)	3	3:00	
Featherweight 65 kg	(South Sudan) Lofogo Sarour	def.	(Russia) Rustam Avilov	Decision (Unanimous)	3	3:00	
Lightweight 70 kg	(Netherlands) William Diender	def.	(Russia) Sergei Chadin	Decision (Unanimous)	3	3:00	
Lightweight 70 kg	(Russia) Vadim Davydov	def.	(Russia) Ivan Semiglyadov	Decision (Split)	3	3:00	
Bantamweight 60 kg	(Russia) Daniil Gavrilov	def.	(Russia) Bashlam Amadov	Decision (Unanimous)	3	3:00	
Heavyweight 120 kg	(Russia) Alisher Yuldashev	def.	(Russia) Daniil Shatalov	KO (Punches)	1	1:19	
Middleweight 85 kg	(Russia) Amin Aleskerov	def.	(Russia) Muhammad Abuev	Decision (Unanimous)	3	3:00	
Flyweight 57 kg	(Azerbaijan) Rolan Guliev	vs.	(Russia) Artem Akimov	KO (Punches)	1	1:20	
Welterweight 77 kg	(Russia) Vadim Apsit	def.	(Russia) Alexander Ermoshin	KO (Head Kick and Punches)	2	1:23	
Bantamweight 60 kg	(Russia) Suleyman Beterbiev	def.	(Russia) Andrei Bragin	TKO (Referee Stoppage)	1	1:11	

== ACB 83: Borisov vs. Kerimov ==
ACB 83: Borisov vs. Kerimov
- Promotion: Absolute Championship Berkut
- Date: March 24, 2018
- Venue: Serhedchi Olympic Sport Center
- City: Baku, Azerbaijan

Absolute Championship Berkut 83: Borisov vs. Kerimov will be a mixed martial arts event held by Absolute Championship Berkut on March 24, 2018 at the Serhedchi Olympic Sport Center in Baku, Azerbaijan.

Background Efraín Escudero did not reach Baku because of airplane delays in Germany, his fight against Khamzat Aushev was canceled.

Bonus awards:

The following fighters will be awarded $10,000 bonuses:

- Fight of the Night: Rustam Kerimov vs. Oleg Borisov
- Submission of the Night: Dilenio Lopes
- $5000 Stoppage Victory Bonuses: Ashab Zulaev, Daniel Omielanczuk, Amir Aliakbari

=== Results ===
ACB 83
Weight Class				Method	Round	Time	Notes
Bantamweight 61 kg	(Russia) Rustam Kerimov	def.	(Russia) Oleg Borisov	Decision (Split)	5	5:00	For the Vacant ACB Bantamweight Championship
Heavyweight 120 kg	(Iran) Amir Aliakbari	def.	(Estonia) Denis Smoldarev	TKO (Elbows and Punches)	1	02:27	
Bantamweight 61 kg	(Azerbaijan) Tural Ragimov	def.	(Germany) Attila Korkmaz	Decision (Unanimous)	3	5:00	
Bantamweight 61 kg	(Russia) Magomed Magomedov	def.	(Latvia) Edgars Skrīvers	Decision (Unanimous)	3	5:00	
Featherweight 66 kg	(Russia) Alihan Suleimanov	def.	(Lithuania) Sergej Grecicho	Decision (Unanimous)	3	5:00	
Lightweight 70 kg	(Azerbaijan) Bakhtiyar Arzumanov	def.	(Russia) Miri Sadygov	Submission (Rear-Naked Choke)	1	4:50	
Featherweight 66 kg	(Brazil) Dileno Lopes	def.	(Russia) Islam Yunusov	Submission (Guillotine Choke)	1	1:12	
Featherweight 66 kg	(Georgia (country)) Mate Sanikidze	def.	(Azerbaijan) Firuz Mammadov	Decision (Split)	3	5:00	
Heavyweight 120 kg	(Poland) Daniel Omielańczuk	def.	(United States) Bobby Brents	Submission (Neck Crank)	1	2:45	
Featherweight 66 kg	(Russia) Lambert Akhiadov	def.	(United States) Adrian Diaz	Decision (Unanimous)	3	5:00	
Middleweight 84 kg	(Russia) Ibragim Magomedov	def.	(Brazil) Rafael Xavier	Decision (Unanimous)	3	5:00	
Featherweight 66 kg	(Russia) Askhab Zulaev	def.	(Brazil) Robson Silva	TKO (Punches)	2	2:40	

== ACB 84: Agujev vs. Burrell ==
ACB 84: Agujev vs. Burrell
- Promotion: Absolute Championship Berkut
- Date: April 7, 2018
- Venue: Ondrej Nepela Arena
- City: Bratislava, Slovakia

Absolute Championship Berkut 84: Burrell vs. Agujev was a mixed martial arts event held by Absolute Championship Berkut on April 7, 2018 at the Ondrej Nepela Arena in Bratislava, Slovakia.

Background The card was originally headlined by a fight between Attila Végh and Jose Daniel Toledo. On March 30, it was announced Vegh had to withdraw because he torn his meniscus. Ron Stallings will step in as a replacement against Toledo.

Ludovit Klein had to withdraw due to injury, Luis Alberto Nogueira will step in to face Islam Sizbulatov.

Bonus awards:

The following fighters will be awarded $10,000 bonuses:

- Fight of the Night: Joshua Aveles vs. Adrian Zieliński
- Knockout of the Night: Yusup Umarov
- Submission of the Night: Rany Saadeh
- $5000 Stoppage Victory Bonuses: Jae Young Kim, Jose Daniel Toledo, Maciej Rozanski

=== Results ===
ACB 84
Weight Class				Method	Round	Time	Notes
Welterweight 77 kg	(Russia) Arbi Agujev	def.	(United States) Nah-Shon Burrell	Decision (Unanimous)	3	5:00	
Middleweight 84 kg	(South Korea) Jae Young Kim	def.	(Slovakia) Roland Čambal	TKO(Punches)	1	1:50	
Featherweight 66 kg	(Russia) Lom-Ali Eskijew	def.	(Peru) Luis Palomino	Decision (Unanimous)	3	5:00	
Featherweight 66 kg	(Russia) Adlan Bataev	def.	(Brazil) Saul Almeida	Decision (Unanimous)	3	5:00	
Lightweight 70 kg	(United States) Joshua Aveles	def.	(Poland) Adrian Zieliński	Decision (Unanimous)	3	5:00	
Light Heavyweight 93 kg	(Spain) Jose Daniel Toledo	def.	(Croatia) Stjepan Bekavac	TKO (Knee and Punches)	1	3:25	
Lightweight 70 kg	(Russia) Yusup Umarov	def.	(United States) Darren Smith Jr.	KO (Punch)	1	3:15	
Bantamweight 61 kg	(Germany) Rany Saadeh	def.	(Australia) Trent Girdham	Submission (Heel Hook)	1	2:18	
Featherweight 66 kg	(Russia) Islam Sizbulatov	def.	(Brazil) Luis Alberto Nogueira	KO (Punch)	1	1:39	
Middleweight 84 kg	(Poland) Maciej Różański	def.	(England) Dan Hope	Submission (Armbar)	2	4:56	
Featherweight 66 kg	(Russia) Arbi Mezhidov	def.	(Peru) Jose Zarauz	Decision (Unanimous)	3	5:00	
Middleweight 84 kg	(Kazakhstan) Umar Yankovskiy	def.	(United States) Ben Egli	Decision (Unanimous)	3	5:00	

== ACB JJ 12: Wardzinski vs Pena ==
ACB JJ 12: Wardzinski vs Pena
- Promotion: Absolute Championship Berkut
- Date: April 14, 2018
- Venue: Almaty Arena
- City: Almaty, Kazakhstan

Absolute Championship Berkut Jiu-Jitsu 12: Wardzinski vs Pena will be a Brazilian jiu-jitsu event held by Absolute Championship Berkut on April 14, 2018 at the Almaty Arena in Almaty, Kazakhstan.

Background

Bonus awards:

The following fighters will be awarded $5,000 bonuses:

- Fight of the Night:
- Fastest submission of the Night:
- Best Submission of the Night:

=== Results ===
ACB JJ 12
Weight Class				Method	Round	Time	Notes
Light Heavyweight 95 kg	(Brazil) Felipe Pena (c)	def.	(Poland) Adam Wardziński	Submission (Bow and Arrow Choke)	3	3:21	For the ACB Jiu-Jitsu GI Light Heavyweight Championship
Lightweight 65 kg	(Brazil) Paulo Miyao (c)	def.	(Brazil) Osvaldo Moizinho	Points	5	5:00	For the ACB Jiu-Jitsu GI Lightweight Championship
Featherweight 60 kg	(Brazil) João Miyao (c)	def.	(Brazil) Samir Chantre	Points	5	5:00	For the ACB Jiu-Jitsu GI Featherweight Championship
Light Heavyweight 95 kg	(United States) Keenan Cornelius	def.	(Brazil) Mahamed Aly	Decision (Split)	3	5:00	
Welterweight 75 kg	(Brazil) Luan Carvalho	def.	(United States) Edwin Najmi	Decision (Split)	3	5:00	
Light Heavyweight 95 kg	(Brazil) Lucas Barbosa	def.	(Brazil) Jackson Sousa	Decision (Split)	3	5:00	
Middleweight 85 kg	(Brazil) Patrick Gaudio	def.	(Brazil) Thiago Sá	Points	3	5:00	
Middleweight 85 kg	(Brazil) Arnaldo Maidana	def.	(United States) Josh Hinger	Points	3	5:00	
Middleweight 85 kg	(Brazil) Rudson Mateus	def.	(Kazakhstan) Ayub Mogomadov	Submission (Rear-Naked Choke)	1	2:05	
Heavyweight 95+ kg	(Brazil) Erberth Santos	def.	(United States) Joseph Moku Kahawai	Submission (Bow and Arrow Choke)	3	2:13	
Middleweight 85 kg	(Brazil) Isaque Bahiense	def.	(Brazil) Claudio Calasans	Points	3	5:00	
Lightweight 65 kg	(Brazil) Kim Terra	def.	(Brazil) Nicollas Welker	Submission (Rear-Naked Choke)	3	4:11	
Welterweight 75 kg	(Brazil) Rodrigo Caporal	def.	(Russia) Daud Adaev	Points	3	5:00	
Heavyweight 95+ kg	(Brazil) Victor Honório	def.	(Russia) Muhammad Kerimov	Points	3	5:00	
Featherweight 60 kg	(Brazil) Rodnei Barbosa	def.	(Brazil) Mayko Araújo	Points	3	5:00	
Heavyweight 95+ kg	(Brazil) Gabriel Lucas	def.	(Brazil) Vinny Magalhães	Points	3	5:00	

== ACB KB 15: Grand Prix Kitek ==
ACB KB 15: Grand Prix Kitek
- Promotion: Absolute Championship Berkut
- Date: April 20, 2018
- Venue: Dynamo Sports Palace
- City: Moscow, Russia

ACB KB 15: Grand Prix Kitek will be a kickboxing event held by Absolute Championship Berkut on April 20, 2018 at the Dynamo Sports Palace in Moscow, Russia .

Background

Bonus awards:

The following fighters will be awarded $10,000 bonuses:

- Fight of the Night:
- Knockout of the Night:
- $5000 Stoppage Victory Bonuses:

=== Results ===
ACB KB 15
Weight Class				Method	Round	Time	Notes
Middleweight 85 kg	(Russia) Artem Levin	def.	(Belarus) Igor Bugaenko	Decision (Unanimous)	5	3:00	For the ACB KB Middleweight Championship
Heavyweight 120 kg	(Ukraine) Tsotne Rogava	def.	(Brazil) Jhonata Diniz (c)	Decision (Unanimous)	5	3:00	For the ACB KB Heavyweight Championship
Welterweight 77 kg	(Azerbaijan) Perviz Abdullayev	def.	(Russia) Islam Baibatyrov	TKO (Retirement)	3	3:00	For the ACB KB Welterweight Championship
Lightweight 70 kg	(Russia) Alexander Stetsurenko	vs.	(Brazil) Jonatan Oliveira	Decision (Unanimous)	3	3:00	
Lightweight 70 kg	(Russia) Dzhabar Askerov	def.	(Russia) Yergali Urbulatov	Decision (Unanimous)	3	3:00	
Lightweight 70 kg	(Russia) Ivan Kondratiev	def.	(Russia) Ramazan Razakov	Decision (Unanimous)	3	3:00	
Welterweight 77 kg	(Russia) Vadim Apsit	def.	(Russia) Mansur Vaduev	Decision (Unanimous)	3	3:00	
Lightweight 70 kg	(Russia) Adsalam Barkinkhoev	def.	(Russia) Vadim Davydov	Decision (Unanimous)	3	3:00	
Bantamweight 60 kg	(Russia) Daniil Gavrilov	def.	(Armenia) Gor Nazaryan	KO (Head Kick)	2	0:37	
Featherweight 65 kg	(Russia) Rodion Sheremet	def.	(Russia) Vitaliy Volosovskiy	Decision (Unanimous)	3	3:00	
Welterweight 77 kg	(Uzbekistan) Sher Mamazulunov	def.	(Russia) Ruslan Kostin	TKO (Punches)	1	1:45	

== ACB 85: Leone vs Ginazov ==
ACB 85: Leone vs Ginazov
- Promotion: Absolute Championship Berkut
- Date: April 21, 2018
- Venue: RDS Stadium
- City: Rimini, Italy
- Attendance: ~100

Absolute Championship Berkut 85: Leone vs Ginazov was a mixed martial arts event held by Absolute Championship Berkut on April 21, 2018 at the RDS Stadium in Rimini, Italy.

Background Bonus awards:

The following fighters will be awarded $10,000 bonuses:

- Fight of the Night: Amirkhan Adaev vs. Aurel Pirtea
- Submission of the Night: Miguel Felipe Bunes da Silva
- $5000 Stoppage Victory Bonuses: Niola Dipchikov, Geane Herrera, Wendres da Silva

=== Results ===
ACB 85
Weight Class				Method	Round	Time	Notes
Bantamweight 61 kg	(United States) Anthony Leone	def.	(Russia) Magomed Ginazov	Decision (Unanimous)	3	5:00	
Lightweight 70 kg	(Russia) Amirkhan Adaev	def.	(Romania) Aurel Pîrtea	Decision (Unanimous)	3	5:00	
Wellterweight 77 kg	(United States) E. J. Brooks	def.	(Russia) Husein Kushagov	Decision (Split)	3	5:00	
Middleweight 84 kg	(Brazil) Wendres da Silva	def.	(Russia) Baisangur Vakhitov	Submission (Armbar)	2	4:59	
Flyweight 57 kg	(Brazil) Miguel Felipe Bunes da Silva	def.	(Russia) Yoni Sherbatov	Submission (Armbar)	1	4:08	
Welterweight 77 kg	(Italy) Giovanni Melillo	def.	(England) Ricardo Franco	Submission (Guillotine Choke)	2	1:52	
Middleweight 84 kg	(Bulgaria) Nikola Dipchikov	def.	(Ukraine) Alexander Dolotenko	TKO (Punches)	2	4:48	
Lightweight 70 kg	(Russia) Daud Shaikhaev	def.	(United States) Jason Fischer	Decision (Majority)	3	5:00	
Lightweight 70 kg	(Brazil) Joilton Santos	def.	(France) Jason Ponet	Decision (Majority)	3	5:00	
Flyweight 57 kg	(United States) Geane Herrera	def.	(United States) Darren Mima	Submission (Rear-Naked Choke)	1	1:53	
Bantamweight 61 kg	(Romania) Bogdan Barbu	def.	(Kazakhstan) Nursultan Kassymkhanov	Decision (Unanimous)	3	5:00	

== ACB JJ 13: Rocha vs. Almeida ==
ACB JJ 13: Rocha vs. Almeida
- Promotion: Absolute Championship Berkut
- Date: May 5, 2018
- Venue: Walter Pyramid
- City: (United States) Long Beach, USA

Absolute Championship Berkut Jiu-Jitsu 13: Rocha vs. Almeida was a Brazilian jiu-jitsu event held by Absolute Championship Berkut on May 5, 2018 at the Walter Pyramid in Long Beach, USA.

Background

Bonus awards:

The following fighters will be awarded $5,000 bonuses:

- Fight of the Night:
- Fastest submission of the Night:
- Best Submission of the Night:

=== Results ===
ACB JJ 13
Weight Class				Method	Round	Time	Notes
Heavyweight 95+ kg	(Brazil) Marcus Almeida	def.	(Brazil) João Gabriel Rocha (c)	Points	5	5:00	For the ACB Jiu-Jitsu GI Heavyweight Championship
Middleweight 85 kg	(Brazil) Leandro Lo	def.	(Brazil) Gabriel Arges (c)	Points	5	5:00	For the ACB Jiu-Jitsu GI Middleweight Championship
Heavyweight 95+ kg	(Brazil) Vinny Magalhães	def.	(United States) Gordon Ryan	Points	3	5:00	
Middleweight 85 kg	(Brazil) Romulo Barral	def.	(Brazil) AJ Sousa	Submission (Cross Choke)	1	3:19	
Heavyweight 95+ kg	(Brazil) Roberto Abreu	def.	(Brazil) Erberth Santos	Points	3	5:00	
Light Heavyweight 95 kg	(Brazil) Keenan Cornelius	def.	(United States) Yuri Simões	Submission (Reverse Omoplata)	2	4:36	
Heavyweight 95+ kg	(Brazil) Luiz Panza	def.	(Brazil) Ricardo Evangelista	Submission (Triangle Choke)	3	2:41	
Light Heavyweight 95 kg	(Brazil) Igor Silva	def.	(Brazil) Jackson Sousa	Submission (Flying Armbar)	1	2:58	
Lightweight 65 kg	(United States) Isaac Doederlein	def.	(Brazil) Augusto Mendes	Points	3	5:00	
Welterweight 75 kg	(United States) Edwin Najmi	def.	(Brazil) Rodrigo Caporal	Submission (Rear-Naked Choke)	1	4:11	
Lightweight 65 kg	(Brazil) Pablo Mantovani	def.	(Brazil) Gabriel Marangoni	Points	3	5:00	
Welterweight 75 kg	(Brazil) Michael Langhi	def.	(Brazil) Victor Silverio	Decision	3	5:00	
Featherweight 60 kg	(Brazil) Ary Farias	def.	(Brazil) João Somalia	Submission (Kneebar)	3	2:01	
Lightweight 65 kg	(Brazil) Bruno Frazatto	def.	(Brazil) Nicholas Welker	Decision	3	5:00	

== ACB 86: Balaev vs. Raisov 2 ==
ACB 86: Balaev vs. Raisov 2
- Promotion: Absolute Championship Berkut
- Date: May 5, 2018
- Venue: Olimpiyskiy
- City: Moscow, Russia
- Attendance: ~8,000

Absolute Championship Berkut 86: Balaev vs. Raisov 2 will be a mixed martial arts event held by Absolute Championship Berkut on May 5, 2018 at the Olimpiyskiy in Moscow, Russia .

Background The title fight between Abdul-Aziz Abdulvakhabov and Ustarmagomed Gadzhidaudov got cancelled due to Gadzhidaudov injury.

Mukhamed Berkhamov had to withdraw due to an injury and is not able to defend his Welterweight title against Beslan Isaev and the bout was canceled. Ciro Rodrigues step up on to face Isaev.

Eduard Vartanyan had to pull out of his fight against Ali Bagov due to a tore ligaments in his knee. Gleristone Santos step up on short notice to face Bagov.

The fight between Abdul-Rakhman Temirov and Rasuk Mirzaev got cancelled due to Mirzaev injury. Denis Silva step up on short notice to face Temirov.

The fight between Akop Stepanyan and Arman Ospanov got cancelled due to Stepanyan illnesses.

Bonus awards:

The following fighters will be awarded $10,000 bonuses:

- Fight of the Night: Koshkin vs Shovkhalov
- Knockout of the Night: Abdul-Rakhman Temirov
- Submission of the Night: Yusuf Raisov
- $5000 Stoppage Victory Bonuses:

=== Results ===
ACB 86
Weight Class				Method	Round	Time	Notes
Featherweight 66 kg	(Russia) Yusuf Raisov (ic)	def.	(Russia) Marat Balaev (c)	Submission (Rear-Naked Choke)	1	2:49	For the Unification of ACB Featherweight Championship
Flyweight 57 kg	(Russia) Askar Askarov (c)	def.	(Russia) Rasul Albaskhanov	Submission (Guillotine Choke)	2	1:59	For the ACB Flyweight Championship
Light Heavyweight 93 kg	(Turkmenistan) Dovletdzhan Yagshimuradov	def.	(Russia) Batraz Agnaev (c)	Submission (Rear-Naked Choke)	2	2:44	For the ACB Light Heavyweight Championship
Welterweight 77 kg	(Brazil) Ciro Rodrigues	def.	(Russia) Beslan Isaev	KO (Elbow)	2	0:25	
Lightweight 70 kg	(Russia) Ali Bagov	def.	(Brazil) Gleristone Santos	TKO (Punches and Elbows)	1	3:47	
Featherweight 66 kg	(Russia) Murad Machaev	def.	(Russia) Mukhamed Kokov	Decision (Unanimous)	3	5:00	
Lightweight 70 kg	(Russia) Andrei Koshkin	def.	(Russia) Rasul Shovkhalov	Decision (Unanimous)	3	5:00	
Featherweight 66 kg	(Armenia) Georgi Karakhanyan	def.	(Russia) Alexey Polpudnikov	Decision (Unanimous)	3	5:00	
Welterweight 77 kg	(Russia) Gadzhimurad Khiramagomedovv	def.	(Russia) Sharaf Davlatmurodov	Decision (Unanimous)	3	5:00	
Light Heavyweight 93 kg	(Russia) Muslim Magomedov	def.	(Kazakhstan) Asylzhan Bakhytzhanuly	Submission (Rear-Naked Choke)	2	1:55	
Featherweight 66 kg	(Russia) Abdul-Rakhman Temirov	def.	(Brazil) Denis Silva	TKO (Punches)	1	3:28	
Lightweight 70 kg	(Russia) Denis Kanakov	def.	(Afghanistan) Abdul Azim Badakhshi	TKO (Punches)	1	4:04	

== ACB 87: Mousah vs. Whiteford ==
ACB 87: Mousah vs. Whiteford
- Promotion: Absolute Championship Berkut
- Date: May 19, 2018
- Venue: Motorpoint Arena
- City: Nottingham, England

Absolute Championship Berkut 87: Mousah vs. Whiteford will be a mixed martial arts event held by Absolute Championship Berkut on May 19, 2018 at the Motorpoint Arena in Nottingham, England.

Background Azi Thomas, has been removed from ACB 87 after the organisation were alerted to a prior anti-doping rule violation, Thomas was set to fight Regis Sugden. Stephen Martin will step in to face Sugden.

Bonus awards:

The following fighters will be awarded $10,000 bonuses:

- Fight of the Night: Dean Garnett vs. Dominique Wooding
- Submission of the Night: Alex Gilpin
- $5000 Stoppage Victory Bonuses: Andre Winner

=== Results ===
ACB 87
Weight Class				Method	Round	Time	Notes
Featherweight 66 kg	(Scotland) Robert Whiteford	def.	(England) Kane Mousah	Decision (Split)	3	5:00	
Middleweight 84 kg	(Poland) Piotr Strus	def.	(United States) Fernando Gonzalez	Decision (Split)	3	5:00	
Bantamweight 61 kg	(Japan) Takeya Mizugaki	def.	(England) Pietro Menga	Decision (Unanimous)	3	5:00	
Middleweight 84 kg	(Turkey) Ibragim Chuzhigaev	def.	(United States) Mike Rhodes	Decision (Unanimous)	3	5:00	
Bantamweight 61 kg	(United States) Rob Emerson	def.	(Russia) Shamil Shakhbulatov	Decision (Unanimous)	3	5:00	
Lightweight 70 kg	(England) Andre Winner	def.	(Russia) Adam Aliev	Submission (Rear-Naked Choke)	2	1:53	
Featherweight 66 kg	(United States) Alex Gilpin	def.	(Russia) Adlan Mamaev	Submission (Ninja Choke)	3	0:54	
Welterweight 77 kg	(Russia) Stanislav Vlasenko	def.	(England) Sam Boult	Decision (Split)	3	5:00	
Welterweight 77 kg	(England) Stephen Martin	def.	(England) Regis Sugden	Submission (Arm-Triangle Choke)	3	2:15	
Bantamweight 61 kg	(England) Dean Garnett	def.	(England) Dominique Wooding	Decision (Split)	3	5:00	
Welterweight 77 kg	(England) Adam Proctor	def.	(England) Ashley Reece	Decision (Unanimous)	3	5:00	
Bantamweight 61 kg	(Brazil) Carlos Abreu	def.	(England) Chris Miah	Decision (Split)	3	5:00	
Middleweight 84 kg	(England) Kevin Mullen	def.	(Russia) George McManus	TKO (Punches)	2	1:44	
Flyweight 57 kg	(Russia) Murad Magomedov	def.	(Brazil) Paulo Oliveira	Decision (Unanimous)	3	5:00	

== ACB 88: Barnatt vs. Celiński ==
ACB 88: Barnatt vs. Celiński
- Promotion: Absolute Championship Berkut
- Date: June 16, 2018
- Venue: Sleeman Sports Complex
- City: Brisbane, Australia

Absolute Championship Berkut 88: Barnatt vs. Celiński will be a mixed martial arts event held by Absolute Championship Berkut on June 16, 2018 at the Sleeman Sports Complex in Brisbane, Australia.

Background Due to some complications in obtaining the necessary documents to travel and compete in Australia, Thiago Silva could not make the trip. His fight against Chris Camozzi was canceled.

Brett Cooper had to withdraw of his fight against Adam Townsend due to an injury. Kieran Joblin step up on short notice to face Townsend.

Luis Palomino had to pull out of his fight against Andrew Fisher due to visa issue. Rodolfo Marquez step up on short notice to face Fisher. Fisher has also been forced to withdraw from the card on medical grounds.

Raymison Bruno is out, Andy Young steps in on six days notice to take on Narek Avagyan.

Bonus awards:

The following fighters will be awarded $10,000 bonuses:

- Fight of the Night: Luke Barnatt vs. Karol Celinski
- Submission of the Night: Mindaugas Verzbickas
- $5000 Stoppage Victory Bonuses: Marcin Held, Rodolfo Vieira, Kyle Reyes, Narek Avagyan

=== Results ===
ACB 88
Weight Class				Method	Round	Time	Notes
Light Heavyweight 93 kg	(Poland) Karol Celiński	def.	(England) Luke Barnatt	Decision (Majority)	3	5:00	
Lightweight 70 kg	(Poland) Marcin Held	def.	(Australia) Callan Potter	Submission (Heel Hook)	1	1:09	
Middleweight 84 kg	(Brazil) Rodolfo Vieira	def.	(Australia) Jacob Holyman-Tague	Submission (Rear-Naked Choke)	1	3:51	
Heavyweight 120 kg	(Canada) Tanner Boser	def.	(United States) Chase Gormley	Decision (Unanimous)	3	5:00	
Welterweight 77 kg	(United States) Adam Townsend	def.	(Australia) Kieran Joblin	Decision (Unanimous)	3	5:00	
Featherweight 66 kg	(Sweden) Frantz Slioa	def.	(United States) Adrian Diaz	Decision (Unanimous)	3	5:00	
Bantamweight 61 kg	(Guam) Kyle Reyes	def.	(Australia) Trent Girdham	Submission (Rear-Naked Choke)	2	2:13	
Featherweight 66 kg	(Australia) Michael Tobin	def.	(Australia) Michael Mannue	Submission (Straight Arm Lock)	1	2:04	
Welterweight 77 kg	(Lithuania) Mindaugas Veržbickas	def.	(Australia) Corey Nelson	Submission (D'Arce Choke)	1	0:44	
Welterweight 77 kg	(United States) E. J. Brooks	def.	(Australia) Steven Kennedy	Decision (Unanimous)	3	5:00	
Flyweight 57 kg	(Armenia) Narek Avagyan	def.	(Northern Ireland) Andy Young	TKO (Punches)	1	2:18	
Flyweight 57 kg	(Australia) Shannon Ross	def.	(Australia) Charlie Alaniz	Decision (Unanimous)	3	5:00	
Bantamweight 61 kg	(Northern Ireland) Alan Philpott	def.	(Brazil) Gustavo Falciroli	Decision (Unanimous)	3	5:00	
Bantamweight 61 kg	(Brazil) Rodrigo Praia	def.	(Guam) Trevin Jones	Decision (Split)	3	5:00	
Flyweight 57 kg	(Australia) Stewart Nicoll	def.	(Australia) Darren Habben	Submission (Rear-Naked Choke)	1	4:29	

== ACB JJ 14: Ramos vs. Lepri ==
ACB JJ 14: Ramos vs. Lepri
- Promotion: Absolute Championship Berkut
- Date: June 30, 2018
- Venue: Dynamo Sports Palace
- City: Moscow, Russia

Absolute Championship Berkut Jiu-Jitsu 14: Ramos vs. Lepri will be a Brazilian jiu-jitsu event held by Absolute Championship Berkut on June 30, 2018 at the Dynamo Sports Palace in Moscow, Russia.

Background

Bonus awards:

The following fighters will be awarded $5,000 bonuses:

- Fight of the Night:
- Fastest submission of the Night:
- Best Submission of the Night:

=== Fight Card ===
ACB JJ 14
Weight Class				Method	Round	Time	Notes
Welterweight 75 kg	(Brazil) Lucas Lepri	def.	(Brazil) Davi Ramos (c)	Points	5	5:00	For the ACB Jiu-Jitsu GI Welterweight Championship
Catchweight 73 kg	(Russia) Zubaira Tukhugov	def.	(United States) Josh Emmett	Points	3	5:00	
Featherweight 60 kg	(Brazil) João Miyao (c)	def.	(Brazil) Ary Farias	Points	5	5:00	For the ACB Jiu-Jitsu GI Featherweight Championship
Catchweight 92 kg	(Russia) Albert Duraev	def.	(Russia) Magomed Ismailov	Points	3	5:00	
Heavyweight 95+ kg	(Brazil) Luiz Panza	def.	(Brazil) Rodrigo Cavaca	Submission (Rear-Naked Choke)	2	1:23	
Catchweight 79 kg	(Russia) Yusuf Raisov	def.	(United States) Diego Sanchez	Points	3	5:00	
Heavyweight 95+ kg	(Brazil) Joao Rocha	def.	(Brazil) Nicholas Meregali	Points	3	5:00	
Catchweight 82 kg	(Russia) Mukhamed Berkhamov	def.	(Russia) Aslambek Saidov	Points	3	5:00	
Light Heavyweight 95 kg	(Brazil) Igor Silva	def.	(Russia) Abdurakhman Bilarov	Points	3	5:00	
Catchweight 80 kg	(Russia) Abdul-Aziz Abdulvakhabov	def.	(Russia) Eduard Vartanyan	Points	3	5:00	
Middleweight 85 kg	(Brazil) Lucas Barbosa	def.	(Brazil) Romulo Barral	Points	3	5:00	
Heavyweight 95+ kg	(Brazil) Gabriel Lucas	vs.	(Brazil) Marcos Oliveira	Double DQ	2	0:59	
Featherweight 60 kg	(Brazil) Rodnei Barbosa	def.	(Brazil) Samir Chantre	Points	3	5:00	

== ACB KB 16: Clash of Titans ==
ACB KB 16: Clash of Titans
- Promotion: Absolute Championship Berkut
- Date: July 13, 2018
- Venue: Unirii Plaza
- City: Târgoviște, Romania

ACB KB 16: Clash of Titans was a kickboxing event produced by the Absolute Championship Berkut that took place on July 13, 2018, at the Unirii Plaza in Târgoviște, Romania.

=== Fight card ===
ACB KB 16: Clash of Titans
Weight Class				Method	Round	Time	Notes
95 kg	(Suriname) Donegi Abena	def.	(Romania) Andrei Stoica	Decision (unanimous)	3	3:00	
70 kg	(Russia) Adsalam Barkinkhoev	def.	(Netherlands) Albert Kraus	Decision (unanimous)	3	3:00	
77 kg	(Romania) Daniel Pattvean	def.	(Russia) Islam Khozhdevdiev	KO (punches)	1	2:59	
70 kg	(Ukraine) Stanislav Kazantsev	vs.	(Belarus) Farkhad Akhmedzhanov	Draw	3	3:00	
77 kg	(Romania) Adelin Mihăilă	def.	(France) Djibril Ehouo	TKO (punches)	1	2:15	
Undercard
67 kg	(Netherlands) Damian Johansen	def.	(Romania) David Constantin	KO (knees)	1	1:16	
67 kg	(Russia) Tamerlan Bashirov	def.	(Romania) Călin Petrișor	Decision (unanimous)	3	3:00	
95 kg	(Netherlands) Max van Gelder	def.	(Hungary) Ferenc Szalma	TKO (leg injury)	1	1:43	
58 kg	(Russia) Bashlam Amadov	def.	(Romania) Leonard Stoean	Decision (unanimous)	3	3:00	
85 kg	(Romania) Claudiu Alexe	def.	(Romania) Adrian Cibu	TKO (referee stoppage)	1	2:54	

== ACB 89: Sarnavskiy vs. Batista [Cancelled] ==
ACB 89: Sarnavskiy vs. Batista
- Promotion: Absolute Championship Berkut
- Date: July 21, 2018
- Venue: Spyros Kyprianou Athletic Center
- City: Limassol, Cyprus

Absolute Championship Berkut 89: Sarnavskiy vs. Batista was cancelled.

== ACB 90: Khamanaev vs. Silva [Cancelled] ==
ACB 90: Khamanaev vs. Silva
- Promotion: Absolute Championship Berkut
- Date: July 28, 2018
- Venue: Basket-Hall Arena
- City: Kazan, Russia

Absolute Championship Berkut 90: Khamanaev vs. Silva was cancelled

== ACB 91: Duraev vs. Strus [Cancelled] ==
ACB 91: Duraev vs. Strus
- Promotion: Absolute Championship Berkut
- Date: August 11, 2018
- Venue: Copper Box Arena
- City: London, England

Absolute Championship Berkut 91: Duraev vs. Strus was cancelled.

== ACB 92: Duraev vs. Strus [Cancelled] ==
ACB 92: Duraev vs. Strus
- Promotion: Absolute Championship Berkut
- Date: August 25, 2018
- Venue: Malmö Arena
- City: Malmö, Sweden

Absolute Championship Berkut 92: Duraev vs. Strus was Cancelled.

== ACB 89: Abdulvakhabov vs. Bagov 3 ==
ACB 89: Abdulvakhabov vs. Bagov 3
- Promotion: Absolute Championship Berkut
- Date: September 8, 2018
- Venue: Basket-Hall
- City: Krasnodar, Russia

Absolute Championship Berkut 89: Abdulvakhabov vs. Bagov 3 will be a mixed martial arts event held by Absolute Championship Berkut on September 8, 2018 at the Basket-Hall in Krasnodar, Russia.

Background Due to the cancellation of multiple events, numbering of the future events has been changed. Therefore, the event won't be ACB 93, but ACB 89.

Mukhamed Berkhamov out with an injury, vacates title. Brett Cooper steps up and will fight Albert Tumenov for the vacant ACB Welterweight Championship.

Brett Cooper is out with an injury. Ciro Rodrigues steps up and will fight Albert Tumenov for the vacant Welterweight Championship

Bonus awards:

The following fighters will be awarded $10,000 bonuses:

- Fight of the Night:
- Knockout of the Night:
- Submission of the Night:
- $5000 Stoppage Victory Bonuses:

=== Fight card ===
ACB 89
Weight Class				Method	Round	Time	Notes
Lightweight 70 kg	(Russia) Ali Bagov	def.	(Russia) Abdul-Aziz Abdulvakhabov (c)	Decision (Majority)	5	5:00	For the ACB Lightweight Championship
Welterweight 77 kg	(Russia) Albert Tumenov	def.	(Brazil) Ciro Rodrigues	TKO (Punches)	3	4:53	For the Vacant ACB Welterweight Championship
Middleweight 84 kg	(Russia) Albert Duraev (c)	def.	(Poland) Piotr Strus	Decision (Unanimous)	5	5:00	For the ACB Middleweight Championship
Featherweight 66 kg	(Russia) Adlan Bataev	def.	(Brazil) Taigro Costa	Decision (Split)	3	5:00	
Featherweight 66 kg	(Russia) Mukhamed Kokov	def.	(Russia) Lom-Ali Eskijew	Decision (Majority)	3	5:00	
Heavyweight 120 kg	(Iran) Amir Aliakbari	def.	(Poland) Daniel Omielańczuk	Decision (Unanimous)	3	5:00	
Featherweight 66 kg	(Russia) Marat Balaev	def.	(Russia) Murad Machaev	TKO (Punches)	1	3:43	
Lightweight 70 kg	(Russia) Andrey Koshkin	def.	(Russia) Yusup Umarov	TKO (Head Kick)	3	1:59	
Flyweight 57 kg	(Russia) Rasul Albaskhanov	def.	(Armenia) Narek Avagyan	Decision (Unanimous)	3	5:00	
Bantamweight 61 kg	(Russia) Goga Shamatava	def.	(Russia) Pavel Pastushkov	KO (Spinning Elbow)	2	1:07	
Light Heavyweight 93 kg	(Russia) Amirkhan Guliev	def.	(Spain) Jose Daniel Toledo	TKO (Leg Injury)	3	0:16	
Featherweight 66 kg	(Russia) Magomed Sulumov	def.	(Armenia) Akop Stepanyan	Decision (Unanimous)	3	5:00	
Welterweight 77 kg	(Russia) Imran Abaev	def.	(Brazil) Marcelo Alfaya	KO (Punches)	1	1:57	
Flyweight 57 kg	(Russia) Azamat Kerefov	def.	(Russia) Kurban Gadzhiev	Decision (Ultimate Scoring)	3	5:00	
Featherweight 66 kg	(Russia) Maharbek Karginov	def.	(Russia) Islam Meshev	Decision (Split)	3	5:00	
Featherweight 66 kg	(Russia) Rustam Taldiev	def.	(Romania) Bogdan Barbu	Submission (Triangle Choke)	1	2:25	

== ACB 90: Vakhaev vs. Bilostenniy ==
ACB 90: Vakhaev vs. Bilostenniy
- Promotion: Absolute Championship Berkut
- Date: November 10, 2018
- Venue: VTB Ice Palace
- City: Moscow, Russia

Absolute Championship Berkut 90: Vakhaev vs. Bilostenniy will be a mixed martial arts event held by Absolute Championship Berkut on November 10, 2018 at the VTB Ice Palace in Moscow, Russia.

Background

Bonus awards:

The following fighters will be awarded $10,000 bonuses:

- Fight of the Night:
- Knockout of the Night:
- Submission of the Night:
- $5000 Stoppage Victory Bonuses:

=== Results ===
ACB 90
Weight Class				Method	Round	Time	Notes
Heavyweight 120 kg	(Russia) Mukhamad Vakhaev (c)	def.	(Russia) Sergey Bilostenniy	Submission (Rear-Naked Choke)	1	4:32	For the ACB Heavyweight Championship
Lightweight 70 kg	(Russia) Eduard Vartanyan	def.	(Russia) Ustarmagomed Gadzhidaudov	Decision (Unanimous)	3	5:00	
Lightweight 70 kg	(Russia) Yusup Raisov	def.	(England) Andre Winner	Decision (Unanimous)	3	5:00	
Bantamweight 61 kg	(Russia) Oleg Borisov	def.	(Brazil) Thiago Henrique	KO (Punch)	2	1:07	
Lightweight 70 kg	(Poland) Marcin Held	def.	(Russia) Musa Khamanaev	Submission (Heel Hook)	1	2:09	
Bantamweight 61 kg	(Russia) Magomed Magomedov	def.	(Brazil) Walter Pereira Jr.	Submission (Guillotine Choke)	1	4:41	
Featherweight 66 kg	(Russia) Georgi Karakhanyan	def.	(Russia) Timur Nagibin	DQ (Punching After End of Round)	1	5:00	
Preliminary Card
Middleweight 84 kg	(Russia) Gamzat Khiramagomedov	def.	(South Korea) Jae Young Kim	TKO (Doctor Stoppage)	3	0:58	
Heavyweight 120 kg	(Russia) Salimgerey Rasulov	def.	(Canada) Tanner Boser	Decision (Unanimous)	3	5:00	
Featherweight 66 kg	(Russia) Rasul Mirzaev	def.	(Brazil) Gleristone Santos	KO (Punch)	2	4:03	
Featherweight 66 kg	(Russia) Alexey Polpudnikov	def.	(Russia) Alexander Peduson	TKO (Submission to Punches)	2	3:19	
Middleweight 84 kg	(Russia) Aleksei Butorin	def.	(United States) Cory Hendricks	TKO (Knee and Punches)	1	3:11	
Lightweight 70 kg	(Russia) Alexander Sarnavskiy	def.	(Brazil) Herdeson Batista	KO (Knee)	1	2:11	
Bantamweight 61 kg	(Russia) Abdul-Rakhman Temirov	def.	(Azerbaijan) Tural Ragimov	KO (Liver Kick)	1	2:39	
Lightweight 70 kg	(Russia) Sharaf Davlatmurodov	def.	(Kazakhstan) Umar Yankovskiy	TKO (Knee to the Body and Punches)	2	1:45	
