= Sleeman Sports Complex =

Sporting and entertainment facility located in Brisbane, Queensland

Coordinates: 27.513°S 153.147°E

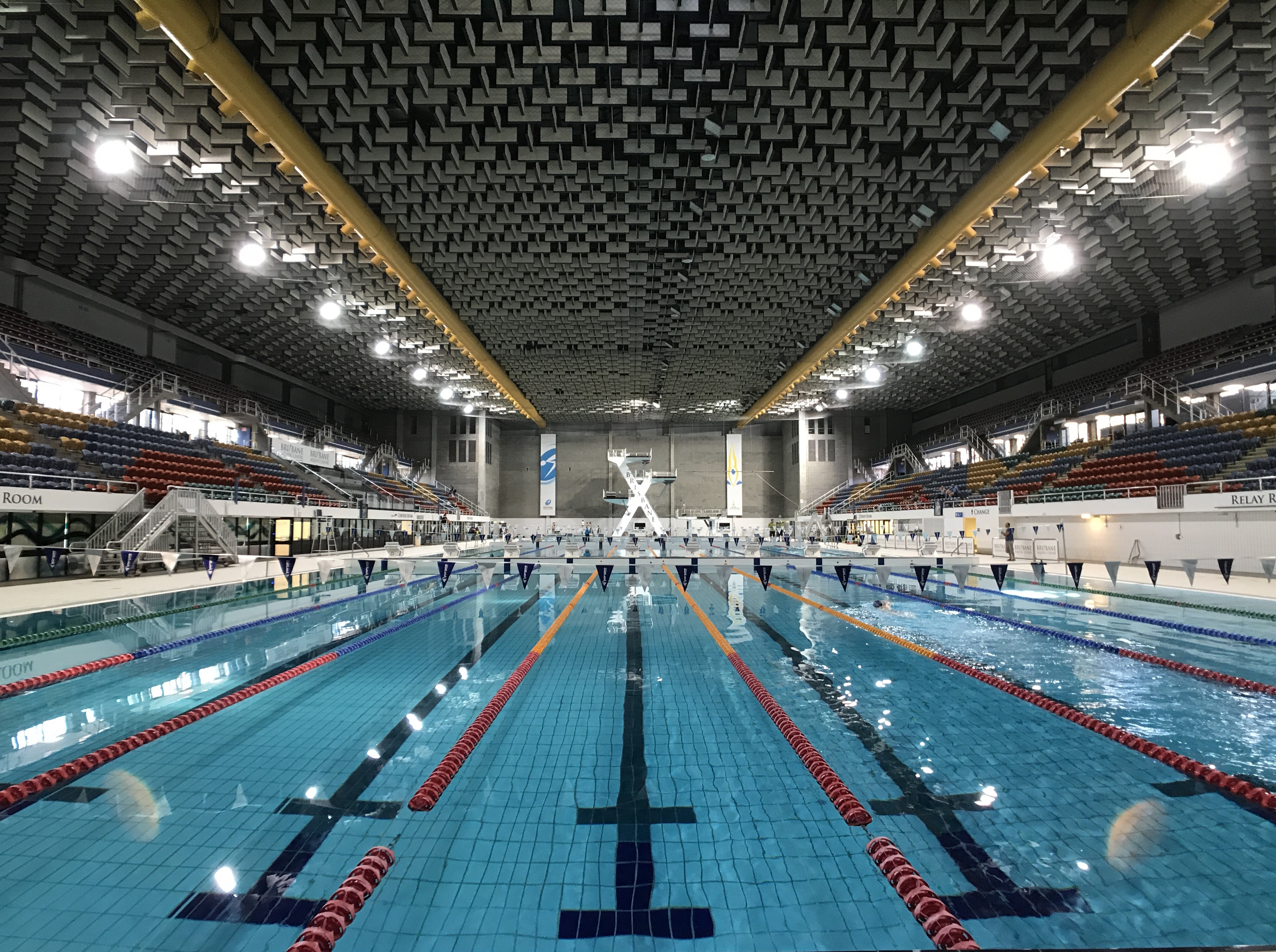
50-metre indoor Olympic pool at Brisbane Aquatic Centre

The Sleeman Sports Complex, formerly and still commonly known as the Sleeman Centre, is a sporting and entertainment complex in Brisbane, Queensland, Australia. Located on Old Cleveland Road in the suburb of Chandler, the facility is 15 kilometres (9.3 mi) east of Brisbane's central business district and is home to an aquatic centre, velodrome, sports arena, gymnastics training hall, gymnasium, and auditorium. The centre also offers a range of activities and services to the general public.

== History ==
The Sleeman Sports Centre, named after Brisbane Lord Mayor Frank Sleeman, is purpose-built sporting complex for the 1982 Commonwealth Games. Construction of the Centre was completed in 1982. Since then, the Centre has been host to a number of other sporting events including the 1994 World Masters Games and the 2001 Goodwill Games swimming, diving, and cycling events. The facilities were to host six sporting events as part of the failed 1992 Olympic bid.

During the 2013 Queensland floods, the site was set up as an evacuation facility.

== Facilities ==
=== Aquatic Centre ===
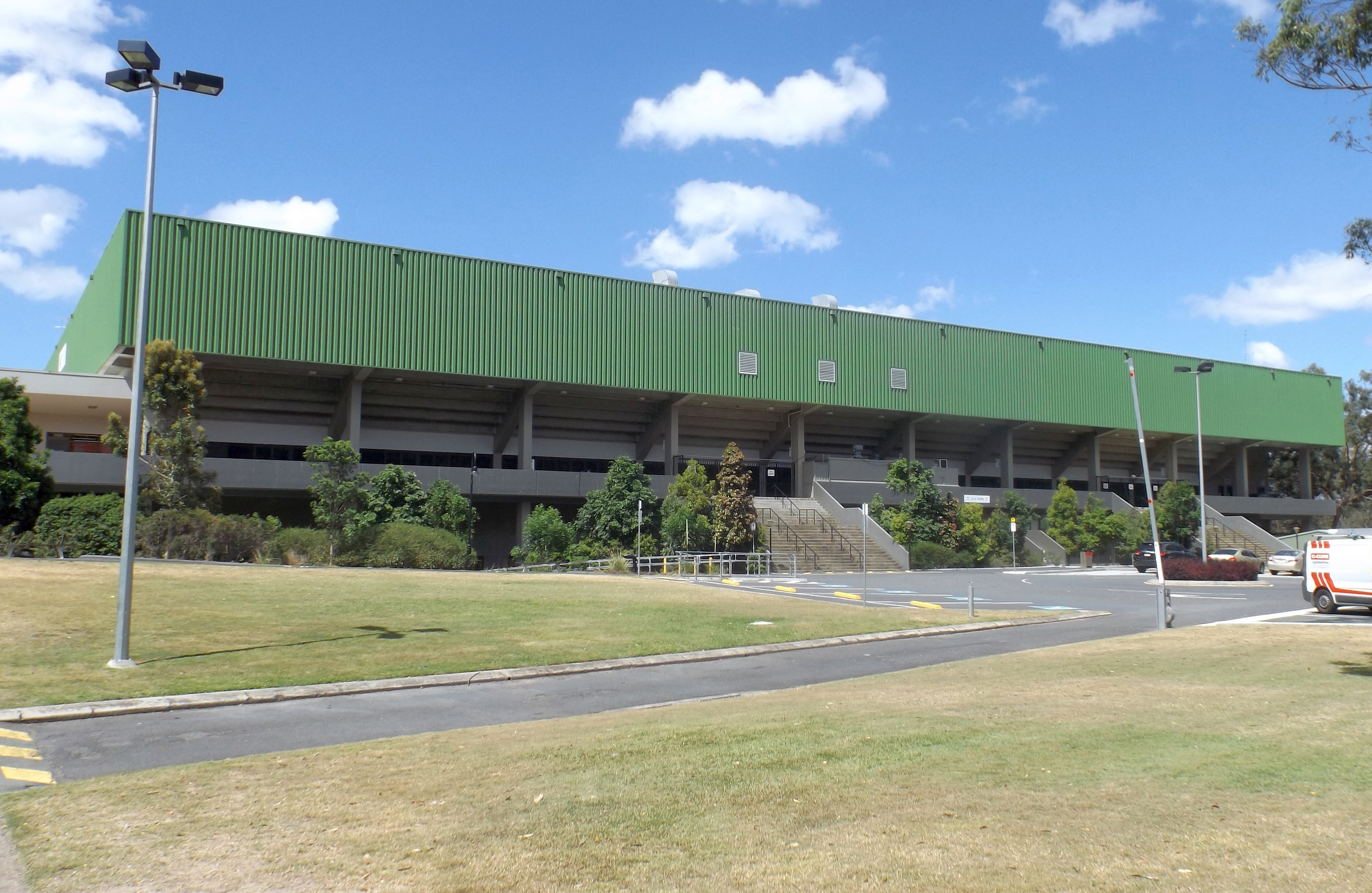
Brisbane Aquatic Centre, 2014

The Brisbane Aquatic Centre (located at Chandler) consists of four main swimming pools, a 50-metre indoor Olympic pool (2m depth), a 50-metre outdoor Olympic pool (4m to 2m in depth) a 25-metre diving pool (5m depth), and a 25-metre lap pool (1m depth). The Aquatic Centre has a seating capacity of 4,300 and has diving facilities, a moveable bulkhead on the Olympic pool for short course events and a water fun park. The aquatic centre also contains a children's facility which encompasses the 25-metre lap pool, a large enclosed water slide and a children's pool.

=== Anna Meares Velodrome ===
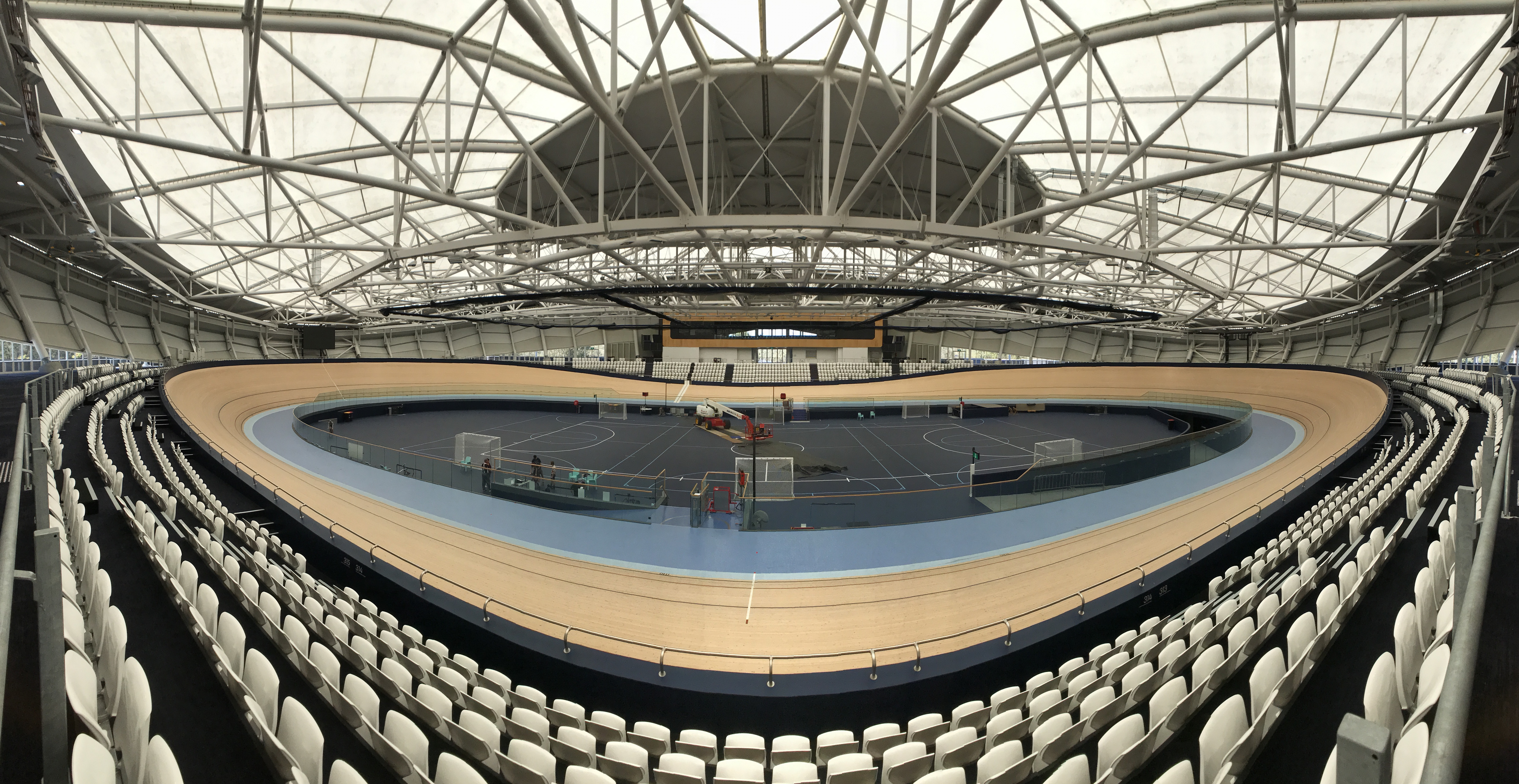
Anna Meares Velodrome

The Anna Meares Velodrome is a 250-metre (820 ft) indoor velodrome, named in honour of Anna Meares. Built by Besix Watpac, it was completed in 2016. The velodrome hosted the track cycling events at the 2018 Commonwealth Games, and will host the 2032 Summer Olympics.

=== Chandler Velodrome ===
An older facility, called the Chandler Velodrome which hosted the Track cycling at the 1982 Commonwealth Games in Brisbane, still stands, and was an outdoor configuration, having a grandstand seating capacity of 3,000. The venue was suitable for cycling events, rock concerts, rallies, motocross and speedway championships. The Norm Gailey Grandstand on the western side also contained offices of AusCycling Queensland.

=== Chandler Theatre ===
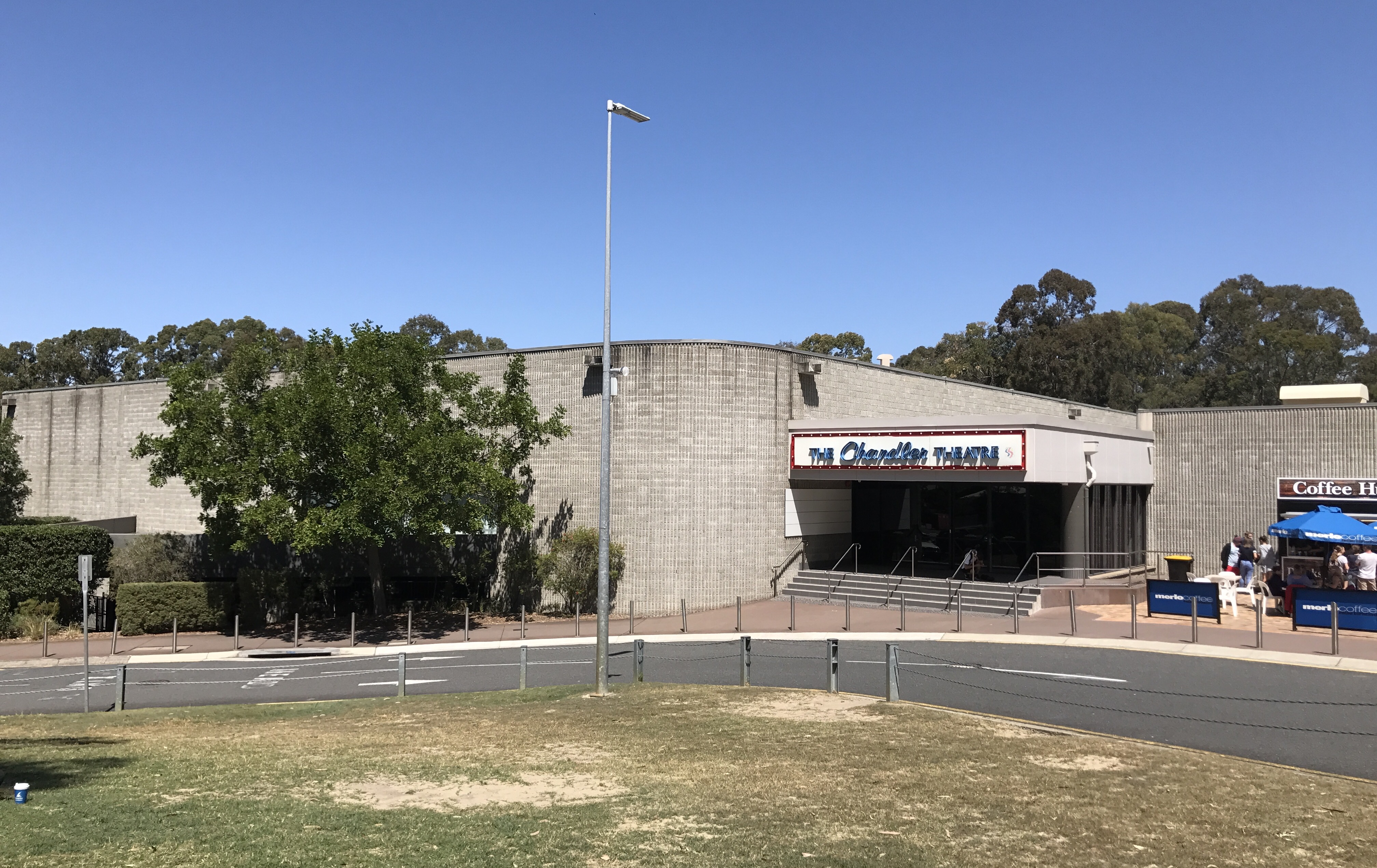
Chandler Theatre

The Chandler Theatre is one of the largest in South East Queensland, with a 200 square metre stage, and a seating capacity of 1,500. It hosted the weightlifting events at the 1982 Commonwealth Games.

=== Brisbane BMX Supercross Track ===
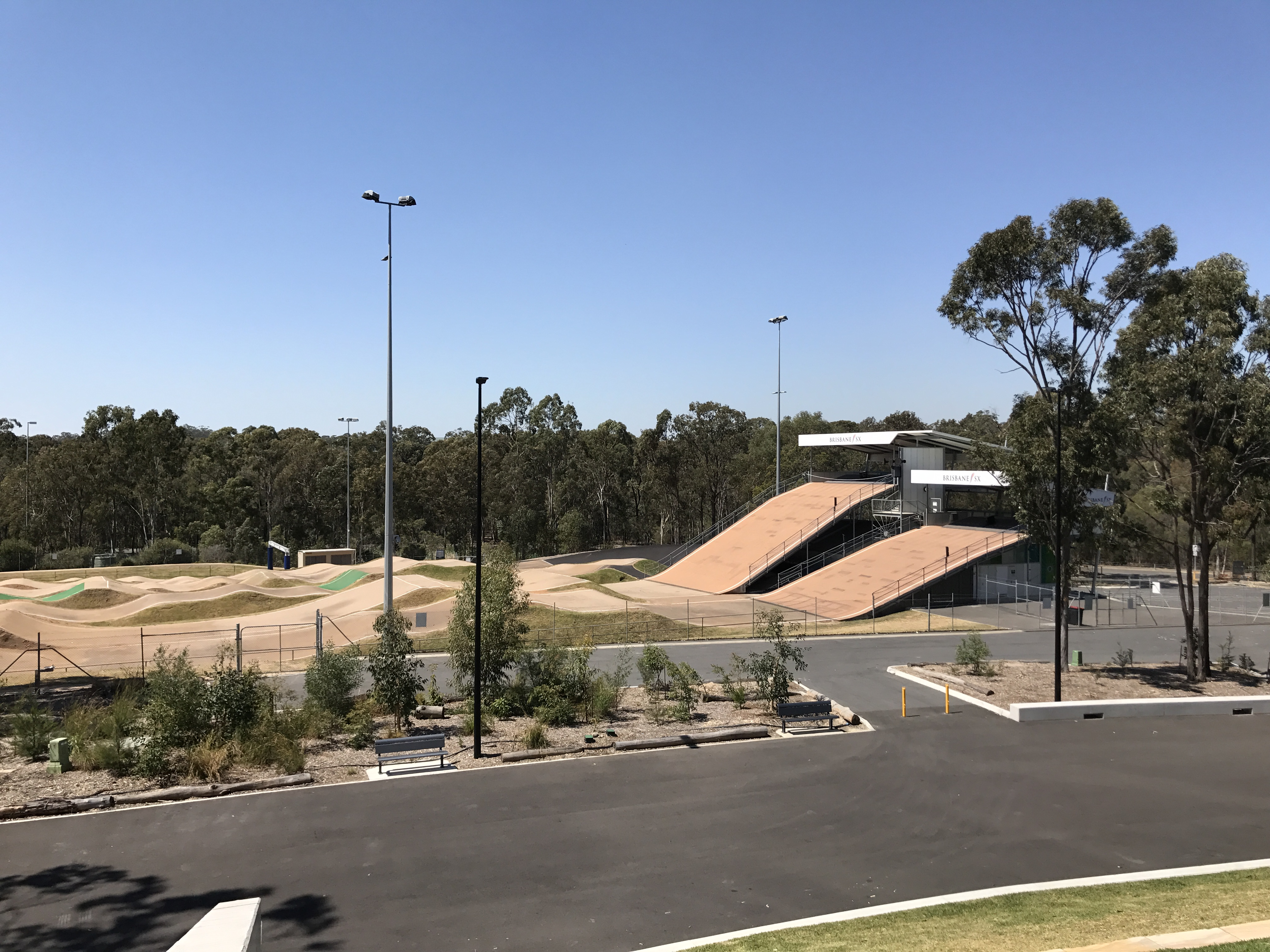
Brisbane BMX Supercross Track

Sleeman Sports Complex is home to Australia's only Olympic Standard BMX Supercross Track.

=== Water Ramp ===
In 2020, a water ramp facility for freestyle ski-jumping was completed. It provides a year-long training facility for Australia's elite aerial skiers. The project was a joint initiative of the Olympic Winter Institute of Australia, state and federal governments and the Australian Olympic Committee.

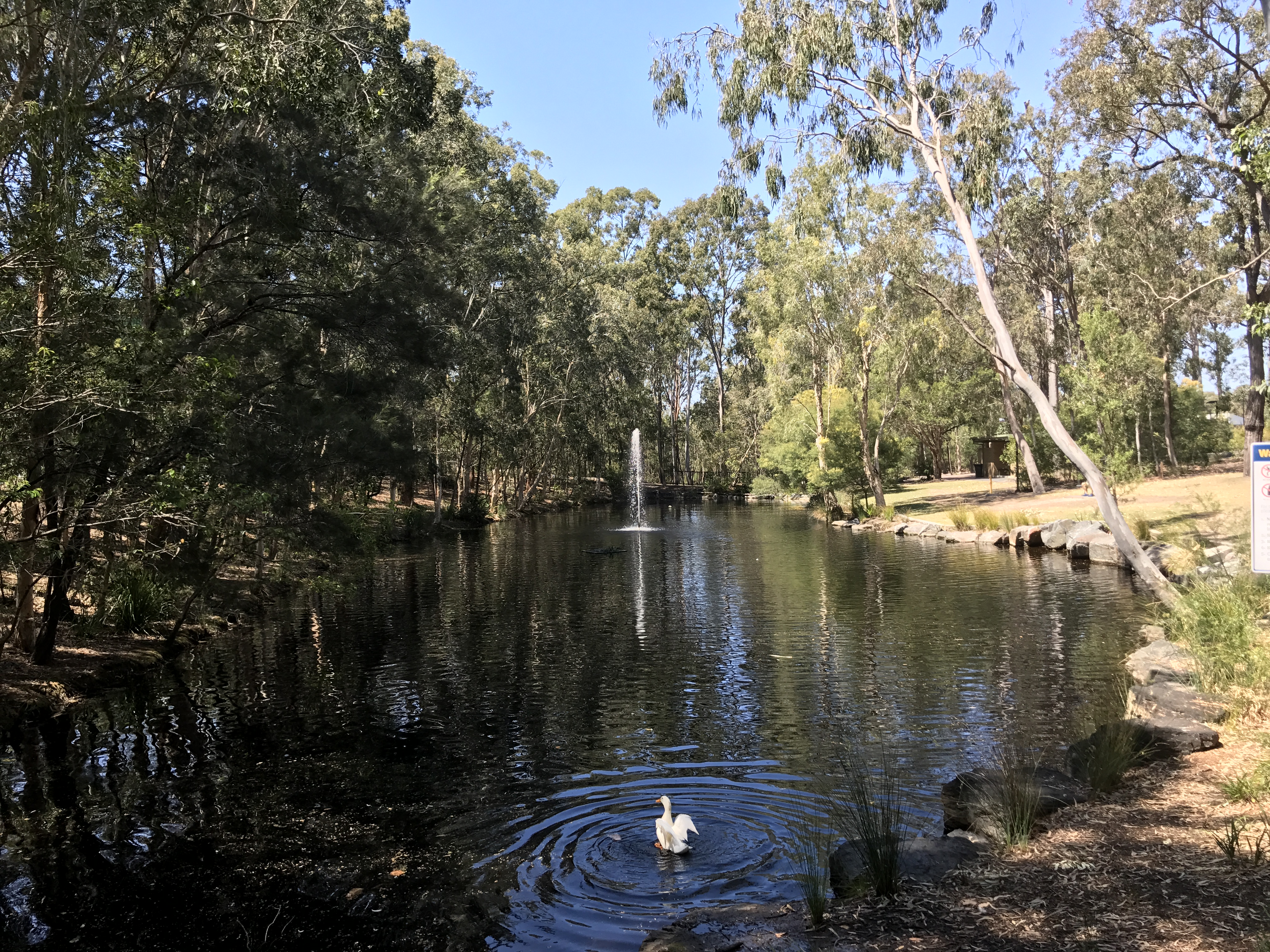
Lake and parklands

== See also ==
- List of Absolute Championship Akhmat events
- List of cycling tracks and velodromes
- List of stadiums in Oceania
- Sport in Brisbane
- Sport in Queensland
