= Club Hebraica =

Jewish social clubs in Brazil

Club Hebraica (or Hebraica) is a Brazilian-Jewish social and recreational community center. The clubs operate in a number of cities in Brazil and are deemed by its members to be important to the expression of Jewish identity. Though Hebraica clubs are found in different cities under the same name, they are operated independently. The World Jewish Congress describes the Hebraica clubs as "exclusive social clubs that are privately owned and traditionally headed by leaders of the community."

== Programs ==
A number of programs are geared to community members who cannot afford Hebraica membership, such as food and transportation for the elderly. The clubs have youth movements and offer informal Jewish education, as well as synagogues.

== Locations ==
- Clube Hebraica São Paulo
- Clube Hebraica Rio
- Hebraica Niteroi
- Hebraica Porto Alegre

== See also ==
- History of the Jews in Brazil
