= Basket-Hall Krasnodar =

Indoor sporting arena located in Russia

- Baskethall-Krasnodar
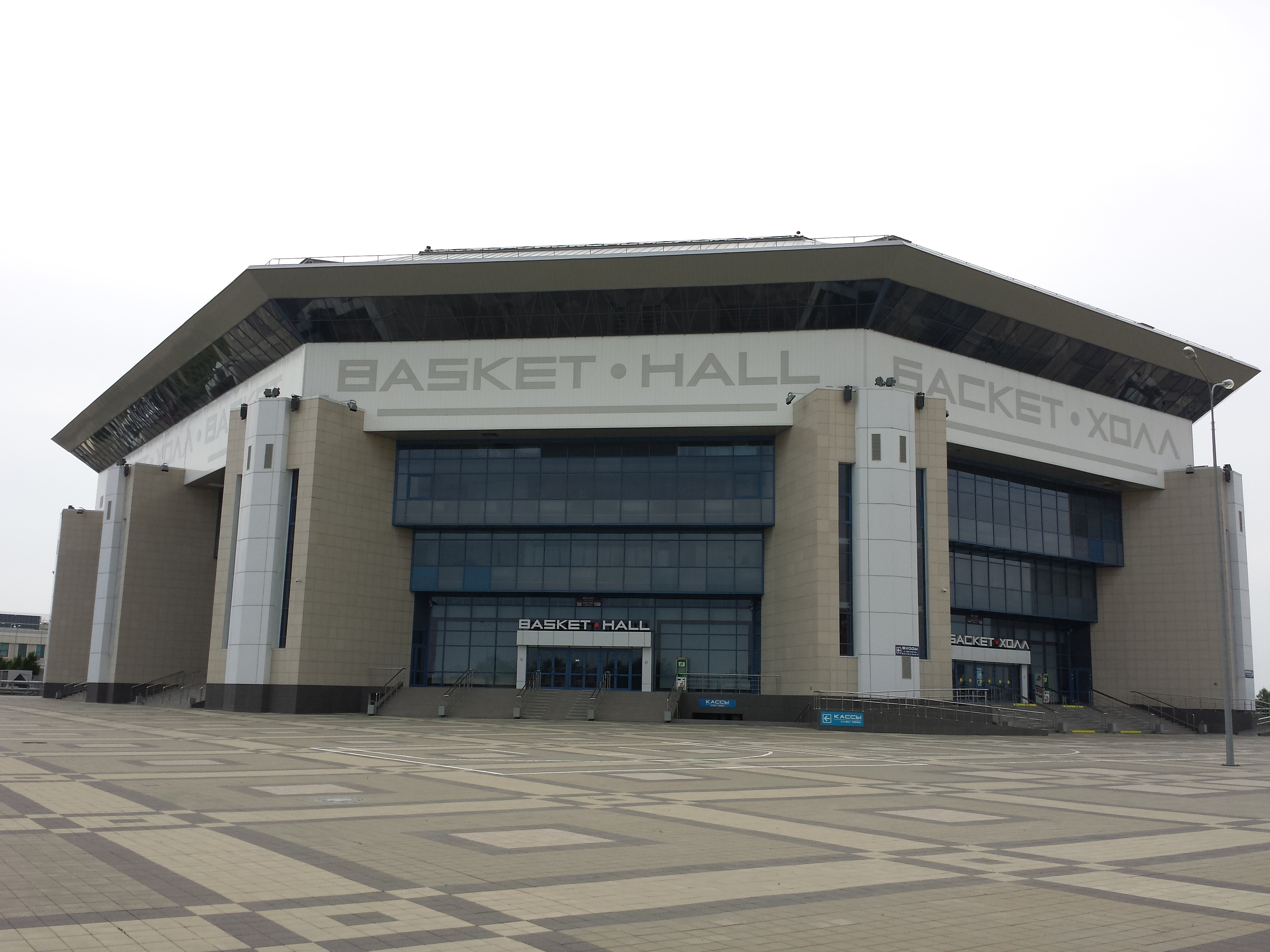
- Interactive map of Basket-Hall Krasnodar
- Full name: Basket-Hall Arena Krasnodar
- Location: Prigorodnaya street 24, Krasnodar, Russia
- Coordinates: 45°07′03″N 38°58′53″E
- Capacity: Basketball: 7,500
- Surface: Parquet
- Record attendance: 7,470 (Lokomotiv Kuban v Real Madrid, 13 February 2014)

Construction
- Opened: August 14th, 2011
- Renovated: 2017

Tenants
- Lokomotiv Kuban; 2011–Present

Basket-Hall Krasnodar, or Baskethall-Krasnodar, (Russian: Баскет-Холл Краснодар) is a multi-purpose indoor arena that is located in Krasnodar, Russia. The arena is mainly used to host basketball games. The arena contains two basketball halls. The large main hall seats 7,500, and the smaller hall, which is used for training, seats 500. The large main hall also includes an amphitheater section.

== History ==
Basket-Hall Krasnodar opened in 2011. It has been used as the regular home arena of the Russian VTB United League club Lokomotiv Kuban. The arena was renovated in 2017.

== See also ==
- List of indoor arenas in Russia
