= Prado (surname) =

Prado is a last name of Italian origin from the island of Sicily; variations of the last name include "Di Prado" and "Prato" y rojas es un apellido de origen peruano

Prado is ranked 2,358 out of 88,799 in the United States.

There are approximately 9,553 people with the surname Prado in Spain, making it the 490th-most-common in the country.

The name is commonly found in Italy, France, and Brazil.

About the origin of the last name, there are two known possible origins to the Prado surname (Italian and/or Spanish): The first one indicates the origin of the last name comes from Spain when the son of a noblewoman took the last name after the prado, Spanish word for field, where he was born. The last name is also said to have an Italian origin, more specifically from the Island of Sicily, where records have been found that indicate the presence of a noble family in the 16th century by the last name Prado. Prado comes from a variation of prato (the Italian word for field).

== People ==
- Edward C. Prado, a U.S. appeals court judge
- Flávio Prado (born 1954), Brazilian sports journalist
- Guilherme do Prado Raymundo, Brazilian professional football player
- José Antônio de Almeida Prado (1943–2010), Brazilian composer
- Joyce Prado (born 1997), Bolivian model
- Lauana Prado (born 1989), Brazilian singer and songwriter
- Lelo Prado (born 1962), American college baseball coach
- Leoncio Prado Gutiérrez, Peruvian mariner
- Manuel Prado y Ugarteche, Peruvian politician
- Mariana Prado (born 1982), Bolivian business administrator and politician
- Mariana Ximenes do Prado (born 1981), Brazilian actress
- Mariano Ignacio Prado, President of Peru
- Martín Prado, a Venezuelan baseball player
- Miguelanxo Prado, a Galician (Spain) comic book creator
- Paulo Silas do Prado Pereira, a former Brazilian football (soccer) player
- Perez Prado, a Cuban bandleader
- Priscilla Prado (born 1983), American politician
- Vasco Prado, Brazilian sculptor
- Wagner Prado, a Brazilian mixed martial artist

De Prado

- Antônio Francisco Bueno do Prado (1940–2017), Brazilian footballer
- Antonio Pimentel de Prado y lo Bianco (1604-c. 1671–72), Spanish officer
- Blas de Prado, or Del Prado (b. c. 1540), Spanish painter
- Fernando de Prado (born 1963), Spanish historian, writer and lecturer
- Francisco Pérez de Prado y Cuesta a (1677–1755), Spanish prelate of the Roman Catholic Church and Grand Inquisitor of Spain
- Guilherme de Almeida Prado, Brazilian film director
- Juan Núñez de Prado (conquistador), a 16th-century Spanish conquistador
- Juan Núñez de Prado (Grand Master of Calatrava) (died 1355), ortoguese nobleman and Master of the Order of Calatrava
- Julio Márquez de Prado Pérez (1948–2021), Spanish magistrate
- Marcos Ramírez de Prado y Ovando (1592–1667), Roman Catholic prelate who served as Archbishop of Mexico
- Martha Bolaños de Prado (1897–1963), Guatemalan actor, musician, composer and educator
- Catherine Lacoste de Prado, French amateur golfer and the only player who has won the U.S. Women's Open as an amateur
- Nélida Bollini de Prado, a member of the Puccio criminal family

== See also ==
- Prado (disambiguation)
