= 2023 in Absolute Championship Akhmat =

Mixed martial arts events

Information
- First date: January 27, 2023
- Last date: December 23, 2022

Events
- Total events: 18

Fights
- Total fights: 206
- Title fights: 9

The year 2023 was the 11th year in the history of the Absolute Championship Akhmat, a mixed martial arts promotion based in Russia. 2023 begin with ACA 151.

== Events list ==
#	Event	Date	Venue	Location
1	ACA 151: Abiltarov vs. Gomes	January 27, 2023	TatNeft Arena	Kazan, Russia
2	ACA 152: Bukuev vs. Gadzhiev	February 25, 2023	CSKA Arena	Moscow, Russia
3	ACA 153: Dzhanaev vs. Pessoa	March 9, 2023	CSKA Arena	Moscow, Russia
4	ACA 154: Vakhaev vs. Goncharov	March 17, 2023	Basket-Hall Krasnodar	Krasnodar, Russia
5	ACA 155: Karginov vs. Silva	April 9, 2023	Falcon Club Arena	Minsk, Belarus
6	ACA 156: Koshkin vs. Boyko	April 28, 2023	CSKA Arena	Moscow, Russia
7	ACA 157: Frolov vs. Abdulaev	May 19, 2023	TatNeft Arena	Kazan, Russia
8	ACA 158: Mokhnatkin vs. Olenichev	June 2, 2023	Sibur Arena	Saint Petersburg, Russia
9	ACA 159: Vartanyan vs. Reznikov	June 16, 2023	Bolshoy Ice Dome	Sochi, Russia
10	ACA 160: Slipenko vs. Gadzhidaudov	July 21, 2023	CSKA Arena	Moscow, Russia
11	ACA 161: Gasanov vs. Abdurakhmanov	August 11, 2023	Irina Viner-Usmanova Gymnastics Palace	Moscow, Russia
12	ACA 162: Tumenov vs. Palmer	September 2, 2023	Basket-Hall Krasnodar	Krasnodar, Russia
13	ACA 163: Mamashov vs. Kolodko	September 22, 2023	Falcon Club Arena	Minsk, Belarus
14	ACA 164: Abdulvakhabov vs. Kokov	October 4, 2023	Sports Hall Coliseum	Grozny, Russia
15	ACA 165: Dakaev vs. Batista	November 3, 2023	Sibur Arena	Saint Petersburg, Russia
16	ACA 166: Magomedov vs. Dolgov	November 24, 2023	Sibur Arena	Saint Petersburg, Russia
17	ACA 167: Baidulaev vs. Dias	December 8, 2023	Ufa Arena	Ufa, Russia
18	ACA 168: Gadzhidaudov vs. Tumenov	December 24, 2023	CSKA Arena	Moscow, Russia

== Title fights ==
Title fights in 2023
Weight class				Method	Round	Time	Event	Notes
Flyweight	Kurban Gadzhiev	def.	Imran Bukuev (c)	Decision (split)	5	5:00	ACA 152	(Note: For the ACA Flyweight Championship.)
Lightweight	Mukhamed Kokov	def.	Hacran Dias	Decision (unanimous)	5	5:00	ACA 154	(Note: For the interim ACA Lightweight Championship.)
Bantamweight	Oleg Borisov (c)	def.	Rustam Kerimov	Decision (split)	5	5:00	ACA 154	(Note: For the ACA Bantamweight Championship.)
Heavyweight	Evgeniy Goncharov	def.	Alikhan Vakhaev (c)	Decision (unanimous)	5	5:00	ACA 154	(Note: For the ACA Heavyweight Championship.)
Featherweight	Islam Omarov	def.	Alikhan Suleymanov (c)	TKO (punches)	2	3:06	ACA 160	(Note: For the ACA Featherweight Championship.)
Welterweight	Ustarmagomed Gadzhidaudov	def.	Vitaly Slipenko (c)	Decision (unanimous)	5	5:00	ACA 160	(Note: For the ACA Welterweight Championship.)
Middleweight	Magomedrasul Gasanov (c)	def.	Salamu Abdurakhmanov	Decision (unanimous)	5	5:00	ACA 161	(Note: For the ACA Middleweight Championship.)
Lightweight	Abdul-Aziz Abdulvakhabov (c)	def.	Mukhamed Kokov (ic)	TKO (punches)	2	1:55	ACA 164	(Note: For the unification of ACA Lightweight Championship.)
Welterweight	Albert Tumenov	def.	Ustarmagomed Gadzhidaudov (c)	KO (punches)	5	4:53	ACA 168	(Note: For the ACA Welterweight Championship.)

== 2023 Grands Prix ==
ACA President Mayrbek Khasiev recently revealed that the promotion will run Grand Prix across all their weight classes, with a total prize pool of $10 million.

=== 2022 ACA Lightweight Grand Prix ===
The prize fund of the Grand Prix in a lightweight division will be 800.000 dollars, this was announced by the founder of the ACA league Mairbek Khasiev, with the winner of the GP getting a cash prize of $200,000.

Quarter-finals
(Brazil) Hacran Dias	5r.
(Russia) Yusuf Raisov	UD
(Democratic Republic of the Congo) Alain Ilunga	3r.
(Russia) Eduard Vartanyan	SUB
(Russia) Ali Bagov	No*
(Russia) Rashid Magomedov	Contest
(Brazil) Davi Ramos	5r.
(Kazakhstan) Artem Reznikov	UD

Semi-finals
(Russia) Yusuf Raisov	2r.
(Russia) Eduard Vartanyan	TKO
(Russia) Andrey Koshkin	2r.
(Kazakhstan) Artem Reznikov	SUB

Final
(Russia) Eduard Vartanyan	TKO
(Kazakhstan) Artem Reznikov	3r.

Participants: Alain Ilunga, Ali Bagov, Yusuf Raisov, Hacran Dias, Artem Reznikov, Eduard Vartanyan, Davi Ramos

- Rashid Magomedov and Ali Bagov fought at ACA 141. However the bout ended in a no contest due to the president of ACA stopping the bout due to inactivity. Both were eliminated from the tournament.

=== 2023 ACA Heavyweight Grand Prix ===
Quarter-finals
(Russia) Alikhan Vakhaev (c)	5r.
(Russia) Evgeniy Goncharov	UD
(Russia) Anton Vyazigin	UD
(United States) Tony Johnson Jr.	5r.
(Russia) Mukhamad Vakhaev	TKO
(Russia) Grigoriy Ponomarev	1r.
(Russia) Salimgerey Rasulov	5r.
(Russia) Kirill Kornilov	UD

Semi-finals
(Russia) Evgeniy Goncharov (c)
(Russia) Anton Vyazigin
(Russia) Mukhamad Vakhaev
(Russia) Kirill Kornilov

Final
(Russia)
(Russia)

*Francimar Barroso was unable to fight the day of the bout and no replacement was found.

=== 2023 ACA Light Heavyweight Grand Prix ===
Quarter-finals
(Russia) Muslim Magomedov (c)	*
(Russia) Adlan Ibragimov
(Russia) Murat Gugov	1r.
(Brazil) Leonardo Silva	KO
(Russia) Mikhail Mokhnatkin	UD
(Russia) Oleg Olenichev	5r.
(Tajikistan) Faridun Odilov	SUB
(Brazil) Wagner Prado	2r.

Semi-finals
(Russia) Adlan Ibragimov
(Brazil) Leonardo Silva
(Russia) Mikhail Mokhnatkin	3r.
(Tajikistan) Faridun Odilov	TKO

Final
(Tajikistan) Faridun Odilov

*following a missed weigh-in (over 5kg), Muslim Magomedov was withdrawn from the grand prix and stripped of his title. Adlan Ibragimov automatically qualifies for the semi-finals.

=== 2023 ACA Middleweight Grand Prix ===
Quarter-finals
(Russia) Magomedrasul Gasanov (c)	UD
(Russia) Salamu Abdurakhmanov	5r.
(Russia) Mikhail Dolgov	5r.
(Russia) Ibragim Magomedov	UD
(Russia) Shamil Abdulaev	MD
(Russia) Artem Frolov	5r.
(Russia) Abdul-Rakhman Dzhanaev	TKO
(United States) Chris Honeycutt	1r.

Semi-finals
(Russia) Magomedrasul Gasanov (c)
(Russia) Ibragim Magomedov
(Russia) Shamil Abdulaev
(Russia) Abdul-Rakhman Dzhanaev

Final
(Russia)
(Russia)

=== 2023 ACA Welterweight Grand Prix ===
Quarter-finals
(Russia) Vitaly Slipenko (c)	5r.
(Russia) Ustarmagomed Gadzhidaudov	UD
(Russia) Albert Tumenov	UD
(Kyrgyzstan) Altynbek Mamashov	5r.
(Kyrgyzstan) Edil Esengulov	TKO
(Brazil) Vinicius Cruz	4r.
(Russia) Abubakar Vagaev	UD
(Brazil) Michel Prazeres	5r.

Semi-finals
(Russia) Ustarmagomed Gadzhidaudov (c)	5r.
(Russia) Albert Tumenov	KO
(Kyrgyzstan) Edil Esengulov
(Russia) Abubakar Vagaev

Final
(Russia) Albert Tumenov (c)

=== 2023 ACA Lightweight Grand Prix ===
Quarter-finals
(Russia) Abdul-Aziz Abdulvakhabov (c)	TKO
(Russia) Mukhamed Kokov (ic)	2r.
(Brazil) Davi Ramos
TBA
(Russia) Mehdi Dakaev	3r.
(Brazil) Herdeson Batista	TKO
(Russia) Ali Bagov	TKO
(Kazakhstan) Artem Reznikov	4r.

Semi-finals
(Russia) Abdul-Aziz Abdulvakhabov (c)
(Brazil) Herdeson Batista
(Russia) Ali Bagov

Final

=== 2023 ACA Featherweight Grand Prix ===
Quarter-finals
(Russia) Alikhan Suleymanov (c)	TKO
(Russia) Islam Omarov	2r.
(Russia) Alexey Polpudnikov	TKO
(Russia) Abdul-Rakhman Dudaev	5r.
(Russia) Bibert Tumenov	TKO
(United States) Lance Palmer	1r.
(Russia) Kurban Taygibov	KO
(Brazil) Luis Rafael Laurentino	1r.

Semi-finals
(Russia) Islam Omarov (c)
(Russia) Alexey Polpudnikov
(Russia) Bibert Tumenov
(Russia) Kurban Taygibov

Final
(Russia)
(Russia)

=== 2023 ACA Bantamweight Grand Prix ===
Quarter-finals
(Russia) Oleg Borisov (c)	SD
(Russia) Rustam Kerimov	5r.
(Russia) Magomed Bibulatov	UD
(Georgia (country)) Vazha Tsiptauri	5r.
(Russia) Makharbek Karginov	SD
(Brazil) Josiel Silva	5r.
(Russia) Mehdi Baidulaev	SUB
(Brazil) Gilberto Dias	1r.

Semi-finals
(Russia) Oleg Borisov (c)
(Russia) Magomed Bibulatov
(Russia) Makharbek Karginov
(Russia) Mehdi Baidulaev

Final
(Russia)
(Russia)

=== 2023 ACA Flyweight Grand Prix ===
Quarter-finals
(Russia) Imran Bukuev (c)	5r.
(Russia) Kurban Gadzhiev	SD
(Tajikistan) Azam Gaforov	SD
(Russia) Vartan Asatryan	5r.
(Russia) Rasul Albaskhanov	UD
(Kyrgyzstan) Ryskulbek Ibraimov	5r.
(Russia) Azamat Kerefov	TKO
(Tajikistan) Osimkhon Rakhmonov	3r.

Semi-finals
(Russia) Kurban Gadzhiev (c)
(Tajikistan) Azam Gaforov
(Russia) Rasul Albaskhanov
(Russia) Azamat Kerefov

Final
(Russia)

== ACA 151: Abiltarov vs Gomes ==
ACA 151: Abiltarov vs Gomes
- Promotion: Absolute Championship Akhmat
- Date: January 27, 2023
- Venue: TatNeft Arena
- City: Kazan, Tatarstan, Russia

Absolute Championship Akhmat 151: Abiltarov vs Gomes was a mixed martial arts event held by Absolute Championship Akhmat on January 27, 2023 in Kazan, Tatarstan, Russia.

=== Background ===
The event will be the first of the year for ACA and will be headlined by a flyweight bout between Ruslan Abiltarov and Alan Gomes.

Bonus awards:

The following fighters were awarded bonuses:

- $50,000 Performance of the Night: Alan Gomes
- $25,000 Performance of the Night: Ruslan Abiltarov
- $5000 Stoppage Victory Bonuses: Ibragim Magomedov | Osimkhon Rakhmonov | Faridun Odilov and Aleksandr Podlesniy

=== Results ===
ACA 151
Weight Class				Method	Round	Time	Notes
Flyweight 57 kg	(Brazil) Alan Gomes	def.	(Ukraine) Ruslan Abiltarov	Decision (Split)	5	5:00	
Lightweight 70 kg	(Russia) Yusuf Raisov	def.	(Democratic Republic of the Congo) Alain Ilunga	Submission (Guillotine Choke)	2	1:12	Raisov missed weight (158 lbs)
Middleweight 84 kg	(Russia) Ibragim Magomedov	def.	(Brazil) Cleber Sousa	KO (Knee to the Body)	3	1:33	
Flyweight 57 kg	(Tajikistan) Osimkhon Rakhmonov	def.	(Kyrgyzstan) Zhakshylyk Konurbaev	Submission (Arm-Triangle Choke)	1	2:50	
Bantamweight 62 kg	(Kyrgyzstan) Alimardan Abdykaarov	def.	(Brazil) Francisco Maciel	Decision (Unanimous)	3	5:00	
Preliminary Card
Bantamweight 61 kg	(Russia) Akhmed Musakaev	def.	(Kazakhstan) Igor Zhirkov	Decision (Unanimous)	3	5:00	
Light Heavyweight 93 kg	(Tajikistan) Faridun Odilov	def.	(Iran) Amin Nouri	Submission (Guillotine Choke)	1	1:40	
Bantamweight 61 kg	(Ukraine) Aleksandr Podlesniy	def.	(Russia) Kiril Fomenkov	TKO (Elbows and Punches)	3	2:02	

== ACA 152: Bukuev vs Gadzhiev ==
ACA 152: Bukuev vs Gadzhiev
- Promotion: Absolute Championship Akhmat
- Date: February 25, 2023
- Venue: CSKA Arena
- City: Moscow, Russia

Absolute Championship Akhmat 152: Bukuev vs Gadzhiev was a mixed martial arts event held by Absolute Championship Akhmat on February 25, 2023 at the CSKA Arena in Moscow, Russia.

=== Background ===
Bonus awards:

The following fighters were awarded bonuses:

- $50,000 Performance of the Night: Kurban Gadzhiev
- $25,000 Performance of the Night: Imran Bukuev
- $5000 Stoppage Victory Bonuses: Tomáš Deák, Mehdi Baidulaev and Murad Kalamov

=== Results ===
ACA 152
Weight Class				Method	Round	Time	Notes
Flyweight 57 kg	(Russia) Kurban Gadzhiev	def.	(Russia) Imran Bukuev (c)	Decision (Split)	5	5:00	2023 ACA Flyweight Grand Prix Quarter-Final bout for the ACA Flyweight Championship
Flyweight 57 kg	(Russia) Rasul Albaskhanov	def.	(Kyrgyzstan) Ryskulbek Ibraimov	Decision (Unanimous)	5	5:00	2023 ACA Flyweight Grand Prix Quarter-Final bout. Ibraimov missed weight (127 lbs)
Bantamweight 61 kg	(Slovakia) Tomáš Deák	def.	(Russia) Nashkho Galaev	Technical Submission (Rear-Naked Choke)	2	1:42	Galaev missed weight (138.1 lbs)
Catchweight 63.5 kg	(Russia) Mehdi Baidulaev	def.	(Brazil) Inaildo Santos	Submission (Kimura)	2	2:54	
Light Heavyweight 93 kg	(Russia) Adlan Ibragimov	def.	(Russia) Evgeny Erokhin	Decision (Unanimous)	3	5:00	
Preliminary Card
Catchweight 59 kg	(Russia) Yunus Evloev	def.	(Brazil) José Alexandre	Decision (Unanimous)	3	5:00	
Catchweight 64 kg	(Russia) Murad Kalamov	def.	(Uzbekistan) Bakhodir Tillabaev	Submission (Modified Kimura)	1	4:26	
Featherweight 66 kg	(Brazil) Cleverson Silva	def.	(Russia) Akhmed Balkizov	Decision (Split)	3	5:00	
Light Heavyweight 93 kg	(Russia) Artur Astakhov	def.	(Brazil) Ednaldo Oliveira	Decision (Unanimous)	3	5:00	
Catchweight 63 kg	(Russia) Dzhambulat Zelimkhanov	def.	(Brazil) Irmeson Oliveira	Decision (Unanimous)	3	5:00	
Bantamweight 61 kg	(Russia) Dzhaddal Alibekov	def.	(Uzbekistan) Dildorbek Nurmatov	Decision (Unanimous)	3	5:00	
Lightweight 70 kg	(Russia) Abubakar Mestoev	def.	(Russia) Vladimir Palchenkov	Decision (Unanimous)	3	5:00	

== ACA 153: Dzhanaev vs. Pessoa ==
ACA 153: Dzhanaev vs. Pessoa
- Promotion: Absolute Championship Akhmat
- Date: March 9, 2023
- Venue: CSKA Arena
- City: Moscow, Russia

Absolute Championship Akhmat 153: Dzhanaev vs. Pessoa was a mixed martial arts event held by Absolute Championship Akhmat on March 9, 2023 at the CSKA Arena in Moscow, Russia.

=== Background ===
Bonus awards:

The following fighters were awarded bonuses:

- $50,000 Performance of the Night: Daniyar Toychubek
- $25,000 Performance of the Night: Akhmed Khamzaev
- $5000 Stoppage Victory Bonuses: Faridun Odilov | Elkhan Musaev | Abdul-Rakhman Temirov | Alberd Zhapuev and Anis Ekubov

=== Results ===
ACA 153
Weight Class				Method	Round	Time	Notes
Featherweight 66 kg	(Russia) Islam Omarov	def.	(Brazil) Luis Rafael Laurentino	Submission (Rear-Naked Choke)	2	4:27	Omarov missed weight (147.8 lbs)
Featherweight 66 kg	(Brazil) Carlos Augusto da Silva	def.	(Tajikistan) Davlatmand Chuponov	Decision (Split)	3	5:00	da Silva missed weight (146.6 lbs)
Middleweight 84 kg	(United States) Chris Honeycutt	def.	(Russia) Vasily Kurochkin	Decision (Unanimous)	3	5:00	
Light Heavyweight 93 kg	(Tajikistan) Faridun Odilov	def.	(Brazil) Natalicio Filho	TKO (Punches)	1	1:58	
Preliminary Card
Bantamweight 61 kg	(Russia) Pavel Vitruk	def.	(Russia) Selem Evloev	Decision (Unanimous)	3	5:00	
Light Heavyweight 93 kg	(Russia) Elkhan Musaev	def.	(Tajikistan) Abdul-Khamid Davlatov	Submission (Kimura)	2	3:22	
Lightweight 70 kg	(Russia) Abdul-Rakhman Temirov	def.	(Kyrgyzstan) Sanzhar Azhibaev	Submission (Rear-Naked Choke)	2	1:14	Azhibaev missed weight (157.8 lbs)
Featherweight 66 kg	(Russia) Alberd Zhapuev	def.	(Uzbekistan) Zukhriddin Gafurov	Submission (Rear-Naked Choke)	1	3:51	
Featherweight 66 kg	(Brazil) John Macapá	def.	(Russia) Akhmadkhan Bokov	Decision (Unanimous)	3	5:00	Macapá missed weight (149.9 lbs)
Flyweight 57 kg	(Kyrgyzstan) Daniyar Toychubek	def.	(Russia) Akhmed Khamzaev	Decision (Unanimous)	3	5:00	
Flyweight 57 kg	(Tajikistan) Anis Ekubov	def.	(Kyrgyzstan) Asan Saparbay	Submission (Rear-Naked Choke)	1	2:21	

== ACA 154: Vakhaev vs Goncharov ==
ACA 154: Vakhaev vs Goncharov
- Promotion: Absolute Championship Akhmat
- Date: March 17, 2023
- Venue: Basket-Hall Krasnodar
- City: Krasnodar, Russia

Absolute Championship Akhmat 154: Vakhaev vs Goncharov was a mixed martial arts event held by Absolute Championship Akhmat on March 17, 2023 at the Basket-Hall Krasnodar in Krasnodar, Russia.

=== Background ===
Bonus awards:

The following fighters were awarded bonuses:

- $50,000 Performance of the Night: Leonardo Silva
- $25,000 Performance of the Night:
- $5000 Stoppage Victory Bonuses: Khalid Satuev and Astemir Nagoev

=== Results ===
ACA 154
Weight Class				Method	Round	Time	Notes
Heavyweight 120 kg	(Russia) Evgeniy Goncharov	def.	(Russia) Alikhan Vakhaev (c)	Decision (Unanimous)	5	5:00	2023 ACA Heavyweight Grand Prix Quarter-Final bout for the ACA Heavyweight Championship
Bantamweight 61 kg	(Russia) Oleg Borisov (c)	def.	(Russia) Rustam Kerimov	Decision (Split)	5	5:00	2023 ACA Bantamweight Grand Prix Quarter-Final bout for the ACA Bantamweight Championship
Lightweight 71 kg	(Russia) Mukhamed Kokov	def.	(Brazil) Hacran Dias	Decision (Unanimous)	5	5:00	For the Interim ACA Lightweight Championship
Welterweight 77 kg	(Russia) Albert Tumenov	def.	(Kyrgyzstan) Altynbek Mamashov	Decision (Unanimous)	5	5:00	2023 ACA Welterweight Grand Prix Quarter-Final bout
Featherweight 66 kg	(Russia) Alexey Polpudnikov	def.	(Russia) Abdul-Rakhman Dudaev	TKO (Punches to the Body)	5	4:25	2023 ACA Featherweight Grand Prix Quarter-Final bout. Polpudnikov missed weight (146.9 lbs)
Preliminary Card
Heavyweight 120 kg	(Russia) Kirill Kornilov	def.	(Russia) Salimgerey Rasulov	Decision (Unanimous)	5	5:00	2023 ACA Heavyweight Grand Prix Quarter-Final bout
Light Heavyweight 93 kg	(Brazil) Leonardo Silva	def.	(Russia) Murat Gugov	KO (Punch)	1	1:31	2023 ACA Light Heavyweight Grand Prix Quarter-Final bout
Lightweight 71 kg	(Russia) Daud Shaikhaev	def.	(Russia) Ali Bagov	Decision (Split)	3	5:00	Bagov missed weight (159.3 lbs)
Welterweight 77 kg	(Russia) Ustarmagomed Gadzhidaudov	def.	(Russia) Lom-Ali Nalgiev	Decision (Unanimous)	3	5:00	
Lightweight 71 kg	(Russia) Khalid Satuev	def.	(Russia) Bayzet Khatkhokhu	TKO (Knee to the Body and Punches)	1	4:20	
Welterweight 77 kg	(Russia) Yakub Sulimanov	def.	(Brazil) Renato Gomes	Decision (Split)	3	5:00	
Flyweight 57 kg	(Russia) Astemir Nagoev	def.	(Kyrgyzstan) Chyngyz Mansurov	TKO (Punches)	3	0:53	Mansurov missed weight (126.9 lbs)

== ACA 155: Karginov vs. Silva ==
ACA 155: Karginov vs. Silva
- Promotion: Absolute Championship Akhmat
- Date: April 9, 2023
- Venue: Falcon Club Arena
- City: Minsk, Belarus

Absolute Championship Akhmat 155: Karginov vs. Silva was a mixed martial arts event held by Absolute Championship Akhmat on April 9, 2023 at the Falcon Club Arena in Minsk, Belarus.

=== Background ===
Bonus awards:

The following fighters were awarded bonuses:

- $50,000 Performance of the Night:
- $25,000 Performance of the Night:
- $5000 Stoppage Victory Bonuses:

=== Results ===
ACA 155
Weight Class				Method	Round	Time	Notes
Bantamweight 61 kg	(Russia) Makharbek Karginov	def.	(Brazil) Josiel Silva	Decision (Split)	5	5:00	2023 ACA Bantamweight Grand Prix Quarter-Final bout
Middleweight 84 kg	(Russia) Mikhail Dolgov	def.	(Bulgaria) Nikola Dipchikov	Submission (Rear-Naked Choke)	1	2:55	
Lightweight 71 kg	(Kyrgyzstan) Zhakshylyk Myrzabekov	def.	(Belarus) Artiom Damkovsky	Decision (Unanimous)	3	5:00	
Lightweight 71 kg	(Brazil) Davi Ramos	def.	(Romania) Aurel Pîrtea	TKO (Punches and Knee)	1	4:59	
Preliminary Card
Welterweight 77 kg	(Belarus) Ruslan Kolodko	def.	(Italy) Cristian Brinzan	Decision (Unanimous)	3	5:00	
Lightweight 71 kg	(Belarus) Vladislav Mishkevich	def.	(Czech Republic) Vítězslav Rajnoch	TKO (Punches)	2	4:57	Rajnoch missed weight (159.2 lbs)
Lightweight 71 kg	(Belarus) Viktor Makarenko	def.	(Kyrgyzstan) Bekbolot Abdylda	Decision (Split)	3	5:00	
Welterweight 77 kg	(Belarus) Denis Maher	def.	(Serbia) Jovan Zdelar	TKO (Elbows)	1	2:26	
Light Heavyweight 93 kg	(Russia) Stepan Gorshechnikov	def.	(Croatia) Goran Reljić	TKO (Punches)	1	1:56	
Featherweight 66 kg	(Iran) Shahram Haghi	def.	(Russia) Valery Gritsutin	Submission (Guillotine Choke)	1	4:02	
Flyweight 57 kg	(Brazil) Alexsandro Praia	def.	(Uzbekistan) Dildorbek Nurmatov	Decision (Unanimous)	3	5:00	

== ACA 156: Koshkin vs Boyko ==
ACA 156: Koshkin vs Boyko
- Promotion: Absolute Championship Akhmat
- Date: April 28, 2023
- Venue: CSKA Arena
- City: Moscow, Russia

Absolute Championship Akhmat 156: Koshkin vs Boyko was a mixed martial arts event held by Absolute Championship Akhmat on April 28, 2023 at the CSKA Arena in Moscow, Russia.

=== Background ===
Bonus awards:

The following fighters were awarded bonuses:

- $50,000 Performance of the Night: Vener Galiev
- $25,000 Performance of the Night:
- $5000 Stoppage Victory Bonuses: Andrey Goncharov, Wagner Prado and Ayk Gasparyan

=== Results ===
ACA 156
Weight Class				Method	Round	Time	Notes
Welterweight 77 kg	(Russia) Anatoliy Boyko	def.	(Russia) Andrey Koshkin	Decision (Split)	3	5:00	Boyko missed weight (171.7 lbs)
Lightweight 71 kg	(Russia) Andrey Goncharov	def.	(Brazil) Felipe Froes	KO (Punches)	1	3:09	Froes missed weight (156.5 lbs)
Lightweight 71 kg	(Russia) Vener Galiev	def.	(Georgia (country)) Levan Makashvili	TKO (Punches)	1	1:39	
Heavyweight 120 kg	(Brazil) Carlos Felipe	def.	(Russia) Yuriy Fedorov	Decision (Split)	3	5:00	
Bantamweight 66 kg	(Ukraine) Aleksandr Podlesniy	def.	(Georgia (country)) Vazha Tsiptauri	Decision (Split)	3	5:00	
Preliminary Card
Heavyweight 120 kg	(Russia) Roman Lukashevich	def.	(Russia) Artur Smirnov	TKO (Punches)	1	3:15	
Light Heavyweight 93 kg	(Brazil) Wagner Prado	def.	(Russia) Elmar Gasanov	KO (Punch)	2	1:02	
Flyweight 57 kg	(Armenia) Mkhitar Barseghyan	def.	(Georgia (country)) Bidzina Gavasheshvili	Decision (Split)	3	5:00	
Bantamweight 66 kg	(Armenia) Ayk Gasparyan	def.	(Russia) Aleksandr Dontsov	Submission (Rear-Naked Choke)	2	1:13	
Flyweight 57 kg	(Afghanistan) Abdul Karim Badakhshi	def.	(Uzbekistan) Kholmurod Nurmatov	Decision (Split)	3	5:00	
Lightweight 71 kg	(Brazil) Herbert Batista	def.	(Russia) Vladimir Palchenkov	Decision (Unanimous)	3	5:00	
Flyweight 57 kg	(Armenia) German Barsegyan	def.	(Russia) Muso Vistokadamov	Decision (Unanimous)	3	5:00	Barsegyan (129 lbs) and Vistokadamov (125.5 lbs) missed weight.

== ACA 157: Frolov vs. Abdulaev ==
ACA 157: Frolov vs. Abdulaev
- Promotion: Absolute Championship Akhmat
- Date: May 19, 2023
- Venue: TatNeft Arena
- City: Kazan, Russia

Absolute Championship Akhmat 157: Frolov vs. Abdulaev was a mixed martial arts event held by Absolute Championship Akhmat on May 19, 2023 at the TatNeft Arena in Kazan, Russia.

=== Background ===
Bonus awards:

The following fighters were awarded bonuses:

- $50,000 Performance of the Night: Shamil Abdulaev
- $25,000 Performance of the Night: Artem Frolov
- $5000 Stoppage Victory Bonuses: Mukhitdin Kholov | Denis Smoldarev | Sergey Kalinin | Osimkhon Rakhmonov | Marcos Rodrigues | Renat Ondar and Tamerlan Kulaev

=== Results ===
ACA 157
Weight Class				Method	Round	Time	Notes
Middleweight 84 kg	(Russia) Shamil Abdulaev	def.	(Russia) Artem Frolov	Decision (Majority)	5	5:00	2023 ACA Middleweight Grand Prix Quarter-Final bout
Bantamweight 61 kg	(Kyrgyzstan) Alimardan Abdykaarov	def.	(Brazil) Daniel Oliveira	Decision (Unanimous)	3	5:00	
Light Heavyweight 93 kg	(Russia) Evgeny Erokhin	def.	(Russia) Artur Astakhov	Decision (Unanimous)	3	5:00	
Bantamweight 61 kg	(Tajikistan) Mukhitdin Kholov	def.	(Kazakhstan) Igor Zhirkov	Technical Submission (Guillotine Choke)	1	1:57	
Preliminary Card
Heavyweight 120 kg	(Estonia) Denis Smoldarev	def.	(Democratic Republic of the Congo) Matunga Djikasa	KO (Punch)	1	1:30	
Middleweight 84 kg	(Russia) Sergey Kalinin	def.	(Belarus) Vladislav Yankovsky	Submission (Triangle Choke)	1	2:05	
Flyweight 57 kg	(Tajikistan) Osimkhon Rakhmonov	def.	(Brazil) José Alexandre	KO (Punches)	2	2:30	
Lightweight 70 kg	(Uzbekistan) Otabek Toxirov	def.	(Russia) Sergey Yakovlev	TKO (Doctor Stoppage)	2	5:00	
Featherweight 66 kg	(Brazil) Marcos Rodrigues	def.	(Kyrgyzstan) Nizambek Abdrashitov	TKO (Flying Knee and Punches)	1	0:40	
Bantamweight 61 kg	(Russia) Renat Ondar	def.	(Brazil) Rodrigo Praia	KO (Punch)	1	2:19	
Bantamweight 61 kg	(Russia) Tamerlan Kulaev	def.	(Tajikistan) Umidjon Musaev	TKO (Punches)	2	2:44	

== ACA 158: Mokhnatkin vs Olenichev ==
ACA 158: Mokhnatkin vs Olenichev
- Promotion: Absolute Championship Akhmat
- Date: June 2, 2023
- Venue: Sibur Arena
- City: Saint Petersburg, Russia

Absolute Championship Akhmat 158: Mokhnatkin vs Olenichev was a mixed martial arts event held by Absolute Championship Akhmat on June 2, 2023 at the Sibur Arena in Saint Petersburg, Russia.

=== Background ===
Bonus awards:

The following fighters were awarded bonuses:

- $50,000 Performance of the Night: Gadzhimurad Khiramagomedov
- $25,000 Performance of the Night:
- $5000 Stoppage Victory Bonuses: Shergazy Kenjebekov and Artem Semenov

=== Results ===
ACA 158
Weight Class				Method	Round	Time	Notes
Light Heavyweight 93 kg	(Russia) Mikhail Mokhnatkin	def.	(Russia) Oleg Olenichev	Decision (Unanimous)	5	5:00	2023 ACA Light Heavyweight Grand Prix Quarter-Final bout
Heavyweight 120 kg	(Russia) Anton Vyazigin	def.	(United States) Tony Johnson Jr.	Decision (Unanimous)	5	5:00	2023 ACA Heavyweight Grand Prix Quarter-Final bout
Middleweight 84 kg	(Russia) Gadzhimurad Khiramagomedov	def.	(Russia) Stanislav Vlasenko	KO (Punch)	2	2:01	
Flyweight 57 kg	(Russia) Aren Akopyan	def.	(Kyrgyzstan) Ryskulbek Ibraimov	Decision (Unanimous)	3	5:00	Ibraimov missed weight (126.3 lbs)
Middleweight 84 kg	(Russia) Ivan Bogdanov	def.	(Brazil) Cleber Souza	Decision (Unanimous)	3	5:00	
Preliminary Card
Bantamweight 61 kg	(Russia) Murad Kalamov	def.	(Brazil) Charles Henrique	Decision (Unanimous)	3	5:00	
Bantamweight 61 kg	(Russia) Igor Olchonov	def.	(Russia) Nikita Chistyakov	Decision (Unanimous)	3	5:00	Olchonov missed weight (137.7 lbs)
Flyweight 57 kg	(Russia) Mansur Khatuev	def.	(Kyrgyzstan) Kairat Nurbay	Decision (Unanimous)	3	5:00	Nurbay missed weight (127.5 lbs)
Featherweight 66 kg	(Kyrgyzstan) Shergazy Kenjebekov	def.	(Russia) Nikita Prikhodko	TKO (Punches)	1	1:14	
Featherweight 66 kg	(Russia) Artem Semenov	def.	(Uzbekistan) Zukhriddin Gafurov	TKO (Punches and Elbows)	2	1:07	
Flyweight 57 kg	(Tajikistan) Oyatullo Muminov	def.	(Belarus) Andrei Kalechits	Decision (Unanimous)	3	5:00	

== ACA 159: Vartanyan vs Reznikov ==
ACA 159: Vartanyan vs Reznikov
- Promotion: Absolute Championship Akhmat
- Date: June 16, 2023
- Venue: Bolshoy Ice Dome
- City: Sochi, Russia

Absolute Championship Akhmat 159: Vartanyan vs Reznikov was a mixed martial arts event held by Absolute Championship Akhmat on June 16, 2023 at the Bolshoy Ice Dome in Sochi, Russia.

=== Background ===
Bonus awards:

The following fighters were awarded bonuses:

- $50,000 Performance of the Night: Eduard Vartanyan
- $25,000 Performance of the Night:
- $5000 Stoppage Victory Bonuses: Grigor Matevosyan | Alexander Matmuratov | Azamat Pshukov | Mehdi Dakaev | Vinicius Cruz | Elias Silvério and Yusup-Khadzhi Zubariev

=== Results ===
ACA 159
Weight Class				Method	Round	Time	Notes
Lightweight 70 kg	(Russia) Eduard Vartanyan	def.	(Kazakhstan) Artem Reznikov	TKO (Punches)	3	3:42	2022 ACA Lightweight Grand Prix Final
Light Heavyweight 93 kg	(Russia) Grigor Matevosyan	def.	(Russia) Stepan Gorshechnikov	TKO (Punches)	2	1:36	
Lightweight 70 kg	(Russia) Alexander Matmuratov	def.	(Ecuador) Javier Basurto	TKO (Spinning Wheel Kick and Punches)	1	1:30	
Flyweight 57 kg	(Russia) Azamat Pshukov	def.	(Brazil) Alexsandro Praia	TKO (Punches)	1	3:31	Praia missed weight (127.6 lbs)
Preliminary Card
Lightweight 70 kg	(Russia) Mehdi Dakaev	def.	(Brazil) Evertom Freitas	TKO (Body Kick and Punches)	1	3:52	
Lightweight 70 kg	(Russia) Adlan Bataev	def.	(Kyrgyzstan) Jakshylyk Myrzabekov	Decision (Split)	3	5:00	
Lightweight 70 kg	(Russia) Yusup Umarov	def.	(Democratic Republic of the Congo) Alain Ilunga	Decision (Unanimous)	3	5:00	
Welterweight 77 kg	(Brazil) Vinicius Cruz	def.	(Russia) Ayndi Umakhanov	TKO (Knees and Punches)	2	2:46	
Welterweight 77 kg	(Brazil) Elias Silvério	def.	(Russia) Mikhail Doroshenko	Submission (Rear-Naked Choke)	1	3:36	
Featherweight 66 kg	(Russia) Basir Saraliev	def.	(Russia) Akhmed Balkizov	Decision (Unanimous)	3	5:00	
Featherweight 66 kg	(Kyrgyzstan) Tynchtykbek Kanybek	def.	(Belarus) Alexander Kovalev	Decision (Unanimous)	3	5:00	Kanybek missed weight (150.9 lbs)
Lightweight 70 kg	(Russia) Amir Elzhurkaev	def.	(Brazil) Guilherme Doin	Decision (Unanimous)	3	5:00	
Bantamweight 61 kg	(Russia) Yusup-Khadzhi Zubariev	def.	(Russia) Rasul Malsugenov	TKO (Flying Knee and Punches)	1	4:05	

== ACA 160: Slipenko vs. Gadzhidaudov ==
ACA 160: Slipenko vs. Gadzhidaudov
- Promotion: Absolute Championship Akhmat
- Date: July 21, 2023
- Venue: CSKA Arena
- City: Moscow, Russia

Absolute Championship Akhmat 160: Slipenko vs. Gadzhidaudov was a mixed martial arts event held by Absolute Championship Akhmat on July 21, 2023 at the CSKA Arena in Moscow, Russia.

=== Background ===
Bonus awards:

The following fighters were awarded bonuses:

- $50,000 Performance of the Night: Ustarmagomed Gadzhidaudov
- $25,000 Performance of the Night: Vitaly Slipenko
- $5000 Stoppage Victory Bonuses: Islam Omarov | Kurban Taygibov | Herdeson Batista | Ibragim Magomedov | Nashkho Galaev | Viskhan Magomadov and Saifulla Dzhabrailov

=== Results ===
ACA 160
Weight Class				Method	Round	Time	Notes
Welterweight 77 kg	(Russia) Ustarmagomed Gadzhidaudov	def.	(Russia) Vitaly Slipenko (c)	Decision (Unanimous)	5	5:00	2023 ACA Welterweight Grand Prix Quarter-Final bout for the ACA Welterweight Championship
Featherweight 66 kg	(Russia) Islam Omarov	def.	(Russia) Alikhan Suleymanov (c)	TKO (Punches)	2	3:06	2023 ACA Featherweight Grand Prix Quarter-Final bout for the ACA Featherweight Championship
Featherweight 66 kg	(Russia) Kurban Taygibov	def.	(Brazil) Luis Rafael Laurentino	KO (Punches)	1	3:19	2023 ACA Featherweight Grand Prix Quarter-Final bout
Bantamweight 61 kg	(Russia) Abdul-Rakhman Dudaev	def.	(Brazil) Francisco Maciel	Decision (Unanimous)	3	5:00	Dudaev missed weight (140.8 lbs)
Bantamweight 61 kg	(Russia) Pavel Vitruk	def.	(Brazil) Maycon Silvan	Decision (Unanimous)	3	5:00	
Preliminary Card
Lightweight 70 kg	(Brazil) Herdeson Batista	def.	(Russia) Ramazan Kishev	KO (Knee)	1	2:36	
Middleweight 84 kg	(Russia) Ibragim Magomedov	def.	(Russia) Khusein Kushagov	KO (Knee)	1	3:49	
Bantamweight 61 kg	(Russia) Nashkho Galaev	def.	(Kyrgyzstan) Metan Dykanov	KO (Punch to the Body)	1	3:02	
Welterweight 77 kg	(Russia) Viskhan Magomadov	def.	(Brazil) Michel Silva	TKO (Punches)	1	1:58	
Lightweight 70 kg	(Russia) Amirkhan Adaev	def.	(Brazil) Herbert Batista	Decision (Split)	3	5:00	
Featherweight 66 kg	(Russia) Sayfullah Dzhabrailov	def.	(Brazil) Cleverson Silva	TKO (Body Kick and Punches)	1	1:02	
Bantamweight 61 kg	(Russia) Albert Misikov	def.	(Russia) Akhmadkhan Elmurzaev	Decision (Split)	3	5:00	Misikov missed weight (138.1 lbs)

== ACA 161: Gasanov vs Abdurakhmanov ==
ACA 161: Gasanov vs Abdurakhmanov
- Promotion: Absolute Championship Akhmat
- Date: August 11, 2023
- Venue: Irina Viner-Usmanova Gymnastics Palace
- City: Moscow, Russia

Absolute Championship Akhmat 161: Gasanov vs Abdurakhmanov was a mixed martial arts event held by Absolute Championship Akhmat on August 11, 2023 at the Irina Viner-Usmanova Gymnastics Palace in Moscow, Russia.

=== Background ===
An ACA Middleweight Championship bout between current champion Magomedrasul Gasanov and former champion Salamu Abdurakhmanov was booked as the event headliner.

A quarter-final bout for the 2023 ACA Heavyweight Grand Prix between former champion Mukhamad Vakhaev and former AMC Fight Nights Heavyweight champion Grigoriy Ponomarev served as the co-main event.

A quarter-final bout for the 2023 ACA Flyweight Grand Prix between former title challenger Azam Gaforov and former AMC Fight Nights Flyweight champion Vartan Asatryan took place at the event.

A quarter-final bout for the 2023 ACA Featherweight Grand Prix between Bibert Tumenov and former two-time PFL Featherweight champion Lance Palmer was expected to take place at the event. However, Palmer withdrew from the fight due to injury and the bout was postponed for the following event.

Bonus awards:

The following fighters were awarded bonuses:

- $50,000 Performance of the Night: Azam Gaforov
- $25,000 Performance of the Night: Vartan Asatryan
- $5000 Stoppage Victory Bonuses: Mukhamad Vakhaev | Faridun Odilov | Abdul-Rakhman Dzhanaev | Anis Ekubov | Dzhambulat Zelimkhanov | Sulim Batalov and Azamat Dzhigkaev

=== Results ===
ACA 161
Weight Class				Method	Round	Time	Notes
Middleweight 84 kg	(Russia) Magomedrasul Gasanov (c)	def.	(Russia) Salamu Abdurakhmanov	Decision (Unanimous)	5	5:00	2023 ACA Middleweight Grand Prix Quarter-Final bout for the ACA Middleweight Championship
Heavyweight 120 kg	(Russia) Mukhamad Vakhaev	def.	(Russia) Grigoriy Ponomarev	TKO (Leg Injury)	1	0:35	2023 ACA Heavyweight Grand Prix Quarter-Final bout
Flyweight 57 kg	(Tajikistan) Azam Gaforov	def.	(Russia) Vartan Asatryan	Decision (Split)	5	5:00	2023 ACA Flyweight Grand Prix Quarter-Final bout
Bantamweight 61 kg	(Russia) Magomed Bibulatov	def.	(Georgia (country)) Vazha Tsiptauri	Decision (Unanimous)	5	5:00	2023 ACA Bantamweight Grand Prix Quarter-Final bout
Light Heavyweight 93 kg	(Tajikistan) Faridun Odilov	def.	(Brazil) Wagner Prado	Submission (Scarf Hold)	2	2:46	2023 ACA Light Heavyweight Grand Prix Quarter-Final bout
Preliminary Card
Middleweight 84 kg	(Russia) Abdul-Rakhman Dzhanaev	def.	(United States) Chris Honeycutt	TKO (Punches)	1	2:04	2023 ACA Middleweight Grand Prix Quarter-Final bout
Flyweight 57 kg	(Russia) Imran Bukuev	def.	(Ukraine) Ruslan Abiltarov	Decision (Unanimous)	3	5:00	
Bantamweight 61 kg	(Russia) Rustam Kerimov	def.	(Brazil) Josiel Silva	Decision (Unanimous)	3	5:00	
Featherweight 66 kg	(Russia) Gleb Khabibulin	def.	(Tajikistan) Davlatmand Chuponov	Decision (Unanimous)	3	5:00	Chuponov missed weight (137.4 lbs)
Flyweight 57 kg	(Russia) Yunus Evloev	def.	(Brazil) Ruan Miqueias	Decision (Unanimous)	3	5:00	Evloev (128.3 lbs) and Miqueias (127.8 lbs) missed weight
Welterweight 77 kg	(Russia) Chersi Dudaev	def.	(Brazil) Lincoln Henrique	Decision (Unanimous)	3	5:00	
Flyweight 57 kg	(Tajikistan) Anis Ekubov	def.	(Kyrgyzstan) Rustambek Asylbek	KO (Flying Knee and Punches)	1	0:34	
Catchweight 64 kg	(Russia) Dzhambulat Zelimkhanov	def.	(Uzbekistan) Bakhodir Tillabaev	Submission (Anaconda Choke)	1	1:29	
Flyweight 57 kg	(Kyrgyzstan) Daniyar Toychubek	def.	(Armenia) Mkhitar Barseghyan	Decision (Unanimous)	3	5:00	
Light Heavyweight 93 kg	(Russia) Sulim Batalov	def.	(Tajikistan) Abdul-Khamid Davlatov	TKO (Punches)	1	0:57	
Welterweight 77 kg	(Russia) Azamat Dzhigkaev	def.	(Tajikistan) Solekh Khasanov	Submission (Rear-Naked Choke)	2	1:44	

== ACA 162: Tumenov vs. Palmer ==
ACA 162: Tumenov vs. Palmer
- Promotion: Absolute Championship Akhmat
- Date: September 2, 2023
- Venue: Basket-Hall Krasnodar
- City: Krasnodar, Russia

Absolute Championship Akhmat 162: Tumenov vs. Palmer was a mixed martial arts event held by Absolute Championship Akhmat on September 2, 2023 at the Basket-Hall Krasnodar in Krasnodar, Russia.

=== Background ===
An ACA Lightweight Championship unification bout between current champion Abdul-Aziz Abdulvakhabov and interim champion Mukhamed Kokov was scheduled to headline the event. However, for health reasons the bout was postponed on October 4.

A quarter-final bout for the 2023 ACA Featherweight Grand Prix between Bibert Tumenov and former two-time PFL Featherweight champion Lance Palmer headlined the event.

A quarter-final bout for the 2023 ACA Flyweight Grand Prix between former champion Azamat Kerefov and #9 ranked Osimkhon Rakhmonov took place at the event.

Bonus awards:

The following fighters were awarded bonuses:

- $50,000 Performance of the Night: Bibert Tumenov
- $5000 Stoppage Victory Bonuses: Artem Frolov and Anderson Gonçalves

=== Results ===
ACA 162
Weight Class				Method	Round	Time	Notes
Featherweight 66 kg	(Russia) Bibert Tumenov	def.	(United States) Lance Palmer	KO (Punches)	1	4:53	2023 ACA Featherweight Grand Prix Quarter-Final bout. Palmer (148 lbs / 67.1 kg) missed weight.
Welterweight 77 kg	(Russia) Abubakar Vagaev	def.	(Brazil) Michel Prazeres	Decision (Unanimous)	5	5:00	2023 ACA Welterweight Grand Prix Quarter-Final bout
Flyweight 57 kg	(Russia) Azamat Kerefov	def.	(Tajikistan) Osimkhon Rakhmonov	TKO (Punches)	3	1:54	2023 ACA Flyweight Grand Prix Quarter-Final bout. Both Kerefov (129.8 lbs / 58.9 kg) and Rakhmonov (128 lbs / 58.1 kg) missed weight.
Middleweight 84 kg	(Russia) Artem Frolov	def.	(Brazil) Cleber Sousa	TKO (Punches to the Body)	2	3:19	
Light Heavyweight 93 kg	(Brazil) Anderson Gonçalves	def.	(Russia) Oleg Olenichev	KO (Punches)	1	0:40	
Preliminary Card
Middleweight 84 kg	(Russia) Murad Abdulaev	def.	(Brazil) Irwing Romero Machado	Decision (Unanimous)	3	5:00	
Featherweight 66 kg	(Belarus) Apti Bimarzaev	def.	(Brazil) Anderson dos Santos	Decision (Unanimous)	3	5:00	
Lightweight 70 kg	(Russia) Abubakar Mestoev	def.	(Russia) Bayzet Khatkhokhu	TKO (Retirement)	2	5:00	
Catchweight 74 kg	(Brazil) Felipe Froes	def.	(Kyrgyzstan) Rinat Sayakbaev	TKO (Retirement)	2	5:00	
Flyweight 57 kg	(Russia) Astemir Nagoev	def.	(Kyrgyzstan) Myrzamidin Pazylov	Decision (Unanimous)	3	5:00	
Lightweight 70 kg	(Russia) Abdul-Rakhman Temirov	def.	(Russia) Vladimir Palchenkov	Decision (Unanimous)	3	5:00	
Catchweight 68 kg	(Brazil) Marcos Rodrigues	def.	(Russia) Zamir Aripshev	Decision (Unanimous)	3	5:00	
Welterweight 77 kg	(Russia) Yakub Sulimanov	def.	(Russia) Amazasp Martirosyan	Decision (Unanimous)	3	5:00	
Featherweight 66 kg	(Russia) Islam Meshev	def.	(Russia) Rustam Asuev	Decision (Unanimous)	3	5:00	

== ACA 163: Mamashov vs. Kolodko ==
ACA 163: Mamashov vs. Kolodko
- Promotion: Absolute Championship Akhmat
- Date: September 22, 2023
- Venue: Falcon Club Arena
- City: Minsk, Belarus

Absolute Championship Akhmat 163: Mamashov vs. Kolodko was a mixed martial arts event held by Absolute Championship Akhmat on September 22, 2023 at the Falcon Club Arena in Minsk, Belarus.

=== Background ===
A quarter-final bout for the 2023 ACA Middleweight Grand Prix between Mikhail Dolgov and Ibragim Magomedov was expected to headline the event. However, Dolgov withdrew for health reasons.

A welterweight bout between Altynbek Mamashov and Ruslan Kolodko was promoted to the new main event.

Bonus awards:

The following fighters were awarded bonuses:

- $50,000 Performance of the Night: Denis Maher
- $25,000 Performance of the Night: Renato Gomes
- $5000 Stoppage Victory Bonuses: Artem Damkovsky | Viktor Makarenko | John Macapá | Sergey Starodub | Alik Albogachiev and Akhmed Khamzaev

=== Results ===
ACA 163
Weight Class				Method	Round	Time	Notes
Welterweight 77 kg	(Belarus) Ruslan Kolodko	def.	(Kyrgyzstan) Altynbek Mamashov	Decision (Split)	3	5:00	
Bantamweight 61 kg	(Ukraine) Aleksandr Podlesniy	def.	(Kyrgyzstan) Alimardan Abdykaarov	Decision (Unanimous)	3	5:00	
Lightweight 70 kg	(Belarus) Artem Damkovsky	def.	(Russia) Lom-Ali Nalgiev	TKO (Leg Injury)	1	2:22	
Lightweight 70 kg	(Belarus) Viktor Makarenko	def.	(Brazil) Guilherme Doin	KO (Punch)	2	3:44	Doin (158.3 lbs / 71.8 kg) missed weight.
Welterweight 77 kg	(Belarus) Denis Maher	def.	(Brazil) Renato Gomes	Decision (Unanimous)	3	5:00	
Preliminary Card
Flyweight 57 kg	(Russia) Aren Akopyan	def.	(Russia) Anatoly Kondratiev	Decision (Unanimous)	3	5:00	
Lightweight 70 kg	(Kyrgyzstan) Jakshylyk Myrzabekov	def.	(Romania) Aurel Pîrtea	Decision (Unanimous)	3	5:00	
Featherweight 66 kg	(Brazil) John Macapá	def.	(Belarus) Alexander Kovalev	TKO (Punches and Elbows)	3	4:35	
Featherweight 66 kg	(Uzbekistan) Otabek Tokhirov	def.	(Russia) Igor Olchonov	Decision (Unanimous)	3	5:00	Tokhirov (150.1 lbs / 68.1 kg) missed weight.
Light Heavyweight 93 kg	(Belarus) Sergey Starodub	def.	(Russia) Batraz Agnaev	TKO (Punches)	2	0:38	
Lightweight 70 kg	(Russia) Alik Albogachiev	def.	(Belarus) Artem Bouloichik	Submission (Triangle Choke)	1	3:16	
Flyweight 57 kg	(Russia) Muso Vistokadamov	def.	(Uzbekistan) Kholmurod Nurmatov	Decision (Split)	3	5:00	
Flyweight 57 kg	(Russia) Akhmed Khamzaev	def.	(Belarus) Dmitri Kostyuchenko	TKO (Retirement)	3	0:15	

== ACA 164: Abdulvakhabov vs. Kokov ==
ACA 164: Abdulvakhabov vs. Kokov
- Promotion: Absolute Championship Akhmat
- Date: October 4, 2023
- Venue: Sports Hall Coliseum
- City: Grozny, Russia

Absolute Championship Akhmat 164: Abdulvakhabov vs. Kokov was a mixed martial arts event held by Absolute Championship Akhmat on October 4, 2023 at the Sports Hall Coliseum in Grozny, Russia.

=== Background ===
An ACA Lightweight Championship unification bout between current champion Abdul-Aziz Abdulvakhabov and interim champion Mukhamed Kokov was booked as the event headliner.

A bantamweight bout between former champion Abdul-Rakhman Dudaev and Cleverson Silva took place at the event.

Bonus awards:

The following fighters were awarded bonuses:

- $50,000 Performance of the Night: Abdul-Aziz Abdulvakhabov and Akhmadkhan Elmurzaev
- $5000 Stoppage Victory Bonuses: Mansur Khatuev and Viktor Azatyan

=== Results ===
ACA 164
Weight Class				Method	Round	Time	Notes
Lightweight 70 kg	(Russia) Abdul-Aziz Abdulvakhabov (c)	def.	(Russia) Mukhamed Kokov (ic)	TKO (Punches)	2	1:55	2023 ACA Lightweight Grand Prix Quarter-Final bout for the Unification of ACA Lightweight Championship
Bantamweight 61 kg	(Russia) Abdul-Rakhman Dudaev	def.	(Brazil) Cleverson Silva	TKO (Punches)	1	2:39	Both Dudaev (140.3 lbs / 63.65 kg) and Silva (141.2 lbs / 64.05 kg) missed weight.
Welterweight 77 kg	(Russia) Khusein Khaliev	def.	(Russia) Mikhail Doroshenko	Decision (Unanimous)	3	5:00	
Heavyweight 120 kg	(Russia) Salimgerey Rasulov	def.	(Brazil) Carlos Felipe	Decision (Unanimous)	3	5:00	Rasulov (272.3 lbs / 123.5 kg) missed weight.
Preliminary Card
Lightweight 70 kg	(Brazil) Davi Ramos	def.	(Russia) Rasul Magomedov	Decision (Unanimous)	3	5:00	
Lightweight 70 kg	(Russia) Daud Shaikhaev	def.	(Brazil) Hacran Dias	Decision (Unanimous)	3	5:00	
Bantamweight 61 kg	(Russia) Murad Kalamov	def.	(Armenia) Ayk Kazaryan	Decision (Split)	3	5:00	
Middleweight 84 kg	(Russia) Arbi Aguev	def.	(Brazil) Caio Bittencourt	Decision (Unanimous)	3	5:00	
Flyweight 57 kg	(Russia) Azamat Pshukov	def.	(Kyrgyzstan) Ryskulbek Ibraimov	Decision (Unanimous)	3	5:00	
Flyweight 57 kg	(Russia) Mansur Khatuev	def.	(Uzbekistan) Zokirjon Khoshimov	Submission (Guillotine Choke)	1	4:04	
Flyweight 57 kg	(Kyrgyzstan) Azatbek Kochorov	def.	(Afghanistan) Abdul Karim Badakhshi	Decision (Unanimous)	3	5:00	
Bantamweight 61 kg	(Russia) Akhmadkhan Elmurzaev	def.	(Uzbekistan) Dildorbek Nurmatov	KO (Punches)	1	1:05	
Featherweight 66 kg	(Russia) Said-Magomed Gimbatov	def.	(Russia) Imam Vitakhanov	Decision (Split)	3	5:00	
Welterweight 77 kg	(Brazil) Vinicius Cruz	def.	(Russia) Zelimkhan Amirov	Decision (Unanimous)	3	5:00	
Flyweight 57 kg	(Russia) Saygid Abdulaev	def.	(Russia) Umalat Israpilov	Decision (Unanimous)	3	5:00	
Welterweight 77 kg	(Armenia) Viktor Azatyan	def.	(Russia) Khamzat Sakalov	Submission (Guillotine Choke)	1	3:11	

== ACA 165: Dakaev vs. Batista ==
ACA 165: Dakaev vs. Batista
- Promotion: Absolute Championship Akhmat
- Date: November 3, 2023
- Venue: Sibur Arena
- City: Saint Petersburg, Russia

Absolute Championship Akhmat 165: Dakaev vs. Batista was a mixed martial arts event held by Absolute Championship Akhmat on November 3, 2023 at the Sibur Arena in Saint Petersburg, Russia.

=== Background ===
A quarter-final bout for the 2023 ACA Lightweight Grand Prix between former Eagle FC Lightweight champion Mehdi Dakaev and Herdeson Batista was booked as the event headliner.

A lightweight bout between former ACB Featherweight champion Yusuf Raisov and former AMC Fight Nights Featherweight champion Alexander Matmuratov served as the co-main event.

Bonus awards:

The following fighters were awarded bonuses:

- $50,000 Performance of the Night: Tony Johnson Jr. and Yusuf Raisov
- $25,000 Performance of the Night: Alexander Matmuratov
- $5000 Stoppage Victory Bonuses: Herdeson Batista, Andrei Koshkin and Evgeny Erokhin

=== Results ===
ACA 165
Weight Class				Method	Round	Time	Notes
Lightweight 70 kg	(Brazil) Herdeson Batista	def.	(Russia) Mehdi Dakaev	TKO (Knees and Punches)	3	2:05	2023 ACA Lightweight Grand Prix Quarter-Final bout
Lightweight 70 kg	(Russia) Yusuf Raisov	def.	(Russia) Alexander Matmuratov	Decision (Unanimous)	3	5:00	
Heavyweight 120 kg	(United States) Tony Johnson Jr.	def.	(Estonia) Denis Smoldarev	KO (Punch)	1	0;21	
Lightweight 70 kg	(Brazil) Herbert Batista	def.	(Russia) Beslan Isaev	Decision (Split)	3	5:00	
Heavyweight 120 kg	(Russia) Alexander Maslov	def.	(Iran) Arash Sadeghi	KO (Punches)	3	1:13	
Preliminary Card
Welterweight 77 kg	(Russia) Andrei Koshkin	def.	(Brazil) Lincoln Henrique	Technical Submission (Rear-Naked Choke)	1	4:42	
Middleweight 84 kg	(Russia) Stanislav Vlasenko	def.	(Russia) Ivan Bogdanov	Decision (Unanimous)	3	5:00	
Welterweight 77 kg	(Russia) Chersi Dudaev	def.	(Brazil) Elias Silvério	Decision (Unanimous)	3	5:00	
Light Heavyweight 93 kg	(Russia) Evgeny Erokhin	def.	(Russia) Gadzhimurad Antigulov	TKO (Punches)	2	0:47	
Lightweight 70 kg	(Russia) Yusup Umarov	def.	(Kyrgyzstan) Ali Mashrapov	Decision (Unanimous)	3	5:00	
Featherweight 66 kg	(Russia) Nikita Podkovalnikov	def.	(Russia) Alberd Zhapuev	Submission (Rear-Naked Choke)	2	4:10	
Bantamweight 61 kg	(Russia) Renat Ondar	def.	(Kyrgyzstan) Bakytbek Duishobaev	Decision (Split)	3	5:00	
Middleweight 84 kg	(Russia) Vladimir Vasilyev	def.	(Brazil) Cleber Sousa	TKO (Elbows)	2	2:43	
Flyweight 57 kg	(Tajikistan) Oyatullo Muminov	def.	(Russia) Sergey Shirkunov	Decision (Unanimous)	3	5:00	
Flyweight 57 kg	(Brazil) Alexsandro Praia	def.	(Russia) Ruslan Tomskikh	Submission (Rear-Naked Choke)	2	1:14	
Bantamweight 61 kg	(Kyrgyzstan) Tagaibek Sayfidinov	def.	(Russia) Nikita Prikhodko	Decision (Split)	3	5:00	

== ACA 166: Magomedov vs. Dolgov ==
ACA 166: Magomedov vs. Dolgov
- Promotion: Absolute Championship Akhmat
- Date: November 24, 2023
- Venue: Sibur Arena
- City: Saint Petersburg, Russia

Absolute Championship Akhmat 166: Magomedov vs. Dolgov was a mixed martial arts event held by Absolute Championship Akhmat on November 24, 2023 at the Sibur Arena in Saint Petersburg, Russia.

=== Background ===
A quarter-final bout for the 2023 ACA Middleweight Grand Prix between Ibragim Magomedov and Mikhail Dolgov headlined the event.

Bonus awards:

The following fighters were awarded bonuses:

- $50,000 Performance of the Night: Pavel Vitruk
- $25,000 Performance of the Night: Vazha Tsiptauri
- $5000 Stoppage Victory Bonuses: Ruslan Gabaraev | Evgeny Galochkin and Amir Elzhurkaev

=== Results ===
ACA 166
Weight Class				Method	Round	Time	Notes
Middleweight 84 kg	(Russia) Ibragim Magomedov	def.	(Russia) Mikhail Dolgov	Decision (Unanimous)	5	5:00	2023 ACA Middleweight Grand Prix Quarter-Final bout
Welterweight 77 kg	(Kyrgyzstan) Edil Esengulov	def.	(Brazil) Vinicius Cruz	TKO (Doctor Stoppage)	4	1:02	2023 ACA Welterweight Grand Prix Quarter-Final bout
Bantamweight 61 kg	(Russia) Pavel Vitruk	def.	(Georgia (country)) Vazha Tsiptauri	Decision (Unanimous)	3	5:00	
Middleweight 84 kg	(Russia) Salamu Abdurakhmanov	def.	(United States) Chris Honeycutt	Decision (Unanimous)	3	5:00	
Heavyweight 120 kg	(Russia) Alikhan Vakhaev	def.	(Russia) Yuriy Fedorov	Decision (Unanimous)	3	5:00	
Preliminary Card
Flyweight 57 kg	(Russia) Askar Askarov	def.	(Brazil) Alan Gomes	Decision (Unanimous)	3	5:00	
Featherweight 66 kg	(Russia) Roman Ogulchansky	def.	(Russia) Mikhail Egorov	Decision (Unanimous)	3	5:00	
Light Heavyweight 93 kg	(Russia) Ruslan Gabaraev	def.	(Russia) Stepan Gorshechnikov	KO (Head Kick)	1	0:22	
Bantamweight 61 kg	(Tajikistan) Mukhitdin Kholov	def.	(Russia) Albert Misikov	Decision (Unanimous)	3	5:00	
Light Heavyweight 93 kg	(Russia) Alexey Efremov	def.	(Croatia) Goran Reljić	TKO (Retirement)	1	5:00	
Bantamweight 61 kg	(Kazakhstan) Igor Zhirkov	def.	(Russia) Dzhaddal Alibekov	Decision (Unanimous)	3	5:00	
Middleweight 84 kg	(Russia) Evgeny Galochkin	def.	(Iran) Keyvan Rezaei Dalini	Submission (Kneebar)	1	1:43	
Lightweight 70 kg	(Russia) Amir Elzhurkaev	def.	(Kyrgyzstan) Rinat Sayakbaev	Submission (Arm-Triangle Choke)	2	4:22	
Flyweight 57 kg	(Uzbekistan) Kholmurod Nurmatov	def.	(Russia) Maxim Fedorov	Decision (Unanimous)	3	5:00	

== ACA 167: Baidulaev vs. Dias ==
ACA 167: Baidulaev vs. Dias
- Promotion: Absolute Championship Akhmat
- Date: December 8, 2023
- Venue: Ufa Arena
- City: Ufa, Russia

Absolute Championship Akhmat 167: Baidulaev vs. Dias was a mixed martial arts event held by Absolute Championship Akhmat on December 8, 2023 at the Ufa Arena in Ufa, Russia.

=== Background ===
An ACA Light Heavyweight Championship bout between current undefeated (12–0) champion Muslim Magomedov and challenger Adlan Ibragimov was booked as the event headliner. However, Magomedov missed weight and was stripped of his title, Ibragimov automatically qualifies for the Grand Prix semi-finals.

As a results, a quarter-final bout for the 2023 ACA Bantamweight Grand Prix between Mehdi Baidulaev and Gilberto Dias was promoted to the main event status.

Bonus awards:

The following fighters were awarded bonuses:

- $50,000 Performance of the Night:
- $25,000 Performance of the Night:
- $5000 Stoppage Victory Bonuses:

=== Results ===
ACA 167
Weight Class				Method	Round	Time	Notes
Bantamweight 61 kg	(Russia) Mehdi Baidulaev	def.	(Brazil) Gilberto Dias	Submission (Brabo Choke)	1	1:04	2023 ACA Bantamweight Grand Prix Quarter-Final bout
Lightweight 70 kg	(Russia) Vener Galiev	def.	(Brazil) Hacran Dias	TKO (Punches)	1	1:20	
Lightweight 70 kg	(Russia) Abubakar Mestoev	def.	(Russia) Ruslan Yamanbaev	TKO (Punches and Knee)	1	1:20	
Welterweight 77 kg	(Kyrgyzstan) Altynbek Mamashov	def.	(Russia) Mikhail Doroshenko	Decision (Unanimous)	3	5:00	
Lightweight 70 kg	(Romania) Aurel Pîrtea	def.	(Brazil) Felipe Froes	Decision (Split)	3	5:00	
Preliminary Card
Featherweight 66 kg	(Russia) Saifulla Dzhabrailov	def.	(Kyrgyzstan) Bakhytbek Duyshobay	KO (Punch)	1	1:03	
Light Heavyweight 93 kg	(Russia) Sulim Batalov	def.	(Brazil) Wildemar Souza	KO (Punches)	1	2:43	
Flyweight 57 kg	(Kyrgyzstan) Daniyar Toychubek	def.	(Brazil) Ruan Miqueias	KO (Punches)	2	2:33	
Welterweight 77 kg	(Russia) Ivan Soloviev	def.	(Brazil) Ciro Rodrigues	TKO (Punches)	2	1:43	
Welterweight 77 kg	(Brazil) Michel Silva	def.	(Italy) Cristian Brinzan	Decision (Split)	3	5:00	

== ACA 168: Gadzhidaudov vs. Tumenov ==
ACA 168: Gadzhidaudov vs. Tumenov
- Promotion: Absolute Championship Akhmat
- Date: December 24, 2023
- Venue: CSKA Arena
- City: Moscow, Russia

Absolute Championship Akhmat 168: Gadzhidaudov vs. Tumenov was a mixed martial arts event held by Absolute Championship Akhmat on December 24, 2023 at the CSKA Arena in Moscow, Russia.

=== Background ===
An ACA Welterweight Championship bout between reigning champion Ustarmagomed Gadzhidaudov and former champion Albert Tumenov was booked as the event headliner.

A quarter-final bout for the 2023 ACA Lightweight Grand Prix between former champion Ali Bagov and 2022 ACA Lightweight Grand Prix runner-up Artem Reznikov served as the co-main event.

A semi-final bout for the 2023 ACA Light Heavyweight Grand Prix between Mikhail Mokhnatkin and former Eagle FC Middleweight champion Faridun Odilov took place at the event.

Bonus awards:

The following fighters were awarded bonuses:

- $50,000 Performance of the Night: Albert Tumenov
- $25,000 Performance of the Night: Ustarmagomed Gadzhidaudov
- $5000 Stoppage Victory Bonuses: Ali Bagov | Faridun Odilov | Artem Frolov | Alimardan Abdykaarov and Vladislav Yankovsky

=== Results ===
ACA 168
Weight Class				Method	Round	Time	Notes
Welterweight 77 kg	(Russia) Albert Tumenov	def.	(Russia) Ustarmagomed Gadzhidaudov (c)	KO (Punches)	5	4:53	2023 ACA Welterweight Grand Prix Semi-Final bout for the ACA Welterweight Championship
Lightweight 70 kg	(Russia) Ali Bagov	def.	(Kazakhstan) Artem Reznikov	TKO (Elbows)	4	4:13	2023 ACA Lightweight Grand Prix Quarter-Final bout
Light Heavyweight 93 kg	(Tajikistan) Faridun Odilov	def.	(Russia) Mikhail Mokhnatkin	TKO (Punches)	3	1:30	2023 ACA Light Heavyweight Grand Prix Semi-Final bout
Middleweight 84 kg	(Russia) Artem Frolov	def.	(Russia) Gadzhimurad Khiramagomedov	Submission (Rear-Naked Choke)	2	2:04	
Lightweight 70 kg	(Russia) Alexey Shurkevich	def.	(Russia) Alexey Makhno	Decision (Unanimous)	3	5:00	
Preliminary Card
Bantamweight 61 kg	(Russia) Rustam Kerimov	def.	(Brazil) Charles Henrique	TKO (Punches)	2	4:06	
Featherweight 66 kg	(Russia) Gleb Khabibulin	def.	(Brazil) Marcos Rodrigues	Decision (Unanimous)	3	5:00	
Bantamrweight 61 kg	(Kyrgyzstan) Alimardan Abdykaarov	def.	(Brazil) Anderson dos Santos	KO (Punch)	1	1:50	
Flyrweight 57 kg	(Tajikistan) Anis Ekubov	def.	(Uzbekistan) Ibrokhim Shoimov	Technical Submission (Rear-Naked Choke)	1	0:25	
Middleweight 84 kg	(Belarus) Vladislav Yankovsky	def.	(Russia) Stanislav Vlasenko	KO (Punches)	2	3:06	
Flyrweight 57 kg	(Russia) Anatoliy Kondratyev	def.	(Afghanistan) Abdul-Karim Badakhshi	TKO (Punches)	1	4:46	
Featherweight 66 kg	(Russia) Islam Meshev	def.	(Georgia (country)) Levan Makashvili	Decision (Unanimous)	3	5:00	
Lightweight 70 kg	(Belarus) Viktor Makarenko	def.	(Ecuador) Javier Basurto	Decision (Unanimous)	3	5:00	
Middleweight 84 kg	(Russia) Bay-Ali Shaipov	def.	(Russia) Azamat Dzhigkaev	Decision (Unanimous)	3	5:00	

== See also ==
- List of current ACA fighters
- 2023 in UFC
- 2023 in Bellator MMA
- 2023 in ONE Championship
- 2023 in Konfrontacja Sztuk Walki
- 2023 in Rizin Fighting Federation
- 2023 in LUX Fight League
- 2023 in Brave Combat Federation
- 2023 in Professional Fighters League
- 2023 in Legacy Fighting Alliance
- 2023 in Road FC
