= Prados (disambiguation) =

Prados may refer to:

== People ==
- Emilio Prados (1899–1962), Spanish poet and editor
- John Prados (1951-2022), American writer
- Rafael Clavero Prados (born 1977), Spanish footballer

== Places ==
- Los Prados, a sector of Santo Domingo, Dominican Republic
- Prados (Celorico da Beira), a parish in Celorico da Beira Municipality, Portugal
- Prados, Minas Gerais, Brazil

== See also ==
- Prado (disambiguation)
