= List of current Absolute Championship Akhmat fighters =

Absolute Championship Akhmat (ACA), formerly known as Absolute Championship Berkut, is a Russian mixed martial arts, kickboxing and brazilian jiu-jitsu organization. It is one of the leading promotions in Europe.

This list is an up-to-date roster of those fighters currently under contract with the ACA League. Fighters are organized by weight class and within their weight class by their number of fights with the promotion.

Each fight record has four categories: wins, losses, draws, and no-contests. All fight records in this article are displayed in that order, with fights resulting in a no-contest listed in parentheses.

== Fighters ==
=== Heavyweight (120 kg, 265 Ib) ===
	Name	Age	Nickname	MMA record	ACA record	Year of Last ACA fight
Russia	Evgeniy Goncharov (C)	40		24–3 (1)	10–1 (1)	2026
Estonia	Denis Smoldarev	36		18–14	5–9	2026
United States	Tony Johnson	40	Hulk	18–11–1 (1)	6–7 (1)	2026
Russia	Salimgerey Rasulov	39	Gubden Tank	23–12	5–5	2026
Russia	Mukhamad Vakhaev	36		13–9–1	5–5	2026
Russia	Alikhan Vakhaev	33		16–3	8–1	2026
Russia	Adam Bogatyrev	31		10–6	4–5	2026
Russia	Yuriy Fedorov	34	Ragnar	11–7 (1)	2–4 (1)	2026
Brazil	Carlos Felipe	31	Boi	13–7	2–5	2024
Russia	Kirill Kornilov	35		20–3–1	5–2	2026
Iran	Arash Sadeghi	N/A		5–2	2–2	2026
Russia	Zumso Zuraev	32		10–0 (1)	5–0 (1)	2026
Russia	Anton Vyazigin	N/A	Cherepovets Giant	18–6 (1)	3–2 (1)	2026
Azerbaijan	Ruslan Medzhidov	28		11–6	2–3	2026
Brazil	Klidson Abreu	33	White Bear	17–9 (2)	1–4 (2)	2026
Russia	Khadis Ibragimov	31		11–7	1–1	2026
Belarus	Kirill Grishenko	35		9–2	1–0	2026
(Egypt)	Hamdy Abdelwahab	33	The Hammer	7–2 (1)	0–1	2026
Brazil	Jailton Almeida	35	Malhadinho	22–6	0–1	2026
Nigeria	Mohammed Usman	37	The Motor	11–4	0–0	2026

=== Light Heavyweight (93.4 kg, 206 Ib) ===
	Name	Age	Nickname	MMA record	ACA record	Year of Last ACA fight
Russia	Muslim Magomedov (C)	31		16–0	12–0	2026
Russia	Adlan Ibragimov	37		9–3	5–3	2026
Russia	Alexey Efremov	39		23–15–1	3–7	2024
Russia	Grigor Matevosyan	33		14–6	10–4	2026
Russia	Arbi Aguev	38	Monster	40–13 (2)	7–6	2026
Russia	Oleg Olenichev	34		18–13	4–7	2026
Brazil	Leonardo Silva	34	Cabeção	22–7	5–3	2024
Russia	Artur Astakhov	38		22–10	4–4	2024
Russia	Elkhan Musaev	N/A		10–3	5–3	2026
Russia	Evgeny Erokhin	40		26–13 (1)	3–7 (1)	2026
Russia	Elmar Gasanov	N/A		12–1l2	6–2	2026
Tajikistan	Faridun Odilov	34	Terminator	21–4–2	7–2	2026
Brazil	Wagner Prado	38	Caldeirão	18–8–1	2–3	2024
Russia	Sulim Batalov	31		11–1	7–1	2026
Russia	Stepan Gorshechnikov	N/A		9–7	1–3	2024
Russia	Ruslan Gabaraev	N/A		7–3	3–3	2026
Brazil	Caio Bittencourt	35	Leão	18–11	4–4	2026
Mexico	Jorge Gonzalez	N/A	George St.	17–5	1–2	2024
Belarus	Sergey Starodub	N/A		4–2	1–2	2024
Russia	Artem Dushenko	N/A		7–2	3–1	2026
Russia	Maxim Grishin	42	Maximus	34–13–2	2–1	2026
Russia	Vitaly Bigdash	42		14–5	2–2	2026

=== Middleweight (84.4 kg, 186 Ib) ===
	Name	Age	Nickname	MMA record	ACA record	Year of Last ACA fight
Russia	Magomedrasul Gasanov (C)	31		20–2	8–0	2024
Russia	Artem Frolov	35		20–6	8–5	2024
Russia	Gadzhimurad Khiramagomedov	35		14–6	8–4	2024
Russia	Abdul-Rakhman Dzhanaev	36		18–4	8–3	2024
Russia	Ibragim Magomedov	31		12–3	8–3	2024
Russia	Mikhail Dolgov	29	Misha	13–7	7–5	2024
(Bulgaria)	Nikola Dipchikov	42		24–11 (1)	7–4 (1)	2024
Russia	Khusein Kushagov	N/A		17–9	6–4	2024
Russia	Murad Abdulaev	36		23–11	5–5	2024
Russia	Vitaly Slipenko	31		16–6	6–3	2024
Russia	Stanislav Vlasenko	33		17–8	4–5	2024
United States	Chris Honeycutt	38	The Cutt	15–8 (1)	3–5	2024
Russia	Salamu Abdurakhmanov	33		15–3	5–2	2024
Belarus	Vladislav Yankovsky	N/A		10–3	4–3	2024
Russia	Vladimir Vasilyev	27	Tot Samyy	12–4–1	2–2	2024
Russia	Bay-Ali Shaipov	N/A		9–3	2–2	2024
Russia	Azamat Dzhigkaev	N/A		9–5	1–3	2024
Russia	Ivan Bogdanov	28		16–3	2–1	2024
Brazil	Anderson Gonçalves	39	Big Bones	13–6	1–2	2024
Brazil	Ewerton Polaquini	32	Hulk	9–6–1	1–2	2024
Russia	Shamil Abdulaev	36		15–1	2–0	2024
Russia	Sergey Kalinin	N/A		10–2	2–0	2024
Russia	Ramazan Emeev	39	Gorets	21–6	1–0	2024

=== Welterweight (77.6 kg, 171 Ib ) ===
	Name	Age	Nickname	MMA record	ACA record	Year of Last ACA fight
Russia	Albert Tumenov (C)	34	Einstein	24–4	5–0	2023
Brazil	Elias Silvério	39	Xuxu	20–11–1	5–7	2024
Russia	Adlan Bataev	33		18–5	7–3	2024
Russia	Ustarmagomed Gadzhidaudov	35		17–7	7–3	2023
Russia	Andrei Koshkin	35		23–11	5–5	2024
Russia	Chersi Dudaev	36		17–2	8–1	2024
Russia	Yusup Umarov	35		19–8	4–3	2024
Russia	Anatoly Boyko	27		12–2	5–1	2024
Czech Republic	Vítězslav Rajnoch	32		10–7	2–4	2024
Brazil	Renato Gomes	39	Pezinho	28–18	1–5	2024
Italy	Cristian Brinzan	32		10–9	1–5	2024
Kyrgyzstan	Jakshylyk Myrzabekov	27	Kyrgyz Bars	13–2	4–1	2024
Brazil	Vinicius Cruz	36		13–6–1	3–2	2024
Russia	Mikhail Doroshenko	33		11–8 (1)	0–5	2024
(Belarus)	Ruslan Kolodko	40		15–11	2–2	2024
Brazil	Lincoln Puig	31		12–7	1–3	2024
Russia	Yakub Sulimanov	N/A		6–0	3–0	2024
(Belarus)	Denis Maher	31		12–1	3–0	2024
Russia	Alexey Shurkevich	34		16–6	3–0	2024
Armenia	Viktor Azatyan	30		14–4	3–0	2024
Russia	Ivan Soloviev	33		11–1	2–1	2024
Russia	Alexey Makhno	36	Ataman	29–14	2–1	2024
Brazil	Michel Silva	36	Sassarito	25–12–1	1–2	2024
Russia	Zelimkhan Amirov	29		11–4	1–2	2024
Russia	Khamzat Sakalov	34		9–5	0–3	2024
Russia	Amazasp Martirosyan	28		5–2	1–1	2024
Kyrgyzstan	Edil Esengulov	27	Issyk-Kul Dragon	21–6–1 (1)	1–1	2024
Russia	Evgeniy Galochkin	N/A		4–1	1–1	2024
Brazil	Michel Prazeres	45	Trator	27–6	0–2	2024
Russia	Marat Gafurov	41	Cobra	20–4	1–0	2024
Russia	Uzair Abdurakov	31		18–1–1	1–0	2024
Slovakia	Gábor Boráros	34	Punisher	20–11–1	0–1	2024

=== Lightweight (70.8 kg, 156 Ib) ===
	Name	Age	Nickname	MMA record	ACA record	Year of Last ACA fight
Russia	Abdul-Aziz Abdulvakhabov (C)	37	Lion	21–2	6–0	2024
Romania	Aurel Pîrtea	38	The Miner	28–15 (1)	10–5	2024
Russia	Mukhamed Kokov	33		20–10	6–7	2024
Brazil	Herdeson Batista	34	Capoeira	21–7 (1)	8–3	2024
Russia	Daud Shaikhaev	N/A		17–5	8–2	2024
Russia	Amirkhan Adaev	N/A	Predator	22–5	8–2	2024
Russia	Alexander Matmuratov	36		16–7	7–3	2024
Russia	Vener Galiev	51		38–16	6–4	2024
Russia	Abdul-Rakhman Temirov	N/A		17–8	5–5	2024
Russia	Bayzet Khatkhokhu	35		10–8	5–5	2024
Russia	Ramazan Kishev	34		18–7	5–5	2024
Russia	Ali Bagov	36	Hulk	34–11 (1)	7–2 (1)	2024
Brazil	Hacran Dias	42	Barnabe	27–12–1	3–6	2024
Russia	Bibert Tumenov	29	Bounty Hunter	14–2	7–1	2024
Russia	Yusuf Raisov	31	Borz	21–3	6–2	2023
Kazakhstan	Artem Reznikov	34		25–8	6–2	2024
Russia	Lom-Ali Nalgiev	35		22–12	4–4	2024
Belarus	Artem Damkovsky	43		25–17	2–6	2024
Russia	Pavel Gordeev	32		21–5 (1)	4–3	2024
Brazil	Herbert Batista	35	Matagal	18–6–1	3–4	2024
Belarus	Viktor Makarenko	32		11–1	4–1	2024
Brazil	Davi Ramos	39	The Tasmanian Devil	12–7	2–3	2024
Kyrgyzstan	Bekbolot Abdylda Uulu	32	Pan	19–14	0–4	2024
Russia	Vladimir Palchenkov	N/A		13–7–2	0–4	2024
Russia	Amir Elzhurkaev	31	Bullet	9–2	2–1	2024
Russia	Ali Abdulkhalikov	33		15–3	2–1	2024
Russia	Imam Vitakhanov	28	Jackpot	10–3	2–1	2024
Russia	Islam Isaev	N/A		9–5 (1)	1–2	2024
Russia	Basir Saraliev	31	Ozden	8–1	2–0	2024
Russia	Ali Suleymanov	25		12–1	2–0	2024
Russia	Rasul Magomedov	N/A	Achilles	14–4	1–1	2024
Kyrgyzstan	Ali Mashrapov	30		16–14	1–1	2024
Russia	Alik Albogachiev	N/A		7–3	1–1	2024
Belarus	Mikhail Odintsov	34	No Name	19–3	1–0	2024
Brazil	Raush Manfio	34	Cavalo de Guerra	17–7	0–1	2024
(United States)	Brent Primus	41		16–5 (1)	0–0	2026

=== Featherweight (66.2 kg, 146 Ib) ===
	Name	Age	Nickname	MMA record	ACA record	Year of Last ACA fight
Russia	Islam Omarov (C)	29		15–0	8–0	2024
Russia	Abdul-Rakhman Dudaev	N/A		33–9	11–5	2024
Brazil	Cleverson Silva	35	Carrilho	18–11	7–8	2024
Brazil	Felipe Froes	34	Saiyajin	25–8–1	9–4	2024
Russia	Alexey Polpudnikov	34	Gladiator	35–10–1	8–5	2024
Russia	Islam Meshev	36		14–7	7–5	2024
(Georgia (country))	Levan Makashvili	37	The Hornet	20–9–1	5–7	2024
Brazil	Rodrigo Praia	34		18–10	5–7	2024
Brazil	Daniel Oliveira	39	Jubileu	29–13–1	5–6	2024
Russia	Alikhan Suleimanov	N/A		16–4	8–1	2024
Russia	Rustam Kerimov	34		20–1	8–1	2024
Russia	Kurban Taygibov	N/A		14–4	6–3	2024
Azerbaijan	Tural Ragimov	38	Iron Man	11–8	5–4	2024
Russia	Nashkho Galaev	34		22–10	5–4	2024
Belarus	Apti Bimarzaev	34		19–5	6–2	2024
Kyrgyzstan	Alimardan Abdykaarov	30		21–9–1	5–2	2024
Tajikistan	Davlatmand Chuponov	31		11–5	4–3	2024
Brazil	Denis Silva	31	Alagoas	19–8	3–4	2024
Russia	Roman Ogulchansky	34		13–6–1	4–2	2024
Brazil	Marcos Rodrigues	39	Marajó	23–7	4–2	2024
Brazil	Carlos Augusto	32	Sparta	22–6	3–3	2024
Brazil	John Macapá	39	Macapá	27–10–2	2–3	2024
Russia	Saifulla Dzhabrailov	35		16–2	3–1	2024
Russia	Nikita Prikhodko	N/A		10–3	1–3	2024
Russia	Igor Olchonov	28		6–6	1–3	2024
Russia	Yusup-Khadzhi Zubariev	31		13–3–1	3–0	2024
Russia	Gleb Khabibulin	33		9–2–2	2–1	2024
Russia	Mikhail Egorov	N/A		7–3	1–2	2024
Russia	Said-Magomed Gimbatov	31		9–4	1–2	2024
Brazil	Luis Rafael Laurentino	33	Japa	36–7	0–3	2024
Brazil	Anderson dos Santos	41	Berinja	25–12	0–3	2024
Russia	Khasan Dadalov	27		15–2	2–0	2024
Russia	Rustam Asuev	N/A		9–2	1–1	2024
Russia	Arsen Shibzukhov	31		5–4	0–2	2024
Kazakhstan	Bagdos Olzhabay	30	Jauynger	16–4	1–0	2024

=== Bantamweight (61.7 kg, 136 Ib) ===
	Name	Nickname	MMA record	ACA record	Year of Last ACA fight
(Ukraine)	Pavel Vitruk (C)		19–6–1	7–3	2024
Brazil	Josiel Silva	Sobrinho	21–7	10–6	2024
Russia	Murad Kalamov		19–7	9–5	2024
Brazil	Maycon Silvan	Boca	18–9	5–6	2024
Russia	Goga Shamatava		22–12	4–8	2024
Brazil	Charles Henrique	Blackout	16–6	6–5	2024
Russia	Mehdi Baydulaev		18–2	9–1	2024
Russia	Oleg Borisov		27–7–1	6–4	2024
(Georgia (country))	Vazha Tsiptauri		14–6–1	5–5	2024
Brazil	Francisco Maciel	De Assis	17–10–1	3–7	2024
Kazakhstan	Igor Zhirkov	Golden Tiger	14–8	4–5	2024
Russia	Akhmed Musakaev		12–3	6–2	2024
Tajikistan	Osimkhon Rakhmonov		11–4	6–2	2024
Russia	Makharbek Karginov		17–4	5–3	2024
Russia	Aleksandr Podlesniy		22–8–2	5–1	2023
Slovakia	Tomáš Deák		23–13–1	3–3	2024
Armenia	Ayk Kazaryan	Arm	14–4	3–2	2024
Russia	Dzhambulat Zelimkhanov	Boets	14–2	4–0	2024
Russia	Murad Magomedov		14–0	4–0	2024
Russia	Tamerlan Kulaev		13–2	3–1	2024
Russia	Dzhaddal Alibekov		9–3	2–2	2024
Russia	Albert Misikov		6–2	2–2	2024
Russia	Renat Ondar	Bulldozer	13–4	3–0	2024
Russia	Islam Yunusov	Zubilo	11–4	1–0	2024
Russia	Timur Valiev	The Lucky	18–4 (1)	0–1	2024

=== Flyweight (57.2 kg, 126 Ib) ===
	Name	Nickname	MMA record	ACA record	Year of Last ACA fight
Russia	Kurban Gadzhiev (C)	Python	20–3	6–1	2024
Russia	Mansur Khatuev	Malysh	14–5	7–5	2024
Russia	Imran Bukuev		16–3	8–2	2024
Russia	Azamat Pshukov		13–3	7–3	2024
(Armenia)	Aren Akopyan		17–3–1 (1)	8–1	2024
Russia	Rasul Albaskhanov		14–7 (1)	6–3	2024
Ukraine	Ruslan Abiltarov	The Predator	25–13–1	4–5	2024
Brazil	Alan Gomes de Castro		15–6–1	4–5	2024
Kyrgyzstan	Ryskulbek Ibraimov		23–16	3–6	2024
Tajikistan	Azam Gaforov		15–4	4–4	2024
Russia	Azamat Kerefov		17–1	6–1	2024
Brazil	Alexsandro Praia		9–5	3–4	2024
Belarus	Andrey Kalechits		6–6	1–5	2024
Russia	Anatoly Kondratiev		12–4	4–1	2024
Russia	Astemir Nagoev		8–0	4–0	2024
Tajikistan	Anis Ekubov		8–1	4–0	2024
Uzbekistan	Kholmurod Nurmatov	Warrior	14–7–1	2–2	2024
Russia	Muso Vistokadamov		10–6	1–3	2024
(Afghanistan)	Abdul Karim Badakhshi	The Rock	7–3	1–3	2024
Brazil	Ruan Miqueias	Hunter	8–4	0–4	2024
Tajikistan	Oyatullo Muminov		12–4	2–1	2024
Russia	Akhmed Khamzaev	Black Angel	11–1	2–1	2024
Russia	Vartan Asatryan	Corsair	27–10	2–1	2024
Armenia	Mkhitar Barseghyan		6–4	1–2	2024
Russia	Saygid Abdulaev		10–2	2–0	2024
Tajikistan	Emomakhdi Orzuzoda		5–3	1–1	2024
Russia	Umalat Israpilov	Lion Heart	16–5	1–1	2024
Tajikistan	Masud Zamonov	Black Spider	10–3	1–1	2024
Uzbekistan	Zokirjon Khoshimov		11–8	0–2	2024
Russia	Askar Askarov	Bullet	15–1–1	1–0	2023
Russia	Ramzan Suleymanov		8–0	1–0	2024

(C)	Indicates the current champion

- Unless otherwise cited, all records are retrieved from tapology.com.
- Unless otherwise cited, all fighters listed are retrieved from aca-mma.com.

== See also ==
- List of ACA champions
- List of ACA events
- 2026 in Absolute Championship Akhmat
- List of current UFC fighters
- List of current Brave CF fighters
- List of current Invicta FC fighters
- List of current KSW fighters
- List of current Oktagon MMA fighters
- List of current ONE fighters
- List of current PFL fighters
- List of current Rizin FF fighters
- List of current Road FC fighters
