= Julio Márquez de Prado =

Spanish magistrate (1948–2021)

Julio Márquez de Prado Pérez

President of the High Court of Justice of Extremadura
- In office 16 January 2004 – 2019
- Preceded by: Ángel Juanes Peces
- Succeeded by: María Félix Tena

Personal details
- Born: 25 June 1948 Badajoz, Spain
- Died: 23 February 2021 (aged 72)
- Education: Autonomous University of Madrid
- Occupation: Magistrate
- Known for: President of the Extremaduran High Court of Justice

Julio Márquez de Prado Pérez (25 June 1948 – 23 February 2021), was a Spanish magistrate, president of the Extremaduran High Court of Justice between 2004 and 2020.

Márquez de Prado was born in Badajoz on 25 June 1948 and graduated in Law from the Autonomous University of Madrid. At the age of 25 years approved the examination for judge, being his first assignment in Pozoblanco in 1974. He was assigned as a judge to Zafra and Bilbao, becoming a magistrate in the Audience of Córdoba and later the Provincial Audience of de Sevilla.

On 3 December 2003, the General Council of the Judiciary named him president of the High Court of Justice of Extremadura and took office on 16 January 2004 succeeding Ángel Juanes Peces, being re-elected in 2009 and 2014. He left the office in 2019 when he was succeeded by the first female president of the High Court María Félix Tena.

He died on 23 February 2021 at the age of 72 from a heart disease.

== Decorations ==
- Cross of Honor of the Order of St. Raymond of Peñafort (2011)
