= El Prado =

El Prado can refer to:

Places:

- El Prado Museum, in Madrid, Spain
- El Prado, California, a former town in the United States
- El Prado, New Mexico, an unincorporated suburb of Taos, Taos County, New Mexico, USA
- El Prado District, one of thirteen districts of the province San Miguel in Peru
- El Prado, Veraguas, Panama
- El Prado Complex, a section of Balboa Park in San Diego, California

Other:

- El Prado (horse), Irish Thoroughbred racehorse and Champion sire in the United States

See also

- Prado (disambiguation)
