= Prado (disambiguation) =

The Prado in Madrid, officially the Museo Nacional del Prado, is the main Spanish national art museum.

Prado may also refer to:

== Places ==
=== Italy ===
- Monte Prado, a mountain in northern Italy
- Prado, a locality in Pavia, Italy

=== Spain ===
- Prado (Cabrales), a parish in Cabrales
- Paseo del Prado, a historic site in Madrid
- Prado, Spain, a municipality in Zamora

=== United States ===
- Prado Dam, a dam near Corona, California
- El Prado Complex, a promenade in Balboa Park in San Diego, California

=== Uruguay ===
- Prado, Montevideo, a neighbourhood in Montevideo
- Parque Prado, a park in Montevideo

=== Elsewhere ===
- Prado, Bahia, a municipality in the state of Bahia, Brazil
- Prado, Tolima, a town in Colombia
- Paseo del Prado, Havana, a street in Cuba
- Prado, a beach in Marseille, France
- Prado (Melgaço), a parish in Melgaço, Portugal

== Train stations ==
- Prado (TransMilenio), a station of the TransMilenio mass-transit system of Bogotá, Colombia
- Prado (Medellín Metro), a station of the metro system of Medellín, Colombia
- Lo Prado metro station, Santiago, Chile
- Rond-Point du Prado, a Marseille Metro station

== Other uses ==
- Prado (footballer, born 1940), Antônio Francisco Bueno do Prado, Brazilian football forward
- Prado (footballer, born 1999), Sara Bilumbu Luvunga, Angolan women's football midfielder
- Prado (surname), a surname
- Prado (murderer) (died 1888), Spanish murderer executed in France by guillotine
- PRADO (framework), a PHP application development framework
- Public Register of Travel and Identity Documents Online of the Council of the European Union
- Toyota Land Cruiser Prado, a four-wheel-drive vehicle
- SS Prado (1891) a French merchant ship in service in 1911, subsequently a French Navy transport ship 1911–23

== See also ==
- Bardo (disambiguation)#Places, Arabic derivate
- el Prado (disambiguation)
- Lo Prado, Santiago, Chile
- Prada
- Prade
- Villa del Prado (disambiguation)
