= Villa del Prado (disambiguation) =

Villa del Prado refers to Villa del Prado, a Spanish municipality.

It can also refer to:

== Places ==
- Villa del Prado, Baja California, a Baja California city
- Villa del Prado, Córdoba, a municipality in the province of Córdoba, Argentina.

== See also ==
- Prado (disambiguation)
