= Azamat Kerefov =

Russian mixed martial arts fighter

- Born: Азамат Керефов; May 17, 1991 (age 35); Nalchik, Kabardino-Balkaria, Russia
- Height: 5 ft 9 in (1.75 m)
- Weight: 125 lb (57 kg; 8 st 13 lb)
- Division: Flyweight
- Fighting out of: Nalchik, Russia
- Team: Gladiator Fight Team
- Years active: 2014–present

Mixed martial arts record
- Total: 18
- Wins: 17
- By knockout: 4
- By submission: 2
- By decision: 11
- Losses: 1
- By knockout: 1

Other information
- Mixed martial arts record from Sherdog

Azamat Kerefov (Russian: Азамат Керефов; born May 17, 1991) is a Russian mixed martial artist who competes in the Flyweight division of the ACA, where he is the former ACA Flyweight Champion. Fight Matrix had him ranked a top 10 flyweight in the world from July 2020 till October 2022. He is ranked #3 in the ACA flyweight rankings.

== Mixed martial arts career ==
Kerefov started his career as a professional fighter in mixed martial arts in 2014. His debut took place in the TFC - Gladiator Fights tournament, where he met with Andrey Khugaev, Kerefov finished his opponent at the end of the fourth minute of the first round . He fought with various promotions, such as ACB, ACA, ProFC, Tech-Krep FC, TFC - Gladiator Fights, Heat - Heat 41.

On April 22, 2017, Kerefov made his ACA debut at the ACB 58: Young Eagles 17 tournament, finishing his opponent, a fighter from Belgium, Hamid Sultanbiev, with a choke hold in the second round.

Kerefov won his next three bouts in ACA via decisions, against Kurban Gadzhiev, Narek Avagyan, and Goga Shamatava.

On February 21, 2020 at the ACA 104: Goncharov vs. Vakhaev won the ACA flyweight champion belt, defeating the titled Russian fighter, ACB flyweight contender, Mansur Khatuev, by unanimous decision.

On November 6, 2020 at the ACA 113: Kerefov vs. Gadzhiev, Kerefov defended the ACA Flyweight Championship in a fight against challenger Kurban Gadzhiez. Azamat Kerefov won by unanimous decision.

Azamat was expected to make his second title defense against the #3 ranked Rasul Albaskhanov at ACA 121: Kerefov vs. Albaskhanov on April 9, 2021. However, 2 days before Kerefov had to withdraw from the bout due to health issues. The bout was rescheduled for ACA 127: Kerefov vs. Albaskhanov on August 28, 2021. Kerefov won the fight by a third-round technical submission.

After the bout, Kerefov vacated the ACA Flyweight Championship in order to test free agency.

Kerefov faced Felipe Pereira on October 20, 2022 at UAE Warriors 34. He won the bout via unanimous decision.

Kerefov was scheduled to face former UFC Top 5 contender Askar Askarov on July 21, 2023 at ACA 160 as part of the 2023 ACA Flyweight Grand Prix, however the bout was scrapped after Askarov had to pull out due to medical issues.

Kerefov faced Osimkhon Rakhmonov on September 2, 2023 at ACA 162 as part of the 2023 ACA Flyweight Grand Prix. At weigh-ins, Both Kerefov (129.8 lbs / 58.9 kg) and Rakhmonov (128 lbs / 58.1 kg) missed weight, with Kerefov being fined 50% and Rakhmonov being fined a 30% of his purse. He won the bout via TKO stoppage in the third round.

== Championships and accomplishments ==
=== Mixed martial arts ===
- Absolute Championship Akhmat
  - ACA Flyweight Championship (One time)
    - Two successful title defenses
- Tech-Krep FC
  - PRIME Selection 2016 Tournament Championship (One time)

== Mixed martial arts record ==
Professional record breakdown
18 matches	17 wins	1 loss
By knockout	4	1
By submission	2	0
By decision	11	0

Res.	Record	Opponent	Method	Event	Date	Round	Time	Location	Notes
Loss	17–1	Anatoliy Kondratyev	KO (punch and elbows)	ACA 182	December 14, 2024	2	3:47	Moscow, Russia	
Win	17–0	Osimkhon Rakhmonov	TKO (punches)	ACA 162	September 2, 2023	3	1:54	Krasnodar, Russia	2023 ACA Flyweight Grand Prix Quarterfinal; both fighters missed weight (129.8 lb).
Win	16–0	Felipe Pereira	Decision (unanimous)	UAE Warriors 34	October 20, 2022	3	5:00	Abu Dhabi, United Arab Emirates	Bantamweight bout.
Win	15–0	Rasul Albaskhanov	Technical Submission (brabo choke)	ACA 127	August 28, 2021	3	3:11	Krasnodar, Russia	Defended the ACA Flyweight Championship.
Win	14–0	Kurban Gadzhiev	Decision (unanimous)	ACA 113	November 6, 2020	5	5:00	Moscow, Russia	Defended the ACA Flyweight Championship.
Win	13–0	Mansur Khatuev	Decision (unanimous)	ACA 104	February 21, 2020	5	5:00	Krasnodar, Russia	Won the vacant ACA Flyweight Championship.
Win	12–0	Goga Shamatava	Decision (split)	ACA 97	August 31, 2019	3	5:00	Krasnodar, Russia	
Win	11–0	Narek Avagyan	Decision (unanimous)	ACA 94	March 30, 2019	3	5:00	Krasnodar, Russia	
Win	10–0	Kurban Gadzhiev	Decision (unanimous)	ACB 89	September 8, 2018	3	5:00	Krasnodar, Russia	
Win	9–0	Takeshi Kasugai	Decision (split)	HEAT 41	December 23, 2017	4	5:00	Nagoya, Japan	Flyweight debut.
Win	8–0	Khamid Sultanbiev	Decision (unanimous)	ACB 58	April 22, 2017	3	5:00	Khasavyurt, Russia	
Win	7–0	Aren Akopyan	Decision (unanimous)	Tech-Krep FC: PRIME Selection 2016 Finals	October 29, 2016	3	5:00	Krasnodar, Russia	
Win	6–0	Evgeny Bondarev	Decision (unanimous)	Tech-Krep FC: PRIME Selection 2016 Stage 3	August 5, 2016	2	5:00	Krasnodar, Russia	
Win	5–0	Abdulkar Kadilov	KO (punches)	Tech-Krep FC: PRIME Selection 2016 Stage 2	July 7, 2016	1	2:23	Krasnodar, Russia	
Win	4–0	Nemat Mamedov	TKO (punches)	Armavir MMA Federation: Battle on the Kuban	June 5, 2016	1	2:23	Krasnodar, Russia	
Win	3–0	Shamil Magomedov	TKO (punches)	PFC Gladiator 2	September 26, 2015	1	3:08	Kabardino-Balkaria, Russia	
Win	2–0	Khasan Galaev	Decision (unanimous)	Battle on Akhtuba 1	October 4, 2014	3	5:00	Volgograd, Russia	
Win	1–0	Andrey Khugaev	Submission (armbar)	Gladiator Fights 2014	July 4, 2014	1	3:40	Nalchik, Russia	Bantamweight debut.

== See also ==
- List of current ACA fighters
- List of male mixed martial artists
- List of undefeated mixed martial artists
