= Elias Silvério =

Brazilian mixed martial artist

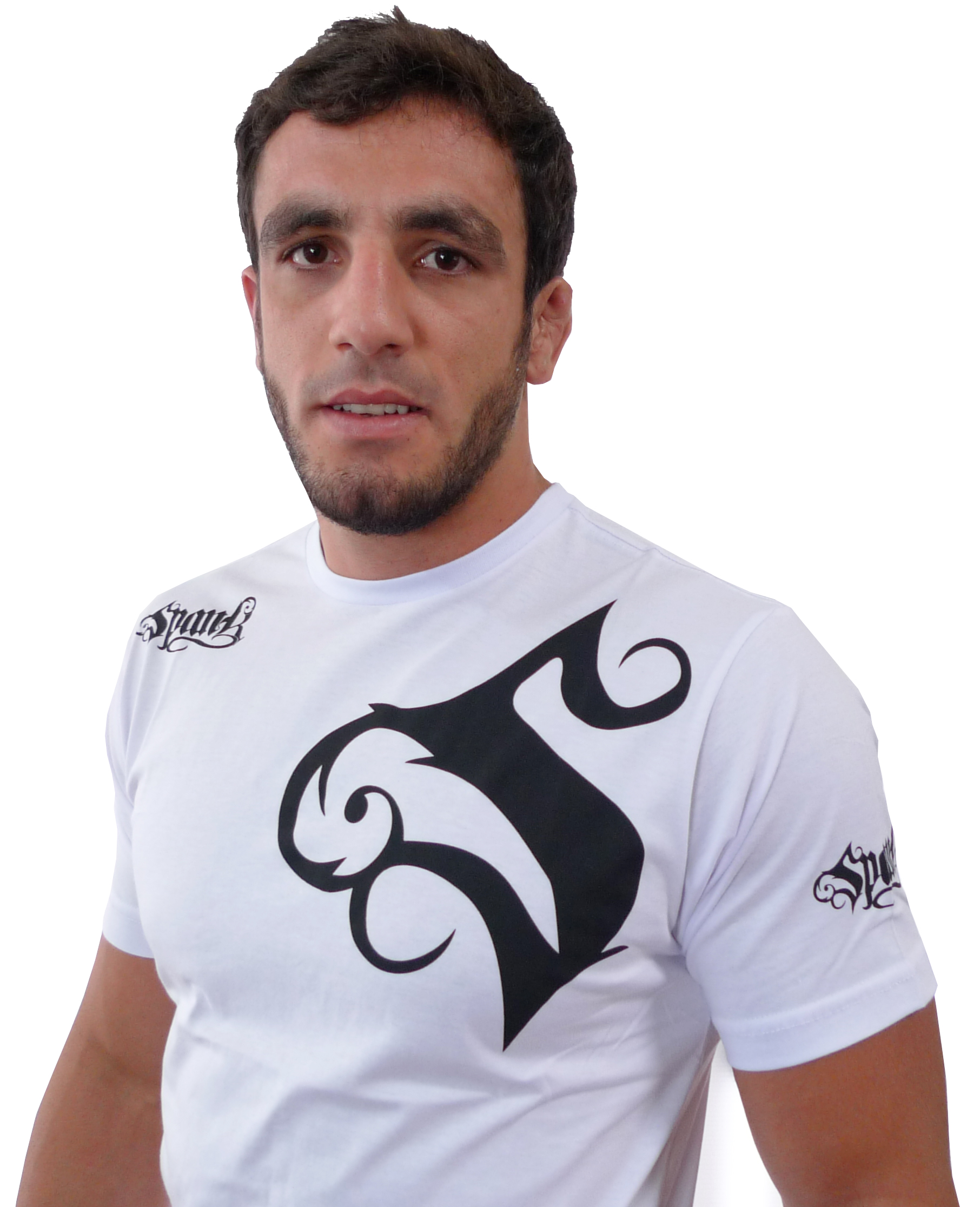
- Portrait of Elias Silvério
- Born: Elias José Silvério de Oliveira; September 22, 1986 (age 40); Pirapora do Bom Jesus, São Paulo, Brazil
- Nickname: Xuxu
- Height: 5 ft 11 in (1.80 m)
- Weight: 171.1 lb (77.6 kg; 12.22 st)
- Division: Welterweight; Lightweight
- Reach: 73.0 in (185 cm)
- Stance: Orthodox
- Fighting out of: São Paulo, Brazil
- Team: Elias Silvério Team (2011–present); Alvaro de Aguiar Team; Barbosinha Team
- Rank: Black Belt in Brazilian Jiu Jitsu under Marco Barbosa
- Years active: 2011–present

Mixed martial arts record
- Total: 36
- Wins: 22
- By knockout: 4
- By submission: 3
- By decision: 15
- Losses: 13
- By knockout: 2
- By submission: 1
- By decision: 10
- Draws: 1

Other information
- Mixed martial arts record from Sherdog

Elias José Silvério de Oliveira (born September 22, 1986) is a Brazilian mixed martial artist currently competing in the Welterweight division of Absolute Championship Akhmat. A professional since 2011, he has formerly competed for the UFC and Jungle Fight. He is the former Jungle Fight Welterweight Champion.

== Mixed martial arts career ==
=== Early career ===
Silvério made his professional mixed martial arts debut on September 17, 2011, when he faced Bruno Tavares at Fight Show: MMA 1. He won the fight via unanimous decision. Following this, Silvério would compile an undefeated record of 8–0, also capturing the Jungle Fight Welterweight Championship from Júnior Orgulho at Jungle Fight 52. Silvério would vacate the title in August 2013, when he signed with the Ultimate Fighting Championship.

=== Ultimate Fighting Championship ===
In his debut, Silvério replaced an injured Kenny Robertson and he faced João Zeferino at UFC Fight Night: Teixeira vs. Bader on September 4, 2013. He won the fight via unanimous decision.

For his second fight in the promotion, Silvério faced Isaac Vallie-Flagg at UFC Fight Night: Rockhold vs. Philippou on January 15, 2014. He won the fight via unanimous decision.

Silvério then faced Ernest Chavez at The Ultimate Fighter: Brazil 3 Finale on May 31, 2014. He won the fight via rear-naked choke submission, bringing his undefeated record to 11–0.

Silvério faced Rashid Magomedov on December 20, 2014 at UFC Fight Night 58. He lost the fight via TKO in the third round after getting dropped with a stiff left hook and punches, resulting in the first professional loss of his MMA career.

Silvério faced Shane Campbell at UFC Fight Night 74 on August 23, 2015. He lost the fight by unanimous decision and was subsequently released from the promotion.

=== Absolute Championship Akhmat ===
Elias made his ACA debut on January 26, 2019 at ACA 91: Agujev vs. Silvério against Arbi Agujev. He won the fight via unanimous decision.

He next faced former Bellator MMA alumni Fernando Gonzalez at ACA 96: Goncharov vs. Johnson. He won the fight via unanimous decision.

Elias faced Aslambek Saidov at ACA 101: Strus vs. Nemchinov on November 15, 2019. He won the fight via unanimous decision.

Elias's fourth fight in the promotion came against Gadzhimurad Khiramagomedov at ACA 113: Kerefov vs. Gadzhiev 2 on November 6, 2020. He lost the fight via unanimous decision.

Silvério faced Former ACA Lightweight champion Ali Bagov at ACA 117: Bagov vs. Silvério on February 12, 2021. He lost the fight via unanimous decision.

Silvério faced Georgiy Kichigin on May 28, 2021 at ACA 123: Koshkin vs. Butenko. He lost the bout via split decision.

Silvério faced Altynbek Mamashov on October 4, 2021 at ACA 130: Dudaev vs. Praia. He lost the bout via TKO in the second round.

Silvério faced Tilek Mashrapov on May 21, 2022 at ACA 139, losing the bout via split decision.

Silvério faced Chersi Dudaev on November 3, 2023 at ACA 165: Dakaev vs. Batista, losing the bout via unanimous decision.

Silvério faced Ruslan Kolodko on March 29, 2024 at ACA 173: Frolov vs. Yankovsky, winning the bout via unanimous decision.

== Championships and accomplishments ==
- Jungle Fight
  - Jungle Fight Welterweight Championship (One time)
- Thunder Fight
  - Thunder Fight Welterweight Champion (one time)

== Mixed martial arts record ==
Professional record breakdown
36 matches	22 wins	13 losses
By knockout	4	2
By submission	3	1
By decision	15	10
Draws	1	

Res.	Record	Opponent	Method	Event	Date	Round	Time	Location	Notes
Loss	22–13–1	Khalid Satuev	Decision (unanimous)	ACA 205	July 17, 2026	3	5:00	Almaty, Kazakhstan	
Win	22–12–1	Evgeny Galochkin	Decision (unanimous)	ACA 202	April 12, 2026	3	5:00	Saint Petersburg, Russia	
Loss	21–12–1	Andrey Koshkin	Decision (unanimous)	ACA 191	September 5, 2025	3	5:00	Krasnodar, Russia	
Win	21–11–1	Viktor Azatyan	Submission (rear-naked choke)	ACA 185	April 11, 2025	3	2:37	Minsk, Belarus	
Loss	20–11–1	Alexey Shurkevich	Decision (unanimous)	ACA 181	November 2, 2024	3	5:00	Saint Petersburg, Russia	
Win	20–10–1	Ruslan Kolodko	Decision (unanimous)	ACA 173	March 29, 2024	3	5:00	Minsk, Belarus	
Loss	19–10–1	Chersi Dudaev	Decision (unanimous)	ACA 165	November 3, 2023	3	5:00	Saint Petersburg, Russia	
Win	19–9–1	Mikhail Doroshenko	Submission (rear-naked choke)	ACA 159	June 16, 2023	1	3:36	Sochi, Russia	
Win	18–9–1	Elder Amorim	Decision (unanimous)	Spartacus Fight Event 33	March 4, 2023	3	5:00	São Paulo, Brazil	
Loss	17–9–1	Tilek Mashrapov	Decision (split)	ACA 139	May 21, 2022	3	5:00	Moscow, Russia	
Loss	17–8–1	Altynbek Mamashov	TKO (punches)	ACA 130	October 4, 2021	2	1:52	Grozny, Russia	
Loss	17–7–1	Georgiy Kichigin	Decision (split)	ACA 123	May 28, 2021	3	5:00	Moscow, Russia	
Loss	17–6–1	Ali Bagov	Decision (unanimous)	ACA 117	February 12, 2021	3	5:00	Sochi, Russia	
Loss	17–5–1	Gadzhimurad Khiramagomedov	Decision (unanimous)	ACA 113	November 6, 2020	3	5:00	Moscow, Russia	
Win	17–4–1	Aslambek Saidov	Decision (unanimous)	ACA 101	November 15, 2019	3	5:00	Warsaw, Poland	
Win	16–4–1	Fernando Gonzalez	Decision (unanimous)	ACA 96	June 8, 2019	3	5:00	Łódź, Poland	
Win	15–4–1	Arbi Agujev	Decision (unanimous)	ACA 91	January 26, 2019	3	5:00	Grozny, Russia	
Loss	14–4–1	Nikolay Aleksakhin	Decision (unanimous)	RCC 3	July 9, 2018	3	5:00	Yekaterinburg, Russia	
Win	14–3–1	Saygid Izagakhmaev	Decision (unanimous)	Fight Nights Global 87	May 19, 2018	3	5:00	Rostov-on-Don, Russia	
Draw	13–3–1	Goyti Dazaev	Draw (split)	WFCA 43	October 4, 2017	3	5:00	Grozny, Russia	
Win	13–3	Cleber Souza	Decision (unanimous)	Hugs Combat 2: Fight Night	October 8, 2016	3	5:00	Barueri, Brazil	
Loss	12–3	Washington Nunes da Silva	Submission (rear-naked choke)	Thunder Fight 8	August 5, 2016	2	2:15	São Paulo, Brazil	Lost the TF Welterweight Championship.
Win	12–2	Gilberto Pereira Sousa	TKO (punches)	Thunder Fight 6	April 2, 2016	1	3:35	São Paulo, Brazil	Return to Welterweight. Won the vacant TF Welterweight Championship.
Loss	11–2	Shane Campbell	Decision (unanimous)	UFC Fight Night: Holloway vs. Oliveira	August 23, 2015	3	5:00	Saskatoon, Saskatchewan, Canada	
Loss	11–1	Rashid Magomedov	TKO (punches)	UFC Fight Night: Machida vs. Dollaway	December 20, 2014	3	4:57	Barueri, Brazil	
Win	11–0	Ernest Chavez	Submission (rear-naked choke)	The Ultimate Fighter Brazil 3 Finale: Miocic vs. Maldonado	May 31, 2014	3	4:21	São Paulo, Brazil	
Win	10–0	Isaac Vallie-Flagg	Decision (unanimous)	UFC Fight Night: Rockhold vs. Philippou	January 15, 2014	3	5:00	Duluth, Georgia, United States	Lightweight debut.
Win	9–0	João Zeferino	Decision (unanimous)	UFC Fight Night: Teixeira vs. Bader	September 4, 2013	3	5:00	Belo Horizonte, Brazil	
Win	8–0	Júnior Orgulho	Decision (split)	Jungle Fight 52	May 4, 2013	3	5:00	Belém, Brazil	Won the vacant Jungle Fight Welterweight Championship.
Win	7–0	Pat DeFranco	KO (knee and punches)	Ring of Combat 43	January 24, 2013	1	0:27	Atlantic City, New Jersey, United States	Catchweight (160 lbs) bout.
Win	6–0	Júlio Rafael Rodrigues	TKO (punches)	Jungle Fight 46	December 13, 2012	1	4:13	São Paulo, Brazil	
Win	5–0	Douglas Bertazini	KO (punches)	Jungle Fight 43	September 29, 2012	1	1:21	São Paulo, Brazil	
Win	4–0	Giovanni Almeida	TKO (punches)	Jungle Fight 42	August 18, 2012	2	3:36	São Paulo, Brazil	
Win	3–0	Gilmar Dutra Lima	Decision (unanimous)	Real Fight 8	December 10, 2011	3	5:00	São Paulo, Brazil	
Win	2–0	Diego Henrique da Silva	Decision (unanimous)	Spartans Fighters	November 26, 2011	3	5:00	São Paulo, Brazil	
Win	1–0	Bruno Tavares	Decision (unanimous)	Fight Show: MMA 1	September 17, 2011	3	5:00	São Paulo, Brazil	Welterweight debut.

== See also ==
- List of current ACA fighters
- List of male mixed martial artists
