= Carlos Felipe =

Brazilian mixed martial arts fighter

- Born: January 12, 1995 (age 31); Feira de Santana, Brazil
- Nickname: Boi
- Height: 6 ft 0 in (1.83 m)
- Weight: 264 lb (120 kg; 18 st 12 lb)
- Division: Heavyweight; Light Heavyweight
- Reach: 75 in (191 cm)
- Stance: Orthodox
- Fighting out of: Feira de Santana, Bahia, Brazil
- Team: LIFE MMA
- Years active: 2014–present

Mixed martial arts record
- Total: 20
- Wins: 13
- By knockout: 6
- By decision: 7
- Losses: 7
- By submission: 1
- By decision: 6

Other information
- Mixed martial arts record from Sherdog

Carlos Felipe (born January 12, 1995) is a Brazilian mixed martial artist who competes in the Heavyweight division of Absolute Championship Akhmat (ACA). A professional since 2014, he most notably fought for the Ultimate Fighting Championship (UFC). He is ranked #9 in the ACA Heavyweight rankings.

== Background ==
Born in Feira de Santana, Bahia in 1995, Carlos Felipe was bullied throughout his childhood for being overweight. At age 14, Felipe weighed 346 pounds. Felipe was morbidly obese and his family tried everything, but nothing seemed to help him lose weight. After trying many different ways to lose weight, various diets and supplements, Felipe says boxing finally helped him drop from 346 pounds to 275 in just 12 months. He gained so much more confidence that he even began running to the local gym every day, training, then running back home once finished.

== Mixed martial arts career ==
=== Early career ===
Starting his professional career in 2014, Felipe fought for various Brazilian regional promotions, amassing an undefeated 8–0 record, winning 6 out of 8 by first round KO.

=== Ultimate Fighting Championship ===
After signing with the UFC, on September 19, Felipe was flagged for a potential USADA violation stemming from an out-of-competition sample collected July 29. Therefore, he was pulled from his UFC debut against Christian Colombo at UFC Fight Night: Brunson vs. Machida. On October 20, it was announced that Felipe accepted a two-year suspension retroactive to the date of his provisional suspension. He tested positive for metabolites of stanozolol, 16β-hydroxy-stanozolol and 3’-hydroxy-stanozolol. He was eligible to return September 18, 2019.

After being released after his positive test, Felipe was resigned to the UFC on July 20, 2019.

Felipe was expected to make his UFC debut against Serghei Spivac on May 9, 2020, at then UFC 250. However, on April 9, Dana White, the president of UFC announced that this event was postponed to a future date Eventually the bout was scheduled on July 19, 2020, at UFC Fight Night 172. He lost the fight via majority decision.

Felipe faced Yorgan de Castro, as a replacement for Ben Sosoli, on October 4, 2020, at UFC on ESPN: Holm vs. Aldana. He won the fight via unanimous decision.

Felipe faced Justin Tafa on January 16, 2021, at UFC Fight Night: Holloway vs. Kattar. He won the bout via split decision. 16 out of 20 media scores gave it to Tafa.

As the first bout of his new, four-fight contract Felipe faced Jake Collier on June 12, 2021, at UFC 263. He won the fight by split decision.

Felipe faced former UFC Heavyweight Champion Andrei Arlovski on October 16, 2021, at UFC Fight Night 195. He lost the fight via unanimous decision.

On January 18, 2022, it was announced that Felipe was given a 18-month suspension and 15 percent fine of his fight purse after tested positive for the anabolic agent Boldenone and its metabolites on Oct. 16 in relation to his decision loss to Andrei Arlovski at UFC Vegas 40. He was fined $4,200 of his purse and $489 in prosecution fees. His suspension is retroactive to the night of his failed test, meaning Felipe was cleared to resume competing on April 16, 2023.

Following the second doping violation, Felipe was released by the UFC.

=== Absolute Championship Akhmat ===
Felipe made his ACA debut on April 28, 2023 at ACA 156, defeating Yuriy Fedorov by the way of split decision.

Felipe faced Salimgerey Rasulov at ACA 164 on October 4, 2023, losing the bout via uanimous decision. At weigh-ins, Rasulov missed weight coming in at 272.3 lbs, 6.3 pounds over the Heavyweight non-title limit. Due to this Rasulov was fined a 50% of his purse which went to Felipe.

Felipe faced Tony Johnson Jr. on March 29, 2024 at ACA 173: Frolov vs. Yankovsky, losing the bout via split decision.

== Mixed martial arts record ==
Professional record breakdown
20 matches	13 wins	7 losses
By knockout	6	0
By submission	0	1
By decision	7	6

Res.	Record	Opponent	Method	Event	Date	Round	Time	Location	Notes
Loss	13–7	Anton Vyazigin	Decision (unanimous)	ACA 200	February 6, 2026	3	5:00	Moscow, Russia	
Win	13–6	Mukhamad Vakhaev	Decision (unanimous)	ACA 189	July 11, 2025	3	5:00	Grozny, Russia	
Loss	12–6	Zumso Zuraev	Submission (arm-triangle choke)	ACA 187	June 6, 2025	2	4:17	Moscow, Russia	
Loss	12–5	Kirill Kornilov	Decision (unanimous)	ACA 181	November 2, 2024	3	5:00	Saint Petersburg, Russia	
Loss	12–4	Tony Johnson	Decision (split)	ACA 173	March 29, 2024	3	5:00	Minsk, Belarus	
Loss	12–3	Salimgerey Rasulov	Decision (unanimous)	ACA 164	October 4, 2023	3	5:00	Grozny, Russia	Catchweight (272.3 lb) bout; Rasulov missed weight.
Win	12–2	Yuriy Fedorov	Decision (split)	ACA 156	April 28, 2023	3	5:00	Moscow, Russia	
Loss	11–2	Andrei Arlovski	Decision (unanimous)	UFC Fight Night: Ladd vs. Dumont	October 16, 2021	3	5:00	Las Vegas, Nevada, United States	Felipe tested positive for Boldenone.
Win	11–1	Jake Collier	Decision (split)	UFC 263	June 12, 2021	3	5:00	Glendale, Arizona, United States	
Win	10–1	Justin Tafa	Decision (split)	UFC on ABC: Holloway vs. Kattar	January 16, 2021	3	5:00	Abu Dhabi, United Arab Emirates	
Win	9–1	Yorgan de Castro	Decision (unanimous)	UFC on ESPN: Holm vs. Aldana	October 4, 2020	3	5:00	Abu Dhabi, United Arab Emirates	
Loss	8–1	Serghei Spivac	Decision (majority)	UFC Fight Night: Figueiredo vs. Benavidez 2	July 19, 2020	3	5:00	Abu Dhabi, United Arab Emirates	
Win	8–0	Francisco Sandro da Silva Bezerra	TKO (punches and elbows)	Qualify Combat 2	May 20, 2017	1	4:07	Salvador, Brazil	
Win	7–0	Paulo Cesar Almeida	TKO (punches)	Fight On 4	April 1, 2017	1	0:41	Salvador, Brazil	
Win	6–0	Wagner Maia	Decision (unanimous)	Shooto Brazil 68	December 18, 2016	3	5:00	Brasília, Brazil	
Win	5–0	Pedro Mendes	TKO (punches)	The King of Arena Fight 3	August 27, 2016	1	1:48	Alagoinhas, Brazil	
Win	4–0	Andre Miranda	Decision (unanimous)	Fight On 3	July 30, 2016	3	5:00	Salvador, Brazil	Return to Heavyweight.
Win	3–0	Alex Ardson	TKO (rib injury)	Circuito MNA de MMA 2	April 9, 2016	1	5:00	Seabra, Brazil	Light Heavyweight debut.
Win	2–0	Fernando Batista	TKO	Full House: Battle Home 9	March 21, 2015	1	3:37	Belo Horizonte, Brazil	
Win	1–0	Ronilson Santos	TKO (punches)	Velame Fight Combat 3	November 29, 2014	1	2:20	Feira de Santana, Brazil	Heavyweight debut.

== See also ==
- List of current ACA fighters
- List of male mixed martial artists
