= Chris Honeycutt =

American mixed martial arts fighter

- Born: July 25, 1988 (age 38); Brook Park, Ohio, United States
- Other names: The Cutt
- Height: 5 ft 10 in (1.78 m)
- Weight: 185.5 lb (84.1 kg; 13.25 st)
- Division: Middleweight (2016–present); Welterweight (2014–2016)
- Reach: 73 in (185 cm)
- Stance: Orthodox
- Fighting out of: Fresno, California, United States
- Team: Gym-O
- Rank: NCAA Division I Wrestling
- Years active: 2013–present

Mixed martial arts record
- Total: 27
- Wins: 16
- By knockout: 5
- By submission: 1
- By decision: 10
- Losses: 10
- By knockout: 4
- By submission: 1
- By decision: 5
- No contests: 1

Other information
- University: Edinboro University
- Mixed martial arts record from Sherdog

Chris Honeycutt (born July 25, 1988) is an American mixed martial artist who competes in the Middleweight division of the Absolute Championship Akhmat (ACA).

== Background ==
Born in Brook Park, Ohio, Honeycutt began wrestling at the age of four. Honeycutt attended North Andover High School in Massachusetts for two years before moving and transferring schools to St. Edward High School in Lakewood, Ohio, being coached by Greg Urbas. At North Andover, Honeycutt finished second in the state tournament and finished the season with a record of 32–1 with the loss coming in the state final. As a sophomore, Honeycutt won the Massachusetts state championship. At St. Edward's, Honeycutt placed third in the state tournament and then went undefeated and won the state championship again for his senior season. Honeycutt finished with an overall high school record of 154-10 and was also a member of the 2006 Junior National team. Honeycutt continued his wrestling career at Edinboro University where he was a two-time NCAA Division I All-American. A fan of mixed martial arts, Honeycutt soon began his career after college. Honeycutt also had brief training in boxing as well as Tae Kwon Do before embarking on a career in MMA.

== Mixed martial arts career ==
=== Early career: Up and Comers Unlimited ===
Honeycutt made his professional MMA debut on January 26, 2013, defeating Jesse Torres via first-round TKO in the Up and Comers Unlimited promotion.

After another first-round stoppage win, Honeycutt faced Manny Murillo for the vacant UPC middleweight championship at UPC Unlimited: Up & Comers 16 on July 20, 2013. He won the fight via unanimous decision after five rounds to become the UPC middleweight champion.

Honeycutt successfully defended his title once, defeating Jake Gallagher via TKO due to punches in the first round at UPC Unlimited: Up & Comers 18 on January 4, 2014.

=== Battlegrounds MMA ===
Honeycutt was expected to compete in the Battlegrounds MMA single night 8-man tournament on October 3, 2014. However, in September it was announced that him, along with Dennis Hallman, were removed from the welterweight bracket and replaced by Jesse Taylor and Joe Ray.

=== Bellator MMA ===
==== Welterweight ====
Honeycutt made his welterweight and Bellator debut at Bellator 125 against Ultimate Fighter 12 contestant Aaron Wilkinson on September 19, 2014. Honeycutt won the fight via TKO in the second round.

Honeycutt faced Clayton MacFarlane at Bellator 133 on February 13, 2015. He won the fight via TKO in the third round.

In his third fight for the promotion, Honeycutt faced Paul Bradley at Bellator 140 on July 17, 2015. The fight ended midway through the second round after an accidental clash of heads between the two fighters, resulting in a cut on Bradley that the doctor deemed too bad to allow the fighter to continue. The official result was a No Contest. A rematch with Bradley was held on January 29, 2016, at Bellator 148. Despite again being the betting favorite, Honeycutt lost the bout via TKO early in the first round, resulting in the first loss of his MMA career.

After his first loss, Honeycutt returned to face Matt Secor at Bellator 153 on April 22, 2016. He won the fight via unanimous decision.

==== Return to middleweight ====
Honeycutt returned to the middleweight division and faced Mikkel Parlo at Bellator 156 on June 17, 2016. Honeycutt won the fight via unanimous decision.

Honeycutt faced Ben Reiter at Bellator 166 on December 2, 2016. He won the fight via unanimous decision.

Honeycutt faced Kevin Casey at Bellator 182 on August 25, 2017. He won the fight via TKO in the second round.

Honeycutt faced Rafael Lovato Jr. at Bellator 189 on December 1, 2017. He lost the fight by unanimous decision.

Honeycutt faced Leo Leite at Bellator 202 on July 13, 2018. He won the fight via unanimous decision, getting three 30–25 score cards from the judges.

=== Absolute Championship Akhmat ===
Honeycutt faced Alexander Shlemenko at Eastern Economic Forum: Roscongress Vladivostok Combat Night on September 15, 2019. He won the fight via unanimous decision.

Honeycutt faced Azamat Bekoev on April 23, 2021, at ACA 122. He lost the bout via rear-naked choke in the second round.

Honeycutt faced Arbi Agujev on September 11, 2021, at ACA 128. He won the bout via unanimous decision.

Honeycutt faced Nikola Dipchikov at November 18, 2021 at ACA 132. He lost the bout after getting knocked out via elbows from the bottom.

Honeycutt faced Vasily Kurochkin on March 9, 2023 at ACA 153, winning the bout via unanimous decision.

Honeycutt faced Abdul-Rakhman Dzhanaev in the Quarter-final of the 2023 ACA Middleweight Grand Prix on August 11, 2023 at ACA 161, losing the bout via TKO stoppage in the first round.

Honeycutt faced former champion Salamu Abdurakhmanov on November 24, 2023 at ACA 166, losing the bout via unanimous decision.

Honeycutt faced Mikhail Dolgov on April 19, 2024 at ACA 174, losing via unanimous decision.

== Championships and accomplishments ==
=== Mixed martial arts ===
- Up and Comers Unlimited
  - UPC Middleweight Championship (one time)
  - One successful title defense

== Mixed martial arts record ==
Professional record breakdown
27 matches	16 wins	10 losses
By knockout	5	4
By submission	1	1
By decision	10	5
No contests	1	

Res.	Record	Opponent	Method	Event	Date	Round	Time	Location	Notes
Loss	16–10 (1)	Altynbek Mamashov	TKO (knee and punches)	ACA 199	January 16, 2026	2	0:29	Krasnodar, Russia	
Loss	16–9 (1)	Dauren Ermekov	Decision (split)	ACA 192	September 14, 2025	3	5:00	Almaty, Kazakhstan	
Win	16–8 (1)	Shamil Yamilov	Decision (unanimous)	ACA 187	June 6, 2025	3	5:00	Moscow, Russia	
Win	15–8 (1)	Vladimir Vasilyev	Decision (unanimous)	ACA 181	November 2, 2024	3	5:00	Saint Petersburg, Russia	
Loss	14–8 (1)	Mikhail Dolgov	Decision (unanimous)	ACA 174	April 19, 2024	3	5:00	Saint Petersburg, Russia	
Loss	14–7 (1)	Salamu Abdurakhmanov	Decision (unanimous)	ACA 166	November 24, 2023	3	5:00	Saint Petersburg, Russia	
Loss	14–6 (1)	Abdul-Rakhman Dzhanaev	TKO (punches)	ACA 161	August 11, 2023	1	2:04	Moscow, Russia	2023 ACA Middleweight Grand Prix Quarterfinal.
Win	14–5 (1)	Vasily Kurochkin	Decision (unanimous)	ACA 153	March 9, 2023	3	5:00	Moscow, Russia	
Loss	13–5 (1)	Nikola Dipchikov	KO (elbows)	ACA 132	November 18, 2021	1	1:31	Minsk, Belarus	
Win	13–4 (1)	Arbi Agujev	Decision (unanimous)	ACA 128	September 11, 2021	3	5:00	Minsk, Belarus	
Loss	12–4 (1)	Azamat Bekoev	Submission (rear-naked choke)	ACA 122	April 23, 2021	2	4:33	Minsk, Belarus	
Win	12–3 (1)	Alexander Shlemenko	Decision (unanimous)	Eastern Economic Forum: Roscongress Vladivostok Combat Night	September 5, 2019	5	5:00	Vladivostok, Russia	
Loss	11–3 (1)	Costello van Steenis	Decision (split)	Bellator 210	November 30, 2018	3	5:00	Thackerville, Oklahoma, United States	
Win	11–2 (1)	Leo Leite	Decision (unanimous)	Bellator 202	July 13, 2018	3	5:00	Thackerville, Oklahoma, United States	
Loss	10–2 (1)	Rafael Lovato Jr.	Decision (unanimous)	Bellator 189	December 1, 2017	3	5:00	Thackerville, Oklahoma, United States	
Win	10–1 (1)	Kevin Casey	TKO (punches)	Bellator 182	August 25, 2017	2	2:06	Verona, New York, United States	
Win	9–1 (1)	Ben Reiter	Decision (unanimous)	Bellator 166	December 2, 2016	3	5:00	Thackerville, Oklahoma, United States	Catchweight (195 lb) bout.
Win	8–1 (1)	Mikkel Parlo	Decision (unanimous)	Bellator 156	June 17, 2016	3	5:00	Fresno, California, United States	Return to Middleweight.
Win	7–1 (1)	Matt Secor	Decision (unanimous)	Bellator 153	April 22, 2016	3	5:00	Uncasville, Connecticut, United States	
Loss	6–1 (1)	Paul Bradley	TKO (punches)	Bellator 148	January 29, 2016	1	0:40	Fresno, California, United States	
NC	6–0 (1)	Paul Bradley	NC (accidental clash of heads)	Bellator 140	July 17, 2015	2	2:47	Uncasville, Connecticut, United States	Accidental clash of heads rendered Bradley unable to continue.
Win	6–0	Clayton MacFarlane	TKO (punches to the body)	Bellator 133	February 13, 2015	3	4:16	Fresno, California, United States	
Win	5–0	Aaron Wilkinson	TKO (punches)	Bellator 125	September 19, 2014	2	4:45	Fresno, California, United States	Welterweight debut.
Win	4–0	Jake Gallagher	TKO (punches)	UPC Unlimited: Up & Comers 18	January 4, 2014	1	2:11	Rancho Mirage, California, United States	Defended the UPC Middleweight Championship.
Win	3–0	Manny Murillo	Decision (unanimous)	UPC Unlimited: Up & Comers 16	July 20, 2013	5	5:00	Rancho Mirage, California, United States	Won the vacant UPC Middleweight Championship.
Win	2–0	Richard Blake	Submission (rear-naked choke)	UPC Unlimited: Up & Comers 15	May 11, 2013	1	2:20	Fresno, California, United States	
Win	1–0	Jesse Torres	TKO (punches)	UPC Unlimited: Up & Comers 14: The Experience	January 26, 2013	1	1:16	Palm Springs, California, United States	Middleweight debut.
