= High Court of Justice of Extremadura =

Highest judicial power of Extremadura (Spain)

- Tribunal Superior de Justicia de Extremadura
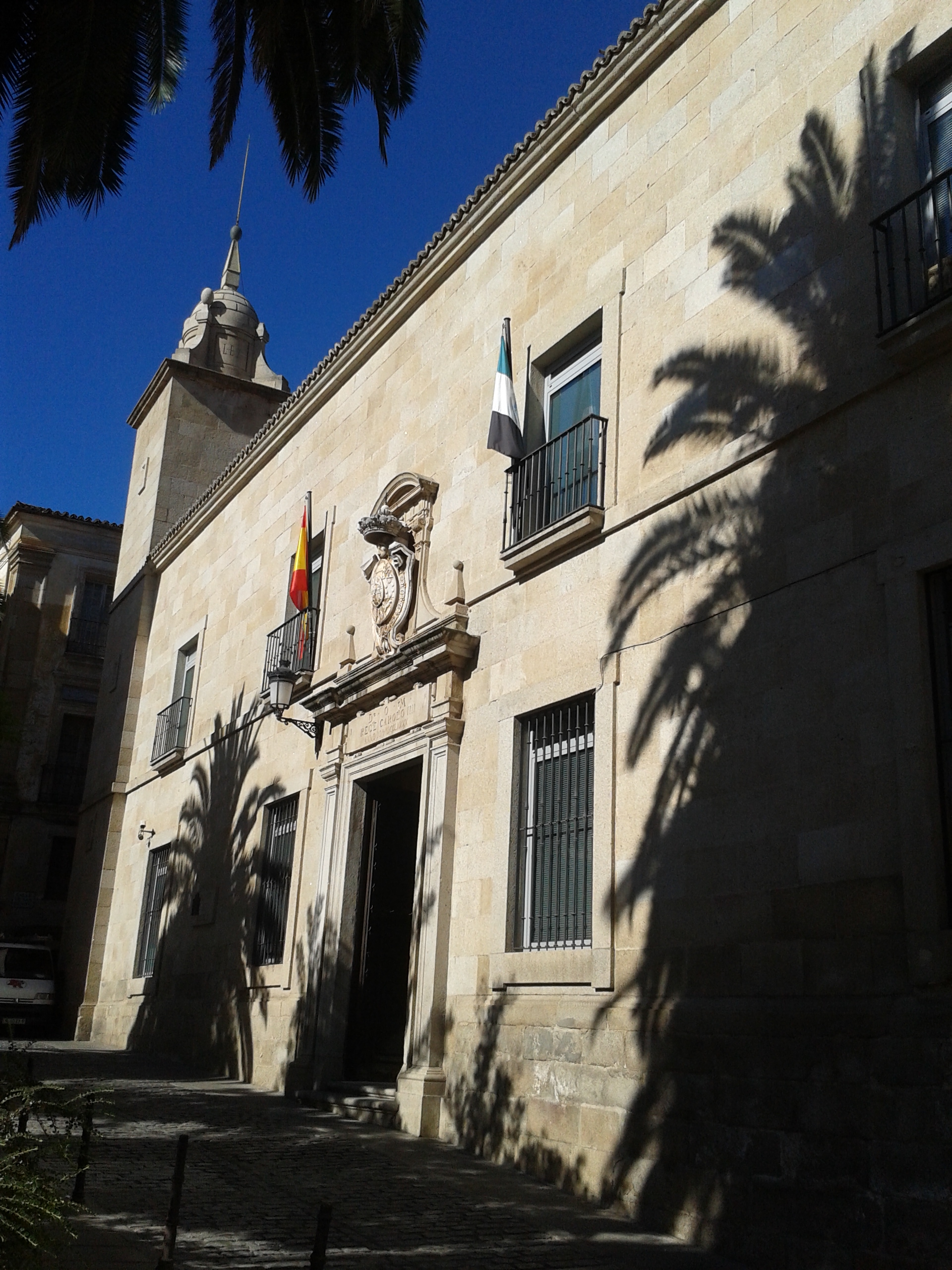
- Real Audiencia de Extremadura, seat of the TSJEx
- Established: 1989
- Jurisdiction: Extremadura
- Location: Plaza de la Audiencia, Cáceres
- Composition method: Partisan election
- Authorised by: Ley Orgánica del Poder Judicial
- Appeals to: Supreme Court; National Court (In some administrative law cases)
- Website: www.poderjudicial.es

President of the High Court of Justice of Extremadura
- Currently: María Félix Tena
- Since: 28 November 2019

The High Court of Justice of Extremadura (Spanish: Tribunal Superior de Justicia de Extremadura) is the highest body and last judicial instance of the Spanish judiciary in Extremadura. Unlike the Assembly of Extremadura (legislative branch) or the Government of Extremadura (executive branch), the TSJEx is not a part of the Junta de Extremadura, the autonomous system of self-government of the community, although the Extremaduran government has some powers over it, especially in material resources.

The TSJEx regulates the functions of the judges and looks over the different provincial courts. The TSJEx is the final appellate court in Extremaduran territory, notwithstanding the right of a citizen to appeal to the Spanish Supreme Court and/or the European Court of Justice.

The TSJEx was created on 23 May 1989 with the Organic Law of Judicial Authority (Spanish: Ley Orgánica del Poder Judicial).

== History ==
By the Pragmatic Sanction of 30 May 1790, the Royal Audience of Extremadura was created in the city of Cáceres, for whose headquarters the Hospital de la Piedad built in the 17th century was reformed. From 1834 it was renamed the Territorial Court of Extremadura, until the creation in 1989 of the Superior Court of Justice.

== Composition ==
=== Organization ===
The High Court of Justice of consists of three courts, although a fourth, for Minors, has been proposed.

- Civil and Penal (Sala Civil i Penal): Five magistrates, including the President of the Tribunal.
- Contentious-Administrative (Sala Contenciosa-Administrativa): Fourteen magistrates, distributed in four sections.
- Social (Sala Social): Sixteen magistrates, distributed in four sections.

=== President ===
==== Appointment process ====
Candidates need to obtain a three-fifths (13) supermajority of the 21 votes of the General Council of Judicial Authority (Spanish: Consejo General del Poder Judicial).

== See also ==
- Separation of Powers
- High courts of justice (Spain)
- Statute of Autonomy of Extremadura of 1983
