= Wagner Prado =

Brazilian mixed martial artist

- Born: 30 December 1987 (age 38); Campinas, Brazil
- Other names: Caldeirão
- Height: 6 ft 0 in (1.83 m)
- Weight: 205 lb (93 kg; 14.6 st)
- Division: Heavyweight; Light Heavyweight
- Reach: 74 in (188 cm)
- Fighting out of: Rio de Janeiro, Brazil
- Team: Team Nogueira / Retz
- Rank: Purple belt in Brazilian Jiu-Jitsu
- Years active: 2009–present

Mixed martial arts record
- Total: 28
- Wins: 18
- By knockout: 16
- By decision: 2
- Losses: 8
- By knockout: 2
- By submission: 3
- By decision: 3
- Draws: 1
- No contests: 1

Other information
- Mixed martial arts record from Sherdog

Wagner Prado (born December 30, 1987) is a Brazilian mixed martial artist currently competing in the light heavyweight division of Absolute Championship Akhmat (ACA). A professional competitor since 2009, he has formerly competed for the UFC and KSW.

== Biography ==
=== Early life and MMA career ===
Prado started practicing Muay Thai at 19 years old and made his professional MMA debut in October 2009. In the same year, he participated in the Brazilian television program Caldeirão do Huck of Rede Globo where he restored his Ford Maverick 1975 and earned his nickname. After his TV appearance, he joined Team Nogueira and achieved an undefeated record of 8-0, with 7 of his wins coming by way of knockout.

=== Ultimate Fighting Championship ===
Prado made his UFC debut against Phil Davis on August 4, 2012, at UFC on FOX 4, replacing an injured Chad Griggs. An eye poke by Davis rendered Prado unable to continue at 1:28 of round 1, and the official result was a No Contest.

The rematch with Davis, briefly linked to UFC on FX 5, took place on October 13, 2012, at UFC 153. Prado received the first loss of his professional career to Davis in the second round via submission due to an anaconda choke.

Prado was expected to face Roger Hollett on January 19, 2013, at UFC on FX 7. However, Hollett was forced out of the bout with a torn bicep and was replaced by promotional newcomer Ildemar Alcântara. Prado lost via submission (kneebar) in the second round, and was subsequently released from the promotion.

=== Absolute Championship Berkut ===
After going 8–3–1 since his UFC release, including a 2–0 stint in KSW, Prado signed with ACA, debuting against Elkhan Musaev at ACA 133 on December 4, 2021. He lost the bout via unanimous decision.

Prado faced Grigor Matevosyan on July 22, 2022, at ACA 141. He lost the bout via unanimous decision.

Prado won his first bout with the promotion on April 28, 2023, at ACA 156, defeating Elmar Gasanov in the second round, knocking him out.

Prado faced Faridun Odilov in the Quarter-final of the 2023 ACA Light Heavyweight Grand Prix on August 11, 2023, at ACA 161, losing the bout via scarf hold submission in the second round.

Prado rebounded against Alexey Efremov on May 17, 2024, at ACA 175: Gordeev vs. Damkovskiy, knocking him out in the first round.

== Championships and accomplishments ==
- Konfrontacja Sztuk Walki
  - Knockout of the Night (One time)
- Max Fight
  - Max Fight Light Heavyweight Championship (One time)
  - One successful title defense

== Mixed martial arts record ==
Professional record breakdown
28 matches	18 wins	8 losses
By knockout	16	2
By submission	0	3
By decision	2	3
Draws	1	
No contests	1	

Res.	Record	Opponent	Method	Event	Date	Round	Time	Location	Notes
Win	18–8–1 (1)	Alexey Efremov	KO (punch)	ACA 175	May 17, 2024	1	3:52	Moscow, Russia	
Loss	17–8–1 (1)	Faridun Odilov	Submission (scarf hold)	ACA 161	August 11, 2023	2	2:46	Moscow, Russia	2023 ACA Light Heavyweight Grand Prix Quarterfinal.
Win	17–7–1 (1)	Elmar Gasanov	KO (punch)	ACA 156	April 28, 2023	2	1:02	Moscow, Russia	
Loss	16–7–1 (1)	Grigor Matevosyan	Decision (unanimous)	ACA 141	July 22, 2022	3	5:00	Sochi, Russia	
Loss	16–6–1 (1)	Elkhan Musaev	Decision (unanimous)	ACA 133	December 4, 2021	3	5:00	Saint Petersburg, Russia	
Win	16–5–1 (1)	Mikhail Ragozin	Decision (unanimous)	RCC 14	July 17, 2021	3	5:00	Yekaterinburg, Russia	Return to Light Heavyweight.
Loss	15–5–1 (1)	Kirill Kornilov	Decision (unanimous)	RCC 9	May 3, 2021	3	5:00	Yekaterinburg, Russia	
Draw	15–4–1 (1)	Kim Doo-hwan	Draw (unanimous)	Battlefield FC 2	July 27, 2019	3	5:00	Macau, SAR, China	Light Heavyweight bout.
Loss	15–4 (1)	Anton Vyazigin	TKO (punches)	RCC 6	May 4, 2019	3	3:17	Chelyabinsk, Russia	
Win	15–3 (1)	Łukasz Parobiec	KO (punch)	KSW 45	October 6, 2018	1	0:41	London, England	Heavyweight debut. Knockout of the Night.
Win	14–3 (1)	Chris Fields	TKO (punches)	KSW 44	June 9, 2018	2	2:17	Gdańsk, Poland	
Win	13–3 (1)	Armando Sixel	KO (knee)	Katana Fight: Birthday Edition	November 25, 2017	2	3:52	Colombo, Brazil	
Loss	12–3 (1)	Magomed Ankalaev	KO (punches)	WFCA 38: Grozny Battle	May 21, 2017	1	3:33	Grozny, Russia	For the AFC Light Heavyweight Championship.
Win	12–2 (1)	Aldo Silva	TKO (punches)	Max Fight 16	August 15, 2015	1	4:19	São Paulo, Brazil	Defended the Max Fight Light Heavyweight Championship.
Win	11–2 (1)	Cesar Fabiano Rodrigues	TKO (punches)	Max Fight 14	March 28, 2015	1	3:08	São Paulo, Brazil	Won the vacant Max Fight Light Heavyweight Championship.
Win	10–2 (1)	Johnny Walker	TKO (punches)	Circuito Team Nogueira Beach 1	November 29, 2014	2	3:40	Rio de Janeiro, Brazil	
Win	9–2 (1)	Rafael Monteiro	KO (punches)	Iron Fight Combat 4	September 13, 2013	2	3:50	São José dos Pinhais, Brazil	
Loss	8–2 (1)	Ildemar Alcântara	Submission (kneebar)	UFC on FX: Belfort vs. Bisping	January 19, 2013	2	2:39	São Paulo, Brazil	
Loss	8–1 (1)	Phil Davis	Submission (anaconda choke)	UFC 153	October 13, 2012	2	4:29	Rio de Janeiro, Brazil	
NC	8–0 (1)	Phil Davis	NC (accidental eye poke)	UFC on Fox: Shogun vs. Vera	August 4, 2012	1	1:28	Los Angeles, California, United States	Accidental eye poke rendered Prado unable to continue.
Win	8–0	Aldo Sultão	KO (punches)	Max Fight 13	May 13, 2012	1	0:20	São Paulo, Brazil	
Win	7–0	Wellington Rodrigues	TKO (punches)	Max Fight 8	April 16, 2011	1	4:23	Campinas, Brazil	
Win	6–0	Cleber Tavares de Moura	Decision (unanimous)	X-Fight: Rio de Janeiro	January 15, 2011	3	5:00	Rio de Janeiro, Brazil	
Win	5–0	Fernando Tressino	TKO (knees and punches)	Campinas Fight 2	November 6, 2010	1	N/A	Campinas, Brazil	
Win	4–0	Luis Eduardo da Paixao	TKO (punches)	Max Fight 7: Rally Brazil	July 24, 2010	3	1:25	Itatiba, Brazil	
Win	3–0	Alexandre Imperador	TKO (leg kick)	First Class Fight 4	June 30, 2010	1	N/A	São Paulo, Brazil	
Win	2–0	Mario Dias	KO (head kick)	Ichigeki: Brazil 2009	October 3, 2009	1	1:02	Bragança Paulista, Brazil	
Win	1–0	Fernando Tressino	KO (knees and punches)	Ichigeki: Brazil 2009	October 3, 2009	1	0:35	Bragança Paulista, Brazil	Light Heavyweight debut.
