= Prado (footballer, born 1940) =

Brazilian footballer

Personal information
- Full name: Antônio Francisco Bueno do Prado
- Date of birth: May 13, 1940
- Place of birth: Catanduva, Brazil
- Date of death: 31 August 2017 (aged 77)
- Place of death: Campinas, Brazil
- Position: Forward

Youth career
- –1960: Bragantino

Senior career*
Years	Team	Apps	(Gls)
1960	Bragantino		
1961–1967	São Paulo	244	(121)
1967–1969	Corinthians	14	(2)
1970–1971	Bangu		

International career
1965	Brazil	1	(0)
- * Club domestic league appearances and goals

Antônio Francisco Bueno do Prado (13 May 1940 – 31 August 2017), simply known as Prado, was a Brazilian professional footballer who played as forward.

== Career ==
Prado started his career at Bragantino and defended São Paulo for over 10 years, scoring 121 goals. Passed by Corinthians and ended his career at Bangu.

Defended the Brazil national football team in 1965, in the match against Hungary, when only players from São Paulo participated.

== Personal life ==
Prado survived an attempted robbery in 2001, when he was shot twice in the abdomen.

== Death ==
Died on 31 August 2017, by a melanoma.
