= 2024 in Absolute Championship Akhmat =

Mixed martial arts events

Information
- First date: January 26, 2024
- Last date: December 13, 2024

Events
- Total events: 12

Fights
- Total fights: 204
- Title fights: 9

The year 2024 is the 12th year in the history of the Absolute Championship Akhmat, a mixed martial arts promotion based in Russia. 2024 will begin with ACA 169.

== List of events ==
| No. | Event | Date | Venue | Location |
|---|---|---|---|---|
| 1 | ACA 169: Bibulatov vs. Deák | January 26, 2024 | Sports Hall Coliseum | Grozny, Russia |
| 2 | ACA 170: Goncharov vs. Vyazigin 2 | February 9, 2024 | Irina Viner-Usmanova Gymnastics Palace | Moscow, Russia |
| 3 | ACA 171: Omarov vs. Polpudnikov | February 25, 2024 | Basket-Hall Krasnodar | Krasnodar, Russia |
| 3 | ACA 172: Esengulov vs. Vagaev | March 9, 2024 | Irina Viner-Usmanova Gymnastics Palace | Moscow, Russia |
| 4 | ACA 173: Frolov vs. Yankovsky | March 29, 2024 | Falcon Club Arena | Minsk, Belarus |
| 5 | ACA 174: Borisov vs. Vitruk | April 19, 2024 | Sibur Arena | Saint Petersburg, Russia |
| 6 | ACA 175: Gordeev vs. Damkovskiy | May 17, 2024 | Irina Viner-Usmanova Gymnastics Palace | Moscow, Russia |
| 8 | ACA 176: Ramos vs. Abdulkhalikov | May 31, 2024 | Ufa Arena | Ufa, Russia |
| 7 | ACA 177: Bagov vs. Shaikhaev 2 | June 28, 2024 | Bolshoy Ice Dome | Sochi, Russia |
| 8 | ACA 178: Goncharov vs. Bogatyrev | August 10, 2024 | Irina Viner-Usmanova Gymnastics Palace | Moscow, Russia |
| 9 | ACA 179: Omarov vs Taygibov | September 8, 2024 | Basket Hall | Krasnodar, Russia |
| 10 | ACA 180: Gadzhiev vs. Gaforov | October 4, 2024 | Sport Hall Colosseum | Grozny, Russia |
| 11 | ACA 181: Matevosyan vs. Gasanov | November 2, 2024 | Sibur Arena | Saint Petersburg, Russia |
| 12 | ACA 182: Odilov vs. Ibragimov | December 13, 2024 | Irina Viner-Usmanova Gymnastics Palace | Moscow, Russia |

== Grands Prix ==
=== 2023 ACA Heavyweight Grand Prix ===
Quarter-finals
(Russia) Alikhan Vakhaev (c) | 5
(Russia) Evgeniy Goncharov | UD
(Russia) Anton Vyazigin | UD
(United States) Tony Johnson Jr. | 5
(Russia) Mukhamad Vakhaev | TKO
(Russia) Grigoriy Ponomarev | 1
(Russia) Salimgerey Rasulov | 5
(Russia) Kirill Kornilov | UD

Semi-finals
(Russia) Evgeniy Goncharov (c) | UD
(Russia) Anton Vyazigin | 5
(Russia) Adam Bogatyrev* | SUB
(Russia) Kirill Kornilov | 4

Final
(Russia) Evgeniy Goncharov (c)
(Russia) Adam Bogatyrev

*Francimar Barroso was unable to fight the day of the bout and no replacement was found.
*In semi-final, Adam Bogatyrev has replaced Mukhamad Vakhaev, who withdrew due to arm injury.

=== 2023 ACA Light Heavyweight Grand Prix ===
Quarter-finals
(Russia) Muslim Magomedov (c) | *
(Russia) Adlan Ibragimov
(Russia) Murat Gugov | 1
(Brazil) Leonardo Silva | KO
(Russia) Mikhail Mokhnatkin | UD
(Russia) Oleg Olenichev | 5
(Tajikistan) Faridun Odilov | SUB
(Brazil) Wagner Prado | 2

Semi-finals
(Russia) Adlan Ibragimov | SD
(Brazil) Leonardo Silva | 5
(Russia) Mikhail Mokhnatkin | 3
(Tajikistan) Faridun Odilov | TKO

Final
(Russia) Adlan Ibragimov
(Tajikistan) Faridun Odilov

*following a missed weigh-in (over 5kg), Muslim Magomedov was withdrawn from the grand prix and stripped of his title. Adlan Ibragimov automatically qualifies for the semi-finals.

=== 2023 ACA Middleweight Grand Prix ===
Quarter-finals
(Russia) Magomedrasul Gasanov (c) | UD
(Russia) Salamu Abdurakhmanov | 5
(Russia) Mikhail Dolgov | 5
(Russia) Ibragim Magomedov | UD
(Russia) Shamil Abdulaev | MD
(Russia) Artem Frolov | 5
(Russia) Abdul-Rakhman Dzhanaev | TKO
(United States) Chris Honeycutt | 1

Semi-finals
(Russia) Magomedrasul Gasanov (c) | TKO
(Russia) Ibragim Magomedov | 2
(Russia) Shamil Abdulaev | TKO
(Russia) Abdul-Rakhman Dzhanaev | 3

Final
(Russia) Magomedrasul Gasanov (c)
(Russia) Shamil Abdulaev

=== 2023 ACA Welterweight Grand Prix ===
Quarter-finals
(Russia) Vitaly Slipenko (c) | 5
(Russia) Ustarmagomed Gadzhidaudov | UD
(Russia) Albert Tumenov | UD
(Kyrgyzstan) Altynbek Mamashov | 5
(Kyrgyzstan) Edil Esengulov | TKO
(Brazil) Vinicius Cruz | 4
(Russia) Abubakar Vagaev | UD
(Brazil) Michel Prazeres | 5

Semi-finals
(Russia) Ustarmagomed Gadzhidaudov (c) | 5
(Russia) Albert Tumenov | KO
(Kyrgyzstan) Edil Esengulov | 5
(Russia) Abubakar Vagaev | UD

Final
(Russia) Albert Tumenov (c)
(Russia) Abubakar Vagaev

=== 2023 ACA Lightweight Grand Prix ===
Quarter-finals
(Russia) Abdul-Aziz Abdulvakhabov (c) | TKO
(Russia) Mukhamed Kokov (ic) | 2
(Brazil) Davi Ramos | 5
(Russia) Ali Abdulkhalikov | UD
(Russia) Mehdi Dakaev | 3
(Brazil) Herdeson Batista | TKO
(Russia) Ali Bagov | TKO
(Kazakhstan) Artem Reznikov | 4

Semi-finals
(Russia) Abdul-Aziz Abdulvakhabov (c)
(Russia) Ali Abdulkhalikov
(Russia) Daud Shaikhaev* | 5
(Russia) Ali Bagov | UD

Final
(Russia)
(Russia) Ali Bagov

*Bagov was originally scheduled to face Herdeson Batista, but Batista withdrew due to hand injury and was replaced by Daud Shaikhaev.

=== 2023 ACA Featherweight Grand Prix ===
Quarter-finals
(Russia) Alikhan Suleymanov (c) | 2
(Russia) Islam Omarov | TKO
(Russia) Alexey Polpudnikov | TKO
(Russia) Abdul-Rakhman Dudaev | 5
(Russia) Bibert Tumenov | TKO
(United States) Lance Palmer | 1
(Russia) Kurban Taygibov | KO
(Brazil) Luis Rafael Laurentino | 1

Semi-finals
(Russia) Islam Omarov (c) | SUB
(Russia) Alexey Polpudnikov | 2
(Russia) Bibert Tumenov
(Russia) Kurban Taygibov

Final
(Russia) Islam Omarov (c)
(Russia)

=== 2023 ACA Bantamweight Grand Prix ===
Quarter-finals
(Russia) Oleg Borisov (c) | SD
(Russia) Rustam Kerimov | 5
(Russia) Magomed Bibulatov | UD
(Georgia (country)) Vazha Tsiptauri | 5
(Russia) Makharbek Karginov | SD
(Brazil) Josiel Silva | 5
(Russia) Mehdi Baidulaev | SUB
(Brazil) Gilberto Dias | 1

Semi-finals
(Slovakia) Tomáš Deák* | 3
(Russia) Magomed Bibulatov | TKO
(Russia) Makharbek Karginov | 2
(Russia) Mehdi Baidulaev | SUB

Final
(Russia) Magomed Bibulatov
(Russia) Mehdi Baidulaev

*In semi-final, Tomáš Deák has replaced Oleg Borisov, who withdrew due to injury..

=== 2023 ACA Flyweight Grand Prix ===
Quarter-finals
(Russia) Imran Bukuev (c) | 5
(Russia) Kurban Gadzhiev | SD
(Tajikistan) Azam Gaforov | SD
(Russia) Vartan Asatryan | 5
(Russia) Rasul Albaskhanov | UD
(Kyrgyzstan) Ryskulbek Ibraimov | 5
(Russia) Azamat Kerefov | TKO
(Tajikistan) Osimkhon Rakhmonov | 3

Semi-finals
(Russia) Kurban Gadzhiev (c)
(Tajikistan) Azam Gaforov
(Russia) Rasul Albaskhanov | 4
(Russia) Azamat Pshukov* | TKO

Final
(Russia) Azamat Pshukov

*In the other semi-final, Azamat Pshukov has replaced Azamat Kerefov, who withdrew for health reasons.

== ACA 169: Bibulatov vs. Deák ==
ACA 169: Bibulatov vs. Deák
- Promotion: Absolute Championship Akhmat
- Date: January 26, 2024
- Venue: Sports Hall Coliseum
- City: Grozny, Russia

Absolute Championship Akhmat 169: Bibulatov vs. Deák was a mixed martial arts event held by Absolute Championship Akhmat on January 26, 2024 at the Sports Hall Coliseum in Grozny, Russia.

=== Background ===
An ACA Bantamweight Championship rematch between reigning champion Oleg Borisov and former champion Magomed Bibulatov was expected to headline the event. The pairing previously met at ACA 138 on March 26, 2022, where Borisov capture the title via unanimous decision. However, champion Borisov withdrew from both the fight and the grand prix due to injury and was replaced by Tomáš Deák in a non-title semi-final bout..

A semi-final bout for the 2023 ACA Flyweight Grand Prix between Azamat Kerefov and Rasul Albaskhanov was expected to serve as the co-main event. However Kerefov withdrew from the bout for health reasons and was replaced by Azamat Pshukov.

Bonus awards:

The following fighters were awarded bonuses:

- $50,000 Performance of the Night: Murad Abdulaev
- $25,000 Performance of the Night: Khusein Kushagov
- $5000 Stoppage Victory Bonuses: Magomed Bibulatov, Azamat Pshukov, Amirkhan Adaev, Albert Gukov, Dzhambulat Zelimkhanov, Akhmed Khamzaev, Imam Vitakhanov and Islam Isaev

=== Results ===
ACA 169
| Weight Class | | | | Method | Round | Time | Notes |
|---|---|---|---|---|---|---|---|
| Bantamweight 61 kg | (Russia) Magomed Bibulatov | def. | (Slovakia) Tomáš Deák | TKO (leg kick and punches) | 3 | 3:48 | 2023 ACA Bantamweight Grand Prix Semi-Final bout |
| Flyweight 57 kg | (Russia) Azamat Pshukov | def. | (Russia) Rasul Albaskhanov | TKO (punch) | 4 | 3:44 | 2023 ACA Flyweight Grand Prix Semi-Final bout |
| Bantamweight 61 kg | (Brazil) Josiel Silva | def. | (Russia) Abdul-Rakhman Dudaev | Decision (unanimous) | 3 | 5:00 | |
| Middleweight 84 kg | (Russia) Murad Abdulaev | def. | (Russia) Khusein Kushagov | Decision (split) | 3 | 5:00 | |
| Bantamweight 61 kg | (Russia) Murad Kalamov | def. | (Brazil) Daniel Oliveira | Decision (unanimous) | 3 | 5:00 | |
Preliminary Card
| Flyweight 57 kg | (Russia) Imran Bukuev | def. | (Brazil) Romero Reis | Decision (unanimous) | 3 | 5:00 | |
| Lightweight 70 kg | (Russia) Amirkhan Adaev | def. | (Brazil) Cleverson Silva | KO (punches) | 2 | 1:28 | |
| Flyweight 57 kg | (Russia) Mansur Khatuev | def. | (Tajikistan) Emomakhdi Orzuzoda | Decision (split) | 3 | 5:00 | |
| Lightweight 70 kg | (Russia) Albert Gukov | def. | (Russia) Abubakar Mestoev | Submission (rear-naked choke) | 1 | 0:40 | |
| Bantamweight 61 kg | (Russia) Dzhambulat Zelimkhanov | def. | (Brazil) Ronaldo Oliveira | TKO (punches) | 1 | 2:16 | |
| Weltereight 77 kg | (Russia) Yakub Suleymanov | def. | (Kyrgyzstan) Jakyp Tuganbaev | Decision (unanimous) | 3 | 5:00 | |
| Flyweight 57 kg | (Russia) Akhmed Khamzaev | def. | (Uzbekistan) Zokirjon Khoshimov | TKO (punches) | 2 | 2:10 | |
| Featherweight 66 kg | (Russia) Imam Vitakhanov | def. | (Brazil) Antonio Roberto | KO (punch) | 1 | 1:19 | |
| Lightweight 70 kg | (Russia) Islam Isaev | def. | (Brazil) Guilherme Doin | TKO (punches) | 2 | 1:31 | |

== ACA 170: Goncharov vs. Vyazigin 2 ==
ACA 170: Goncharov vs. Vyazigin 2
- Promotion: Absolute Championship Akhmat
- Date: February 9, 2024
- Venue: Irina Viner-Usmanova Gymnastics Palace
- City: Moscow, Russia

Absolute Championship Akhmat 170: Goncharov vs. Vyazigin 2 was a mixed martial arts event held by Absolute Championship Akhmat on February 9, 2024 at the Irina Viner-Usmanova Gymnastics Palace in Moscou, Russia.

=== Background ===
An ACA Heavyweight Championship bout between reigning champion Evgeniy Goncharov and challenger Anton Vyazigin headlined the event. The pairing previously met at RCC 8 on December 19, 2020, where Goncharov won via unanimous decision.

An ACA Flyweight Championship bout between current champion Kurban Gadzhiev and contender Azam Gaforov was expected to take place in the co-main event. However, champion Gadzhiev withdrew from both the fight and the grand prix due to injury.

Bonus awards:

The following fighters were awarded bonuses:

- $50,000 Performance of the Night: Nikola Dipchikov
- $5000 Stoppage Victory Bonuses: Shamil Abdulaev, Vladimir Vasilyev and Masud Zamonov

=== Results ===
ACA 170
| Weight Class | | | | Method | Round | Time | Notes |
|---|---|---|---|---|---|---|---|
| Heavyweight 120 kg | (Russia) Evgeniy Goncharov (c) | def. | (Russia) Anton Vyazigin | Decision (unanimous) | 5 | 5:00 | 2023 ACA Heavyweight Grand Prix Semi-Final bout for the ACA Heavyweight Championship |
| Middleweight 84 kg | (Russia) Shamil Abdulaev | def. | (Russia) Abdul-Rakhman Dzhanaev | TKO (punches) | 3 | 4:15 | 2023 ACA Middleweight Grand Prix Semi-Final bout |
| Middleweight 84 kg | (Bulgaria) Nikola Dipchikov | def. | (Russia) Vitaly Slipenko | KO (punches) | 1 | 2:22 | |
| Lightweight 70 kg | (Russia) Daud Shaikhaev | def. | (Russia) Mukhamed Kokov | Decision (unanimous) | 3 | 5:00 | |
| Lightweight 70 kg | (Russia) Abdul-Rakhman Temirov | def. | (Kyrgyzstan) Bekbolot Abdylda | Decision (unanimous) | 3 | 5:00 | |
Preliminary Card
| Bantamweight 61 kg | (Armenia) Ayk Kazaryan | def. | (Brazil) Francisco Maciel | TKO (punches) | 1 | 4:41 | |
| Featherweight 66 kg | (Tajikistan) Kafiz Sakibekov | def. | (Russia) Arsen Shibzukhov | Decision (unanimous) | 3 | 5:00 | |
| Middleweight 84 kg | (Russia) Vladimir Vasilyev | def. | (Brazil) Anderson Gonçalves | Technical Submission (ninja choke) | 3 | 4:41 | |
| Featherweight 66 kg | (Kazakhstan) Bagdos Olzhabay | def. | (Brazil) Luis Rafael Laurentino | Decision (unanimous) | 3 | 5:00 | |
| Welterweight 77 kg | (Tajikistan) Iskandar Mamadaliev | def. | (Brazil) Michel Silva | Decision (unanimous) | 3 | 5:00 | |
| Featherweight 66 kg | (Russia) Yusup-Khadzhi Zubariev | def. | (Russia) Said-Magomed Gimbatov | Decision (unanimous) | 3 | 5:00 | |
| Featherweight 66 kg | (Russia) Said-Magomed Batukaev | def. | (Uzbekistan) Avliyohon Hamidov | TKO (finger injury) | 1 | 3:29 | |
| Flyweight 57 kg | (Russia) Masud Zamonov | def. | (Belarus) Andrey Kalechits | TKO (spinning back kick) | 1 | 4:17 | |

== ACA 171: Omarov vs. Polpudnikov ==
ACA 171: Omarov vs. Polpudnikov
- Promotion: Absolute Championship Akhmat
- Date: February 25, 2024
- Venue: Basket-Hall Krasnodar
- City: Krasnodar, Russia

Absolute Championship Akhmat 171: Omarov vs. Polpudnikov was a mixed martial arts event held by Absolute Championship Akhmat on February 25, 2024 at the Basket-Hall Krasnodar in Krasnodar, Russia.

=== Background ===
An ACA Middleweight Championship bout between reigning champion Magomedrasul Gasanov and challenger Ibragim Magomedov headlined the event, while an ACA Featherweight Championship bout between current undefeated (14–0) champion Islam Omarov and challenger Alexey Polpudnikov served as the co-main event.

Bonus awards:

The following fighters were awarded bonuses:

- $50,000 Performance of the Night: Nashkho Galaev
- $25,000 Performance of the Night: John Macapá
- $5000 Stoppage Victory Bonuses: Islam Omarov, Magomedrasul Gasanov, Grigor Matevosyan, Vartan Asatryan, Muslim Magomedov, Bayzet Khatkhokhu and Lincoln Henrique

=== Results ===
ACA 171
| Weight Class | | | | Method | Round | Time | Notes |
|---|---|---|---|---|---|---|---|
| Featherweight 66 kg | (Russia) Islam Omarov (c) | def. | (Russia) Alexey Polpudnikov | Submission (rear-naked choke) | 2 | 4:21 | 2023 ACA Featherweight Grand Prix Semi-Final bout for the ACA Featherweight Championship |
| Middleweight 84 kg | (Russia) Magomedrasul Gasanov (c) | def. | (Russia) Ibragim Magomedov | TKO (punches) | 2 | 4:56 | 2023 ACA Middleweight Grand Prix Semi-Final bout for the ACA Middleweight Championship |
| Light Heavyweight 93 kg | (Russia) Grigor Matevosyan | def. | (Russia) Elkhan Musaev | TKO (punches and elbows) | 1 | 3:14 | |
| Flyweight 57 kg | (Russia) Vartan Asatryan | def. | (Brazil) Alexsandro Praia | Submission (ninja choke) | 1 | 4:26 | |
| Light Heavyweight 93 kg | (Russia) Muslim Magomedov | def. | (Brazil) Ewerton Polaquini | TKO (punches) | 3 | 2:46 | |
Preliminary Card
| Lightweight 70 kg | (Russia) Rasul Magomedov | def. | (Russia) Ramazan Kishev | Decision (unanimous) | 3 | 5:00 | |
| Bantamweight 61 kg | (Russia) Goga Shamatava | def. | (Russia) Dzhaddal Alibekov | Decision (unanimous) | 3 | 5:00 | |
| Lightweight 70 kg | (Russia) Bayzet Khatkhokhu | def. | (Russia) Alik Albogachiev | Submission (rear-naked choke) | 1 | 4:04 | |
| Light Heavyweight 93 kg | (Russia) Elmar Gasanov | def. | (Russia) Oleg Olenichev | Decision (unanimous) | 3 | 5:00 | |
| Light Heavyweight 93 kg | (Russia) Arbi Aguev | def. | (Brazil) Rodrigo Cavalheiro | Decision (unanimous) | 3 | 5:00 | |
| Featherweight 66 kg | (Russia) Nashkho Galaev | def. | (Brazil) John Macapá | Decision (split) | 3 | 5:00 | |
| Lightweight 70 kg | (Russia) Basir Saraliev | def. | (Russia) Amir Elzhurkaev | Decision (unanimous) | 3 | 5:00 | |
| Flyweight 57 kg | (Kyrgyzstan) Ryskulbek Ibraimov | def. | (Russia) Muso Vistokadamov | Decision (unanimous) | 3 | 5:00 | |
| Welterweight 77 kg | (Brazil) Lincoln Henrique | def. | (Russia) Zelimkhan Amirov | Technical Submission (arm-triangle choke) | 2 | 4:37 | |
| Bantamweight 61 kg | (Russia) Khasan Dadalov | def. | (Russia) Igor Olchonov | Decision (split) | 3 | 5:00 | |
| Bantamweight 61 kg | (Russia) Islam Yunusov | def. | (Brazil) Rodrigo Praia | Decision (unanimous) | 3 | 5:00 | |

== ACA 172: Esengulov vs. Vagaev ==
ACA 172: Esengulov vs. Vagaev
- Promotion: Absolute Championship Akhmat
- Date: March 9, 2024
- Venue: Irina Viner-Usmanova Gymnastics Palace
- City: Moscow, Russia

Absolute Championship Akhmat 172: Esengulov vs. Vagaev was a mixed martial arts event held by Absolute Championship Akhmat on March 9, 2024 at the Irina Viner-Usmanova Gymnastics Palace in Moscow, Russia.

=== Background ===
A Middleweight rematch between Magomed Ismailov and former Bellator Middleweight title challenger Anatoly Tokov was expected to headline the event.The pairing previously met at M-1 Challenge 39 on May 23, 2013, where Ismailov won via submission in the first round. However, Magomedov withdrew from the fight due to knee injury. As a results, a semi-final bout for the 2023 ACA Welterweight Grand Prix between Edil Esengulov and Abubakar Vagaev was promoted to the main event status.

Bonus awards:

The following fighters were awarded bonuses:

- $50,000 Performance of the Night: Abubakar Vagaev and Adlan Ibragimov
- $25,000 Performance of the Night: Leonardo Silva
- $5000 Stoppage Victory Bonuses: Adam Bogatyrev and Aren Akopyan

=== Results ===
ACA 172
| Weight Class | | | | Method | Round | Time | Notes |
|---|---|---|---|---|---|---|---|
| Welterweight 77 kg | (Russia) Abubakar Vagaev | def. | (Kyrgyzstan) Edil Esengulov | Decision (unanimous) | 5 | 5:00 | 2023 ACA Welterweight Grand Prix Semi-Final bout |
| Heavyweight 120 kg | (Russia) Adam Bogatyrev | def. | (Russia) Kirill Kornilov | Submission (rear-naked choke) | 4 | 3:!6 | 2023 ACA Heavyweight Grand Prix Semi-Final bout |
| Light Heavyweight 93 kg | (Russia) Adlan Ibragimov | def. | (Brazil) Leonardo Silva | Decision (split) | 5 | 5:00 | 2023 ACA Light Heavyweight Grand Prix Semi-Final bout |
| Bantamweight 61 kg | (Russia) Mehdi Baydulaev | def. | (Russia) Makharbek Karginov | Technical Submission (rear-naked choke) | 2 | 1:40 | 2023 ACA Bantamweight Grand Prix Semi-Final bout |
| Welterweight 77 kg | (Russia) Chersi Dudaev | def. | (Russia) Anatoly Boyko | Decision (unanimous) | 3 | 5:00 | |
Preliminary Card
| Welterweight 77 kg | (Russia) Uzair Abdurakov | def. | (Russia) Andrei Koshkin | Decision (split) | 3 | 5:00 | |
| Bantamweight 61 kg | (Russia) Aleksandr Podlesniy | def. | (Russia) Timur Valiev | Decision (unanimous) | 3 | 5:00 | |
| Heavyweight 120 kg | (Azerbaijan) Ruslan Medzhidov | def. | (Russia) Salimgerey Rasulov | Decision (split) | 3 | 5:00 | |
| Fkyweight 57 kg | (Russia) Aren Akopyan | def. | (Brazil) Giliarde Mota | TKO (elbow and punches) | 1 | 0:54 | |
| Lightweight 70 kg | (Russia) Ali Abdulkhalikov | def. | (Russia) Lom-Ali Nalgiev | Decision (unanimous) | 3 | 5:00 | |
| Welterweight 77 kg | (Russia) Marat Gafurov | def. | (Slovakia) Gábor Boráros | Submission (armbar) | 1 | 2:55 | |
| Bantamweight 61 kg | (Russia) Tamerlan Kulaev | def. | (Russia) Murad Kalamov | Decision (split) | 3 | 5:00 | |
| Fkyweight 57 kg | (Russia) Saygid Abdulaev | def. | (Tajikistan) Oyatullo Muminov | Decision (split) | 3 | 5:00 | |

== ACA 173: Frolov vs. Yankovsky ==
ACA 173: Frolov vs. Yankovsky
- Promotion: Absolute Championship Akhmat
- Date: March 29, 2024
- Venue: Falcon Club Arena
- City: Minsk, Belarus.

Absolute Championship Akhmat 173: Frolov vs. Yankovsky was a mixed martial arts event held by Absolute Championship Akhmat on March 29, 2024 at the Falcon Club Arena in Minsk, Belarus.

=== Background ===
A middleweight bout between Artem Frolov and Vladislav Yankovsky headlined the event.

Bonus awards:

The following fighters were awarded bonuses:

- $50,000 Performance of the Night: Tony Johnson Jr.
- $25,000 Performance of the Night: Carlos Felipe
- $5000 Stoppage Victory Bonuses: Artem Frolov, Denis Maher, Arash Sadeghi, Viktor Azatyan and Kholmurod Nurmatov

=== Results ===
ACA 173
| Weight Class | | | | Method | Round | Time | Notes |
|---|---|---|---|---|---|---|---|
| Middleweight 84 kg | (Russia) Artem Frolov | def. | (Belarus) Vladislav Yankovsky | TKO (punches) | 2 | 4:19 | |
| Heavyweight 120 kg | (United States) Tony Johnson Jr. | def. | (Brazil) Carlos Felipe | Decision (split) | 3 | 5:00 | |
| Welterweight 77 kg | (Brazil) Elias Silvério | def. | (Belarus) Ruslan Kolodko | Decision (unanimous) | 3 | 5:00 | |
| Welterweight 77 kg | (Belarus) Denis Maher | def. | (Russia) Mikhail Doroshenko | Technical Submission (rear-naked choke) | 3 | 4:09 | |
| Heavyweight 120 kg | (Iran) Arash Sadeghi | def. | (Estonia) Denis Smoldarev | TKO (elbows) | 1 | 2:45 | |
Preliminary Card
| Light Heavyweight 93 kg | (Russia) Ruslan Gabaraevv | def. | (Belarus) Sergey Starodub | Decision (unanimous) | 3 | 5:00 | |
| Bantamweight 61 kg | (Georgia (country)) Vazha Tsiptauri | def. | (Brazil) Maycon Silvan | Decision (unanimous) | 3 | 5:00 | |
| Welterweight 77 kg | (Armenia) Viktor Azatyan | def. | (Czech Republic) Vítězslav Rajnoch | TKO (corner stoppage) | 3 | 0:38 | |
| Bantamweight 61 kg | (Belarus) Vladislav Novitskiy | def. | (Iraq) Issa Salem | Decision (unanimous) | 3 | 5:00 | |
| Flyweight 57 kg | (Uzbekistan) Kholmurod Nurmatov | def. | (Armenia) Mkhitar Barseghyan | Technical Submission (rear-naked choke) | 1 | 3:38 | |

== ACA 174: Borisov vs. Vitruk ==
ACA 174: Borisov vs. Vitruk
- Promotion: Absolute Championship Akhmat
- Date: April 19, 2024
- Venue: Sibur Arena
- City: Saint Petersburg, Russia.

Absolute Championship Akhmat 174: Borisov vs. Vitruk was a mixed martial arts event held by Absolute Championship Akhmat on April 19, 2024 at the Sibur Arena in Saint Petersburg, Russia.

=== Background ===
A ACA Bantamweight Championship bout between reigning champion Oleg Borisov and former M-1 Global Bantamweight champion Pavel Vitruk headlined the event,

Bonus awards:

The following fighters were awarded bonuses:

- $50,000 Performance of the Night: Pavel Vitruk
- $5000 Stoppage Victory Bonuses: Alexander Matmuratov, Caio Bittencourt, Ivan Bogdanov, Nikita Prikhodko and Artem Dushenko

=== Results ===
ACA 174
| Weight Class | | | | Method | Round | Time | Notes |
|---|---|---|---|---|---|---|---|
| Bantamweight 61 kg | (Russia) Pavel Vitruk | def. | (Russia) Oleg Borisov (c) | KO (knee) | 4 | 4:52 | For the ACA Bantamweight Championship |
| Middleweight 84 kg | (Russia) Anatoly Tokov | def. | (Tajikistan) Sharaf Davlatmurodov | Decision (unanimous) | 3 | 5:00 | |
| Lightweight 70 kg | (Russia) Alexander Matmuratov | def. | (Brazil) Herbert Batista | TKO (front kick to the body and punches) | 1 | 3:06 | |
| Middleweight 84 kg | (Russia) Mikhail Dolgov | def. | (United States) Chris Honeycutt | Decision (unanimous) | 3 | 5:00 | |
| Featherweight 66 kg | (Brazil) Felipe Froes | def. | (Russia) Gleb Khabibulin | Decision (split) | 3 | 5:00 | |
Preliminary Card
| Light Heavyweight 93 kg | (Brazil) Caio Bittencourt | def. | (Russia) Evgeniy Erokhin | TKO (punches) | 2 | 1:58 | |
| Middleweight 84 kg | (Russia) Ivan Bogdanov | def. | (Russia) Azamat Dzhigkaev | KO (punches) | 1 | 4:35 | |
| Welterweight 77 kg | (Russia) Ivan Soloviev | def. | (Russia) Evgeniy Galochkin | Decision (unanimous) | 3 | 5:00 | |
| Welterweight 77 kg | (Kazakhstan) Georgiy Kichigin | def. | (Russia) Denis Izmodenov | Decision (unanimous) | 3 | 5:00 | |
| Welterweight 77 kg | (Russia) Alexey Shurkevich | def. | (Brazil) Renato Gomes | TKO (corner stoppage) | 2 | 5:00 | |
| Middleweight 84 kg | (Russia) Ruslan Shamilov | def. | (Brazil) Ewerton Polaquini | Decision (unanimous) | 3 | 5:00 | |
| Featherweight 66 kg | (Russia) Mikhail Egorov | def. | (Brazil) Anderson dos Santos | TKO (knees and punches) | 2 | 1:12 | |
| Bantamweight 61 kg | (Russia) Nikita Prikhodko | def. | (Uzbekistan) Zukhriddin Gafurov | Technical Submission (brado choke) | 1 | 3:52 | |
| Light Heavyweight 93 kg | (Russia) Artem Dushenko | def. | (Uzbekistan) Lazizbek Abdusalimov | TKO (punches) | 1 | 2:28 | |

== ACA 175: Gordeev vs. Damkovskiy ==
ACA 175: Gordeev vs. Damkovskiy
- Promotion: Absolute Championship Akhmat
- Date: May 17, 2024
- Venue: Irina Viner-Usmanova Gymnastics Palace
- City: Moscow, Russia.

ACA 175: Gordeev vs. Damkovskiy was a mixed martial arts event held by Absolute Championship Akhmat on May 17, 2024 at the Irina Viner-Usmanova Gymnastics Palace in Moscow, Russia.

=== Background ===
A lightweight bout between Pavel Gordeev and Artiom Damkovsky headlined the event.

A bantamweight bout between Osimkhon Rakhmonov and former Oktagon Bantamweight champion (also former AMC Fight Nights Bantamweight champion) Tomáš Deák was expected to take place at the event.

A welterweight bout between Anatoliy Boyko and Vinicius Cruz was expected to take place at the event. However Boyko withdrew from the bout for health reasons and the fight was cancelled.

Bonus awards:

The following fighters were awarded bonuses:

- $50,000 Performance of the Night:
- $25,000 Performance of the Night:
- $5000 Stoppage Victory Bonuses:

=== Results ===
ACA 175
| Weight Class | | | | Method | Round | Time | Notes |
|---|---|---|---|---|---|---|---|
| Lightweight 70 kg | (Russia) Pavel Gordeev | def. | (Belarus) Artiom Damkovsky | Decision (split) | 5 | 5:00 | |
| Lightweight 70 kg | (Russia) Alexey Polpudnikov | def. | (United States) Lance Palmer | TKO (punches) | 2 | 1:55 | |
| Bantamweight 61 kg | (Tajikistan) Osimkhon Rakhmonov | def. | (Brazil) Walter Pereira Jr. | KO (punch) | 1 | 1:47 | |
| Light Heavyweight 93 kg | (Brazil) Wagner Prado | def. | (Russia) Alexey Efremov | KO (punch) | 1 | 3:52 | |
Preliminary Card
| Bantamweight 61 kg | (Russia) Renat Ondar | def. | (Kazakhstan) Igor Zhirkov | TKO (punches) | 2 | 3:18 | |
| Flyweight 57 kg | (Russia) Anatoliy Kondratiev | def. | (Russia) Ruslan Abiltarov | Decision (split) | 3 | 5:00 | |
| Featherweight 66 kg | (Ukraine) Roman Ogulchanskiy | def. | (Georgia (country)) Levan Makashvili | Submission (arm-triangle choke) | 1 | 2:34 | |
| Welterweight 77 kg | (Russia) Adlan Bataev | def. | (Brazil) Jair Jesuino | TKO (punches) | 1 | 4:39 | |
| Heavyweight 120 kg | (Iran) Pouya Rahmani | def. | (Russia) Yuriy Fedorov | Submission (rear-naked choke) | 1 | 3:00 | |
| Welterweight 77 kg | (Russia) Yusup Umarov | def. | (Argentina) Nico Cocuccio | TKO (punches) | 2 | 2:33 | |
| Welterweight 77 kg | (Ukraine) Renat Lyatifov | def. | (Brazil) Michel Prazeres | Decision (unanimous) | 3 | 5:00 | |
| Lightweight 70 kg | (Kyrgyzstan) Ali Mashrapov | def. | (Russia) Vladimir Palchenkov | Decision (split) | 3 | 5:00 | |
| Flyweight 57 kg | (Russia) Sergey Shirkunov | def. | (Russia) Muso Vistokadamov | Submission (rear-naked choke) | 3 | 4:56 | |

== ACA 176: Ramos vs. Abdulkhalikov ==
ACA 176: Ramos vs. Abdulkhalikov
- Promotion: Absolute Championship Akhmat
- Date: May 31, 2024
- Venue: Ufa Arena
- City: Ufa, Russia.

ACA 176: Ramos vs. Abdulkhalikov was a mixed martial arts event held by Absolute Championship Akhmat on May 31, 2024 at the Ufa Arena in Ufa, Russia.

=== Background ===
Bonus awards:

The following fighters were awarded bonuses:

- $50,000 Performance of the Night:
- $25,000 Performance of the Night:
- $5000 Stoppage Victory Bonuses:

=== Results ===
ACA 176
| Weight Class | | | | Method | Round | Time | Notes |
|---|---|---|---|---|---|---|---|
| Lightweight 70 kg | (Russia) Ali Abdulkhalikov | def. | (Brazil) Davi Ramos | Decision (unanimous) | 5 | 5:00 | 2023 ACA Lightweight Grand Prix Quarterfinal. |
| Lightweight 70 kg | (Romania) Aurel Pîrtea | def. | (Russia) Vener Galiev | Decision (unanimous) | 3 | 5:00 | |
| Welterweight 77 kg | (Russia) Alexey Makhno | def. | (Italy) Cristian Brinzan | Decision (unanimous) | 3 | 5:00 | |
| Bantamweight 61 kg | (Brazil) Josiel Silva | def. | (Russia) Akhmed Musakaev | Decision (unanimous) | 3 | 5:00 | |
| Welterweight 77 kg | (Kyrgyzstan) Zhakshylyk Myrzabekov | def. | (Russia) Nikolay Aleksakhin | Decision (unanimous) | 3 | 5:00 | |
Preliminary Card
| Bantamweight 61 kg | (Russia) Goga Shamatava | def. | (Kyrgyzstan) Alimardan Abdykaarov | Decision (split) | 3 | 5:00 | |
| Flyweight 57 kg | (Russia) Aren Akopyan | def. | (Brazil) Alan Gomes | Decision (unanimous) | 3 | 5:00 | |
| Light Heavyweight 93 kg | (Russia) Artur Astakhov | def. | (Russia) Arbi Agujev | Decision (unanimous) | 3 | 5:00 | |
| Middleweight 93 kg | (Russia) Shamil Yamilov | def. | (Brazil) Anderson Gonçalves | Decision (unanimous) | 3 | 5:00 | |
| Light Heavyweight 93 kg | (Russia) Elmar Gasanov | def. | (Mexico) Jorge Gonzalez | TKO (punches) | 1 | 4:03 | |
| Lightweight 70 kg | (Russia) Ali Suleymanov | def. | (Russia) Nizamuddin Ramazanov | Submission (rear-naked choke) | 3 | 3:00 | |
| Flyweight 57 kg | (Tajikistan) Emomakhdi Orzuzoda | def. | (Russia) Vagiz Ismagilov | TKO (knee and punches) | 3 | 4:20 | |
| Flyweight 57 kg | (Russia) Ramzan Suleymanov | def. | (Brazil) Ruan Miqueias | Decision (unanimous) | 3 | 5:00 | |

== ACA 177: Bagov vs. Shaikhaev 2 ==
ACA 177: Bagov vs. Shaikhaev 2
- Promotion: Absolute Championship Akhmat
- Date: June 28, 2024
- Venue: Bolshoy Ice Dome
- City: Sochi, Russia.

ACA 177: Bagov vs. Shaikhaev 2 was a mixed martial arts event held by Absolute Championship Akhmat on June 28, 2024 at the Bolshoy Ice Dome in Sochi, Russia.

=== Background ===
In a semifinal of 2023 ACA Lightweight Grand Prix bout between former ACA Lightweight Champion (also 2015 ACB Lightweight Grand Prix winner) Ali Bagov and Herdeson Batista was expected to headline the event. However, Batista withdrew due to hand injury and was replaced by Daud Shaikhaev.

Bonus awards:

The following fighters were awarded bonuses:

- $50,000 Performance of the Night:
- $25,000 Performance of the Night:
- $5000 Stoppage Victory Bonuses:

=== Results ===
ACA 177
| Weight Class | | | | Method | Round | Time | Notes |
|---|---|---|---|---|---|---|---|
| Lightweight 70 kg | (Russia) Ali Bagov | def. | (Russia) Daud Shaikhaev | Decision (unanimous) | 5 | 5:00 | 2023 ACA Lightweight Grand Prix Semifinal. |
| Light Heavyweight 93 kg | (Russia) Muslim Magomedov | def. | (Russia) Grigor Matevosyan | Decision (unanimous) | 3 | 5:00 | |
| Middleweight 84 kg | (Russia) Artem Frolov | def. | (Russia) Salamu Abdurakhmanov | Decision (split) | 3 | 5:00 | |
| Flyweight 57 kg | (Russia) Vartan Asatryan | def. | (Kyrgyzstan) Ryskulbek Ibraimov | Decision (unanimous) | 3 | 5:00 | |
| Lightweight 70 kg | (Kazakhstan) Artem Reznikov | def. | (Russia) Mukhamed Kokov | Decision (unanimous) | 3 | 5:00 | Both fighters missed weight: Kokov (71.5 kg) and Reznikov (72.35 kg). |
Preliminary Card
| Featherweight 66 kg | (Russia) Alikhan Suleymanov | def. | (Brazil) Carlos Augusto da Silva | Decision (unanimous) | 3 | 5:00 | |
| Featherweight 66 kg | (Russia) Rustam Kerimov | def. | (Brazil) Cleverson Silva | TKO (punches) | 1 | 1:47 | Silva missed weight (66.95 kg). |
| Light Heavyweight 93 kg | (Brazil) Leonardo Silva | def. | (Russia) Vitaly Bigdash | KO (punches) | 3 | 0:53 | |
| Lightweight 70 kg | (Russia) Amirkhan Adaev | def. | (Belarus) Viktor Makarenko | Decision (unanimous) | 3 | 5:00 | |
| Featherweight 66 kg | (Brazil) Marcos Rodrigues | def. | (Belarus) Apti Bimarzaev | Decision (unanimous) | 3 | 5:00 | Rodrigues missed weight (67.2 kg). |
| Middleweight 84 kg | (Russia) Ramazan Emeev | def. | (Russia) Vladimir Vasilyev | Decision (unanimous) | 3 | 5:00 | |
| Middleweight 84 kg | (Russia) Mikhail Dolgov | def. | (Russia) Husein Kushagov | Decision (split) | 3 | 5:00 | |
| Featherweight 66 kg | (Russia) Saifulla Dzhabrailov | def. | (Russia) Islam Meshev | KO (punch) | 1 | 1:29 | |
| Flyweight 57 kg | (Russia) Astemir Nagoev | def. | (Russia) Mansur Khatuev | Decision (unanimous) | 3 | 5:00 | Khatuev missed weight (59.75 kg). |
| Light Heavyweight 93 kg | (Russia) Sulim Batalov | def. | (Russia) Oleg Olenichev | Decision (unanimous) | 3 | 5:00 | Olenichev missed weight (93.75 kg). |
| Welterweight 77 kg | (Russia) Amazasp Martirosyan | def. | (Russia) Khamzat Sakalov | Decision (unanimous) | 3 | 5:00 | |
| Featherweight 66 kg | (Russia) Yusup-Khadzhi Zubariev | def. | (Russia) Arsen Shibzukhov | KO (punches) | 1 | 2:30 | |
| Heavyweight 120 kg | (Russia) Zumso Zuraev | def. | (Iran) Arash Sadeghi | Decision (unanimous) | 3 | 5:00 | |
| Featherweight 66 kg | (Russia) Rustam Asuev | def. | (Belarus) Alexander Kovalev | Decision (split) | 3 | 5:00 | |

== ACA 178: Goncharov vs. Bogatyrev ==
ACA 178: Goncharov vs. Bogatyrev
- Promotion: Absolute Championship Akhmat
- Date: August 10, 2024
- Venue: Irina Viner-Usmanova Gymnastics Palace
- City: Moscow, Russia

ACA 178: Goncharov vs. Bogatyrev is a mixed martial arts event held by Absolute Championship Akhmat on August 10, 2024 at the Irina Viner-Usmanova Gymnastics Palace in Moscow, Russia.

=== Background ===
Bonus awards:

The following fighters were awarded bonuses:

- $50,000 Performance of the Night:
- $25,000 Performance of the Night:
- $5000 Stoppage Victory Bonuses:

=== Results ===
ACA 178
| Weight Class | | | | Method | Round | Time | Notes |
|---|---|---|---|---|---|---|---|
| Heavyweight 120 kg | (Russia) Evgeniy Goncharov (c) | def. | (Russia) Adam Bogatyrev | Decision (Unanimous) | 5 | 5:00 | 2023 ACA Heavyweight Grand Prix Final. For the ACA Heavyweight Championship. |
| Welterweight 77 kg | (Russia) Uzair Abdurakov | def. | (Russia) Anatoliy Boyko | TKO (Punches) | 2 | 3:17 | |
| Heavyweight 120 kg | (Russia) Alikhan Vakhaev | def. | (United States) Tony Johnson Jr. | Decision (Unanimous) | 3 | 5:00 | |
| Flyweight 57 kg | (Tajikistan) Anis Ekubov | def. | (Russia) Saygid Abdulaev | Decision (Split) | 3 | 5:00 | |
| Welterweight 77 kg | (Brazil) Vinicius Cruz | def. | (Ukraine) Vitaly Slipenko | Decision (Unanimous) | 3 | 5:00 | |
Preliminary card
| Middleweight 84 kg | (Russia) Abdul-Rakhman Dzhanaev | def. | (Russia) Ibragim Magomedov | Decision (Unanimous) | 3 | 5:00 | |
| Featherweight 66 kg | (Russia) Gleb Khabibulin | def. | (Tajikistan) Bekhruz Zukhurov | Decision (Unanimous) | 3 | 5:00 | |
| Heavyweight 120 kg | (Russia) Kirill Kornilov | def. | (Azerbaijan) Ruslan Medzhidov | Decision (Unanimous) | 3 | 5:00 | |
| Flyweight 57 kg | (Russia) Anatoly Kondratiev | def. | (Russia) Imran Bukuev | Decision (Unanimous) | 3 | 5:00 | Kondratiev missed weight (59.1 kg). |
| Middleweight 84 kg | (Russia) Ruslan Shamilov | def. | (Kyrgyzstan) Tilek Mashrapov | Decision (Unanimous) | 3 | 5:00 | |
| Middleweight 84 kg | (Russia) Gadzhimurad Khiramagomedov | def. | (Brazil) Rene Pessoa | Decision (Unanimous) | 3 | 5:00 | |
| Featherweight 66 kg | (Tajikistan) Kafiz Sakibekov | def. | (Russia) Dzhikhad Yunusov | Decision (Unanimous) | 3 | 5:00 | Yunusov missed weight (68.4 kg). |
| Featherweight 66 kg | (Tajikistan) Davlatmand Chuponov | def. | (Uzbekistan) Alisher Asamov | Submission (Rear-Naked Choke) | 1 | 3:59 | Chuponov missed weight (68.4 kg). |
| Flyweight 57 kg | (Tajikistan) Oyatullo Muminov | def. | (Afghanistan) Abdul Karim Badakhshi | Decision (Unanimous) | 3 | 5:00 | |
| Light Heavyweight 93 kg | (Russia) Arbi Aguev | def. | (Russia) Stepan Gorshechnikov | Decision (Unanimous) | 3 | 5:00 | |
| Flyweight 57 kg | (Kyrgyzstan) Daniiar Toichubek Uulu | def. | (Brazil) Alexsandro Praia | TKO (Punches) | 1 | 2:24 | Praia missed weight (59.55 kg). |

== ACA 179: Omarov vs Taygibov ==
ACA 179: Omarov vs Taygibov
- Promotion: Absolute Championship Akhmat
- Date: September 8, 2024
- Venue: Basket-Hall Krasnodar
- City: Krasnodar, Russia

ACA 179: Omarov vs Taygibov is a mixed martial arts event held by Absolute Championship Akhmat on September 8, 2024 at the Basket-Hall Krasnodar in Krasnodar, Russia.

=== Background ===
Bonus awards:

The following fighters were awarded bonuses:

- $50,000 Performance of the Night:
- $25,000 Performance of the Night:
- $5000 Stoppage Victory Bonuses:

=== Results ===
ACA 179
| Weight Class | | | | Method | Round | Time | Notes |
|---|---|---|---|---|---|---|---|
| Featherweight 66 kg | (Russia) Islam Omarov (c) | def. | (Russia) Kurban Taygibov | Submission (Guillotine Choke) | 2 | 1:40 | 2023 ACA Featherweight Grand Prix Final bout. For the ACA Featherweight Championship |
| Featherweight 66 kg | (Brazil) Felipe Froes | def. | (Russia) Alexey Polpudnikov | Decision (Split) | 3 | 5:00 | |
| Bantamweight 61 kg | (Russia) Timur Valiev | def. | (Russia) Makharbek Karginov | Decision (Split) | 3 | 5:00 | |
| Heavyweight 120 kg | (United Arab Emirates) Pouya Rahmani | def. | (Russia) Salimgerey Rasulov | Submission (Arm-Triangle Choke) | 1 | 2:32 | |
| Welterweight 77 kg | (Russia) Andrey Koshkin | def. | (Kazakhstan) Georgiy Kichigin | Decision (Unanimous) | 3 | 5:00 | |
Preliminary card
| Lightweight 70 kg | (Russia) Ramazan Kishev | def. | (Russia) Lom-Ali Nalgiev | Decision (Unanimous) | 3 | 5:00 | |
| Light Heavyweight 93 kg | (Kazakhstan) Evgeny Egemberdiev | def. | (Russia) Elkhan Musaev | TKO (Punches) | 1 | 1:19 | |
| Welterweight 77 kg | (Belarus) Denis Maher | def. | (Russia) Ivan Soloviev | TKO (Punches) | 2 | 2:55 | |
| Lightweight 70 kg | (Russia) Albert Gukov | def. | (Brazil) Herbert Batista | Decision (Unanimous) | 3 | 5:00 | |
| Middleweight 84 kg | (Brazil) Anderson Gonçalves | def. | (Russia) Ivan Bogdanov | KO (Punch) | 1 | 0:51 | |
| Lightweight 70 kg | (Russia) Abdul-Rakhman Temirov | def. | (Brazil) Hacran Dias | TKO (Punches) | 2 | 1:19 | |
| Lightweight 70 kg | (Russia) Gadzhimurad Magomedov | def. | (Russia) Bayzet Khatkhokhu | Decision (Unanimous) | 3 | 5:00 | |
| Featherweight 66 kg | (Brazil) Luis Rafael Laurentino | def. | (Russia) Nashkho Galaev | Decision (Majority) | 3 | 5:00 | |
| Bantamweight 61 kg | (Russia) Murad Magomedov | def. | (Armenia) Ayk Kazaryan | Decision (Unanimous) | 3 | 5:00 | |
| Featherweight 66 kg | (Russia) Bagama Nikabagamaev | def. | (Russia) Dzhambulat Zelimkhanov | Submission (Kimura) | 2 | 4:34 | |
| Light Heavyweight 93 kg | (Kyrgyzstan) Manas Temirbekov | def. | (Russia) Mukhamed Aushev | Decision (Split) | 3 | 5:00 | |
| Bantamweight 61 kg | (Russia) Albert Misikov | def. | (Brazil) Maycon Silvan | Decision (Unanimous) | 3 | 5:00 | |
| Flyweight 57 kg | (Armenia) Mkhitar Barseghyan | def. | (Russia) Akhmed Khamzaev | Decision (Unanimous) | 3 | 5:00 | |
| Lightweight 70 kg | (Russia) Murad Khasaev | def. | (Russia) Shadid Abdurazakov | Decision (Unanimous) | 3 | 5:00 | |

== ACA 180: Gadzhiev vs. Gaforov ==
ACA 180: Gadzhiev vs. Gaforov
- Promotion: Absolute Championship Akhmat
- Date: October 4, 2024
- Venue: Sport Hall Colosseum
- City: Grozny, Russia

ACA 180: Gadzhiev vs. Gaforov is a mixed martial arts event held by Absolute Championship Akhmat on October 4, 2024 at the Sport Hall Colosseum in Grozny, Russia.

=== Background ===
Bonus awards:

The following fighters were awarded bonuses:

- $50,000 Performance of the Night:
- $25,000 Performance of the Night:
- $5000 Stoppage Victory Bonuses:

=== Results ===
ACA 180
| Weight Class | | | | Method | Round | Time | Notes |
|---|---|---|---|---|---|---|---|
| Flyweight 57 kg | (Russia) Kurban Gadzhiev (c) | def. | (Tajikistan) Azam Gaforov | Decision (Unanimous) | 5 | 5:00 | 2023 ACA Flyweight Grand Prix Semi-Final bout. For the ACA Flyweight Championship |
| Bantamweight 61 kg | (Russia) Mehdi Baydulaev | def. | (Russia) Magomed Bibulatov | Submission (Rear-Naked Choke) | 1 | 3:26 | For the ACA Bantamweight Championship |
| Catchweight 73 kg | (Russia) Abdul-Rakhman Dudaev | def. | (Brazil) Daniel Oliveira | KO (Punch) | 2 | 2:44 | |
| Catchweight 73 kg | (Russia) Mukhamed Kokov | def. | (Brazil) Davi Ramos | Decision (Split) | 3 | 5:00 | |
| Light Heavyweight 93 kg | (Russia) Sulim Batalov | def. | (Russia) Ruslan Gabaraev | Decision (Unanimous) | 3 | 5:00 | |
Preliminary card
| Lightweight 70 kg | (Brazil) Herdeson Batista | def. | (Russia) Alexander Matmuratov | Submission (Rear-Naked Choke) | 3 | 4:09 | |
| Bantamweight 61 kg | (Brazil) Josiel Silva | def. | (Russia) Murad Kalamov | Decision (Unanimous) | 3 | 5:00 | |
| Catchweight 58 kg | (Russia) Mansur Khatuev | def. | (Kyrgyzstan) Ryskulbek Ibraimov | Decision (Unanimous) | 3 | 5:00 | |
| Heavyweight 120 kg | (Russia) Zumso Zuraev | def. | (Estonia) Denis Smoldarev | Submission (Arm-Triangle Choke) | 1 | 1:06 | |
| Lightweight 70 kg | (Belarus) Mikhail Odintsov | def. | (Russia) Islam Isaev | TKO (Doctor Stoppage) | 2 | 5:00 | |
| Middleweight 84 kg | (Russia) Bay-Ali Shaipov | def. | (Russia) Stanislav Vlasenko | Decision (Unanimous) | 3 | 5:00 | |
| Light Heavyweight 93 kg | (Brazil) Caio Bittencourt | def. | (Belarus) Sergey Starodub | TKO (Knee and Punches) | 2 | 0:33 | |
| Catchweight 64 kg | (Russia) Khasan Dadalov | def. | (Russia) Radzhab Ramazanov | Decision (Unanimous) | 3 | 5:00 | |
| Lightweight 70 kg | (Russia) Imam Vitakhanov | def. | (Kyrgyzstan) Bekbolot Abdylda Uulu | Submission (Rear-Naked Choke) | 1 | 1:49 | |
| Middleweight 84 kg | (Brazil) Ewerton Polaquini | def. | (Russia) Mikhail Doroshenko | Submission (Arm-Triangle Choke) | 3 | 4:29 | |
| Welterweight 77 kg | (Russia) Zelimkhan Amirov | def. | (Russia) Mikhail Doroshenko | TKO (Doctor Stoppage) | 2 | 5:00 | |
| Featherweight 66 kg | (Brazil) Denis Silva | def. | (Russia) Said-Magomed Gimbatov | Decision (Unanimous) | 3 | 5:00 | |
| Catchweight 68 kg | (Brazil) Rodrigo Praia | def. | (Russia) Igor Olchonov | Decision (Unanimous) | 3 | 5:00 | |
| Flyweight 57 kg | (Russia) Umalat Israpilov | def. | (Tajikistan) Masud Zamonov | Decision (Unanimous) | 3 | 5:00 | |
| Lightweight 70 kg | (Russia) Ali Suleymanov | def. | (Kyrgyzstan) Kanybek Zhanybek uulu | Decision (Unanimous) | 3 | 5:00 | |
| Featherweight 66 kg | (Brazil) John Teixeira | def. | (Russia) Viskhan Kadirov | Submission (Rear-Naked Choke) | 2 | 1:09 | |
| Bantamweight 61 kg | (Russia) Chermen Gobaev | def. | (Russia) Tamerlan Chagaev | Decision (Unanimous) | 3 | 5:00 | |

== ACA 181: Matevosyan vs. Gasanov ==
ACA 181: Matevosyan vs. Gasanov
- Promotion: Absolute Championship Akhmat
- Date: November 2, 2024
- Venue: Sibur Arena
- City: Saint Petersburg, Russia

ACA 181: Matevosyan vs. Gasanov is a mixed martial arts event held by Absolute Championship Akhmat on November 2, 2024 at the Sibur Arena in Saint Petersburg, Russia.

=== Background ===
Bonus awards:

The following fighters were awarded bonuses:

- $50,000 Performance of the Night:
- $25,000 Performance of the Night:
- $5000 Stoppage Victory Bonuses:

=== Fight card ===
ACA 181
| Weight Class | | | | Method | Round | Time | Notes |
|---|---|---|---|---|---|---|---|
| Light Heavyweight 93 kg | (Russia) Elmar Gasanov | def. | (Armenia) Grigor Matevosyan | Decision (unanimous) | 5 | 5:00 | |
| Heavyweight 120 kg | (Russia) Kirill Kornilov | def. | (Brazil) Carlos Felipe | Decision (unanimous) | 3 | 5:00 | |
| Middleweight 84 kg | (Bulgaria) Nikola Dipchikov | def. | (Russia) Murad Abdulaev | TKO (knee to the body and punches) | 2 | 2:43 | |
| Lightweight 71 kg | (Romania) Aurel Pîrtea | def. | (Russia) Pavel Gordeev | Decision (unanimous) | 3 | 5:00 | |
| Featherweight 66 kg | (Kyrgyzstan) Alimardan Abdykarov | def. | (Russia) Mikhail Egorov | Decision (unanimous) | 3 | 5:00 | |
Preliminary card
| Welterweight 77 kg | (Russia) Alexey Shurkevich | def. | (Brazil) Elias Silverio | Decision (unanimous) | 3 | 5:00 | |
| Featherweight 66 kg | (Azerbaijan) Tural Ragimov | def. | (Russia) Nikita Prikhodko | Submission (armbar) | 1 | 4:58 | |
| Middleweight 84 kg | (United States) Chris Honeycutt | def. | (Russia) Vladimir Vasilyev | Decision (unanimous) | 3 | 5:00 | |
| Light Heavyweight 93 kg | (Russia) Evgeny Erokhin | def. | (Russia) Artem Dushenko | TKO (punches) | 1 | 3:20 | |
| Welterweight 77 kg | (Kyrgyzstan) Jakshylyk Myrzabekov | def. | (Brazil) Lincoln Henrique | Submission (rear-naked choke) | 1 | 2:23 | |

== ACA 182: Odilov vs. Ibragimov ==
ACA 182: Odilov vs. Ibragimov is a mixed martial arts event held by Absolute Championship Akhmat on December 13, 2024 at the Irina Viner-Usmanova Gymnastics Palace in Moscow, Russia.

=== Background ===
Bonus awards:

The following fighters were awarded bonuses:

- $50,000 Performance of the Night:
- $25,000 Performance of the Night:
- $5000 Stoppage Victory Bonuses:

=== Fight card ===
ACA 182
| Weight Class | | | | Method | Round | Time | Notes |
|---|---|---|---|---|---|---|---|
| Light Heavyweight 93 kg | (Russia) Adlan Ibragimov | def. | (Tajikistan) Faridun Odilov | Submission (Rear-Naked Choke) | 4 | 2:28 | 2023 ACA Light Heavyweight Grand Prix Final bout. For the ACA Light Heavyweight Championship |
| Lightweight 70 kg | (Russia) Abdul-Aziz Abdulvakhabov (c) | def. | (Russia) Ali Abdulkhalikov | Decision (Split) | 5 | 5:00 | 2023 ACA Lightweight Grand Prix Semi-Final bout for the Unification of ACA Lightweight Championship |
| Flyweight 57 kg | (Russia) Anatoliy Kondratyev | def. | (Russia) Azamat Kerefov | KO (Punch and Elbows) | 2 | 3:47 | |
| Bantamweight 61 kg | (Russia) Oleg Borisov | def. | (Russia) Goga Shamatava | Decision (Unanimous) | 3 | 5:00 | |
| Heavyweight 120 kg | (Russia) Mukhomad Vakhaev | def. | (Brazil) Klidson Abreu | Decision (Unanimous) | 3 | 5:00 | |
Preliminary card
| Lightweight 70 kg | (Russia) Bibert Tumenov | def. | (Brazil) Raush Manfio | KO (Punch) | 1 | 3:20 | |
| Welterweight 77 kg | (Russia) Alexey Makhno | def. | (Belarus) Ruslan Kolodko | KO (Head Kick and Punches) | 1 | 3:32 | |
| Light Heavyweight 93 kg | (Russia) Maxim Grishin | def. | (Russia) Oleg Olenichev | Decision (Unanimous) | 3 | 5:00 | |
| Middleweight 84 kg | (Russia) Sergey Kalinin | def. | (Russia) Mikhail Dolgov | Decision (Split) | 3 | 5:00 | |
| Bantamweight 61 kg | (Tajikistan) Osimkhon Rakhmonov | def. | (Brazil) Charles Henrique | Decision (Unanimous) | 3 | 5:00 | |
| Welterweight 77 kg | (Armenia) Viktor Azatyan | def. | (Russia) Yusup Umarov | Submission (Guillotine Choke) | 3 | 3:17 | |

== See also ==
- List of current ACA fighters
- 2024 in UFC
- 2024 in Bellator MMA
- 2024 in Professional Fighters League
- 2024 in ONE Championship
- 2024 in Konfrontacja Sztuk Walki
- 2024 in Rizin Fighting Federation
- 2024 in LUX Fight League
- 2024 in Oktagon MMA
- 2024 in Brave Combat Federation
- 2024 in UAE Warriors
- 2024 in Legacy Fighting Alliance
- 2024 in Cage Warriors
