= Magomed Bibulatov =

Russian mixed martial arts fighter (born 1988)

- Born: August 22, 1988 (age 38); Grozny, Chechen-Ingush ASSR, Russian SFSR, Soviet Union
- Native name: Магомед Бибулатов
- Other names: Chaborz
- Nationality: Russian
- Height: 5 ft 5 in (1.65 m)
- Weight: 125 lb (57 kg; 8.9 st)
- Division: Bantamweight; Flyweight
- Reach: 65 in (165 cm)
- Fighting out of: Grozny, Chechnya, Russia; Paris, France
- Team: Akhmat Fight Club (current); Gladiator Fight Club (former)
- Years active: 2013–2024

Mixed martial arts record
- Total: 25
- Wins: 21
- By knockout: 6
- By submission: 5
- By decision: 10
- Losses: 4
- By knockout: 1
- By submission: 1
- By decision: 2

Other information
- Mixed martial arts record from Sherdog

Magomed Khasanovich Bibulatov (Russian: Магомед Хасанович Бибулатов; born August 22, 1988) is a retired Russian mixed martial artist who competed in the Bantamweight and flyweight divisions, most notably in the Ultimate Fighting Championship and ACA. He is the former World Series of Fighting Flyweight Champion. He is the former ACA Bantamweight Champion.

== Background ==
Bibulatov was born and raised in Achkhoy-Martan, Chechnya, Russia on August 22, 1988. He started to train karate at 6 years. After high school he went to Chechen State University for Law faculty. Then he moved to France and trained at Gladiator Fight Club. When he had 5 win streak in European MMA organizations, he came back to Russia and started representing Fight Club Akhmat with Ramzan Kadyrov's help.

== Mixed martial arts career ==
=== Early career ===
Before joining the UFC Bibulatov amassed a record of 13-0 including wins against future UFC veteran Taylor Lapilus.

=== World Series of Fighting ===
Bibulatov faced Donavon Frelow for the vacant flyweight title on October 7, 2015, at WSOF 24. He won the fight by unanimous decision and become a new WSOF flyweight champion.

=== Ultimate Fighting Championship ===
Bibulatov made his promotional debut for the UFC at UFC 210 against Jenel Lausa. He won the fight by unanimous decision.

Bibulatov faced John Moraga on October 7, 2017, at UFC 216. He lost the fight via knockout in the first round.

Bibulatov was scheduled to face Ulka Sasaki on April 21, 2018, at UFC Fight Night 128. However, he was removed from the card due to back injury.

Bibulatov faced promotional newcomer Rogério Bontorin on February 2, 2019, at UFC Fight Night 144. At weigh-ins, Bibulatov weighed one pound over the flyweight non-title fight limit of 126 and was fined 20% of his purse to Bontorin. Bibulatov lost the fight via split decision.

On May 7, 2019, it was reported that Bibulatov was released by UFC and signed with Absolute Championship Akhmat.

=== Absolute Championship Akhmat ===
As the first fight after his release from the UFC Bibulatov returned to ACA, facing Josiel Silva at ACA 100 on October 4, 2019. He won the bout via technical knockout in the second round.

Next, he faced Nikita Chistyakov at ACA 107 on July 24, 2020. He won the fight via first-round technical knockout.

Bibulatov faced Rodrigo Praia at ACA 112 on October 4, 2020. He won the fight via first-round knockout.

Bibulatov faced reigning champ Daniel Oliveira on March 26, 2021, at ACA 120: Oliveira vs. Bibulatov for the ACA Bantamweight Championship. After winning the first 4 rounds, Bibulatov survived a flurry in the last round to secure a unanimous decision, also winning the title in the process.

Bibulatov defended his title for the first time against Oleg Borisov at ACA 138 on March 27, 2022. He lost the bout and title via unanimous decision.

Bibulatov faced Charles Henrique in his first bout post title reign on December 23, 2022, at ACA 150, winning the close bout via split decision.

=== ACA Bantamweight Grand Prix ===
In the Quarter-finals of the 2023 ACA Bantamweight Grand Prix, Bibulatov faced Vazha Tsiptauri on August 11, 2023, at ACA 161, winning the bout via unanimous decision.

In the Semi-Finals, Bibulatov faced Tomáš Deák on January 26, 2024 at ACA 169: Bibulatov vs. Deák, winning the bout via TKO stoppage due to leg kicks and ground and pound in the third round, advancing to the finals.

== Championships and accomplishments ==
- Absolute Championship Akhmat
  - ACA Bantamweight Championship (One time)
- World Series of Fighting
  - WSOF Flyweight Championship (One time)
- World Fighting Championship Akhmat
  - WFCA Flyweight Championship (One time)
- Absolute Championship Berkut
  - ACB Bantamweight Grand-Prix winner

== Mixed martial arts record ==
Professional record breakdown
25 matches	21 wins	4 losses
By knockout	6	1
By submission	5	1
By decision	10	2

Res.	Record	Opponent	Method	Event	Date	Round	Time	Location	Notes
Loss	21–4	Mehdi Baydulaev	Submission (rear-naked choke)	ACA 180	October 4, 2024	1	3:26	Grozny, Russia	2023 ACA Bantamweight Grand Prix Final.
Win	21–3	Tomáš Deák	TKO (leg kick and punches)	ACA 169	January 26, 2024	3	3:48	Grozny, Russia	2023 ACA Bantamweight Grand Prix Semifinal.
Win	20–3	Vazha Tsiptauri	Decision (unanimous)	ACA 161	August 11, 2023	5	5:00	Moscow, Russia	2023 ACA Bantamweight Grand Prix Quarterfinal.
Win	19–3	Charles Henrique	Decision (split)	ACA 150	December 23, 2022	3	5:00	Moscow, Russia	
Loss	18–3	Oleg Borisov	Decision (unanimous)	ACA 138	March 27, 2022	5	5:00	Grozny, Russia	Lost the ACA Bantamweight Championship.
Win	18–2	Daniel Oliveira	Decision (unanimous)	ACA 120	March 26, 2021	5	5:00	Saint Petersburg, Russia	Won the ACA Bantamweight Championship.
Win	17–2	Rodrigo Praia	KO (spinning back kick)	ACA 112	October 4, 2020	1	1:11	Grozny, Russia	
Win	16–2	Nikita Chistyakov	TKO (elbows and punches)	ACA 107	July 24, 2020	1	3:36	Moscow, Russia	Return to Bantamweight.
Win	15–2	Josiel Silva	TKO (punches)	ACA 100	October 4, 2019	2	2:40	Grozny, Russia	
Loss	14–2	Rogério Bontorin	Decision (split)	UFC Fight Night: Assunção vs. Moraes 2	February 2, 2019	3	5:00	Fortaleza, Brazil	
Loss	14–1	John Moraga	KO (punch)	UFC 216	October 7, 2017	1	1:38	Las Vegas, Nevada, United States	
Win	14–0	Jenel Lausa	Decision (unanimous)	UFC 210	April 8, 2017	3	5:00	Buffalo, New York, United States	Bibulatov was deducted one point in round 2 due to a groin strike.
Win	13–0	Yunus Evloev	Submission (guillotine choke)	WFCA 30	October 4, 2016	2	0:40	Grozny, Russia	Won the 2016 WCFA Flyweight Grand Prix.
Win	12–0	Giovanni Santos Jr.	TKO (punches)	WFCA 22	May 22, 2016	1	N/A	Grozny, Russia	2016 WCFA Flyweight Grand Prix Semifinal.
Win	11–0	Irmeson Cavalcante	Decision (unanimous)	WFCA 16	March 12, 2016	3	5:00	Grozny, Russia	2016 WCFA Flyweight Grand Prix Quarterfinal.
Win	10–0	Donavon Frelow	Decision (unanimous)	WSOF 24	October 7, 2015	5	5:00	Mashantucket, Connecticut, United States	Flyweight debut. Won the inaugural WSOF Flyweight Championship. Later vacated title.
Win	9–0	Eduardo Felipe	KO (punch)	WFCA 1	March 14, 2015	1	1:30	Grozny, Russia	
Win	8–0	Olivier Pastor	Decision (unanimous)	ACB 10	October 4, 2014	3	5:00	Grozny, Russia	
Win	7–0	Said Nurmagomedov	Decision (unanimous)	ACB 9	June 22, 2014	3	5:00	Grozny, Russia	Won the 2014 ACB Bantamweight Grand Prix.
Win	6–0	Shamil Shakhbiev	Submission (armbar)	ACB 7	May 18, 2014	1	0:50	Grozny, Russia	2014 ACB Bantamweight Grand Prix Semifinal.
Win	5–0	Taylor Lapilus	Decision (unanimous)	GEFC: Urban Legend Prestige 4	October 12, 2013	3	5:00	Villepinte, France	
Win	4–0	Oscar Nave	Decision (unanimous)	World Ultimate Full Contact 2013	August 24, 2013	2	5:00	Lamego, Portugal	
Win	3–0	Mickael Kanguichev	Submission (armbar)	World Ultimate Full Contact 2013	August 24, 2013	1	3:37	Lamego, Portugal	
Win	2–0	Magomedrasul Omarov	Submission (triangle choke)	World Ultimate Full Contact 2013	August 24, 2013	1	3:08	Lamego, Portugal	
Win	1–0	Mohamed Sadok	Submission (armbar)	GEFC: Urban Legend Prestige 2	June 8, 2013	1	3:36	Villepinte, France	Bantamweight debut.
