= Tony Johnson (fighter) =

American mixed martial arts fighter

Tony Johnson Jr.
- Born: Anthony Johnson Jr. February 6, 1986 (age 40); Killeen, Texas, U.S.
- Other names: "Hulk"
- Height: 6 ft 1 in (1.85 m)
- Weight: 265 lb (120 kg; 18.9 st)
- Division: Heavyweight
- Reach: 74 in (188 cm)
- Fighting out of: Nashville, Tennessee, U.S.
- Team: Nashville MMA /Sidthilaw Muay Thai/American Kickboxing Academy
- Years active: 2008–present (MMA); 2017 (Kickboxing)

Kickboxing record
- Total: 1
- Wins: 0
- Losses: 1
- By knockout: 1

Mixed martial arts record
- Total: 31
- Wins: 18
- By knockout: 10
- By submission: 1
- By decision: 7
- Losses: 11
- By knockout: 3
- By submission: 1
- By decision: 7
- Draws: 1
- No contests: 1

Other information
- Mixed martial arts record from Sherdog

Anthony Johnson Jr. (born February 6, 1986) is an American mixed martial artist currently competing in the Heavyweight division of Absolute Championship Akhmat where he is the former ACA Heavyweight Champion. A professional competitor since 2008, Johnson has formerly competed for Bellator MMA, ONE Fighting Championship, Fight Nights Global, and King of the Cage. He is the former KOTC Heavyweight Champion. He is ranked #6 in the ACA heavyweight rankings.

== Mixed martial arts career ==
=== King of the Cage ===
After going undefeated in his first three professional mixed martial arts fights, Johnson signed with King of the Cage and challenged Tony Lopez for his KOTC heavyweight championship on March 26, 2010, at KOTC: Legacy. Also being the KOTC light heavyweight champion, Lopez was undefeated his last sixteen fights, which marked Johnson's most experienced opponent at the time. Johnson recorded the upset, using his wrestling to defeat the much more experienced Lopez via unanimous decision and becoming the KOTC heavyweight champion in just only his fourth professional fight.

Johnson made his first title defense against then prospect and future UFC light heavyweight champion Daniel Cormier at KOTC: Imminent Danger on August 13, 2010. He lost the fight and KOTC heavyweight championship in the first round via rear-naked choke submission, resulting in his first professional loss.

Johnson rebounded from his loss to Cormier by defeating Boban Simic via unanimous decision on November 13, 2010 at KOTC: Infusion.

=== Bellator ===
In April 2011, it was announced that Johnson had signed with Bellator, with his promotional debut expected to take place at Bellator 41 on April 16 against Carlos Flores. Johnson, however, was later replaced by Rudy Aguilar for unknown reasons. Johnson eventually made his promotional debut against current UFC competitor Derrick Lewis at Bellator 46 on June 25, 2011. He won the fight via unanimous decision by 29–28 on the scorecards.

=== ONE Fighting Championship ===
After being sidelined for nearly two years due to issues with his Bellator contract, Johnson signed with Singapore-based promotion ONE Championship and faced former UFC heavyweight champion Tim Sylvia at ONE Fighting Championship: Rise to Power on May 31, 2013. The fight was contested at a catchweight of 271 lbs. after Sylvia missed weight. Johnson won the fight via TKO due to a doctor stoppage in the third round after an elbow by Johnson opened up a cut on Sylvia's forehead.

Johnson next faced Chris Lokteff at ONE Fighting Championship: Warrior Spirit on November 15, 2013. He lost the fight via split decision.

=== Independent promotions ===
Over a year later, on November 22, 2014, Johnson faced Robert Neal at V3 Fights: Neal vs. Johnson and won via TKO due to elbows in the very first round.

=== Return to Bellator ===
Johnson re-signed with Bellator and faced former Bellator heavyweight champion Alexander Volkov at Bellator 136 on April 10, 2015. He won the fight via split decision. One judge scored the fight 29–28 for Volkov, while the other two judges scored it 29–28 to Johnson.

Johnson faced former professional boxer Raphael Butler at Bellator 148 on January 29, 2016. Johnson utilised his wrestling to take Butler down and wear him down, before the referee stopped the bout in favour of Johnson, late in the third round due to punches (TKO).

Johnson faced Cheick Kongo at Bellator 161 on September 16, 2016. He lost via majority decision. One judge had it 28–28 (even), while the other two judges scored the bout 29–28 in favor of Kongo.

=== Kickboxing debut ===
Johnson made his professional kickboxing debut on April 7, 2017 at SUPERKOMBAT World Grand Prix I 2017 in Bucharest, Romania, being defeated by TKO (doctor stoppage) in round 1. If Johnson had won his bout against Lukasz Krupadziorow, he would have face Cătălin Moroșanu at SUPERKOMBAT World Grand Prix II 2017 in Madrid, Spain.

=== Absolute Championship Akhmat ===
He fought for the vacant ACA Heavyweight Championship against Daniel Omielańczuk at ACA 114: Omielańczuk vs. Johnson. He won the fight by KO in the first round, becoming the first opponent to knock him out in 36 fights.

Johnson defended his title on April 23, 2021 at ACA 122 against Dmitry Poberezhets. He won the bout via TKO from ground and pound in the third round.

Johnson defended his title against Mukhumat Vakhaev on November 18, 2021 at ACA 132: Johnson vs. Vakhaev. He won the bout after dropping Vakhaev and then finishing him on the ground at the end of the first round.

Johnson was scheduled to make his third title defense against Salimgerey Rasulov at ACA 137 on March 6, 2022. After being unable to obtain a visa in time, Johnson was forced to pull out of the bout.

Johnson was rescheduled against Salimgerey Rasulov for ACA 138 on March 27, 2022. He lost the bout and title after being knocked out in the first round.

Johnson faced Evgeniy Goncharov on September 23, 2022 at ACA 145. He lost the bout via knockout at the end of the first round.

In the Quarter-final of the 2023 ACA Heavyweight Grand Prix Johnson faced Anton Vyazigin on June 2, 2023 at ACA 158: Mokhnatkin vs Olenichev, losing the bout via unanimous decision.

Johnson rebounded in a rematch against Denis Smoldarev on November 3, 2023 at ACA 165: Dakaev vs. Batista, knocking Smoldarev out twenty one seconds into the bout.

Johnson faced Carlos Felipe on March 29, 2024 at ACA 173: Frolov vs. Yankovsky, winning the bout via split decision.

== Personal life ==
Johnson has four daughters.

Johnson used to train at Evolution MMA in Miami, FL. A gym owned by Head Coach Dan Monteleone.

Johnson currently trains at Nashville MMA in Nashville, TN.

== Championships and accomplishments ==
=== Mixed martial arts ===
- King of the Cage
  - KOTC heavyweight championship (one time)
- Absolute Championship Akhmat
  - ACA Heavyweight Championship (One time)
    - Two successful title defenses

== Kickboxing record ==
Professional kickboxing record
0 wins, 1 loss (1 (T)KO), 0 draws
Date	Result	Opponent	Event	Location	Method	Round	Time
2017-04-07	Loss	(Poland) Lukasz Krupadziorow	SUPERKOMBAT World Grand Prix I 2017	Bucharest, Romania	TKO (doctor stoppage)	1	0:58
Legend: Win Loss Draw/No contest Notes

== Mixed martial arts record ==
Professional record breakdown
31 matches	18 wins	11 losses
By knockout	10	3
By submission	1	1
By decision	7	7
Draws	1	
No contests	1	

Res.	Record	Opponent	Method	Event	Date	Round	Time	Location	Notes
Loss	18–11–1 (1)	Kirill Kornilov	Decision (unanimous)	ACA 202	April 12, 2026	5	5:00	Saint Petersburg, Russia	
Loss	18–10–1 (1)	Amir Aliakbari	Decision (unanimous)	ACA 194	October 23, 2025	5	5:00	Dubai, United Arab Emirates	
Loss	18–9–1 (1)	Alikhan Vakhaev	Decision (unanimous)	ACA 178	August 16, 2024	3	5:00	Moscow, Russia	
Win	18–8–1 (1)	Carlos Felipe	Decision (split)	ACA 173	March 29, 2024	3	5:00	Minsk, Belarus	
Win	17–8–1 (1)	Denis Smoldarev	KO (punch)	ACA 165	November 3, 2023	1	0:21	Saint Petersburg, Russia	
Loss	16–8–1 (1)	Anton Vyazigin	Decision (unanimous)	ACA 158	June 2, 2023	5	5:00	Saint Petersburg, Russia	2023 ACA Heavyweight Grand Prix Quarterfinal.
Loss	16–7–1 (1)	Evgeniy Goncharov	KO (punch)	ACA 145	September 23, 2022	1	4:37	Saint Petersburg, Russia	
Loss	16–6–1 (1)	Salimgerey Rasulov	TKO (punches)	ACA 138	March 27, 2022	1	1:40	Grozny, Russia	Lost the ACA Heavyweight Championship.
Win	16–5–1 (1)	Mukhumat Vakhaev	TKO (punches)	ACA 132	November 18, 2021	1	4:23	Minsk, Belarus	Defended the ACA Heavyweight Championship.
Win	15–5–1 (1)	Dmitry Poberezhets	TKO (punches)	ACA 122	April 23, 2021	3	4:04	Minsk, Belarus	Defended the ACA Heavyweight Championship.
Win	14–5–1 (1)	Daniel Omielańczuk	KO (punch)	ACA 114	November 26, 2020	1	1:09	Łódź, Poland	Won the vacant ACA Heavyweight Championship.
Loss	13–5–1 (1)	Evgeniy Goncharov	Decision (unanimous)	ACA 97	August 31, 2019	5	5:00	Krasnodar, Russia	For the inaugural ACA Heavyweight Championship.
NC	13–4–1 (1)	Evgeniy Goncharov	NC (accidental eye poke)	ACA 96	June 8, 2019	3	0:50	Łódź, Poland	For the inaugural ACA Heavyweight Championship. Accidental eye poke rendered Johnson unable to continue.
Win	13–4–1	Denis Smoldarev	Submission (arm-triangle choke)	ACA 92	February 16, 2019	1	2:42	Warsaw, Poland	
Win	12–4–1	D.J. Linderman	Decision (unanimous)	Final Fight Championship 34	November 16, 2018	3	5:00	Las Vegas, Nevada, United States	
Draw	11–4–1	Aleksander Emelianenko	Draw (majority)	WFCA 50	August 18, 2018	3	5:00	Moscow, Russia	
Loss	11–4	Vitaly Minakov	TKO (punches)	Fight Nights Global 82	December 16, 2017	2	0:38	Moscow, Russia	
Win	11–3	Magomedbag Agaev	TKO (punches)	Fight Nights Global 68	June 2, 2017	1	1:20	Saint Petersburg, Russia	
Loss	10–3	Cheick Kongo	Decision (majority)	Bellator 161	September 16, 2016	3	5:00	Cedar Park, Texas, United States	
Win	10–2	Raphael Butler	TKO (punches)	Bellator 148	January 29, 2016	3	4:24	Fresno, California, United States	
Win	9–2	Alexander Volkov	Decision (split)	Bellator 136	April 10, 2015	3	5:00	Irvine, California, United States	
Win	8–2	Robert Neal	TKO (elbows)	V3 Fights: Neal vs. Johnson	November 22, 2014	1	1:21	Nashville, Tennessee, United States	
Loss	7–2	Chris Lokteff	Decision (split)	ONE FC: Warrior Spirit	November 15, 2013	3	5:00	Kuala Lumpur, Malaysia	
Win	7–1	Tim Sylvia	TKO (doctor stoppage)	ONE FC: Rise to Power	May 31, 2013	3	3:25	Pasay, Philippines	Catchweight (271 lb) bout; Sylvia missed weight.
Win	6–1	Derrick Lewis	Decision (unanimous)	Bellator 46	June 25, 2011	3	5:00	Hollywood, Florida, United States	
Win	5–1	Boban Simic	Decision (unanimous)	KOTC: Infusion	November 13, 2010	3	5:00	Las Vegas, Nevada, United States	
Loss	4–1	Daniel Cormier	Submission (rear-naked choke)	KOTC: Imminent Danger	August 13, 2010	1	2:27	Mescalero, New Mexico, United States	Lost the KOTC Heavyweight Championship.
Win	4–0	Tony Lopez	Decision (unanimous)	KOTC: Legacy	March 26, 2010	5	5:00	Reno, Nevada, United States	Won the KOTC Heavyweight Championship.
Win	3–0	Cedric James	TKO (punches)	G-Force Fights: Bad Blood 2	September 26, 2009	1	1:44	Coral Gables, Florida, United States	
Win	2–0	Steven Banks	Decision (unanimous)	BGONA: Warriors of the Ring	August 22, 2009	3	5:00	Greensboro, North Carolina, United States	
Win	1–0	Kenny Garner	TKO (punches)	G-Force Fights: Bad Blood 1	November 6, 2008	2	3:50	Miami, Florida, United States	Heavyweight debut.

== See also ==
- List of current ACA fighters
- List of Bellator MMA alumni
- List of male mixed martial artists
