= Evgeniy Goncharov =

Russian mixed martial arts fighter

- Born: August 3, 1986 (age 40); Krivyanskaya, Oktyabrsky District, Rostov Oblast, Russian SFSR
- Nationality: Russian
- Height: 6 ft 2 in (1.88 m)
- Weight: 260 lb (118 kg; 18 st 8 lb)
- Division: Heavyweight
- Reach: 72 in (183 cm)
- Fighting out of: Novocherkassk, Russia
- Team: Raty Team
- Years active: 2012–present

Mixed martial arts record
- Total: 28
- Wins: 24
- By knockout: 8
- By submission: 2
- By decision: 14
- Losses: 3
- By knockout: 2
- By submission: 1
- No contests: 1

Other information
- Mixed martial arts record from Sherdog

Evgeniy Viktorovich Goncharov (Russian: Евгений Викторович Гончаров; born August 3, 1986) is a Russian mixed martial artist who competes in the Heavyweight division. He is most notable for his time in Absolute Championship Akhmat (ACA), where he was the ACA Heavyweight Champion. In July 2023, Goncharov reached #15 in World Heavyweight rankings according to Fight Matrix.

== Background ==
Evgeny Viktorovich Goncharov is a native of the village of Krivyanskaya, located in the Oktyabrsky District of Rostov Oblast. From an early age, Goncharov began to get involved in football, spending a lot of time on the field with friends and watching all the matches on TV. However, all this did not become something more than an ordinary hobby, and throughout all the school years, Goncharov did not stand out from the rest with sports success. Moreover, the “troika” in physical education was quite normal for him.

But after graduation, the guy dramatically changed his attitude to physical activity and joined the martial arts, starting to engage in army hand-to-hand combat. In a fairly short time, Evgeny began to show good results, which allowed him to start performing amateurs in several combat disciplines. Active immersion in the world of martial arts did not prevent higher education. First of all, the young man went to study as a lawyer, but in the future he also entered the Polytechnic University in Novocherkassk, where he mastered the profession of “Trainer-teacher”. In parallel with his studies, Evgeny actively competed at various levels. As a result, Goncharov managed to win the titles of the champion in kickboxing, ARB, universal combat, and also prove himself in freestyle wrestling and boxing. With such a set of skills, Goncharov was destined to get into mixed martial arts.

== Mixed martial arts career ==
=== Early career ===
Goncharov began his career as a professional MMA fighter in 2013, debuting at the TKFC Black Sea Open Cup 3 tournament where he defeated Denis Yezuta by split decision. He faced a setback two weeks later at the Black Sea Open Cup 5, losing by knockout to Ayub Khatuev. Between 2014 and 2017, Goncharov competed in 9 fights across various organizations including ProFC and M-1, experiencing only one loss. His significant success came with the WFCA, where he debuted in September 2017 at the WFCA 42 tournament, defeating Igor Slesarchuk. Following two more victories against Alexei Stoyan and Brandon Cash, Goncharov became a contender for the heavyweight belt. At the WFCA 50 tournament, he secured the title by decisively knocking out Zelimkhan Umiyev.

=== Absolute Championship Akhmat ===
After WFCA merged with ACB to form ACA, Goncharov transitioned to the new organization. He fought for the title against Tony Johnson Jr. at ACA 96, but the match was halted due to an accidental eye poke.

In a rematch against Tony Johnson Jr. at ACA 97, Goncharov won unanimously, becoming the ACA Heavyweight Champion. In his first title defence, he took on Mukhumat Vakhaev at ACA 104, Goncharov was much more active during the first two rounds and successfully interrupted his opponent in the standing position. The public observed the same picture in the 3rd round, but Vakhaev decided to go the other way, delivering several illegal blows to the back of the opponent's head. Eugene later said that after these blows, he began to feel weakened and could not fight normally, resulting in him losing in the third round via guillotine submission.

In October 2020, at RCC 9, Goncharov won unanimously against Anton Vyazigin. He returned to ACA in 2021 and knocked out Daniel Omielańczuk in the third round at ACA 128.

In September 2022, during the co-main event of the ACA 145 tournament, Russian heavyweight Evgeny Goncharov faced off once again Tony Johnson Jr. Goncharov managed to knock Johnson down with a powerful left hook to the head in the first round, leading to a TKO victory for Goncharov.

Goncharov later participated in a rematch with Muhumat Vakhaev at the ACA 150 tournament. Despite a competitive first half, Goncharov accelerated his pace and increased his punch volume by the third round. While there was a moment where Goncharov seemed close to an early victory, fatigue set in, and the fighters slowed down. The fight went to the final gong, with all five judges unanimously scoring the winner 29–28 in Goncharov's favor.

Finally, Goncharov fought against champion Alikhan Vakhaev in the Quarterfinal of the 2023 ACA Heavyweight Grand Prix at ACA 154. Goncharov began the fight energetically, throwing hand combinations, but Vakhaev controlled the distance and didn't receive any significant hits. In the second round, Vakhaev knocked down Goncharov and attempted to finish on the ground, but Goncharov defended himself and launched his own attack. The pace of the fight slowed in the third and fourth rounds, with the fighters exchanging blows in a standing position, with Goncharov showing more activity. The final period was largely uneventful and took place in the clinch near the net. After five rounds, Goncharov won the fight with scores of 49–46, 48–47, 48–47, 48–47, and 48–47, making him the new ACA Heavyweight Champion.

In the semi-final, Goncharov rematched Anton Vyazigin on February 9, 2024 at ACA 170, defending the title and advancing to the final via unanimous decision in a very close bout.

== Championships and accomplishments ==
=== Mixed martial arts ===
- Absolute Championship Akhmat
  - ACA Heavyweight Championship (Two times, former)
- Akhmat Fight Club
  - AFC Heavyweight Championship (One time)

== Mixed martial arts record ==
Professional record breakdown
28 matches	24 wins	3 losses
By knockout	8	2
By submission	2	1
By decision	14	0
No contests	1	

Res.	Record	Opponent	Method	Event	Date	Round	Time	Location	Notes
Win	24–3 (1)	Jailton Almeida	Decision (unanimous)	ACA 207	September 12, 2026	3	5:00	Krasnodar, Russia	
Win	23–3 (1)	Khadis Ibragimov	Decision (unanimous)	ACA 204	June 19, 2026	3	5:00	Omsk, Russia	
Win	22–3 (1)	Adam Bogatyrev	Decision (unanimous)	ACA 178	August 16, 2024	5	5:00	Moscow, Russia	Defended the ACA Heavyweight Championship. Won the 2023 ACA Heavyweight Grand Prix. Later vacated the title due to injury.
Win	21–3 (1)	Anton Vyazigin	Decision (unanimous)	ACA 170	February 9, 2024	5	5:00	Moscow, Russia	Defended the ACA Heavyweight Championship. 2023 ACA Heavyweight Grand Prix Semifinal.
Win	20–3 (1)	Alikhan Vakhaev	Decision (unanimous)	ACA 154	March 17, 2023	5	5:00	Krasnodar, Russia	Won the ACA Heavyweight Championship. 2023 ACA Heavyweight Grand Prix Quarterfinal.
Win	19–3 (1)	Mukhamad Vakhaev	Decision (unanimous)	ACA 150	December 23, 2022	3	5:00	Moscow, Russia	
Win	18–3 (1)	Tony Johnson Jr.	KO (punch)	ACA 145	September 23, 2022	1	4:37	Saint Petersburg, Russia	
Win	17–3 (1)	Daniel Omielańczuk	TKO (punches)	ACA 128	September 11, 2021	3	1:39	Minsk, Belarus	
Win	16–3 (1)	Anton Vyazigin	Decision (unanimous)	RCC 8	December 19, 2020	3	5:00	Ekaterinburg, Russia	
Loss	15–3 (1)	Mukhamad Vakhaev	Submission (guillotine choke)	ACA 104	February 21, 2020	3	4:47	Krasnodar, Russia	Lost the ACA Heavyweight Championship.
Win	15–2 (1)	Tony Johnson Jr.	Decision (unanimous)	ACA 97	August 31, 2019	5	5:00	Krasnodar, Russia	Won the inaugural ACA Heavyweight Championship.
NC	14–2 (1)	Tony Johnson Jr.	NC (accidental eye poke)	ACA 96	June 8, 2019	3	0:50	Łódź, Poland	For the inaugural ACA Heavyweight Championship. Accidental eye poke rendered Johnson unable to continue.
Win	14–2	Zelimkhan Umiev	TKO (punches)	WFCA 50	August 18, 2018	1	4:06	Moscow, Russia	Won the AFC Heavyweight Championship.
Win	13–2	Brandon Cash	TKO (punches)	WCFA 48	May 4, 2018	1	2:17	Baku, Azerbaijan	
Win	12–2	Alexey Stoyan	Submission (rear-naked choke)	WFCA 44	December 17, 2017	1	N/A	Grozny, Russia	
Win	11–2	Igor Sliusarchuk	Decision (unanimous)	WFCA 42	September 27, 2017	3	5:00	Moscow, Russia	
Win	10–2	Daniil Arepyev	Decision (unanimous)	M-1 Challenge 76	April 22, 2017	3	5:00	Nazran, Russia	
Win	9–2	Alexander Pugachev	Decision (unanimous)	IV Elements Fighting Cup 1	November 18, 2016	2	5:00	Volgograd, Russia	
Win	8–2	Vladimir Larionov	Submission (guillotine choke)	U-Fight: Battle Of The Highlanders 3	September 16, 2016	1	1:00	Taganrog, Russia	
Win	7–2	Zelimkhan Davtaev	TKO (punches)	Russian MMA Union: 2016 Southern Federal District MMA	April 12, 2016	1	4:10	Krasnodar, Russia	
Win	6–2	Yuri Gorbenko	TKO (punches)	ProFC 60	April 2, 2016	1	4:23	Rostov-on-Don, Russia	
Loss	5–2	Yusup Suliemanov	KO (punch)	ProFC 58	November 8, 2015	1	4:20	Rostov-on-Don, Russia	
Win	5–1	Nikolai Danilov	TKO (retirement)	ProFC 57	March 29, 2015	1	1:02	Rostov-on-Don, Russia	
Win	4–1	Mikhail Demidov	Decision (unanimous)	Rostov Martial Arts Night 2014	August 30, 2014	2	5:00	Shakhty, Russia	
Win	3–1	Abdulbasir Medzhidov	TKO (punches)	Legion Fight: Black Sea Cup 2014 (Stage 2)	August 18, 2014	1	2:35	Anapa, Russia	
Loss	2–1	Ayub Khatuev	TKO (punches)	Tech-Krep FC: Black Sea Open Cup 5	August 23, 2013	1	1:50	Anapa, Russia	Tech-Krep FC Heavyweight Tournament Semifinal.
Win	2–0	Denis Ezuta	Decision (split)	Tech-Krep FC: Black Sea Open Cup 3	August 9, 2013	2	5:00	Anapa, Russia	Heavyweight debut. Tech-Krep FC Heavyweight Tournament Quarterfinal.
Win	1–0	Yusup Magomedov	Decision (unanimous)	Legion Fight: Black Sea Cup 2012 (Stage 5)	August 22, 2012	3	5:00	Anapa, Russia	Welterweight debut.

== See also ==
- List of current ACA fighters
- List of male mixed martial artists
