= Davi Ramos =

Brazilian mixed martial artist

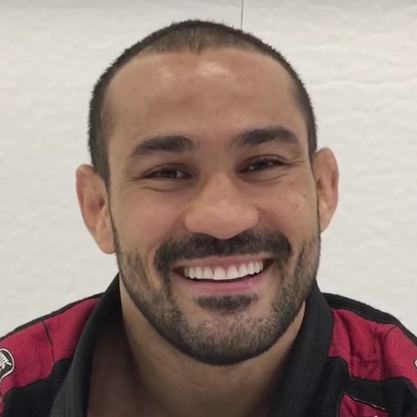
- Born: Davi Ramos Pinheiro da Silva; November 5, 1986 (age 39); Rio de Janeiro, Brazil
- Other names: The Tasmanian Devil
- Height: 5 ft 8 in (1.73 m)
- Weight: 155 lb (70 kg; 11.1 st)
- Division: Lightweight; Welterweight
- Reach: 70 in (178 cm)
- Style: Brazilian Jiu Jitsu
- Fighting out of: Rio de Janeiro, Brazil
- Team: Team Nogueira
- Rank: 3rd degree black belt in Brazilian Jiu-Jitsu (under César "Casquinha" Guimarães)
- Years active: 2010–present

Mixed martial arts record
- Total: 21
- Wins: 12
- By knockout: 2
- By submission: 7
- By decision: 3
- Losses: 9
- By knockout: 1
- By decision: 8

Other information
- Mixed martial arts record from Sherdog

Davi Ramos (born November 5, 1986) is a Brazilian professional mixed martial artist and Brazilian jiu jitsu practitioner who competes in the Lightweight division of Absolute Championship Akhmat (ACA). He is ranked #9 in the ACA Lightweight rankings. A professional since 2010, he most notably competed in the Ultimate Fighting Championship.

== Mixed martial arts career ==
=== Early career ===
Ramos made his professional MMA debut in July 2010. Over the next six years, he amassed a record of six wins against one defeat.

=== Ultimate Fighting Championship ===
Ramos made his UFC debut on March 11, 2017, in a Welterweight bout as a replacement for Max Griffin against Sérgio Moraes at UFC Fight Night: Belfort vs. Gastelum. He lost the fight via unanimous decision.

In his second fight for the promotion, Ramos faced Chris Gruetzemacher on December 9, 2017, at UFC Fight Night: Swanson vs. Ortega. He won the fight via rear-naked choke submission in the third round.

For his third fight with the promotion, Ramos faced Nick Hein on May 12, 2018, at UFC 224. He won the fight via rear-naked choke submission in the first round.

Ramos faced John Gunther on November 10, 2018, at UFC Fight Night 139. He won the fight via a rear-naked choke in round one.

Ramos faced promotional newcomer Austin Hubbard on May 18, 2019, at UFC Fight Night 152. He won the fight via unanimous decision.

Ramos faced Islam Makhachev on September 7, 2019, at UFC 242. He lost the fight via unanimous decision.

Ramos was expected to face Arman Tsarukyan on April 11, 2020, at UFC Fight Night: Overeem vs. Harris. Due to the COVID-19 pandemic, the event was eventually postponed . The bout eventually moved to UFC Fight Night 172 on July 19, 2020. He lost the fight via unanimous decision.

After two years off not being offered a new contract and not having any bouts booked, Ramos requested and was granted a release from the UFC.

=== Absolute Championship Akhmat ===
After his release, Ramos signed with ACA, announcing that he would compete in the ACA Lightweight Grand Prix, with his first bout being against Artem Reznikov at ACA 140 on June 17, 2022. He lost the bout via unanimous decision.

Ramos faced Aurel Pîrtea on April 8, 2023, at ACA 155, winning the bout via TKO stoppage at the end of the first round.

Ramos faced Rasul Magomedov at ACA 164 on October 4, 2023, winning the bout via unanimous decision.

Ramos faced Ali Abdulkhalikov in the main event of ACA 176 on May 31, 2024. The bout which was part of the 2024 ACA Lightweight Grand Prix Quarterfinal, ended in a unanimous decision loss.

== Professional grappling career ==
Ramos competed against Pedro Marinho at F2W 177 on July 16, 2021, losing the match by unanimous decision. He returned to the promotion at F2W 182 on August 29, 2021, to face Dante Leon in the main event, although he lost this match as well.

Ramos was booked to challenge Craig Jones for the Polaris middleweight title in the main event of Polaris 17 on October 9, 2021. Ramos lost this match by decision, and Jones won the vacant title. Ramos then competed at the inaugural UFC FightPass Invitational event on December 16, 2021, where he represented Team LFA alongside Ary Farias, Gregory Rodrigues, and Rafael Lovato Jr. Ramos drew both his matches against Anton Berzin and Daniel Pineda, and his team won the tournament.

As a result of him being a former champion, Ramos was then invited to compete in the 77 kg division of the 2022 ADCC World Championship on September 17–18, 2022. He was forced to withdraw from the event due to visa issues just a days before, and was replaced by Mateusz Szczecinski.

Ramos competed against Micael Galvão in the main event of BJJ Stars 13: Vikings Edition on August 3, 2024. He lost the match on points.

Ramos was then invited to compete in the under 77 kg division at the 2024 ADCC World Championship. He was submitted by Oliver Taza in the opening round. He then entered the men's absolute division, where he lost by decision to Giancarlo Bodoni in the opening round.

== Mixed martial arts record ==
Professional record breakdown
21 matches	12 wins	9 losses
By knockout	2	1
By submission	7	0
By decision	3	8

Res.	Record	Opponent	Method	Event	Date	Round	Time	Location	Notes
Loss	12–9	Sidney Outlaw	Decision (unanimous)	ACA 201	March 27, 2026	3	5:00	Minsk, Belarus	
Loss	12–8	Ali Bagov	TKO (punches)	ACA 194	October 23, 2025	2	2:39	Dubai, United Arab Emirates	Catchweight (165 lb) bout.
Loss	12–7	Mukhamed Kokov	Decision (split)	ACA 180	October 4, 2024	3	5:00	Grozny, Russia	Catchweight (161 lb) bout; Kokov missed weight.
Loss	12–6	Ali Abdulkhalikov	Decision (unanimous)	ACA 176	May 31, 2024	5	5:00	Ufa, Russia	2023 ACA Lightweight Grand Prix Quarterfinal.
Win	12–5	Rasul Magomedov	Decision (unanimous)	ACA 164	October 4, 2023	3	5:00	Grozny, Russia	
Win	11–5	Aurel Pîrtea	TKO (punches and knee)	ACA 155	April 8, 2023	1	4:59	Minsk, Belarus	
Loss	10–5	Artem Reznikov	Decision (unanimous)	ACA 140	June 17, 2022	5	5:00	Sochi, Russia	2022 ACA Lightweight Grand Prix Quarterfinal.
Loss	10–4	Arman Tsarukyan	Decision (unanimous)	UFC Fight Night: Figueiredo vs. Benavidez 2	July 19, 2020	3	5:00	Abu Dhabi, United Arab Emirates	
Loss	10–3	Islam Makhachev	Decision (unanimous)	UFC 242	September 7, 2019	3	5:00	Abu Dhabi, United Arab Emirates	
Win	10–2	Austin Hubbard	Decision (unanimous)	UFC Fight Night: dos Anjos vs. Lee	May 18, 2019	3	5:00	Rochester, New York, United States	
Win	9–2	John Gunther	Submission (rear-naked choke)	UFC Fight Night: The Korean Zombie vs. Rodríguez	November 10, 2018	1	1:57	Denver, Colorado, United States	
Win	8–2	Nick Hein	Submission (rear-naked choke)	UFC 224	May 12, 2018	1	4:15	Rio de Janeiro, Brazil	
Win	7–2	Chris Gruetzemacher	Submission (rear-naked choke)	UFC Fight Night: Swanson vs. Ortega	December 9, 2017	3	0:50	Fresno, California, United States	Return to Lightweight.
Loss	6–2	Sérgio Moraes	Decision (unanimous)	UFC Fight Night: Belfort vs. Gastelum	March 11, 2017	3	5:00	Fortaleza, Brazil	Welterweight debut.
Win	6–1	Nick Piedmont	Decision (unanimous)	Phoenix FC 1	December 10, 2016	3	5:00	Zouk Mikael, Lebanon	
Win	5–1	Mike Flach	Submission (rear-naked choke)	RFA 42	August 19, 2016	1	4:07	Visalia, California, United States	Catchweight (159 lb) bout.
Loss	4–1	David Rickels	Decision (unanimous)	Bellator 130	October 24, 2014	3	5:00	Mulvane, Kansas, United States	Catchweight (163 lb) bout; Ramos missed weight.
Win	4–0	Claudiere Freitas	Submission (armbar)	Talent MMA Circuit 8	April 12, 2014	1	3:07	Valinhos, Brazil	
Win	3–0	José Alberto Quiñónez	TKO (punches)	Extreme Fight Academy: Mexico vs. Brazil	November 15, 2013	N/A	N/A	Tuxtla Gutiérrez, Mexico	
Win	2–0	Rony Silva	Submission (guillotine choke)	Nitrix Champion Fight 16	August 31, 2013	1	1:03	Americana, Brazil	
Win	1–0	Juan Manuel Puig	Submission	Cabo Xtreme Combat: Battle at the Beach	July 4, 2010	1	0:36	Cabo San Lucas, Mexico	Lightweight debut.
