= 2022 in Absolute Championship Akhmat =

Mixed martial arts events

Information
- First date: January 28, 2022
- Last date: December 23, 2022

Events
- Total events: 16

Fights
- Total fights: 179
- Title fights: 11

The year 2022 was the tenth year in the history of the Absolute Championship Akhmat, a mixed martial arts promotion based in Russia. 2022 will begin with ACA 135.

== List of events ==
No.	Event	Date	Venue	Location
1	ACA 135: Gasanov vs. Dzhanaev	January 28, 2022	Sports Hall Coliseum	Grozny, Russia
2	ACA 136: Bukuev vs Akopyan	February 26, 2022	CSKA Arena	Moscow, Russia
3	ACA 137: Magomedov vs. Matevosyan	March 6, 2022	Basket-Hall Krasnodar	Krasnodar, Russia
4	ACA 138: Vagaev vs Gadzhidaudov	March 27, 2022	Sports Hall Coliseum	Grozny, Russia
5	ACA 139: Vartanyan vs. Ilunga	May 21, 2022	CSKA Arena	Moscow, Russia
6	ACA 140: Ramos vs. Reznikov	June 17, 2022	WOW Arena	Sochi, Russia
7	ACA 141: Khasbulaev vs. Suleymanov	July 22, 2022	Bolshoy Ice Dome	Sochi, Russia
8	ACA 142: Gadzhidaudov vs Amagov	August 13, 2022	TatNeft Arena	Kazan, Russia
9	ACA 143: Gasanov vs Frolov	August 27, 2022	TatNeft Arena	Krasnodar, Russia
10	ACA 144: Nemchinov vs Dipchikov	September 9, 2022	Falcon Club Arena	Minsk, Belarus
11	ACA 145: Abdulaev vs. Slipenko	September 23, 2022	Sibur Arena	Saint Petersburg, Russia
12	ACA 146: Abdurahmanov vs. Pessoa	October 4, 2022	Sports Hall Coliseum	Grozny, Russia
13	ACA 147: Vartanyan vs Raisov	November 4, 2022	CSKA Arena	Moscow, Russia
14	ACA 148: Magomedov vs Olenichev	November 18, 2022	Bolshoy Ice Dome	Sochi, Russia
15	ACA 149: Vagaev vs Slipenko	December 16, 2022	Krylatskoye Sports Palace	Moscow, Russia
16	ACA 150: Koshkin vs. Reznikov	December 23, 2022	CSKA Arena	Moscow, Russia

== 2022 ACA Lightweight Grand Prix ==
The prize fund of the Grand Prix in a lightweight division will be 800.000 dollars, this was announced by the founder of the ACA league Mairbek Khasiev, with the winner of the GP getting a cash prize of $200,000.

Quarter-finals
(Brazil) Hacran Dias	5r.
(Russia) Yusuf Raisov	UD
(Democratic Republic of the Congo) Alain Ilunga	3r.
(Russia) Eduard Vartanyan	SUB
(Russia) Ali Bagov	No*
(Russia) Rashid Magomedov	Contest
(Brazil) Davi Ramos	5r.
(Kazakhstan) Artem Reznikov	UD

Semi-finals
(Russia) Yusuf Raisov	2r.
(Russia) Eduard Vartanyan	TKO
(Russia) Andrey Koshkin	2r.
(Kazakhstan) Artem Reznikov	SUB

Final
(Russia) Eduard Vartanyan	TBD
(Kazakhstan) Artem Reznikov	TBD

Participants: Alain Ilunga, Ali Bagov, Yusuf Raisov, Hacran Dias, Artem Reznikov, Eduard Vartanyan, Davi Ramos

- Rashid Magomedov and Ali Bagov fought at ACA 141. However the bout ended in a no contest due to the president of ACA stopping the bout due to inactivity. Both were eliminated from the tournament.

== ACA 135: Gasanov vs. Dzhanaev ==
ACA 135: Gasanov vs. Dzhanaev
- Promotion: Absolute Championship Akhmat
- Date: January 28, 2022
- Venue: Sports Hall Coliseum
- City: Grozny, Russia

Absolute Championship Akhmat 135: Gasanov vs. Dzhanaev was a mixed martial arts event held by Absolute Championship Akhmat on January 28, 2022 at the Sports Hall Coliseum in Grozny, Russia.

=== Background ===
The event featured a title fight for the ACA Middleweight Championship between the champion Magomedrasul Gasanov and #3 ranked Abdul-Rahman Dzhanaev as the event headliner.

A match for the vacant ACA Flyweight Championship between #2 ranked Murad Zeynulabidov and #4 ranked Imran Bukuev was planned as the event co-headliner. However, has Zeynulabidov to withdraw from the fight due to an injury suffered during his training camp. the bout was canceled.

Bonus awards:

The following fighters were awarded bonuses:

- $50,000 Performance of the Night: Magomedrasul Gasanov
- $25,000 Performance of the Night: Abdul-Rakhman Dzhanaev
- $5000 Stoppage Victory Bonuses: Tomáš Deák, Shamil Shakhbulatov

=== Results ===
ACA 135
Weight Class				Method	Round	Time	Notes
Middleweight 84 kg	(Russia) Magomedrasul Gasanov (c)	def.	(Russia) Abdul-Rakhman Dzhanaev	TKO (Doctor Stoppage)	4	5:00	For the ACA Middleweight Championship
Bantamweight 61 kg	(Russia) Rustam Kerimov	def.	(Russia) Abdul-Rakhman Dudaev	Decision (Unanimous)	3	5:00	
Flyweight 57 kg	(Russia) Rasul Albaskhanov	def.	(Brazil) Alexsandro Praia	Decision (Unanimous)	3	5:00	
Bantamweight 61 kg	(Russia) Shamil Shakhbulatov	def.	(Kazakhstan) Igor Zhirkov	Submission (Triangle Choke)	3	4:31	
Bantamweight 61 kg	(Slovakia) Tomáš Deák	def.	(Russia) Murad Kalamov	Submission (Ezekiel Choke)	1	1:49	
Preliminary Card
Flyweight 57 kg	(Russia) Azamat Pshukov	def.	(Russia) Lenar Suleimanov	TKO (Punches)	3	3:36	
Light Heavyweight 93 kg	(Russia) Adlan Ibragimov	def.	(Brazil) Carlos Eduardo	TKO (Doctor Stoppage)	1	5:00	
Featherweight 66 kg	(Russia) Zamir Aripshev	def.	(Kyrgyzstan) Bekbolot Abdylda Uulu	Decision (Unanimous)	3	5:00	
Lightweight 70 kg	(Brazil) Denis Silva	def.	(Uzbekistan) Xusanboy Atabayev	Decision (Unanimous)	3	5:00	

== ACA 136: Bukuev vs Akopyan ==
ACA 136: Bukuev vs Akopyan
- Promotion: Absolute Championship Akhmat
- Date: February 26, 2022
- City: Moscow, Russia

Absolute Championship Akhmat 136: Bukuev vs Akopyan was a mixed martial arts event held by Absolute Championship Akhmat on February 26, 2022, in Moscow, Russia.

=== Background ===
The main event was set to feature a welterweight title fight, the reigning ACA Welterweight Champion Abubakar Vagaev was set to defend his title against Ustarmagomed Gadzhidaudov. However, Vagaev has to withdraw on January 26 due to COVID-19. The bout between Imran Bukuev and Aren Akopyan was prompted to the main event of the evening, the fight was for the vacant ACA Flyweight championship. The belt was vacated when Azamat Kerefov officially announced on October 3, 2021, that he voluntarily vacated the title to try free agency.

A welterweight bout between Vitaliy Slipenko and Stefan Sekulić was scheduled as the co-main event. Sekulić stepped in as a replacement for Mark Hulme, who withdrew from the bout.

Bonus awards:

The following fighters were awarded bonuses:

- $50,000 Performance of the Night: Imran Bukuev
- $5000 Stoppage Victory Bonuses: Vitaliy Slipenko

=== Results ===
ACA 136
Weight Class				Method	Round	Time	Notes
Flyweight 57 kg	(Russia) Imran Bukuev	def.	(Russia) Aren Akopyan	Submission (Rear-Naked Choke)	2	2:18	For the vacant ACA Flyweight Championship
Welterweight 77 kg	(Ukraine) Vitaliy Slipenko	def.	(Serbia) Stefan Sekulić	TKO (Spinning Backfist and Punches)	2	4:46	
Heavyweight 120 kg	(United States) Daniel James	def.	(Estonia) Denis Smoldarev	TKO (Punches)	1	1:41	
Middleweight 84 kg	(Poland) Rafał Haratyk	def.	(Russia) Vitaliy Nemchinov	Technical Decision (Unanimous)	3	1:02	
Heavyweight 120 kg	(Russia) Adam Bogatyrev	def.	(Poland) Daniel Omielańczuk	Decision (Unanimous)	3	5:00	
Preliminary Card
Featherweight 66 kg	(Russia) Bibert Tumenov	def.	(Brazil) Diego Brandão	KO (Punch to the Body)	2	4:56	
Featherweight 66 kg	(Azerbaijan) Tural Ragimov	def.	(Brazil) Elismar Lima	Decision (Unanimous)	3	5:00	
Welterweight 77 kg	(Brazil) Irwing Machado	–	(Kyrgyzstan) Altynbek Mamashev	No Contest (Illegal Knee)	2	2:31	
Lightweight 70 kg	(Ukraine) Samvel Vardanyan	def.	(Kyrgyzstan) Zhorabek Teshabaev	Decision (Unanimous)	3	5:00	
Flyweight 57 kg	(Brazil) Josiel Silva	def.	(Ukraine) Karlen Minasyan	TKO (Doctor Stoppage)	2	5:00	
Flyweight 57 kg	(Brazil) Maycon Silvan	def.	(Kyrgyzstan) Myrzamidin Pazylov	TKO (Injury)	2	2:16	
Featherweight 66 kg	(Tajikistan) Davlat Chuponov	def.	(Russia) Mikhail Balakirev	Decision (Unanimous)	3	5:00	

== ACA 137: Magomedov vs. Matevosyan ==
ACA 137: Magomedov vs. Matevosyan
- Promotion: Absolute Championship Akhmat
- Date: March 6, 2022
- Venue: Basket-Hall Krasnodar
- City: Krasnodar, Russia

Absolute Championship Akhmat 137: Magomedov vs. Matevosyan will be a mixed martial arts event held by Absolute Championship Akhmat on March 6, 2022, at the Basket-Hall Krasnodar in Krasnodar, Russia.

=== Background ===
An ACA Heavyweight Championship bout between the reigning champion Tony Johnson Jr. and title challenger Salimgerey Rasulov was booked as the event headliner. However, after being unable to obtain a visa in time, Johnson was forced to pull out of the bout.

Bonus awards:

The following fighters were awarded bonuses:

- $50,000 Performance of the Night: Anatoliy Boyko
- $5000 Stoppage Victory Bonuses: Muslim Magomedov, Artem Frolov and Nashkho Galaev

=== Fight Card ===
ACA 137
Weight Class				Method	Round	Time	Notes
Light Heavyweight 93 kg	(Russia) Muslim Magomedov (c)	def.	(Armenia) Grigor Matevosyan	Submission (Kimura)	4	3:08	For the ACA Light Heavyweight Championship
Middleweight 84 kg	(Russia) Artem Frolov	def.	(Brazil) Rene Pessoa	TKO (Punches)	1	1:58	
Featherweight 66 kg	(Brazil) Felipe Froes	def.	(Russia) Ramazan Kishev	Decision (Unanimous)	3	5:00	
Featherweight 66 kg	(Russia) Alexey Polpudnikov	def.	(Russia) Abdul-Rakhman Temirov	Decision (Split)	3	5:00	
Lightweight 70 kg	(Russia) Bayzet Khatkhokhu	def.	(Belarus) Ilia Kadkevich	Decision (Unanimous)	3	5:00	
Preliminary Card
Middleweight 84 kg	(Russia) Murad Abdulaev	def.	(Brazil) Alfredo Souza	Decision (Unanimous)	3	5:00	
Featherweight 66 kg	(Georgia (country)) Levan Makashvili	def.	(Brazil) Leonardo Limberger	Decision (Split)	3	5:00	
Bantamweight 61 kg	(Russia) Mehdi Baydulaev	def.	(Brazil) Walter Pereira Jr.	Decision (Unanimous)	3	5:00	
Welterweight 77 kg	(Russia) Anatoliy Boyko	def.	(Russia) Khamzat Aushev	KO (Head Kick)	1	3:35	
Flyweight 57 kg	(Russia) Goga Shamatava	def.	(Brazil) Alan Gomes	Decision (Unanimous)	3	5:00	
Bantamweight 61 kg	(Russia) Nashkho Galaev	def.	(Russia) Evgeny Bondarev	KO (Knee)	2	2:00	
Lightweight 70 kg	(Russia) Khalid Satuev	def.	(Brazil) Herbert Batista	Decision (Unanimous)	3	5:00	

== ACA 138: Vagaev vs Gadzhidaudov ==
ACA 138: Vagaev vs Gadzhidaudov
- Promotion: Absolute Championship Akhmat
- Date: March 26, 2022
- Venue: Sports Hall Coliseum
- City: Grozny, Russia

Absolute Championship Akhmat 138: Vagaev vs Gadzhidaudov will be a mixed martial arts event held by Absolute Championship Akhmat on March 26, 2022, at the Sports Hall Coliseum in Grozny, Russia.

=== Background ===
Bonus awards:

The following fighters were awarded bonuses:

- $50,000 Performance of the Night: Abdul-Rakhman Dudaev
- $5000 Stoppage Victory Bonuses: Salimgerey Rasulov | Andrey Goncharov | Evertom Freitas and Chersi Dudaev

=== Fight Card ===
ACA 138
Weight Class				Method	Round	Time	Notes
Welterweight 77 kg	(Russia) Abubakar Vagaev (c)	def.	(Russia) Ustarmagomed Gadzhidaudov	Decision (Split)	5	5:00	For the ACA Welterweight Championship
Bantamweight 61 kg	(Russia) Oleg Borisov	def.	(Russia) Magomed Bibulatov (c)	Decision (Unanimous)	5	5:00	For the ACA Bantamweight Championship
Heavyweight 120 kg	(Russia) Salimgerey Rasulov	def.	(United States) Tony Johnson Jr. (c)	TKO (Punches)	1	1:40	For the ACA Heavyweight Championship
Lightweight 70 kg	(Russia) Yusuf Raisov	def.	(Brazil) Hacran Dias	Decision (Unanimous)	5	5:00	ACA Lightweight Grand Prix Quarter-finals
Preliminary Card
Featherweight 66 kg	(Russia) Abdul-Rakhman Dudaev	def.	(Russia) Rasul Mirzaev	KO (Punch)	1	4:06	
Featherweight 77 kg	(Russia) Andrey Goncharov	def.	(Belarus) Apti Bimarzaev	KO (Punches)	1	3:36	
Lightweight 70 kg	(Brazil) Evertom Freitas	def.	(Russia) Adlan Bataev	Submission (Armbar)	1	0:21	
Welterweight 77 kg	(Russia) Chersi Dudaev	def.	(Brazil) Renato Gomes	Submission (Arm-Triangle Choke)	3	3:17	
Lightweight 70 kg	(Russia) Daud Shaikhaev	def.	(Romania) Aurel Pîrtea	Decision (Unanimous)	3	5:00	
Flyweight 57 kg	(Russia) Kurban Gadzhiev	def.	(Russia) Rasul Albaskhanov	Decision (Unanimous)	3	5:00	
Early Prelim
Lightweight 70 kg	(Russia) Amirkhan Adaev	def.	(Brazil) Denis Silva	Decision (Unanimous)	3	5:00	
Welterweight 77 kg	(Russia) Magomedsaygid Alibekov	def.	(Kazakhstan) Georgy Kichigin	TKO (Punches)	2	1:06	
Flyweight 57 kg	(Tajikistan) Azam Gaforov	def.	(Kazakhstan) Saginay Shukir	Decision (Unanimous)	3	5:00	
Featherweight 66 kg	(Russia) Kurban Taigibov	def.	(Kyrgyzstan) Bakytbek Duishobaev	Decision (Unanimous)	3	5:00	
Bantamweight 61 kg	(Russia) Murad Kalamov	def.	(Brazil) Rodrigo Praia	Decision (Unanimous)	3	5:00	
Featherweight 66 kg	(Brazil) Carlos Augusto da Silva	def.	(Russia) Akhmadkhan Bokov	Decision (Unanimous)	3	5:00	

== ACA 139: Vartanyan vs. Ilunga ==
ACA 139: Vartanyan vs. Ilunga
- Promotion: Absolute Championship Akhmat
- Date: May 21, 2022
- Venue: CSKA Arena
- City: Moscow, Russia

Absolute Championship Akhmat 139: Vartanyan vs. Ilunga was a mixed martial arts event held by Absolute Championship Akhmat on May 21, 2022 at the CSKA Arena in Moscow, Russia.

=== Background ===
The event was set to feature a quarter-finals bout for the ACA Lightweight Grand Prix between Eduard Vartanyan and Luis Peña. However, Peña could not make it into Russia due to the Russian invasion of Ukraine was replaced by Alain Ilunga.

Bonus awards:

The following fighters were awarded bonuses:

- $5000 Stoppage Victory Bonuses: Eduard Vartanyan and Alexander Sarnavskiy

=== Results ===
ACA 139
Weight Class				Method	Round	Time	Notes
Lightweight 70 kg	(Russia) Eduard Vartanyan	def.	(Democratic Republic of the Congo) Alain Ilunga	Submission (Guillotine Choke)	3	3:02	ACA Lightweight Grand Prix Quarter-finals
Lightweight 70 kg	(Russia) Alexander Sarnavskiy	def.	(Brazil) Herdeson Batista	TKO (Punches)	1	0:42	
Lightweight 70 kg	(Russia) Alexander Matmuratov	def.	(Belarus) Artiom Damkovsky	Decision (Unanimous)	3	5:00	
Welterweight 77 kg	(Russia) Gadzhimurad Khiramagomedov	def.	(Brazil) Irwing Machado	Decision (Unanimous)	3	5:00	
Middleweight 84 kg	(Belarus) Vladislav Yankovsky	def.	(Russia) Mikhail Dolgov	Decision (Split)	3	5:00	
Preliminary Card
Welterweight 77 kg	(Kyrgyzstan) Tilek Mashrapov	def.	(Brazil) Elias Silvério	Decision (Split)	3	5:00	
Featherweight 66 kg	(Ukraine) Roman Ogulchanskiy	def.	(Belarus) Alexander Kovalev	Decision (Unanimous)	3	5:00	
Bantamweight 61 kg	(Brazil) Deivi Daniel Oliveira de Almeida	def.	(Georgia (country)) Vazha Tsiptauri	Decision (Split)	3	5:00	
Flyweight 57 kg	(Brazil) Charles Henrique	def.	(Armenia) German Barsegyan	TKO (Punches)	2	3:57	
Bantamweight 61 kg	(Kazakhstan) Igor Zhirkov	def.	(Russia) Nikita Chistyakov	Decision (Unanimous)	3	5:00	
Bantamweight 61 kg	(Ukraine) Aleksandr Podlesniy	def.	(Brazil) Francisco Maciel	Decision (Split)	3	5:00	
Bantamweight 61 kg	(Armenia) Ayk Kazaryan	def.	(Tajikistan) Fatkhidin Sobirov	Decision (Unanimous)	3	5:00	
Flyweight 57 kg	(Tajikistan) Osimkhon Rakhmonov	def.	(Kyrgyzstan) Erzat Nurlan Uulu	Decision (Unanimous)	3	5:00	

== ACA 140: Ramos vs. Reznikov ==
ACA 140: Ramos vs. Reznikov
- Promotion: Absolute Championship Akhmat
- Date: June 17, 2022
- Venue: WOW Arena
- City: Sochi, Russia

Absolute Championship Akhmat 140: Ramos vs. Reznikov will be a mixed martial arts event held by Absolute Championship Akhmat on June 17, 2022 at the WOW Arena in Sochi, Russia.

=== Background ===
Bonus awards:

The following fighters were awarded bonuses:

- $50,000 Performance of the Night: Vítězslav Rajnoch
- $5000 Stoppage Victory Bonuses: Mukhamed Kokov | Salamu Abdurakhmanov | Ibragim Magomedov and Selem Evloev

=== Rusults ===
ACA 140
Weight Class				Method	Round	Time	Notes
Lightweight 70 kg	(Kazakhstan) Artem Reznikov	def.	(Brazil) Davi Ramos	Decision (Unanimous)	5	5:00	ACA Lightweight Grand Prix Quarter-finals
Lightweight 70 kg	(Russia) Mukhamed Kokov	def.	(Russia) Vener Galiev	TKO (Leg Injury)	1	2:17	
Middleweight 84 kg	(Russia) Abdul-Rakhman Dzhanaev	def.	(Bulgaria) Nikola Dipchikov	Decision (Unanimous)	3	5:00	
Lightweight 70 kg	(Russia) Pavel Gordeev	def.	(Russia) Lom-Ali Nalgiev	Decision (Unanimous)	3	5:00	
Middleweight 84 kg	(Russia) Salamu Abdurakhmanov	def.	(Brazil) Ciro Rodrigues	Submission (Arm-Triangle Choke)	2	3:52	
Preliminary Card
Light Heavyweight 93 kg	(Russia) Oleg Olenichev	def.	(Russia) Amirkhan Guliev	Decision (Unanimous)	3	5:00	
Middleweight 84 kg	(Russia) Ibragim Magomedov	def.	(Brazil) Rousimar Palhares	TKO (Punches)	1	2:09	
Bantamweight 61 kg	(Russia) Akhmed Musakaev	def.	(Russia) Murad Kalamov	Decision (Unanimous)	3	5:00	
Flyweight 57 kg	(Brazil) Josiel Silva	def.	(Russia) Goga Shamatava	KO (Punch)	3	3:59	
Bantamweight 61 kg	(Russia) Maharbek Karginov	def.	(Brazil) Walter Pereira Jr.	Decision (Unanimous)	3	5:00	
Light Heavyweight 93 kg	(Brazil) Leonardo Silva	def.	(Russia) Artur Astakhov	Decision (Split)	3	5:00	
Flyweight 57 kg	(Georgia (country)) Bidzina Gavasheshvili	def.	(Kyrgyzstan) Ryskulbek Ibraimov	Decision (Unanimous)	3	5:00	
Lightweight 70 kg	(Czech Republic) Vítězslav Rajnoch	def.	(Belarus) Ilya Khodkevich	TKO (Knee and Punches)	2	3:56	
Bantamweight 61 kg	(Russia) Selem Evloev	def.	(Russia) Mikhail Pogodin	TKO (Punches)	1	4:24	

== ACA 141: Froes vs. Suleymanov ==
ACA 141: Froes vs. Suleymanov
- Promotion: Absolute Championship Akhmat
- Date: July 22, 2022
- Venue: Bolshoy Ice Dome
- City: Sochi, Russia

Absolute Championship Akhmat 141: Froes vs. Suleymanov will be a mixed martial arts event held by Absolute Championship Akhmat on July 22, 2022 at the Bolshoy Ice Dome in Sochi, Russia.

=== Background ===
Bonus awards:

The following fighters were awarded bonuses:

- $50,000 Performance of the Night: Abdul-Rakhman Dudaev
- $5000 Stoppage Victory Bonuses: Alihan Suleymanov | Islam Omarov | Adam Bogatyrev and Davlatmand Chuponov

=== Fight Card ===
ACA 141
Weight Class				Method	Round	Time	Notes
Featherweight 66 kg	(Russia) Alihan Suleymanov	def.	(Brazil) Felipe Froes	Submission (North-South Choke)	4	1:05	For the Interim ACA Featherweight Championship
Lightweight 70 kg	(Russia) Rashid Magomedov	vs.	(Russia) Ali Bagov	No Contest (Lack of Activity)	4	5:00	ACA Lightweight Grand Prix Quarter-finals
Light Heavyweight 93 kg	(Armenia) Grigor Matevosyan	def.	(Brazil) Wagner Prado	Decision (Unanimous)	3	5:00	
Featherweight 66 kg	(Russia) Abdul-Rakhman Dudaev	def.	(Brazil) John Macapá	KO (Spinning Back Fist)	1	0:44	
Welterweight 77 kg	(Russia) Andrei Koshkin	def.	(Kyrgyzstan) Altynbek Mamashov	Decision (Unanimous)	3	5:00	
Preliminary Card
Middleweight 84 kg	(Russia) Husein Kushagov	def.	(Russia) Valery Myasnikov	Decision (Unanimous)	3	5:00	
Featherweight 66 kg	(Russia) Islam Omarov	def.	(Brazil) Marcos Rodrigues	Submission (Guillotine Choke)	3	2:05	
Flyweight 57 kg	(Russia) Yunus Evloev	def.	(Brazil) Alexsandro Praia	Decision (Split)	3	5:00	
Bantamweight 61 kg	(Russia) Mehdi Baydulaev	vs.	(Russia) Islam Meshev	Decision (Unanimous)	3	5:00	
Heavyweight 120 kg	(Russia) Adam Bogatyrev	def.	(Brazil) Raphael Pessoa	TKO (Punches)	1	1:08	
Bantamweight 61 kg	(Brazil) Cleverson Silva	def.	(Ukraine) Pavel Vitruk	Decision (Split)	3	5:00	
Featherweight 66 kg	(Tajikistan) Davlatmand Chuponov	def.	(Brazil) Leonardo Limberger	Submission (Guillotine Choke)	1	1:16	

== ACA 142: Gadzhidaudov vs Amagov ==
ACA 142: Gadzhidaudov vs Amagov
- Promotion: Absolute Championship Akhmat
- Date: August 13, 2022
- Venue: TatNeft Arena
- City: Kazan, Russia

Absolute Championship Akhmat 142: Gadzhidaudov vs Amagov will be a mixed martial arts event held by Absolute Championship Akhmat on August 13, 2022 at the TatNeft Arena in Kazan, Russia.

=== Background ===
Bonus awards:

The following fighters were awarded bonuses:

- $50,000 Performance of the Night: Ruslan Abiltarov
- $5000 Stoppage Victory Bonuses: Lenar Suleymanov and Denis Silva

=== Fight Card ===
ACA 142
Weight Class				Method	Round	Time	Notes
Welterweight 77 kg	(Russia) Ustarmagomed Gadzhidaudov	def.	(Russia) Azamat Amagov	Decision (Unanimous)	5	5:00	
Featherweight 66 kg	(Georgia (country)) Levan Makashvili	def.	(Azerbaijan) Tural Ragimov	Decision (Unanimous)	3	5:00	
Flyweight 57 kg	(Russia) Lenar Suleymanov	def.	(Belarus) Andrey Kalechits	Submission (Neck Crank)	2	4:25	
Lightweight 70 kg	(Romania) Aurel Pîrtea	def.	(Russia) Ayndi Umakhanov	Submission (Guillotine Choke)	2	1:43	
Flyweight 57 kg	(Ukraine) Ruslan Abiltarov	def.	(Russia) Mansur Khatuev	Submission (Guillotine Choke)	1	2:52	
Preliminary Card
Lightweight 70 kg	(Brazil) Denis Silva	def.	(Russia) Abubakar Mestoev	Submission (Rear-Naked Choke)	2	4:24	
Middleweight 84 kg	(Russia) Mikhail Dolgov	def.	(Brazil) Irwing Machado	Decision (Unanimous)	3	5:00	
Welterweight 77 kg	(Brazil) Renato Gomes	def.	(Russia) Bay-Ali Shaipov	Decision (Unanimous)	3	5:00	

== ACA 143: Gasanov vs Frolov ==
ACA 143: Gasanov vs Frolov
- Promotion: Absolute Championship Akhmat
- Date: August 27, 2022
- Venue: Basket-Hall Krasnodar
- City: Krasnodar, Russia

Absolute Championship Akhmat 143: Gasanov vs Frolov will be a mixed martial arts event held by Absolute Championship Akhmat on August 27, 2022 at the Basket-Hall Krasnodar in Krasnodar, Russia.

=== Background ===
Bonus awards:

The following fighters were awarded bonuses:

- $50,000 Performance of the Night: Sheikh-Mansur Khabibulaev
- $5000 Stoppage Victory Bonuses: Alexey Polpudnikov | Mukhamad Vakhaev | Ramazan Kishev and Dzhaddal Alibekov

=== Fight Card ===
ACA 143
Weight Class				Method	Round	Time	Notes
Middleweight 84 kg	(Russia) Magomedrasul Gasanov (c)	def.	(Russia) Artem Frolov	Decision (Unanimous)	5	5:00	For the ACA Middleweight Championship
Heavyweight 120 kg	(Russia) Alikhan Vakhaev	def.	(Russia) Salimgerey Rasulov (c)	Decision (Unanimous)	5	5:00	For the ACA Heavyweight Championship
Featherweight 66 kg	(Russia) Alexey Polpudnikov	def.	(Russia) Abdul-Rakhman Temirov	KO (Punches)	1	1:16	
Heavyweight 120 kg	(Russia) Mukhamad Vakhaev	def.	(Estonia) Denis Smoldarev	TKO (Punches)	1	1:23	
Lightweight 70 kg	(Russia) Daud Shaikhaev	def.	(Brazil) Herdeson Batista	Decision (Unanimous)	3	5:00	
Preliminary Card
Flyweight 57 kg	(Russia) Azamat Pshukov	def.	(Brazil) Maycon Silvan	Decision (Split)	3	5:00	
Lightweight 70 kg	(Russia) Ramazan Kishev	def.	(Brazil) Evertom Freitas	TKO (Body Kick and Elbows)	1	3:52	
Flyweight 57 kg	(Kyrgyzstan) Ryskulbek Ibraimov	def.	(Brazil) Goga Shamatava	Decision (Unanimous)	3	5:00	
Lightweight 70 kg	(Russia) Bayzet Khatkhokhu	def.	(Russia) Yusup Umarov	Decision (Split)	3	5:00	
Bantamweight 61 kg	(Russia) Dzhaddal Alibekov	def.	(Tajikistan) Mukhitdin Kholov	KO (Knee and Punches)	3	0:27	
Bantamweight 61 kg	(Russia) Sheikh-Mansur Khabibulaev	def.	(Brazil) Rodrigo Praia	KO (Spinning Wheel Kick)	1	3:30	

== ACA 144: Nemchinov vs Dipchikov ==
ACA 144: Nemchinov vs Dipchikov
- Promotion: Absolute Championship Akhmat
- Date: September 9, 2022
- Venue: Falcon Club Arena
- City: Minsk, Belarus

Absolute Championship Akhmat 144: Nemchinov vs Dipchikov will be a mixed martial arts event held by Absolute Championship Akhmat on September 9, 2022 at the Falcon Club Arena in Minsk, Belarus.

=== Background ===
Bonus awards:

The following fighters were awarded bonuses:

- $5000 Stoppage Victory Bonuses: Leonardo Silva, Alexander Kovalev and Adlan Bataev

=== Fight Card ===
ACA 144
Weight Class				Method	Round	Time	Notes
Middleweight 84 kg	(Russia) Vitaliy Nemchinov	def.	(Bulgaria) Nikola Dipchikov	Decision (Unanimous)	5	5:00	
Light Heavyweight 93 kg	(Brazil) Leonardo Silva	def.	(Russia) Adlan Ibragimov	TKO (Elbows)	2	1:07	
Featherweight 66 kg	(Belarus) Alexander Kovalev	def.	(Russia) Akhmadkhan Bokov	Submission (Rear-Naked Choke)	3	4:25	
Featherweight 66 kg	(Russia) Adlan Bataev	def.	(Russia) Alexander Peduson	Submission (Rear-Naked Choke)	3	2:19	
Welterweight 77 kg	(Belarus) Viktor Makarenko	def.	(Afghanistan) Wahid Najand	KO (Spinning Backfist)	2	0:31	
Preliminary Card
Welterweight 77 kg	(Russia) Vasily Kurochkin	def.	(Russia) Arbi Aguev	Decision (Unanimous)	3	5:00	
Flyweight 57 kg	(Georgia (country)) Bidzina Gavasheshvili	def.	(Armenia) German Barsegyan	Decision (Unanimous)	3	5:00	
Welterweight 77 kg	(Belarus) Vladislav Mishkevich	def.	(Iran) Reza Ghorbankhani	Decision (Unanimous)	3	5:00	
Bantamweight 61 kg	(Georgia (country)) Vazha Tsiptauri	def.	(Russia) Magomed Ginazov	Decision (Unanimous)	3	5:00	
Featherweight 66 kg	(Russia) Zamir Aripshev	def.	(Brazil) Thales Reis	Decision (Unanimous)	3	5:00	
Lightweight 70 kg	(Russia) Khalid Satuev	def.	(Brazil) Guilherme Doin	TKO (Knee to the Body and Punches)	2	0:38	

== ACA 145: Abdulaev vs. Slipenko ==
ACA 145: Abdulaev vs. Slipenko
- Promotion: Absolute Championship Akhmat
- Date: September 23, 2022
- Venue: Sibur Arena
- City: Saint Petersburg, Russia

Absolute Championship Akhmat 145: Abdulaev vs. Slipenko will be a mixed martial arts event held by Absolute Championship Akhmat on September 23, 2022 at the Sibur Arena in Saint Petersburg, Russia.

=== Background ===
Bonus awards:

The following fighters were awarded bonuses:

- $50,000 Performance of the Night: Evgeniy Goncharov
- $5000 Stoppage Victory Bonuses: Sergey Klyuev and Kurban Taygibov

=== Fight Card ===
ACA 145
Weight Class				Method	Round	Time	Notes
Welterweight 77 kg	(Ukraine) Vitaly Slipenko	def.	(Russia) Murad Abdulaev	Decision (Unanimous)	5	5:00	
Heavyweight 120 kg	(Russia) Evgeniy Goncharov	def.	(United States) Tony Johnson Jr.	KO (Punch)	1	4:37	
Welterweight 77 kg	(Brazil) Ciro Rodrigues	def.	(Kazakhstan) Georgiy Kichigin	Decision (Unanimous)	3	5:00	
Lightweight 70 kg	(Russia) Sergey Klyuev	def.	(Russia) Musa Khamanaev	Technical Submission (Triangle Choke)	1	2:17	
Bantamweight 61 kg	(Brazil) Charles Henrique	def.	(Ukraine) Alexander Podlesniy	Decision (Unanimous)	3	5:00	
Preliminary Card
Bantamweight 66 kg	(Brazil) Francisco Maciel	def.	(Russia) Nikita Chistyakov	Decision (Split)	3	5:00	
Featherweight 66 kg	(Russia) Kurban Taygibov	def.	(Brazil) Cleverson Silva	TKO (Punches)	1	1:57	
Flyweight 66 kg	(Russia) Aren Akopyan	def.	(Kyrgyzstan) Kylymbek Altymysh uulu	Decision (Unanimous)	3	5:00	
Light Heavyweight 93 kg	(Russia) Elmar Gasanov	def.	(Russia) Evgeny Erokhin	Decision (Split)	3	5:00	

== ACA 146: Abdurahmanov vs. Pessoa ==
ACA 146: Abdurahmanov vs. Pessoa
- Promotion: Absolute Championship Akhmat
- Date: October 4, 2022
- City: Grozny, Russia

Absolute Championship Akhmat 146: Abdurahmanov vs. Pessoa will be a mixed martial arts event held by Absolute Championship Akhmat on October 4, 2022 at the in Grozny, Russia.

=== Background ===
Bonus awards:

The following fighters were awarded bonuses:

- $150,000 Performance of the Night: Abdul-Rakhman Dudaev

=== Fight Card ===
ACA 146
Weight Class				Method	Round	Time	Notes
Middleweight 84 kg	(Russia) Salamu Abdurakhmanov	def.	(Brazil) Rene Pessoa	Decision (Unanimous)	5	5:00	
Welterweight 77 kg	(Russia) Albert Tumenov	def.	(Russia) Gadzhimurad Khiramagomedov	Decision (Unanimous)	3	5:00	
Welterweight 77 kg	(Russia) Khusein Khaliev	def.	(Russia) Stanislav Vlasenko	Decision (Unanimous)	3	5:00	
Featherweight 66 kg	(Russia) Abdul-Rakhman Dudaev	def.	(Brazil) Elismar Lima	TKO (Spinning Wheel Kick and Punches)	1	0:28	
Featherweight 66 kg	(Russia) Rustam Kerimov	def.	(Brazil) Carlos Augusto da Silva	Decision (Unanimous)	3	5:00	
Preliminary Card
Featherweight 66 kg	(Russia) Akhmed Balkizov	def.	(Russia) Dzhikhad Yunusov	Decision (Unanimous)	3	5:00	
Flyweight 57 kg	(Russia) Rasul Albaskhanov	def.	(Kyrgyzstan) Almazbek Nadirov	Submission (Rear-Naked Choke)	1	3:00	
Lightweight 70 kg	(Russia) Lom-Ali Nalgiev	def.	(Democratic Republic of the Congo) Alain Ilunga	Decision (Unanimous)	3	5:00	
Bantamweight 61 kg	(Russia) Makharbek Karginov	def.	(Brazil) Daniel Oliveira	Decision (Unanimous)	3	5:00	

== ACA 147: Vartanyan vs Raisov ==
ACA 147: Vartanyan vs Raisov
- Promotion: Absolute Championship Akhmat
- Date: November 4, 2022
- Venue: CSKA Arena
- City: Moscow, Russia

Absolute Championship Akhmat 147: Vartanyan vs Raisov will be a mixed martial arts event held by Absolute Championship Akhmat on November 4, 2022 at the CSKA Arena in Moscow, Russia.

=== Background ===
Bonus awards:

The following fighters were awarded bonuses:

- $50,000 Performance of the Night: Bibert Tumenov
- $50,000 Performance of the Night: Andrey Goncharov
- $5000 Stoppage Victory Bonuses: Herbert Batista and Dzhambulat Zelimkhanov

=== Fight Card ===
ACA 147
Weight Class				Method	Round	Time	Notes
Lightweight 70 kg	(Russia) Eduard Vartanyan	def.	(Russia) Yusuf Raisov	TKO (Doctor Stoppage)	2	5:00	ACA Lightweight Grand Prix Semi-finals
Featherweight 66 kg	(Russia) Bibert Tumenov	def.	(Russia) Andrey Goncharov	Decision (Unanimous)	3	5:00	
Featherweight 66 kg	(Tajikistan) Davlatmand Chuponov	def.	(Ukraine) Roman Ogulchanskiy	TKO (Punches)	1	2:07	
Bantamweight 62 kg	(Russia) Nashkho Galaev	def.	(Russia) Albert Misikov	TKO (Doctor Stoppage)	1	5:00	
Bantamweight 62 kg	(Ukraine) Pavel Vitruk	def.	(Armenia) Ayk Kazaryan	Decision (Unanimous)	3	5:00	
Preliminary Card
Bantamweight 62 kg	(Kyrgyzstan) Ryskulbek Ibraimov	def.	(Slovakia) Tomáš Deák	TKO (Knee and Punches)	1	1:54	
Bantamweight 62 kg	(Kyrgyzstan) Alimardan Abdykaarov	def.	(Brazil) Maycon Silvan	Decision (Unanimous)	3	5:00	
Heavyweight 120 kg	(Russia) Elkhan Musaev	def.	(Brazil) Ednaldo Oliveira	Decision (Unanimous)	3	5:00	
Lightweight 71 kg	(Brazil) Herbert Batista	def.	(Kyrgyzstan) Zhorabek Tesheboev	KO (Punch)	1	2:51	
Bantamweight 62 kg	(Russia) Dzhambulat Zelimkhanov	def.	(Brazil) Walter Pereira Jr.	KO (Punch)	1	4:19	

== ACA 148: Magomedov vs Olenichev ==
ACA 148: Magomedov vs Olenichev
- Promotion: Absolute Championship Akhmat
- Date: November 18, 2022
- City: Sochi, Russia

Absolute Championship Akhmat 148: Magomedov vs Olenichev will be a mixed martial arts event held by Absolute Championship Akhmat on November 18, 2022 at the in Sochi, Russia.

=== Background ===
Bonus awards:

The following fighters were awarded bonuses:

- $50,000 Performance of the Night: Alexander Matmuratov
- $25,000 Performance of the Night: Pavel Gordeev
- $5000 Stoppage Victory Bonuses: Muslim Magomedov and Yuriy Fedorov

=== Fight Card ===
ACA 148
Weight Class				Method	Round	Time	Notes
Light Heavyweight 93 kg	(Russia) Muslim Magomedov (c)	def.	(Russia) Oleg Olenichev	TKO (Punches)	3	4:27	For the ACA Light Heavyweight Championship
Light Heavyweight 93 kg	(Armenia) Grigor Matevosyan	def.	(Brazil) Leonardo Silva	Decision (Unanimous)	3	5:00	
Lightweight 71 kg	(Russia) Alexander Matmuratov	def.	(Russia) Pavel Gordeev	Decision (Unanimous)	3	5:00	
Middleweight 84 kg	(Russia) Abdul-Rakhman Dzhanaev	def.	(Russia) Mikhail Dolgov	Decision (Unanimous)	3	5:00	
Lightweight 71 kg	(Russia) Vener Galiev	def.	(Brazil) Denis Silva	Decision (Unanimous)	3	5:00	
Preliminary Card
Welterweight 77 kg	(Russia) Viskhan Magomadov	def.	(Brazil) Renato Gomes	Decision (Unanimous)	3	5:00	
Featherweight 66 kg	(Kyrgyzstan) Nizambek Zhunusov	def.	(Russia) Sergey Klyuev	Decision (Unanimous)	3	5:00	
Bantamweight 61 kg	(Georgia (country)) Vazha Tsiptauri	def.	(Russia) Murad Kalamov	Decision (Unanimous)	3	5:00	
Heavyweight 120 kg	(Russia) Yuriy Fedorov	def.	(Democratic Republic of the Congo) Matunga Djikasa	TKO (Punches)	2	1:58	

== ACA 149: Vagaev vs Slipenko ==
ACA 149: Vagaev vs Slipenko
- Promotion: Absolute Championship Akhmat
- Date: December 16, 2022
- Venue: Basket Hall
- City: Moscow, Russia

Absolute Championship Akhmat 149: Vagaev vs Slipenko will be a mixed martial arts event held by Absolute Championship Akhmat on December 16, 2022 at the Basket Hall in Moscow, Russia.

=== Background ===
Bonus awards:

The following fighters were awarded bonuses:

- $50,000 Performance of the Night: Vitaly Slipenko
- $5000 Stoppage Victory Bonuses: Anatoliy Boyko, Rene Pessoa and Yusup Umarov

=== Fight Card ===
ACA 149
Weight Class				Method	Round	Time	Notes
Welterweight 77 kg	(Russia) Vitaly Slipenko	def.	(Russia) Abubakar Vagaev (c)	KO (Elbow)	2	0:20	For the ACA Welterweight Championship
Lightweight 71 kg	(Brazil) Herdeson Batista	def.	(Russia) Amirkhan Adaev	TKO (Punches)	1	4:50	
Featherweight 66 kg	(Russia) Kurban Taygibov	def.	(Georgia (country)) Levan Makashvili	Decision (Unanimous)	3	5:00	
Lightweight 71 kg	(Brazil) Hacran Dias	def.	(Romania) Aurel Pîrtea	Decision (Unanimous)	3	5:00	
Preliminary Card
Welterweight 77 kg	(Russia) Anatoliy Boyko	def.	(Brazil) Rousimar Palhares	TKO (Punches)	1	3:52	
Bantamweight 61 kg	(Brazil) Josiel Silva	def.	(Russia) Islam Meshev	KO (Punch)	1	0:44	
Middleweight 84 kg	(Brazil) Rene Pessoa	def.	(Belarus) Vladislav Yankovskiy	TKO (Punches)	3	4:03	
Lightweight 71 kg	(Russia) Yusup Umarov	def.	(Czech Republic) Vítězslav Rajnoch	TKO (Punches)	3	0:31	
Featherweight 66 kg	(Brazil) Marcos Rodrigues	def.	(Azerbaijan) Tural Ragimov	Decision (Unanimous)	3	5:00	
Flyweight 57 kg	(Russia) Mansur Khatuev	def.	(Belarus) Andrey Kalechits	KO (Punches)	1	4:36	
Featherweight 66 kg	(Brazil) Carlos Augusto da Silva	def.	(Belarus) Alexander Kovalev	Decision (Unanimous)	3	5:00	
Bantamweight 61 kg	(Russia) Selem Evloev	def.	(Russia) Nikita Chistyakov	Decision (Unanimous)	3	5:00	

== ACA 150: Koshkin vs. Reznikov ==
ACA 150: Koshkin vs. Reznikov
- Promotion: Absolute Championship Akhmat
- Date: December 23, 2022
- Venue: CSKA Arena
- City: Moscow, Russia

Absolute Championship Akhmat 150: Koshkin vs. Reznikov will be a mixed martial arts event held by Absolute Championship Akhmat on December 23, 2022 at the CSKA Arena in Moscow, Russia.

=== Background ===
Bonus awards:

The following fighters were awarded bonuses:

- $50,000 Performance of the Night: Beslan Ushukov
- $5000 Stoppage Victory Bonuses: Artem Reznikov | Gadzhimurad Khiramagomedov | Felipe Froes | Ali Kadyrov | Nikola Dipchikov and Astemir Nagoev

=== Fight Card ===
ACA 150
Weight Class				Method	Round	Time	Notes
Lightweight 70 kg	(Kazakhstan) Artem Reznikov	def.	(Russia) Andrey Koshkin	Submission (North-South Choke)	2	1:27	ACA Lightweight Grand Prix Semi-finals
Heavyweight 120 kg	(Russia) Evgeniy Goncharov	def.	(Russia) Mukhamad Vakhaev	Decision (Unanimous)	3	5:00	
Bantamweight 61 kg	(Russia) Magomed Bibulatov	def.	(Brazil) Charles Henrique	Decision (Split)	3	5:00	
Flyweight 57 kg	(Tajikistan) Azam Gaforov	def.	(Russia) Azamat Pshukov	KO (Punch)	2	2:28	Gaforov missed weight (58.9 kg)
Middleweight 84 kg	(Russia) Gadzhimurad Khiramagomedov	def.	(Brazil) Ciro Rodrigues	TKO (Punches)	3	2:43	
Preliminary Card
Welterweight 77 kg	(Russia) Khusein Khaliev	def.	(Brazil) Vinicius Cruz	Decision (Split)	3	5:00	
Lightweight 70 kg	(Brazil) Felipe Froes	def.	(Russia) Bayzet Khatkhokhu	TKO (Body Kick and Punches)	1	1:31	
Lightweight 70 kg	(Russia) Ali Kadyrov	def.	(Russia) Islam Akbarov	TKO (Punches)	1	3:00	
Middleweight 84 kg	(Russia) Beslan Ushukov	def.	(Brazil) Irwing Machado	KO (Spinning Wheel Kick)	2	1:16	
Middleweight 84 kg	(Bulgaria) Nikola Dipchikov	def.	(Russia) Azamat Amagov	KO (Punch)	2	0:23	
Catchweight 72 kg	(Russia) Adlan Bataev	def.	(Brazil) Evertom Freitas	Decision (Unanimous)	3	5:00	
Bantamweight 61 kg	(Russia) Astemir Nagoev	def.	(Russia) Akhmadkhan Elmurzaev	Submission (Ninja Choke)	2	0:22	

== See also ==
- List of current ACA fighters
- 2022 in UFC
- 2022 in Bellator MMA
- 2022 in ONE Championship
- 2022 in Konfrontacja Sztuk Walki
- 2022 in Rizin Fighting Federation
- 2022 in LUX Fight League
- 2022 in AMC Fight Nights
- 2022 in Brave Combat Federation
- 2022 in Road FC
- 2022 Professional Fighters League season
- 2022 in Eagle Fighting Championship
- 2022 in Legacy Fighting Alliance
