= Tor Troéng =

Swedish mixed martial arts fighter

- Born: January 25, 1983 (age 43); Umeå, Sweden
- Other names: The Hammer
- Nationality: Swedish
- Height: 6 ft 2 in (1.88 m)
- Weight: 185 lb (84 kg; 13.2 st)
- Division: Middleweight
- Reach: 77 1/2 in (197 cm)
- Style: Brazilian Jiu-Jitsu
- Stance: Orthodox
- Fighting out of: Umeå, Sweden
- Team: Allstars Training Center; Alliance MMA; Renyi Fight Camp
- Years active: 2005 – 2014

Mixed martial arts record
- Total: 24
- Wins: 16
- By knockout: 6
- By submission: 6
- By decision: 4
- Losses: 7
- By submission: 2
- By decision: 5
- Draws: 1

Other information
- Mixed martial arts record from Sherdog

Tor Troéng (born January 25, 1983) is a retired Swedish mixed martial artist previously fighting as a Middleweight for the Ultimate Fighting Championship. He was a member FX's The Ultimate Fighter: Team Jones vs. Team Sonnen.

== Early life ==
Troéng started to train martials arts in his hometown of Umeå, Sweden at the age of 9, starting doing MMA when he was 16. Troéng went to Umeå University, where he earned a master's degree in Engineering Physics.

== Mixed martial arts career ==
=== Early career ===
After going 6 amateur-fights 2001–2004, Troéng started doing MMA as a professional in 2005 mostly fighting in smaller promotions in Sweden and other parts of Europe. Since Troéng didn't have a manager at the time, he accepted every fight that he was offered, even against opponents that was considered to be way above him in the ranks, which was leading to him being an underdog in a lot of his fights. Despite all this, by 2012 he had racked up a record of 15-4-1 (11-1-1 in his last 13 fights) with a victory over UFC veteran Mark Weir and fights against notable opponents like Mamed Khalidov, Lucio Linhares, former UFC title challenger Thales Leites and Pride veteran Daniel Acácio. Troéng is considered one of the best middleweight mixed martial artists to come out of Sweden and Scandinavia.

=== The Ultimate Fighter ===
In January 2013, it was announced that Troéng was selected for The Ultimate Fighter: Team Jones vs. Team Sonnen. To get into the TUF house, Troéng defeated Scott Rosa by submission (rear-naked choke). During the choosing of teams, he was the fourth pick of Chael Sonnen for Team Sonnen and seventh overall. He faced Josh Samman in the preliminary round. He lost the fight by KO.

=== Ultimate Fighting Championship ===
Troéng made his UFC debut against castmate Adam Cella on April 6, 2013, at UFC on Fuel TV 9. He won the fight via submission due to a rear naked choke in the first round.

Troéng fought Rafael Natal on September 4, 2013, at UFC Fight Night: Teixeira vs. Bader. Early in the second round Troeng was knocked down by a huge right hand followed up by some ground and pound from Natal, but was able to survive and recover from it. He lost by unanimous decision. The performance earned him Fight of the Night honors along with Natal.

Troéng was expected to face TUF 17 castmate Robert McDaniel on March 15, 2014, at UFC 171. But he was later forced to withdraw from the bout due to a shoulder injury and was replaced by Sean Strickland.

Troéng faced Trevor Smith on July 19, 2014, at UFC Fight Night 46. He lost the fight by unanimous decision.

Troéng faced Krzysztof Jotko on October 4, 2014, at UFC Fight Night: Nelson vs. Story. He lost the fight by unanimous decision.

After his loss to Jotko, Troéng retired from MMA competition.

== Personal life ==
Troéng has a master's degree in Engineering physics and he is still working part-time doing research in mathematics, at the University of Umeå.

After retiring from his own fighting career, Troéng has since taken the role as a fight promoter. In doing so he has brought back the Swedish organisation Battle of Botnia, which he fought for himself in 2009 and 2011, and which had been inactive for about four years. The first event under the organisation's new promotion, and the fifth in total count, took place on November 28, 2015, at Battle of Botnia 2015, in Troéng's hometown of Umeå. The event was headlined by Troéng's former training partner, UFC veteran Niklas Bäckström, and the card did also feature up and coming fighters from Troéng's own gym, Renyi Fight Camp.

== Championships and accomplishments ==
=== Mixed martial arts ===
- Ultimate Fighting Championship
  - Fight of the Night (One time) vs Rafael Natal

== Mixed martial arts record ==
Professional record breakdown
24 matches	16 wins	7 losses
By knockout	6	0
By submission	6	2
By decision	4	5
Draws	1	

Res.	Record	Opponent	Method	Event	Date	Round	Time	Location	Notes
Loss	16–7–1	Krzysztof Jotko	Decision (unanimous)	UFC Fight Night: Nelson vs. Story	October 4, 2014	3	5:00	Stockholm, Sweden	
Loss	16–6–1	Trevor Smith	Decision (unanimous)	UFC Fight Night: McGregor vs. Brandao	19 July 2014	3	5:00	Dublin, Ireland	
Loss	16–5–1	Rafael Natal	Decision (unanimous)	UFC Fight Night: Teixeira vs. Bader	4 September 2013	3	5:00	Belo Horizonte, Brazil	Fight of the Night
Win	16–4–1	Adam Cella	Submission (rear-naked choke)	UFC on Fuel TV: Mousasi vs. Latifi	6 April 2013	1	3:11	Stockholm, Sweden	
Win	15–4–1	Mats Nilsson	Decision (unanimous)	The Zone FC 10	6 May 2012	3	5:00	Gothenburg, Sweden	
Win	14–4–1	Andre Reinders	KO (punch)	Gladiator Championship Fighting 7 - Redemption	3 December 2011	1	3:17	Prague, Czech Republic	
Win	13–4–1	Tomas Kuzela	Submission (rear-naked choke)	Battle of Botnia 4	24 September 2011	2	4:05	Umeå, Sweden	
Win	12–4–1	Robert Jocz	Decision (unanimous)	Superior Challenge 7	30 April 2011	3	5:00	Stockholm, Sweden	
Loss	11–4–1	Thales Leites	Submission (rear-naked choke)	Superior Challenge 6	29 October 2010	2	3:33	Stockholm, Sweden	
Win	11–3–1	Rafael Silva	Submission (triangle choke)	Superior Challenge 5	1 May 2010	3	2:44	Stockholm, Sweden	
Win	10–3–1	Matt Thorpe	Submission (kimura)	Battle of Botnia 2	12 December 2009	1	4:02	Umeå, Sweden	
Win	9–3–1	Mark Weir	Submission (triangle choke)	Superior Challenge 4	31 October 2009	3	2:05	Stockholm, Sweden	
Win	8–3–1	Bruno Silva	TKO (punches)	Battle of Botnia	2 May 2009	1	1:24	Umeå, Sweden	
Draw	7–3–1	Mikko Suvanto	Draw	FinnFight 10	6 December 2008	3	5:00	Turku, Finland	
Win	7–3	Nic Osei	TKO (punches)	Rumble of The Kings	31 October 2008	2	1.11	Luleå, Sweden	
Win	6–3	Jacek Buczko	Submission (rear-naked choke)	Baltic Storm 3	20 April 2008	2	2:10	Gdańsk, Poland	
Win	5–3	Rodney Moore	Decision (unanimous)	Superior Challenge 1	5 April 2008	3	5:00	Stockholm, Sweden	
Loss	4–3	Daniel Acacio	Decision	Fight Festival 23	15 March 2008	3	5:00	Helsinki, Finland	
Win	4–2	Fatih Balci	TKO (doctor stoppage)	The Zone FC 1	9 February 2008	1	2:19	Stockholm, Sweden	
Loss	3–2	Lucio Linhares	Decision (split)	Shooto Finland – Chicago Collision 3	17 November 2007	2	5:00	Lahti, Finland	
Loss	3–1	Mamed Khalidov	Submission (triangle choke)	Full Contact Prestige 3 – Khalidov vs. Troeng	25 February 2007	1	4:47	Poznań, Poland	
Win	3–0	Fernando Soares	TKO (strikes)	European Vale Tudo 7 - Rebels	21 October 2006	1	1:47	Stockholm, Sweden	
Win	2–0	Matti Makela	Decision (unanimous)	Shooto Sweden - Tantogarden	3 September 2006	2	5:00	Stockholm, Sweden	
Win	1–0	Muhammed Misagi	TKO (punches)	Cage Challenge 1	2 April 2005	2	2:10	Gothenburg, Sweden	
