= UFC Fight Night: Nelson vs. Story =

UFC mixed martial arts event in 2014

- The poster for UFC Fight Night: Nelson vs. Story
- Promotion: Ultimate Fighting Championship
- Date: October 4, 2014
- Venue: Ericsson Globe Arena
- City: Stockholm, Sweden
- Attendance: 10,026
- Total gate: $1.1 million

Event chronology
UFC 178: Johnson vs. Cariaso	UFC Fight Night: Nelson vs. Story	UFC Fight Night: MacDonald vs. Saffiedine

UFC Fight Night: Nelson vs. Story (also known as UFC Fight Night 53) was a mixed martial arts event held on October 4, 2014, at Ericsson Globe Arena in Stockholm, Sweden.

== Background ==
This event was the third event that the UFC hosted in Stockholm, Sweden, following UFC on Fuel TV: Gustafsson vs. Silva which took place in 2012 and UFC on Fuel TV: Mousasi vs. Latifi in 2013.

The event was headlined by a welterweight bout between Gunnar Nelson and Rick Story.

Amir Sadollah was briefly scheduled to face Nico Musoke at the event. However, Sadollah was pulled from the pairing with Musoke in favor of a bout with Yoshihiro Akiyama on September 20, 2014 at UFC Fight Night 52. Musoke faced Alexander Yakovlev

Chan Sung Jung was expected to face Akira Corassani at the event. However, Jung pulled out of the bout citing a strained shoulder and was replaced by Max Holloway.

Robert Whiteford was expected to face Dennis Siver at the event. However, Whiteford pulled out of the bout and was replaced by promotional newcomer Taylor Lapilus. In turn, the Swedish Mixed Martial Arts Federation deemed Lapilus an unsuitable opponent and Charles Rosa was chosen to face Siver.

This event Featured the UFC Debut of Future Light Heavyweight Champion Jan Błachowicz

== Results ==
Fight card (UFC Fight Pass)
Weight class				Method	Round	Time	Notes
Welterweight	Rick Story	def.	Gunnar Nelson	Decision (split) (47–48, 49–46, 50–44)	5	5:00
Featherweight	Max Holloway	def.	Akira Corassani	TKO (punches)	1	3:11
Light Heavyweight	Jan Błachowicz	def.	Ilir Latifi	TKO (body kick and punches)	1	1:58
Featherweight	Mike Wilkinson	def.	Niklas Bäckström	KO (punches)	1	1:19
Preliminary card (UFC Fight Pass)
Middleweight	Magnus Cedenblad	def.	Scott Askham	Decision (unanimous) (29–28, 29–28, 29–28)	3	5:00
Welterweight	Nico Musoke	def.	Alexander Yakovlev	Decision (unanimous) (30–27, 30–27, 30–27)	3	5:00
Featherweight	Dennis Siver	def.	Charles Rosa	Decision (unanimous) (30–27, 30–27, 30–27)	3	5:00
Welterweight	Cathal Pendred	def.	Gasan Umalatov	Decision (split) (29–28, 28–29, 29–28)	3	5:00
Middleweight	Krzysztof Jotko	def.	Tor Troéng	Decision (unanimous) (30–27, 30–26, 30–27)	3	5:00
Lightweight	Mairbek Taisumov	def.	Marcin Bandel	TKO (punches)	1	1:01
Featherweight	Zubaira Tukhugov	def.	Ernest Chavez	TKO (punches)	1	4:21

== Bonus awards ==
The following fighters received $50,000 bonuses:

- Fight of the Night: Dennis Siver vs. Charles Rosa
- Performance of the Night: Mike Wilkinson and Max Holloway

== See also ==
- List of UFC events
- 2014 in UFC
