= Mike Wilkinson (fighter) =

English mixed martial arts fighter

- Born: 15 September 1987 (age 39); England
- Other names: The Warrior
- Nationality: English
- Height: 5 ft 8 in (1.73 m)
- Weight: 155 lb (70 kg; 11.1 st)
- Division: Lightweight; Featherweight
- Reach: 66.0
- Stance: Orthodox
- Fighting out of: Leigh, Wigan, England
- Team: Atherton Submission Wrestling
- Years active: 2009 – present

Mixed martial arts record
- Total: 14
- Wins: 9
- By knockout: 3
- By submission: 4
- By decision: 2
- Losses: 5
- By knockout: 1
- By submission: 2
- By decision: 2

Other information
- Mixed martial arts record from Sherdog
- Last updated on: November 25, 2013

Mike Wilkinson (born 15 September 1987) is an English mixed martial artist who most recently competed in the Lightweight division. A professional competitor since 2009, he has competed for the UFC, Absolute Championship Berkut, and was a competitor on The Ultimate Fighter: The Smashes.

== Mixed martial arts career ==
=== The Ultimate Fighter ===
In September 2012 it was announced that Wilkinson was selected for The Ultimate Fighter: The Smashes.

Wilkinson had his first fight against Grant Blackler of the Australian team. Wilkinson defeated Blackler in the first round via submission. Leading up to his next fight in the tournament, which was set to be against Colin Fletcher, Wilkinson was injured in training and was replaced by Australian Richie Vaculik. Wilkinson was still given a chance to earn a UFC contract at the Finale.

=== Ultimate Fighting Championship ===
Despite getting injured leading up to his second fight on The Ultimate Fighter: The Smashes, Wilkinson was given a fight in the UFC. He faced Brendan Loughnane at UFC on FX 6. Wilkinson was victorious via unanimous decision.

Wilkinson next fought Rony Jason at UFC on Fuel TV 10. Jason defeated Wilkinson by technical submission due to a triangle choke in the first round, giving Wilkinson his first professional MMA loss.

After more than a year out of action, Wilkinson returned to the octagon on 4 October 2014 at UFC Fight Night: Nelson vs. Story and fought Niklas Bäckström. In a significant upset, Wilkinson won the fight via KO due to punches in the first round. The win also earned him his first Performance of the Night bonus award.

Wilkinson was expected to face Alan Omer on 20 June 2015 at UFC Fight Night 69. However, Wilkinson suffered a shoulder injury and was removed from the card.

Wilkinson faced Makwan Amirkhani on 27 February 2016 at UFC Fight Night 84. He lost the fight by unanimous decision and was subsequently released from the promotion.

=== Absolute Championship Berkut ===
Wilkinson faced Soso Nizharadze on 15 July 2015 at ACB 41. He lost the fight via unanimous decision.

Wilkinson faced Brendan Loughnane on 11 March 2017 at ACB 53. He lost the fight via TKO in the first round.

== Bare-knuckle boxing ==
Wilkinson is scheduled to make his debut with Bare Knuckle Fighting Championship against Luke Brassfield on 30 May 2026 at BKFC 90. However, Wilkinson withdrew for undisclosed reasons and was replaced by Kris Trezise.

== Championships and accomplishments ==
=== Mixed martial arts ===
- Ultimate Fighting Championship
  - Performance of the Night (One time)
  - UFC.com Awards
    - 2014: Ranked #9 Knockout of the Year vs. Niklas Backstrom

== Mixed martial arts record ==
Professional record breakdown
14 matches	9 wins	5 losses
By knockout	3	1
By submission	4	2
By decision	2	2

Res.	Record	Opponent	Method	Event	Date	Round	Time	Location	Notes
Loss	9–5	David Martinez	Submission (rear-naked choke)	Eternal MMA 42	23 March 2019	3	4:17	Queensland, Australia	Lightweight bout.
Loss	9–4	Brendan Loughnane	KO (knee and punches)	ACB 54: Supersonic	11 March 2017	1	2:30	Manchester, England	
Loss	9–3	Soso Nizharadze	Decision (unanimous)	ACB 41: The Path to Triumph	15 July 2016	3	5:00	Sochi, Russia	
Loss	9–2	Makwan Amirkhani	Decision (unanimous)	UFC Fight Night: Silva vs. Bisping	27 February 2016	3	5:00	London, England	
Win	9–1	Niklas Bäckström	KO (punches)	UFC Fight Night: Nelson vs. Story	4 October 2014	1	1:19	Stockholm, Sweden	Performance of the Night.
Loss	8–1	Rony Jason	Technical Submission (triangle choke)	UFC on Fuel TV: Nogueira vs. Werdum	8 June 2013	1	1:24	Fortaleza, Brazil	Featherweight debut.
Win	8–0	Brendan Loughnane	Decision (unanimous)	UFC on FX: Sotiropoulos vs. Pearson	15 December 2012	3	5:00	Gold Coast, Australia	
Win	7–0	Brian Moore	Decision (unanimous)	OMMAC 12: Bad Vibes	12 November 2011	3	5:00	Liverpool, England	
Win	6–0	Artem Lobov	TKO (punches)	Raw 1: Enter Colosseum	11 September 2011	2	3:52	Liverpool, England	
Win	5–0	Uche Ihiekwe	TKO (punches)	OMMAC 9: Enemies	5 March 2011	1	4:13	Liverpool, England	
Win	4–0	Craig Allen	Submission (rear-naked choke)	Fight Stars 7	14 November 2010	1	N/A	Rotherham, England	
Win	3–0	Ali Maclean	Submission (rear-naked choke)	OMMAC 5: Showdown	5 June 2010	2	1:32	Liverpool, England	
Win	2–0	Neil Spring	Submission (rear-naked choke)	OMMAC 4: Victorious	6 March 2010	1	3:42	Liverpool, England	
Win	1–0	Tom Clarke	Submission (armbar)	OMMAC 1: Assassins	8 August 2009	1	4:18	Liverpool, England	

== See also ==
- List of male mixed martial artists
