= Tom Niinimäki =

Finnish mixed martial artist

- Born: July 25, 1982 (age 44); Turku, Finland
- Other names: Stoneface
- Nationality: Finnish
- Height: 5 ft 9 in (175 cm)
- Weight: 145 lb (66 kg; 10 st 5 lb)
- Division: Featherweight
- Reach: 69.0 in (175 cm)
- Style: Submission wrestling
- Fighting out of: Boca Raton, Florida, United States
- Team: Finnfighters Gym; Blackzilians
- Trainer: Wrestling: Ari Heikiö; Boxing: Sampo Pänttäjä; Strength training: Vesa Vuori
- Rank: Purple belt in Brazilian Jiu-Jitsu
- Years active: 2002–2017 (MMA)

Mixed martial arts record
- Total: 31
- Wins: 22
- By knockout: 7
- By submission: 8
- By decision: 7
- Losses: 8
- By knockout: 1
- By submission: 5
- By decision: 2
- Draws: 1

Other information
- Mixed martial arts record from Sherdog

Tom Niinimäki (born July 25, 1982) is a Finnish professional mixed martial artist who formerly competed in the Featherweight division of the Ultimate Fighting Championship.

== Mixed martial arts career ==
=== Early career ===
Niinimäki began training in kickboxing at the age of 15, and mixed martial arts at 19. He made his professional MMA debut in October 2002 in his native Finland. He assembled an impressive record of 9–2 in the first two years of competition, with all but one of his wins coming by way of submission or TKO.

Beginning in 2005, Niinimäki hit a rough patch where he lost three fights in a row. After one more win in 2007, he retired from competition, saying that he had "lost his fire" to compete.

After a two and a half year hiatus, Niinimäki returned to the sport in February 2010. Since his return he has been unbeaten and maintained an 11-fight winning streak before signing with the Ultimate Fighting Championship.

=== Ultimate Fighting Championship ===
Niinimäki made his promotional debut against Rani Yahya on November 30, 2013, at The Ultimate Fighter 18 Finale. He won the fight via split decision.

Niinimäki was expected to face Thiago Tavares on May 31, 2014, at UFC Fight Night 41. However, on May 14, Tavares pulled out of the fight due to thigh injury and was replaced by Niklas Bäckström. Niinimäki lost the back-and-forth fight in the first round by submission.

Niinimäki next faced Chas Skelly on August 23, 2014, at UFC Fight Night 49. He lost the fight via submission in the first round.

On November 7, 2014, Niinimäki announced that he had signed a new four-fight contract with UFC.

Niinimäki was expected to face Rony Jason on December 20, 2014, at UFC Fight Night 58. However, Jason pulled out of the bout on December 10 and was replaced by promotional newcomer Renato Moicano. Niinimäki lost the bout via submission in the second round.

On January 27, 2015, MMAFighting.com reported that Niinimäki had been released from his UFC contract along with four other fighters.

=== Post-UFC career ===
In late April 2016, Niinimäki was announced as one of the fighters that had signed on with new European promotion European Fighting Challenge.

== Personal life ==
Before moving to Boca Raton, Florida, Niinimäki lived his entire life in Turku, Finland and worked as a bouncer in several nightclubs.

== Management and sponsors ==
In the early 2012, Niinimäki signed a two-year management contract with Authentic Sports Management. After closing the deal, the management rapidly sent Niinimäki to train at Imperial Athletics gym with a mixed martial arts group later known as Blackzilians. In January 2014, Niinimäki moved to Florida to be able to continue training with Blackzilians at Jaco Hybrid Training Center.

In May 2014, online gambling company Unibet announced a sponsor deal with Niinimäki.

== Championships and accomplishments ==
=== Wrestling ===
- International Federation of Associated Wrestling Styles
  - 2011: 1st place - European Championships Grappling No Gi (155 lbs)
  - 2011: 3rd place - European Championships Grappling No Gi (165 lbs)
  - 2010: 3rd place - European Championships Grappling No Gi (155 lbs)
  - 2010: 1st place - European Championships Combat Grappling (155 lbs)

=== Mixed martial arts ===
- Cage
  - Featherweight Champion
- TurkuFight
  - Featherweight Champion
- Nordic MMA Awards - MMAviking.com
  - 2013 Fighter of the Year

== Mixed martial arts record ==
Professional record breakdown
31 matches	22 wins	8 losses
By knockout	7	1
By submission	8	5
By decision	7	2
Draws	1	

Res.	Record	Opponent	Method	Event	Date	Round	Time	Location	Notes
Win	22–8–1	Jonathan Brookins	Decision (unanimous)	Euro FC 1	October 1, 2016	3	5:00	Espoo, Finland	
Loss	21–8–1	Renato Moicano	Submission (rear-naked choke)	UFC Fight Night: Machida vs. Dollaway	December 20, 2014	2	3:30	Barueri, Brazil	
Loss	21–7–1	Chas Skelly	Submission (rear-naked choke)	UFC Fight Night: Henderson vs. dos Anjos	August 23, 2014	1	2:35	Tulsa, Oklahoma, United States	
Loss	21–6–1	Niklas Bäckström	Submission (bulldog choke)	UFC Fight Night: Munoz vs. Mousasi	May 31, 2014	1	4:15	Berlin, Germany	
Win	21–5–1	Rani Yahya	Decision (split)	The Ultimate Fighter 18 Finale	November 30, 2013	3	5:00	Las Vegas, Nevada, United States	
Win	20–5–1	Walel Watson	Submission (kimura)	Cage 23	September 21, 2013	2	2:52	Vantaa, Finland	Defended Cage Featherweight Championship
Win	19–5–1	Chase Beebe	Decision (unanimous)	Cage 22	May 11, 2013	3	5:00	Vantaa, Finland	Defended Cage Featherweight Championship
Win	18–5–1	Vladimir Karasiov	Submission (guillotine choke)	Cage 20: Northern Storm 2	November 17, 2012	1	1:31	Oulu, Finland	Defended Cage Featherweight Championship
Win	17–5–1	Brian Pearman	Submission (rear-naked choke)	TFC 23: Fight for the Troops	June 15, 2012	2	3:48	Fort Riley, Kansas, United States	
Win	16–5–1	Johnny Frachey	KO (punch)	Cage 16: 1st Defense	October 8, 2011	1	1:09	Espoo, Finland	Defended Cage Featherweight Championship
Win	15–5–1	Sergej Grecicho	Decision (unanimous)	Cage 14: All Stars	November 20, 2010	3	5:00	Espoo, Finland	Won Cage Featherweight Championship
Win	14–5–1	Dave Hill	Decision (unanimous)	TF 2: Champions are Here	October 23, 2010	3	5:00	Turku, Finland	Won TurkuFight Featherweight Championship
Win	13–5–1	Ben Boekee	Submission (kimura)	Cage 13: Spring Break	May 8, 2010	1	3:47	Vantaa, Finland	
Win	12–5–1	Yunus Evloev	Submission (kimura)	TF: Resurrection	April 3, 2010	1		Turku, Finland	
Win	11–5–1	Lautaro Arborelo	Submission (rear-naked choke)	Cage 12: Champions are Born	February 28, 2010	2	1:26	Vantaa, Finland	
Win	10–5–1	Bogdan Cristea	Decision (unanimous)	CW 7: Scotland The Brave	August 4, 2007	3	5:00	Glasgow, Scotland	
Loss	9–5–1	Tristan Yunker	Submission (rear-naked choke)	IHC 11: Apocalypse	November 18, 2006	1	1:34	Vantaa, Finland	
Loss	9–4–1	Hatsu Hioki	Technical Submission (armbar)	Shooto 2005: 11/6 in Korakuen Hall	November 6, 2005	1	3:03	Tokyo, Japan	
Loss	9–3–1	Danny Batten	Decision (majority)	CWFC: Strike Force 2	July 16, 2005	5	5:00	Coventry, England	
Draw	9–2–1	Bendy Casimir	Draw	Shooto Sweden: Second Impact	March 14, 2005	2	5:00	Stockholm, Sweden	
Win	9–2	Andre Soares	Decision (unanimous)	Cage Warriors 9: Xtreme Xmas	December 18, 2004	3	5:00	Sheffield, England	
Win	8–2	Patrick Rahael	TKO	FF 8: FinnFight 8	November 26, 2004			Turku, Finland	
Win	7–2	Vincent Latoel	TKO	Shooto Finland: Ragnarok	October 24, 2004	2	2:25	Tampere, Finland	
Win	6–2	Carlos Carrasco	Submission (rear-naked choke)	Shooto: Switzerland 2	September 4, 2004	1		Zurich, Switzerland	
Win	5–2	Vincent Latoel	Submission (triangle Choke)	Shooto Finland: Capital Punishment 2	April 5, 2004	2	2:03	Helsinki, Finland	
Win	4–2	Ville Honkala	TKO	FF 7: FinnFight 7	November 1, 2003	1	8:39	Turku, Finland	
Win	3–2	Teemu Nurkkala	TKO (injury)	FF 7: FinnFight 7	November 1, 2003	1	0:15	Turku, Finland	
Loss	2–2	Mikael Lahdesmäki	Decision (unanimous)	Shooto Finland: Capital Punishment	September 15, 2003	2	5:00	Helsinki, Finland	
Loss	2–1	Per Eklund	TKO (punches)	FF 6: FinnFight 6	November 30, 2002	1	3:53	Turku, Finland	
Win	2–0	Janne Salminen	KO (knees)	FF 6: FinnFight 6	November 30, 2002	1	0:32	Turku, Finland	
Win	1–0	Mikael Lahdesmäki	TKO (corner stoppage)	Shooto Finland: The First Time	October 19, 2002	1	5:00	Turku, Finland	
