= UFC Fight Night: Muñoz vs. Mousasi =

UFC mixed martial arts event in 2014

- The poster for UFC Fight Night: Muñoz vs. Mousasi
- Promotion: Ultimate Fighting Championship
- Date: May 31, 2014
- Venue: O2 World
- City: Berlin, Germany
- Attendance: 8,000

Event chronology
UFC 173: Barão vs. Dillashaw	UFC Fight Night: Muñoz vs. Mousasi	The Ultimate Fighter Brazil 3 Finale: Miocic vs. Maldonado

UFC Fight Night: Muñoz vs. Mousasi (also known as UFC Fight Night 41) was a mixed martial arts event held on May 31, 2014, at O2 World in Berlin, Germany.

== Background ==
The event was the first that the organization had hosted in Berlin, and third in Germany following UFC 99 and UFC 122 in 2009 and 2010.

The event was the first of two that took place on May 31, 2014, with The Ultimate Fighter Brazil 3 Finale: Miocic vs. Maldonado being the other making it only the second time in UFC history that they have hosted two events in one day.

The card was headlined by a middleweight bout between Gegard Mousasi and Mark Muñoz.

Thiago Tavares was expected to face Tom Niinimäki at the event. However, Tavares pulled out of the bout citing an injured thigh and was replaced by promotional newcomer Niklas Bäckström.

The octagon's canvas was exceptionally lacking sponsor logos, due to the Berlin event's canvas having been unintentionally shipped to São Paulo's event.

== Results ==
Main Card (UFC Fight Pass)
Weight class				Method	Round	Time	Notes
Middleweight	Gegard Mousasi	def.	Mark Muñoz	Submission (rear-naked choke)	1	3:57
Middleweight	C. B. Dollaway	def.	Francis Carmont	Decision (unanimous) (30–27, 30–27, 29–28)	3	5:00
Middleweight	Sean Strickland	def.	Luke Barnatt	Decision (split) (28–29, 30–27, 29–28)	3	5:00
Featherweight	Niklas Bäckström	def.	Tom Niinimäki	Submission (rear-naked choke)	1	4:15
Preliminary card (UFC Fight Pass)
Lightweight	Nick Hein	def.	Drew Dober	Decision (unanimous) (29–28, 30–27, 29–28)	3	5:00
Middleweight	Magnus Cedenblad	def.	Krzysztof Jotko	Submission (guillotine choke)	2	4:59
Bantamweight	Iuri Alcântara	def.	Vaughan Lee	TKO (punches)	1	0:25
Welterweight	Peter Sobotta	def.	Pawel Pawlak	Decision (unanimous) (30–27, 30–27, 30–27)	3	5:00
Featherweight	Maximo Blanco	def.	Andy Ogle	Decision (unanimous) (29–28, 29–28, 29–28)	3	5:00
Heavyweight	Ruslan Magomedov	def.	Viktor Pešta	Decision (unanimous) (29–28, 29–28, 29–28)	3	5:00

== Bonus awards ==
The following fighters received $50,000 bonuses:

- Fight of the Night: None awarded
- Performance of the Night: Magnus Cedenblad, Niklas Bäckström, C. B. Dollaway and Gegard Mousasi

== See also ==
- List of UFC events
- 2014 in UFC
