= 2017 in Absolute Championship Berkut =

Mixed martial arts events

Information
- First date: January 13, 2017
- Last date: December 23, 2017

Events
- Total events: 37
- Kickboxing: 4
- BJJ: 6

The year 2017 was the fifth year in the history of the Absolute Championship Berkut, a mixed martial arts and kickboxing promotion based in Russia.

== List of events ==
ACB MMA
#	Event title	Date	Arena	Location
1	ACB 51: Silva vs. Torgeson	January 13, 2017	Bren Events Center	(United States) Irvine, California, USA
2	ACB 52: Another Level of MMA Fighting	January 21, 2017	Hallmann dome	Vienna, Austria
3	ACB 53: Young Eagles 15	February 18, 2017	Hala Urania	Olsztyn, Poland
4	ACB 54: Supersonic	March 11, 2017	Manchester Arena	Manchester, England
5	ACB 55: Dushanbe	March 24, 2017	Tax Committee Sports Center	Dushanbe, Tajikistan
6	ACB 56: Young Eagles 16	April 1, 2017	Prime hall	Minsk, Belarus
7	ACB 57: Payback	April 15, 2017	Luzhniki Palace of Sports	Moscow, Russia
8	ACB 58: Young Eagles 17	April 22, 2017	Gamid Gamidov Palace of Sports	Khasavyurt, Russia
-	ACB 59: Young Eagles 18	April 29, 2017 (Cancelled)	Palace of sports "Manege"	Vladikavkaz, Russia
9	ACB 60: Aguev vs. Devent	May 13, 2017	Hallmann dome	Vienna, Austria
10	ACB 61: Balaev vs. Bataev	May 20, 2017	Sibur Arena	Saint Petersburg, Russia
11	ACB 59: Young Eagles 18	May 25, 2017	Sports Hall Coliseum	Grozny, Russia
12	ACB 62: Stepanyan vs. Cruz	June 17, 2017	KSK "Ekspress"	Rostov-on-Don, Russia
13	ACB 63: Celiński vs. Magalhaes	July 1, 2017	Ergo Arena	Gdańsk, Poland
14	ACB 64: Young Eagles 19	July 19, 2017	Antalya Arena Spor Salonu	Antalya, Turkey
15	ACB 65: Silva vs. Agnaev	July 22, 2017	Sheffield Arena	Sheffield, England
16	ACB 66: Young Eagles 20	August 5, 2017	Sports Hall Coliseum	Grozny, Russia
17	ACB 67: Cooper vs. Berkhamov	August 19, 2017	Sports Hall Coliseum	Grozny, Russia
18	ACB 68: Young Eagles 21	August 26, 2017	Tax Committee Sports Center	Dushanbe, Tajikistan
19	ACB 69: Young Eagles 22	September 9, 2017	Almaty Arena	Almaty, Kazakhstan
20	ACB 70: The Battle of Britain	September 23, 2017	Sheffield Arena	Sheffield, England
21	ACB 71: Yan vs. Mattos	September 30, 2017	Dynamo Sports Palace	Moscow, Russia
22	ACB 72: Makovsky vs. Sherbatov	October 14, 2017	Tohu	Montreal, Quebec, Canada
23	ACB 73: Silva vs. Makoev	October 21, 2017	Miécimo da Silva Sports Complex	Rio de Janeiro, Brazil
24	ACB 74: Aguev vs. Townsend	November 18, 2017	Wiener Stadthalle	Vienna, Austria
25	ACB 75: Gadzhidaudov vs. Zieliński	November 25, 2017	Carl Benz Arena	Stuttgart, Germany
26	ACB 76: Young Eagles 23	December 9, 2017	Gold Coast Convention and Exhibition Centre	Gold Coast, Australia
27	ACB 77: Abdulvakhabov vs. Vartanyan	December 16, 2017	Luzhniki Palace of Sports	Moscow, Russia

ACB KB
#	Event title	Date	Arena	Location
1	ACB KB 9: Showdown in Paris	March 25, 2017	Palais des Sports Marcel-Cerdan	Paris, France
2	ACB KB 10: Russia vs. China	July 15, 2017	Izmailovo Sports Palace	Moscow, Russia
3	ACB KB 11 / Wu Lin Feng	October 7, 2017	Henan TV Studio 8	Zhengzhou, China
4	ACB KB 12: Warriors Of Light	November 10, 2017	Marriott Congress Center	(United States) Los Angeles, California, USA

ACB BJJ
#	Event title	Date	Arena	Location
1	ACB BJJ 4: WGP 75 KG/85 KG	February 25, 2017	Santiago Canyon College	(United States) Orange, California, USA
2	ACB BJJ 5: WGP 95 KG/95+ KG	May 6, 2017	OSiR Włochy	Warsaw, Poland
3	ACB BJJ 6: WGP 60 KG/65 KG	July 16, 2017	Dynamo Sports Palace	Moscow, Russia
4	ACB BJJ 7: WGP 75 KG/85 KG	September 9, 2017	Riocentro	Rio de Janeiro, Brazil
5	ACB BJJ 8: WGP 65 KG/95+ KG	October 28, 2017	Ali Bin Hamad al-Attiyah Arena	Doha, Qatar
6	ACB BJJ 9: WGP 60 KG/95 KG	December 9, 2017	Dynamo Sports Palace	Moscow, Russia

== ACB 51: Silva vs. Torgeson ==
ACB 51: Silva vs. Torgeson
- Promotion: Absolute Championship Berkut
- Date: January 13, 2017
- Venue: Bren Events Center
- City: (United States) Irvine, California, USA
- Attendance: ~ 500

Event chronology
ACB 50	ACB 51: Silva vs. Torgeson	ACB 52

Absolute Championship Berkut 51: Silva vs. Torgeson was a mixed martial arts event held by Absolute Championship Berkut on January 13, 2017, at the Bren Events Center in Irvine, California United States.

=== Background ===
This event featured a world title fight for the vacant ACB Light Heavyweight Championship between Thiago Silva and Jared Ferguson as headliner.

A Heavyweight bout between Michał Andryszak and Mike Kyle was scheduled for this card. However, the fight was cancelled due to visa problem sustained by Andryszak.

Bonus awards:

The following fighters were awarded $10,000 bonuses:

- Fight of the Night: Kyle Reyes vs. Mario Israel
- Knockout of the Night: Arthur Estrázulas

=== Result ===
ACB 51
Weight Class				Method	Round	Time	Notes
Light Heavyweight 93 kg	(Brazil) Thiago Silva	def.	(United States) Jared Torgeson	Decision (Unanimous)	3	5:00	For the ACB Light Heavyweight Championship.
Featherweight 66 kg	(Peru) Luis Palomino	def.	(Russia) Musa Khamanaev	TKO (Punches)	2	3:35	
Lightweight 70 kg	(United States) Christos Giagos	def.	(Brazil) Alexandre Pimentel	Decision (Unanimous)	3	5:00	
Lightweight 70 kg	(Brazil) Leandro Silva	def.	(United States) Pat Healy	TKO (Punches)	1	0:38	
Heavyweight 120 kg	(United States) Mike Kyle	def.	(United States) Dan Charles	TKO (Punches)	1	2:15	
Light Heavyweight 93 kg	(Russia) Shamil Gamzatov	def.	(United States) Rodney Wallace	Decision (Split)	3	5:00	
Preliminary Card
Lightweight 70 kg	(Brazil) Arthur Estrázulas	def.	(United States) Dave Courchaine	KO (Punches)	1	3:55	
Bantamweight 61 kg	(United States) Terrion Ware	def.	(United States) Nick Mamalis	Decision (Unanimous)	3	5:00	
Welterweight 70 kg	(Cuba) Guillerme Martinez	def.	(Mexico) Ivan Castillo	Decision (Unanimous)	3	5:00	
Bantamweight 61 kg	(Guam) Kyle Reyes	def.	(Brazil) Mario Israel	Decision (Majority)	3	5:00	
Flyweight 57 kg	(United States) Danny Martinez	def.	(United States) Cory Alexander	Decision (Unanimous)	3	5:00	

== ACB 52: Another Level of MMA Fighting ==
ACB 52: Another Level of MMA Fighting
- Promotion: Absolute Championship Berkut
- Date: January 21, 2017
- Venue: Hallmann dome
- City: Vienna, Austria
- Attendance: ~ 2,000

Event chronology
ACB 51	ACB 52: Another Level of MMA Fighting	ACB 53

Absolute Championship Berkut 52: Another Level of MMA Fighting was a mixed martial arts event held by Absolute Championship Berkut on January 21, 2017, at the Hallmann dome in Vienna, Austria.

=== Background ===
6 fighters from Russia, who were to perform at the ACB 52 tournament in Vienna, have not been able to participate due to visa problems.

The fight between Patrik Kincl and Arbi Agujev was originally a 2nd-round TKO win by Kincl. The fight was overturned in a No Contest by the ACB official, because the referee stopped the fight too soon.

The fight between João Luis Nogueira and Shamil Nikaev was originally a unanimous decision win by Nogueira. The judges decision was Overturned in a No Contest by the ACB official.

Bonus awards:

The following fighters were awarded $10,000 bonuses:

- Knockout of the Night: Ismail Naurdiev
- Submission of the Night: Matjaz Vicar

=== Result ===
ACB 52
Weight Class				Method	Round	Time	Notes
Welterweight 77 kg	(Czech Republic) Patrik Kincl	vs.	(Austria) Arbi Agujev	No Contest (Overturned)	1	4:42	Originally a 2nd-round TKO win by Kincl.
Heavyweight 120 kg	(Poland) Michał Andryszak	def.	(Estonia) Denis Smoldarev	KO (Knee)	1	3:18	
Lightweight 70 kg	(Brazil) João Luis Nogueira	vs.	(Russia) Shamil Nikaev	No Contest (Overturned)	3	5:00	Originally a unanimous decision win by Nogueira.
Middleweight 84 kg	(Bulgaria) Nikola Dipchikov	def.	(Slovakia) Alexander Takacs	KO (Knee)	1	4:19	
Welterweight 70 kg	(Austria) Erhan Kartal	def.	(Brazil) Rubenilton Pereira	Decision (Unanimous)	3	5:00	
Welterweight 70 kg	(Austria) Ismail Naurdiev	def.	(Romania) Andrei Vasinca	TKO (Knee and Punches)	1	1:28	
Catchweight 74 kg	(Slovenia) Matjaz Vicar	def.	(Russia) Khamzat Musaev	Submission (Armbar)	1	4:46	
Light Heavyweight 93 kg	(France) Malik Merad	def.	(Romania) Cristian Mitrea	TKO (Punches)	1	4:31	
Light Heavyweight 93 kg	(Turkmenistan) Dovletdzhan Yagshimuradov	def.	(Germany) Daniel Könecke	TKO (Knee and Punches)	2	2:44	
Bantamweight 61 kg	(England) Niko Gjoka	def.	(Brazil) Paulo de Sousa	Decision (Unanimous)	3	5:00	

== ACB 53: Young Eagles 15 ==
ACB 53: Young Eagles 15
- Promotion: Absolute Championship Berkut
- Date: February 18, 2017
- Venue: Hala Urania
- City: Olsztyn, Poland
- Attendance: ~ 2,000

Event chronology
ACB 52	ACB 53: Young Eagles 15	ACB 54

Absolute Championship Berkut 53: Young Eagles 15 was a mixed martial arts event held by Absolute Championship Berkut on February 18, 2017, at the Hala Urania in Olsztyn, Poland.

=== Background ===
Bonus awards:

The following fighters were awarded $5,000 bonuses:

- Fight of the Night: Pawel Kielek vs Bai-Ali Shaipov
- Knockout of the Night: Dmitriy Shestakov
- Submission of the Night: Mehdi Baydulaev

=== Result ===
ACB 53
Weight Class				Method	Round	Time	Notes
Lightweight 70 kg	(Poland) Adrian Zieliński	def.	(Russia) Rasul Yakhyaev	Decision (Unanimous)	3	5:00	
Middleweight 84 kg	(Poland) Piotr Strus	def.	(Russia) Michail Tsarev	TKO (Doctor Stoppage)	2	5:00	
Light Heavyweight 93 kg	(Poland) Karol Celiński	def.	(Poland) Łukasz Parobiec	TKO (Punches)	3	4:06	
Lightweight 70 kg	(Russia) Bai-Ali Shaipov	def.	(Poland) Paweł Kiełek	Decision (Unanimous)	3	5:00	
Welterweight 77 kg	(Russia) Ibragim Tibilov	def.	(Lithuania) Mindaugas Veržbickas	Submission (Rear Naked Choke)	3	1:05	
Featherweight 66 kg	(Russia) Lambert Akhiadov	def.	(Poland) Rafał Czechowski	Decision (Unanimous)	3	5:00	
Lightweight 70 kg	(Russia) Aslambek Arsamikov	def.	(Poland) Łukasz Szczerek	Decision (Unanimous)	3	5:00	
Featherweight 66 kg	(Russia) Mehdi Baidulaev	def.	(France) Suleiman Bouhata	Submission (Rear Naked Choke)	2	2:47	
Featherweight 66 kg	(Russia) Dukvaha Astamirov	def.	(Poland) Jakub Wikłacz	TKO (Punches)	2	4:58	
Welterweight 77 kg	(Russia) Dzhokhar Duraev	def.	(Poland) Patryk Wołodkiewicz	TKO (Knees and Punches)	2	4:50	
Preliminary Card
Bantamweight 61 kg	(Russia) Adlan Mamaev	def.	(Lithuania) Vytautas Sadauskas	Decision (Unanimous)	3	5:00	
Lightweight 70 kg	(Poland) Maciej Kaliciński	def.	(Russia) Muslim Abdulaev	TKO (Punches)	2	2:59	
Welterweight 77 kg	(Russia) Umar Gaisumov	def.	(Poland) Paweł Karwowski	KO (Punch)	1	2:16	
Featherweight 66 kg	(Russia) Dmitriy Shestakov	def.	(Russia) Mansur Arsakhanov	KO (Spinning Heel Kick)	1	1:40	
Flyweight 57 kg	(Russia) Shamil Akhmaev	def.	(Poland) Kamil Unruh	Decision (Split)	3	5:00	

== ACB 54: Supersonic ==
ACB 54: Supersonic
- Promotion: Absolute Championship Berkut
- Date: March 11, 2017
- Venue: Manchester Arena
- City: Manchester, England
- Attendance: ~10,000

Event chronology
ACB 53	ACB 54: Supersonic	ACB 55

Absolute Championship Berkut 54: Supersonic was a mixed martial arts event held by Absolute Championship Berkut on March 11, 2017, at the Manchester Arena in Manchester, England.

=== Background ===
This event featured a Champion vs. Champion fight between The KSW Middleweight Champion Mamed Khalidov and the Venator FC Middleweight Champion Luke Barnatt as headliner, Also the event was originally scheduled to be co-headlined by a welterweight title fight between Brett Cooper and Aslambek Saidov. However, on February 14, it was announced that Cooper had to withdraw from his first title defense due to serious health issues. Saidov has faced ACB newcomer Ion Pascu. Lightweight Pat Healy and light heavyweight Vinny Magalhaes both suffered injuries in the lead up to the event, and they will no longer participate in the event.

Bonus awards:

The following fighters were awarded $10,000 bonuses:

- Fight of the Night: Joshua Aveles vs. Amirkhan Adaev
- Knockout of the Night: Brendan Loughnane
- Submission of the Night: Ali Bagov

=== Result ===
ACB 54
Weight Class				Method	Round	Time	Notes
Middleweight 84 kg	(Poland) Mamed Khalidov	def.	(England) Luke Barnatt	KO (Punches)	1	0:21	
Featherweight 66 kg	(England) Brendan Loughnane	def.	(England) Mike Wilkinson	KO (Knee and Punches)	1	2:30	
Welterweight 77 kg	(Russia) Aslambek Saidov	def.	(Romania) Ion Pascu	Decision (Unanimous)	3	5:00	
Lightweight 70 kg	(Romania) Aurel Pîrtea	def.	(England) Saul Rogers	Submission (Guillotine Choke)	2	0:53	
Catchweight 72.5 kg	(Russia) Ali Bagov	def.	(United States) Bubba Jenkins	Submission (Inverted Triangle Choke)	2	4:01	
Lightweight 70 kg	(United States) Joshua Aveles	def.	(Russia) Amirkhan Adaev	Decision (Split)	3	5:00	Originally announced as a draw.
Light Heavyweight 93 kg	(Russia) Batraz Agnaev	def.	(Sweden) Max Nunes	TKO (Punches)	1	2:57	
Middleweight 84 kg	(Russia) Abdul-Rakhman Dzhanaev	def.	(Poland) Adam Zając	TKO (Doctor Stoppage)	2	2:50	
Middleweight 84 kg	(England) Andy DeVent	def.	(England) Danny Mitchell	TKO (Punches)	1	0:35	
Catchweight 63 kg	(Russia) Murad Kalamov	def.	(England) Niko Gjoka	Submission (Triangle Choke)	2	4:11	
Lightweight 70 kg	(England) Kane Mousah	def.	(England) Lewis Monarch	Decision (Unanimous)	3	5:00	
Bantamweight 61 kg	(England) Dean Garnett	def.	(Australia) Michael Tobin	KO (Spinning Kick)	2	0:31	
Middleweight 84 kg	(Turkey) Ibragim Chuzhigaev	def.	(United States) David Mitchell	TKO (Punches)	3	0:45	
Featherweight 66 kg	(Scotland) Robert Whiteford	def.	(United States) Nam Phan	Submission (Standing Guillotine Choke)	1	0:21	
Heavyweight 120 kg	(Russia) Mukhomad Vakhaev	def.	(Canada) Tanner Boser	Decision (Split)	3	5:00	
Bantamweight 61 kg	(England) Shoaib Yousaf	def.	(England) Javonne Morrison	TKO (Head Kick and Punches)	1	3:24	
Preliminary Card
Featherweight 66 kg	(Wales) Azi Thomas	def.	(England) Eden Newton	TKO (Punches)	1	N/A	
Lightweight 70 kg	(Scotland) Chris Bungard	def.	(Scotland) Iain Feenan	Submission (Flying Triangle Choke)	1	2:41	
Lightweight 70 kg	(England) Ashley Reece	def.	(England) James Lewis	TKO (Punches)	2	2:43	
Catchweight 60 kg	(Wales) Aaron Aby	def.	(England) Connor Hignett	Decision (Split)	3	5:00	
Middleweight 84 kg	(England) Gaz Corran	def.	(England) Shaun Hampton	Decision (Unanimous)	3	5:00	
Middleweight 84 kg	(England) Jenaid Ebanks	def.	(Poland) Marcin Prostko	Submission (Rear-Naked Choke)	2	N/A	
Catchweight 63.5 kg	(England) Call Ellenor	def.	(England) Declan Williams	Submission (Rear-Naked Choke)	1	N/A	

== ACB 55: Dushanbe ==
ACB 55: Dushanbe
- Promotion: Absolute Championship Berkut
- Date: March 24, 2017
- Venue: Tax Committee Sports Center
- City: Dushanbe, Tajikistan

Event chronology
ACB 54	ACB 55: Dushanbe

Absolute Championship Berkut 55: Dushanbe was a mixed martial arts event held by Absolute Championship Berkut on March 24, 2017, at the Tax Committee Sports Center in Dushanbe, Tajikistan.

=== Background ===
Gamzat Khiramagomedov was injured during the preparation for his fight and was forced to withdraw from his match against Will Noland.

Evgeniy Lazukov was injured and couldn't participate in his Fight against Muin Gafurov, and was subsequently replaced by Georgian fighter Beno Adamia.

Donald Sanchez and Abdul-Rahman Temirov has to withdraw due to injury, Yusuf Raisov and valdines Silva will now face each other in the co-main event of the evening.

Bonus awards:

The following fighters were awarded $10,000 bonuses:

- Fight of the Night: Shakhbulatov vs. Macek
- Submission of the Night: Igor Fernandes
- ACB League Founder Bonus : Mukhamed Berkhamov

=== Result ===
ACB 55
Weight Class				Method	Round	Time	Notes
Welterweight 77 kg	(Russia) Mukhamed Berkhamov	def.	(Russia) Sharaf Davlatmurodov	Submission (Armbar)	2	2:44	
Featherweight 66 kg	(Russia) Yusuf Raisov	def.	(Brazil) Valdines Silva	Submission (Arm-Triangle Choke)	1	2:28	
Welterweight 77 kg	(Russia) Denis Kanakov	def.	(Tajikistan) Faizy Tobatov	TKO (Doctor Stoppage)	1	5:00	
Welterweight 77 kg	(Russia) Sergey Khandozhko	def.	(Russia) Stanislav Vlasenko	Decision (Split)	3	5:00	
Bantamweight 61 kg	(Tajikistan) Muin Gafurov	def.	(Georgia (country)) Beno Adamia	TKO (Punches)	1	2:46	
Welterweight 77 kg	(Russia) Imran Abaev	def.	(Kyrgyzstan) Erkinbek Mansurov	Submission (Kimura)	2	2:18	
Middleweight 84 kg	(Russia) Grachik Bozinyan	def.	(Russia) Shamil Abdulkhalikov	Submission (Triangle Choke)	1	1:40	
Lightweight 70 kg	(Ukraine) Oleg Khachaturov	def.	(Tajikistan) Iftikhor Arbobov	TKO (Punches)	3	2:21	
Welterweight 77 kg	(Brazil) Igor Fernandes	def.	(Russia) Rustam Gadzhiev	Submission (Anaconda Choke)	1	4:47	
Bantamweight 61 kg	(Tajikistan) Fatkhidin Sobirov	def.	(Kazakhstan) Denis Mutsnek	Decision (Unanimous)	3	5:00	
Bantamweight 61 kg	(Russia) Shamil Shakhbulatov	def.	(Czech Republic) Filip Macek	Decision (Unanimous)	3	5:00	
Featherweight 66 kg	(Japan) Taichi Nakajima	def.	(Russia) Radzhabali Fayzidini	Submission (Kimura)	2	3:41	
Welterweight 77 kg	(Tajikistan) Mubaraksho Mubarakshoev	def.	(Russia) Denis Tiuliulin	Submission (Rear Naked Choke)	2	2:23	

== ACB KB 9: Showdown in Paris ==
ACB KB 9: Showdown in Paris
- Promotion: Absolute Championship Berkut
- Date: March 25, 2017
- Venue: Palais des Sports Marcel-Cerdan
- City: Paris, France

Event chronology
ACB 55	ACB KB 9: Showdown in Paris

Absolute Championship Berkut Kickboxing 9: Showdown in Paris was a kickboxing event held by Absolute Championship Berkut on March 25, 2017, at the Palais des Sports Marcel-Cerdan in Paris, France.

=== Result ===
ACB KB 9
Weight Class				Method	Round	Time	Notes
KB Lightweight 70 kg	(Belarus) Chingiz Allazov	def.	(Morocco) Mohamed Hendouf	Decision (Unanimous)	3	3:00	
KB Welterweight 77 kg	(France) Cyril Benzaquen	def.	(Russia) Alexander Stetsurenko	Decision (Unanimous)	3	3:00	
KB Featherweight 65 kg	(France) Eddy Nait Slimani	def.	(Spain) David Mejia	Decision (Unanimous)	3	3:00	
KB Super Heavyweight	(Netherlands) Dexter Suisse	def.	(France) Abdarhmane Coulibaly	Decision (Unanimous)	3	3:00	
KB Welterweight 77 kg	(Belarus) Yury Bessmertny	def.	(France) Djibril Ehouo	Decision (Unanimous)	3	3:00	
KB Lightweight 70 kg	(China) Song Shaoqiu	def.	(Romania) Ștefan Irimia	Decision (Unanimous)	3	3:00	
KB Welterweight 77 kg	(France) Gary Anad	def.	(Russia) Mansur Vaduev	Decision (Split)	3	3:00	
KB Featherweight 65 kg	(France) Cédrick Peynaud	def.	(Belgium) Dino Kacar	Decision (Unanimous)	3	3:00	
KB Featherweight 65 kg	(Armenia) Hamayak Avetisyan	def.	(Russia) Zubaira Suleimanov	Decision (Unanimous)	3	3:00	
KB Featherweight 65 kg	(France) Célestin Mendes	def.	(Suriname) Gordon Kalaykhan	Decision (Unanimous)	3	3:00	
KB Lightweight 70 kg	(France) Fouad Jebbari	def.	(France) Kichima Yattabare	Decision (Unanimous)	3	3:00	

== ACB 56: Young Eagles 16 ==
ACB 56: Young Eagles 16
- Promotion: Absolute Championship Berkut
- Date: April 1, 2017
- Venue: Prime Hall
- City: Minsk, Belarus
- Attendance: ~ 1,500

Event chronology
ACB 55	ACB 56: Young Eagles 16	ACB 57

Absolute Championship Berkut 56: Young Eagles 16 was a mixed martial arts event held by Absolute Championship Berkut on April 1, 2017, in Minsk, Belarus.

Bonus awards:

The following fighters were awarded $5,000 bonuses:

- Fight of the Night: Odintsov vs. Elzhurkaev
- Submission of the Night: Andrey Krasnikov
- Knockout of the Nights: Nashkho Galaev

=== Result ===
ACB 56
Weight Class				Method	Round	Time	Notes
Middleweight 84 kg	(Poland) Maciej Różański	def.	(Belarus) Dmitry Voitov	Submission (Rear Naked Choke)	2	3:34	
Flyweight 57 kg	(Russia) Kurban Gadzhiev	def.	(Brazil) José Maria Tomé	Decision (Unanimous)	3	5:00	
Middleweight 84 kg	(Belarus) Igor Litoshik	vs.	(Ukraine) Idris Gezalov	Submission (Standing Guillotine Choke)	2	1:38	
Welterweight 77 kg	(Russia) Shamkhan Barakhanov	def.	(Ukraine) Anatoly Safronov	Decision (Unanimous)	3	5:00	
Bantamweight 61 kg	(Russia) Kharon Orzumiev	def.	(Georgia (country)) Soso Nizharadze	TKO (Punches)	1	3:25	
Lightweight 70 kg	(Belarus) Mikhail Odintsov	def.	(Russia) Amir Elzhurkaev	Decision (Unanimous)	3	5:00	
Featherweight 66 kg	(Ukraine) Andrey Krasnikov	def.	(Russia) Saikhan Dzhabrailov	Submission (Triangle Choke)	1	3:03	
Featherweight 66 kg	(Russia) Magomed Sulumov	def.	(Belarus) Sergei Semizhon	Decision (Unanimous)	3	5:00	
Bantamweight 61 kg	(Russia) Nashkho Galaev	def.	(Moldova) Mihail Sîrbu	KO (Knee)	1	4:07	
Bantamweight 61 kg	(Russia) Islam Yunusov	def.	(Ukraine) Aleksandr Lunga	Decision (Unanimous)	3	5:00	
Featherweight 66 kg	(Slovakia) Ľudovít Klein	def.	(Russia) Khusein Maltsagov	KO (Knee)	2	3:28	
Lightweight 70 kg	(Russia) Alibek Akhazaev	def.	(Belarus) Vitaly Ulich	Decision (Unanimous)	3	5:00	
Lightweight 70 kg	(Russia) Adam Aliev	def.	(Ukraine) Vladislav Stepanov	Decision (Unanimous)	3	5:00	
Featherweight 66 kg	(Russia) Dzhabir Vazirkhanov	def.	(Belarus) Vladislav Novitskiy	KO (Slam)	1	2:45	
Featherweight 66 kg	(Belarus) Igor Chemyakin	def.	(Russia) Ramzan Dukaev	TKO (Punches)	3	4:48	

== ACB 57: Payback ==
ACB 57: Payback
- Promotion: Absolute Championship Berkut
- Date: April 15, 2017
- Venue: Luzhniki Palace of Sports
- City: Moscow, Russia
- Attendance: ~ 10,000

Event chronology
ACB 56	ACB 57: Payback	ACB 58

Absolute Championship Berkut 57: Payback was a mixed martial arts event held by Absolute Championship Berkut on April 15, 2017, at the Luzhniki Palace of Sports in Moscow, Russia.

=== Background ===
This event featured the highly anticipated rematch for the ACB Bantamweight Championship between Magomed Magomedov and Petr Yan as headliner.

The title fight between Abdul-Aziz Abdulvakhabov and. Andrey Koshkin is off. The Bout will be Rescheduled to ACB 61 due to Abdulvakhabov knee injury.

Matheus Mattos will replace Tural Ragimov in fight against Magomed Ginazov.

Albert Duraev is out due to Illness, Ibragim Chuzhigaev will step in as a short notice replacement against Vyacheslav Vasilevsky.

Konstantin Erokhin is out due to injury, Georgy Sakaev will step in as a short notice replacement against Azamat Murzakanov.

Bonus awards:

The following fighters were awarded $10,000 bonuses:

- Fight of the Night: Ginazov vs. Mattos
- Submission of the Night: Mukhamed Kokov

=== Result ===
ACB 57
Weight Class				Method	Round	Time	Notes
Bantamweight 61 kg	(Russia) Petr Yan	def.	(Russia) Magomed Magomedov (c)	Decision (Unanimous)	5	5:00	For the ACB Bantamweight Championship
Lightweight 70 kg	(Russia) Eduard Vartanyan	def.	(Russia) Alexander Sarnavskiy	Submission (Rear Naked Choke)	2	4:47	
Middleweight 84 kg	(Russia) Vyacheslav Vasilevsky	def.	(Turkey) Ibragim Chuzhigaev	Submission (Rear Naked Choke)	2	3:20	
Lightweight 70 kg	(Russia) Ustarmagomed Gadzhidaudov	def.	(Russia) Rasul Shovhalov	Decision (Unanimous)	3	5:00	
Flyweight 57 kg	(Russia) Rasul Albaskhanov	def.	(Ukraine) Ruslan Abiltarov	Decision (Split)	3	5:00	
Light Heavyweight 93 kg	(Russia) Azamat Murzakanov	def.	(Russia) Georgy Sakaev	TKO (Punches)	1	1:36	
Preliminary Card
Bantamweight 61 kg	(Brazil) Matheus Mattos	def.	(Russia) Magomed Ginazov	Decision (Unanimous)	3	5:00	
Featherweight 66 kg	(Russia) Mukhamed Kokov	def.	(Armenia) Akop Stepanyan	Submission (Kimura)	3	0:51	
Light Heavyweight 93 kg	(Russia) Maxim Futin	def.	(Russia) Isa Umarov	KO (Punch to the Body)	2	3:46	
Featherweight 66 kg	(Russia) Alexander Peduson	def.	(Russia) Rasul Ediev	Submission (Guillotine Choke)	1	1:41	
Featherweight 66 kg	(Russia) Rustam Asuev	def.	(Peru) David Cubas	Decision (Unanimous)	3	5:00	
Welterweight 70 kg	(Russia) Ramazan Kuramagomedov	def.	(Japan) Yukinori Akazawa	KO (Kick to the Body)	1	2:09	

== ACB 58: Young Eagles 17 ==
ACB 58: Young Eagles 17
- Promotion: Absolute Championship Berkut
- Date: April 22, 2017
- Venue: Gamid Gamidov Palace of Sports
- City: Khasavyurt, Russia
- Attendance: ~ 4,000

Event chronology
ACB 57	ACB 58: Young Eagles 17	ACB 60

Absolute Championship Berkut 58: Young Eagles 17 was a mixed martial arts event held by Absolute Championship Berkut on April 22, 2017, at the Gamid Gamidov Palace of Sports in Khasavyurt, Russia.

=== Background ===
Bonus awards:

The following fighters were awarded $5,000 bonuses:

- Fight of the Night: Magomadov vs Grozin
- Submission of the Night: Askar Askarov

=== Result ===
ACB 58
Weight Class				Method	Round	Time	Notes
Flyweight 57 kg	(Russia) Askar Askarov (c)	def.	(United States) Anthony Leone	Submission (Twister)	3	2:49	For the ACB Flyweight Championship
Lightweight 70 kg	(Brazil) Felipe Cruz	def.	(Russia) Alim Cherkesov	Submission (Guillotine Choke)	3	3:17	
Light Heavyweight 93 kg	(Belarus) Igor Litoshik	def.	(Russia) Murad Chunkaiev	Submission (Guillotine Choke)	1	0:48	
Middleweight 84 kg	(Russia) Oleg Olenichev	def.	(Russia) Azamat Amagov	Submission (Rear Naked Choke)	3	2:51	
Bantamweight 61 kg	(Russia) Azamat Kerefov	def.	(Russia) Khamid Sultanbiev	Decision (Unanimous)	3	5:00	
Heavyweight 120 kg	(Russia) Kurban Ibragimov	def.	(Russia) Konstantin Andreitsev	Decision (Majority)	3	5:00	
Lightweight 70 kg	(Russia) Viskhan Magomadov	def.	(Russia) Aleksandr Grozin	Decision (Unanimous)	3	5:00	
Featherweight 66 kg	(Russia) Islam Meshev	def.	(Russia) Akhmadkhan Bokov	Decision (Majority)	3	5:00	
Light Heavyweight 93 kg	(Russia) Khabib Isaev	def.	(Russia) Evgeniy Belyaev	Decision (Unanimous)	3	5:00	
Lightweight 70 kg	(Russia) Magomed-Emin Myatliev	vs.	(Russia) Oleg Belozerov	TKO (Punches)	1	3:01	
Preliminary Card
Lightweight 70 kg	(Russia) Abdula Abdulaev	def.	(Sweden) Jonathan Svensson	Decision (Unanimous)	3	5:00	
Bantamweight 61 kg	(Russia) Husein Shaihaev	def.	(Kyrgyzstan) Ryskulbek Ibraimov	Decision (Unanimous)	3	5:00	
Bantamweight 61 kg	(Russia) Gadzhimurad Aliev	def.	(Armenia) German Barsegyan	Decision (Unanimous)	3	5:00	
Heavyweight 120 kg	(Russia) Murat Gugov	def.	(Russia) Anzor Shakhmurzaev	Submission (Guillotine Choke)	2	0:32	
Light Heavyweight 93 kg	(Russia) Amirkhan Guliev	def.	(Azerbaijan) Elmar Muradzade	Decision (Majority)	3	5:00	
Lightweight 70 kg	(Russia) Akhmed Ibragimov	vs.	(Russia) Kemran Mamedov	Decision (Unanimous)	3	5:00	
Bantamweight 61 kg	(Russia) Saygid Abdulaev	def.	(Tajikistan) Firuz Abdulloev	Submission (Rear Naked Choke)	1	2:21	

== ACB 59: Young Eagles 18 ==
ACB 59: Young Eagles 18
- Promotion: Absolute Championship Berkut
- Date: April 29, 2017 (Cancelled)
- Venue: Palace of sports "Manege"
- City: Vladikavkaz, Russia

Absolute Championship Berkut 59: Young Eagles 18 was a mixed martial arts event held by Absolute Championship Berkut on April 29, 2017, at the Palace of sports "Manege" in Vladikavkaz, Russia.

Mairbek Khasiev canceled this event. The reason was racist problems between Chechens and Ossetians. Greater likelihood of conflict.

=== Result ===
ACB 58
Weight Class				Method	Round	Time	Notes
Welterweight 77 kg	(Russia) Ibrahim Tebilov	vs.	(Brazil) Jean Felipe Prestes				
Welterweight 77 kg	(Russia) Husein Kushagov	vs.	(Brazil) Roberto Neves				
Middleweight 84 kg	(Russia) Baisangur Vakhitov	vs.	(United States) Will Noland				
Middleweight 84 kg	(Russia) Rustam Chsiev	vs.	(Russia) Timur Shidov				
Lightweight 70 kg	(Russia) Yusup Umarov	vs.	(Brazil) Alex Sandro				
Lightweight 70 kg	(Russia) Daud Shaikhaev	vs.	(Switzerland) Michael Bobner				
Lightweight 70 kg	(Russia) Magomed Raisov	vs.	(Russia) Sukhrob Davlatov				
Featherweight 66 kg	(Russia) Islam Meshev	vs.	(Ukraine) Yuriy Chobuka				

== ACB 60: Aguev vs. Devent ==
ACB 60: Aguev vs. Devent
- Promotion: Absolute Championship Berkut
- Date: May 13, 2017
- Venue: Hallmann dome
- City: Vienna, Austria
- Attendance: ~ 3,000

Event chronology
ACB 58	ACB 60: Aguev vs. Devent	ACB 61

Absolute Championship Berkut 60: Aguev vs. Devent was a mixed martial arts event held by Absolute Championship Berkut on May 13, 2017, in Vienna, Austria.

=== Background ===
Bonus awards:

The following fighters will be awarded $10,000 bonuses:

- Fight of the Night: Herdeson Batista vs Rasul Yakhyaev
- Knockout of the Night: Arbi Agujev
- Submission of the Night: Marko Burušić

=== Result ===
ACB 60
Weight Class				Method	Round	Time	Notes
Welterweight 77 kg	(Russia) Arbi Agujev	def.	(England) Andy DeVent	KO (knee and punches)	1	0:21	
Welterweight 77 kg	(Russia) Ali Eskiev	def.	(Kazakhstan) Igor Svirid	Decision (split)	3	5:00	
Lightweight 70 kg	(Russia) Shamil Nikaev	def.	(Romania) Aurel Pîrtea	Decision (unanimous)	3	5:00	
Welterweight 77 kg	(Russia) Ismail Naurdiev	def.	(Australia) Benny Alloway	KO (body kick)	1	2:24	
Flyweight 57 kg	(United States) Zach Makovsky	def.	(Brazil) Josiel Silva	Submission (guillotine choke)	3	1:08	
Welterweight 77 kg	(Poland) Rafal Lewon	def.	(Russia) Tamerlan Dadaev	Decision (split)	3	5:00	
Lightweight 70 kg	(Brazil) Herdeson Batista	def.	(Russia) Rasul Yakhyaev	Decision (unanimous)	3	5:00	
Welterweight 77 kg	(Croatia) Marko Burušić	def.	(Turkey) Burak Kizilirmak	Verbal Submission (armbar)	1	0:39	
Middleweight 84 kg	(Slovakia) Roland Cambal	def.	(Austria) Markus Di Gallo	TKO (corner stoppage)	2	3:07	
Featherweight 65 kg	(Russia) Islam Isaev	def.	(Brazil) Andre Nogueira	Decision (unanimous)	3	5:00	
Featherweight 65 kg	(Russia) Arbi Medzhidov	def.	(Romania) Ioan Vrânceanu	Decision (unanimous)	3	5:00	
Featherweight 65 kg	(Slovakia) Ľudovít Klein	def.	(Russia) Akhmed Abdulkarydov	Submission (guillotine choke)	2	4:40	

== ACB 61: Balaev vs. Bataev ==
ACB 61: Balaev vs. Bataev
- Promotion: Absolute Championship Berkut
- Date: May 20, 2017
- Venue: Sibur Arena
- City: Saint Petersburg, Russia
- Attendance: ~ 6,000

Event chronology
ACB 60	ACB 61: Balaev vs. Bataev	ACB 59

Absolute Championship Berkut 61: Balaev vs. Bataev was a mixed martial arts event held by Absolute Championship Berkut on May 20, 2017, in Saint Petersburg, Russia.

=== Background ===
The bout between Ilya Shcheglov (5–1) and Wallyson Carvalho (8–2) is canceled due to Shcheglov's injury.

The fight between Andrei Koshkin and Eduard Vartanyan was canceled due to Vartanyan's injury.

Bonus awards:

The following fighters were awarded $10,000 bonuses:

- Fight of the Night: Balaev vs Bataev
- Submission of the Night: Arman Ospanov

=== Result ===
ACB 61
Weight Class				Method	Round	Time	Notes
Featherweight 66 kg	(Russia) Marat Balaev (c)	def.	(Russia) Adlan Bataev	Decision (split)	5	5:00	For the ACB Featherweight Championship
Middleweight 84 kg	(Russia) Aleksei Butorin	def.	(Bulgaria) Nikola Dipchikov	TKO (punches)	1	4:07	
Welterweight 77 kg	(Russia) Beslan Isaev	def.	(Bosnia and Herzegovina) Elvis Mutapčić	KO (punches)	1	0:33	
Welterweight 77 kg	(Russia) Albert Tumenov	def.	(Brazil) Ismael de Jesus	KO (punch)	1	0:46	
Heavyweight 120 kg	(Estonia) Denis Smoldarev	def.	(Canada) Tanner Boser	Decision (unanimous)	3	5:00	
Bantamweight 61 kg	(Russia) Oleg Borisov	def.	(Russia) Dukvaha Ostamirov	Decision (unanimous)	3	5:00	
Featherweight 65 kg	(Kazakhstan) Arman Ospanov	def.	(Japan) Taichi Nakajima	KO (wheel kick)	2	1:35	
Welterweight 77 kg	(Russia) Aleksey Martynov	def.	(Russia) Vasily Palok	Decision (unanimous)	3	5:00	
Featherweight 65 kg	(Russia) Rustam Kerimov	def.	(Azerbaijan) Tural Ragimov	KO (punches)	1	0:22	
Middleweight 84 kg	(Russia) Mikhail Kolobegov	def.	(Poland) Piotr Strus	Decision (split)	3	5:00	
Featherweight 65 kg	(Peru) Luis Palomino	def.	(Brazil) Marcos Vinicius Schmitz	Decision (unanimous)	3	5:00	

== ACB 59: Young Eagles 18 ==
ACB 59
- Promotion: Absolute Championship Berkut
- Date: May 25, 2017
- Venue: Sports Hall Coliseum
- City: (Russia) Grozny, Chechnya
- Attendance: ~ 3,500

Event chronology
ACB 61	ACB 59	ACB 62

Absolute Championship Berkut 59: Young Eagles 18 was a mixed martial arts event held by Absolute Championship Berkut on May 25, 2017, in Grozny, Russia.

=== Background ===
This event was moved from Vladikavkaz to Grozny.

Bonus awards:

The following fighters were awarded $5,000 bonuses:

- Fight of the Night: Keldibekov vs. Dzhabrailov
- Knockout of the Night: Yusup Umarov
- Submission of the Night: Daud Shaikhaev
- Special bonus from Mairbek Khasiev: Baysangur Vakhitov
- $3000 Stoppage Victory Bonuses: Gadjimurad Olohanov, Aslan Shogov, Ilyas Yakubov, Rustam Gadzhiev, Abdisalam Kubanych, Shamil Akhmaev, Sukhrob Davlatov

=== Result ===
ACB 59
Weight Class				Method	Round	Time	Notes
Welterweight 77 kg	(Russia) Husein Kushagov	def.	(Brazil) Roberto Neves	Decision (unanimous)	3	5:00	
Middleweight 84 kg	(Russia) Baysangur Vakhitov	def.	(Belarus) Igor Litoshik	KO (punch)	1	1:25	
Lightweight 70 kg	(Russia) Yusup Umarov	def.	(Brazil) Alessandro Alves	KO (punches)	1	1:30	
Heavyweight 120 kg	(Russia) Rasul Saytkhojayev	def.	(Russia) Khanif Mirzamagomedov	Decision (unanimous)	3	5:00	
Lightweight 70 kg	(Russia) Daud Shaikhaev	def.	(Switzerland) Michael Bobner	Submission (guillotine choke)	2	0:38	
Lightweight 70 kg	(Tajikistan) Sukhrob Davlatov	def.	(Russia) Rakhman Makhazhiev	Technical Submission (guillotine choke)	1	1:11	
Featherweight 65 kg	(Russia) Alihan Suleimanov	def.	(Uzbekistan) Alikhon Khasanov	Decision (unanimous)	3	5:00	
Featherweight 66 kg	(Russia) Saifullah Dzhabrailov	def.	(Kyrgyzstan) Kanat Keldibekov	Decision (unanimous)	3	5:00	
Lightweight 70 kg	(Kyrgyzstan) Abdisalam Kubanych	vs.	(Russia) Usman Bisultanov	TKO (punches and elbows)	2	4:45	
Welterweight 77 kg	(Kazakhstan) Maxim Konovalov	def.	(Russia) Viskhan Amirkhanov	Decision (unanimous)	3	5:00	
Middleweight 84 kg	(Russia) Rustam Gadzhiev	def.	(Russia) Timur Shidov	Submission (kneebar)	2	2:39	
Bantamweight 61 kg	(Russia) Aliskhan Chadaev	def.	(Kyrgyzstan) Aidarbek Kabylov	Decision (unanimous)	3	5:00	
Flyweight 56 kg	(Russia) Shamil Akhmaev	def.	(Russia) Ruslan Mavludov	Submission (guillotine choke)	1	1:48	
Featherweight 66 kg	(Russia) Adam Gagiev	def.	(Russia) Eldar Shopagov	Decision (unanimous)	3	5:00	
Middleweight 84 kg	(Russia) Ilyas Yakubov	def.	(Russia) Aleksander Kozubenko	Submission (keylock)	1	2:20	
Bantamweight 61 kg	(Russia) Aslan Shogov	def.	(Russia) Bagvadin Saidov	Technical Submission (Ezekiel choke)	2	2:12	
Lightweight 70 kg	(Russia) Gadjimurad Olohanov	def.	(Russia) Muhammad Pashayev	Submission (triangle choke)	2	3:57	

== ACB 62: Stepanyan vs. Cruz ==
ACB 62: Stepanyan vs. Cruz
- Promotion: Absolute Championship Berkut
- Date: June 17, 2017
- Venue: Sport-Don Sports Palace
- City: Rostov-on-Don, Russia

Event chronology
ACB 59	ACB 62: Stepanyan vs. Cruz	ACB 63

Absolute Championship Berkut 62: Stepanyan vs. Cruz was a mixed martial arts event held by Absolute Championship Berkut on June 17, 2017, in Rostov-on-Don, Russia.

=== Background ===
The fight between Igor Fernandes and Michail Tsarev was canceled due to Tsarev's injury.

Adam Townsend was slated to make his ACB debut in this event against Alexandr Shabily. Unfortunately, Townsend came in on the scales at 162 lbs. The bout against Shabily was canceled.

Bonus awards:

The following fighters will be awarded $10,000 bonuses:

- Fight of the Night: Valeriy Khazhirokov vs Isaac Pimentel
- Knockout of the Night: Akop Stepanyan
- Submission of the Night: Jonas Billstein
- $5000 Stoppage Victory Bonuses: Alexander Peduson, Dovletdzhan Yagshimuradov, Sergei Bilostenniy, Sergey Martynov, Narek Avagyan, Evgeny Belyaev

=== Result ===
ACB 62
Weight Class				Method	Round	Time	Notes
Featherweight 65 kg	(Armenia) Akop Stepanyan	def.	(Brazil) Felipe Cruz	KO (Spinning Wheel Kick)	1	4:38	
Middleweight 84 kg	(Germany) Jonas Billstein	def.	(Russia) Grachiya Bozinyan	Submission (smother choke)	2	4:11	
Featherweight 65 kg	(Russia) Alexander Peduson	def.	(Armenia) Artak Nazaryan	TKO (Punches)	1	3:29	
Light Heavyweight 93 kg	(Turkmenistan) Dovletdzhan Yagshimuradov	def.	(United States) Jared Torgeson	Submission (rear-naked choke)	3	0:39	
Bantamweight 61 kg	(Russia) Valeriy Khazhirokov	vs.	(Brazil) Isaac Pimentel	TKO (punches)	3	2:56	
Light Heavyweight 93 kg	(Russia) Sergei Bilostenniy	def.	(Russia) Dmitry Zabolotny	TKO (punches)	2	2:51	
Middleweight 84 kg	(Russia) Sergey Martynov	def.	(Kyrgyzstan) Daniyar Abdubaev	TKO (punches)	3	3:12	
Bantamweight 61 kg	(Armenia) Narek Avagyan	def.	(Ukraine) Anton Vasilyev	Submission (Armbar)	1	0:59	
Middleweight 84 kg	(Russia) Evgeny Belyaev	def.	(Russia) Hayk Gasparyan	Submission (heel hook)	1	1:12	

== ACB 63: Celiński vs. Magalhaes ==
ACB 63: Celiński vs. Magalhaes
- Promotion: Absolute Championship Berkut
- Date: July 1, 2017
- Venue: Ergo Arena
- City: Gdańsk, Poland

Event chronology
ACB 62	ACB 63: Celiński vs. Magalhaes	ACB KB 10

Absolute Championship Berkut 63: Celiński vs. Magalhaes was a mixed martial arts event held by Absolute Championship Berkut on July 1, 2017, in Gdańsk, Poland.

=== Background ===
Bonus awards:

The following fighters will be awarded $10,000 bonuses:

- Fight of the Night: Adrian Zieliński vs Piotr Hallmann
- Submission of the Night: Mindaugas Verzbickas
- $5000 Stoppage Victory Bonuses: Piotr Strus, Przemyslaw Mysiala, Patrik Kincl, Paweł Kiełek, Luke Barnatt

=== Result ===
ACB 63
Weight Class				Method	Round	Time	Notes
Light Heavyweight 93 kg	(Poland) Karol Celinski	def.	(Brazil) Vinny Magalhães	Decision (Unanimous)	3	5:00	
Middleweight 84 kg	(Poland) Piotr Strus	def.	(England) Andy DeVent	Submission (Arm Triangle Choke)	2	3:53	
Middleweight 84 kg	(England) Luke Barnatt	def.	(Sweden) Max Nunes	KO (Punch)	1	4:08	
Lightweight 70 kg	(Poland) Piotr Hallmann	def.	(Poland) Adrian Zielinski	Decision (Split)	3	5:00	
Middleweight 84 kg	(Bulgaria) Nikola Dipchikov	def.	(Poland) Maciej Rozanski	Decision (Unanimous)	3	5:00	
Welterweight 77 kg	(Poland) Ireneusz Szydlowski	def.	(Poland) Pawel Kielek	TKO (Punches)	2	4:17	
Welterweight 77 kg	(Czech Republic) Patrik Kincl	def.	(Brazil) Igor Fernandes	TKO (Head Kick and Punches)	1	4:59	
Light Heavyweight 93 kg	(Poland) Przemyslaw Mysiala	def.	(Brazil) Wallyson Carvalho	TKO (Punches)	1	2:03	
Welterweight 77 kg	(Lithuania) Mindaugas Verzbickas	def.	(Poland) Kamil Gniadek	Submission (D'arce Choke)	2	0:59	
Featherweight 66 kg	(Poland) Kacper Formela	def.	(Armenia) Armen Stepanyan	Decision (Unanimous)	3	5:00	
Bantamweight 61 kg	(Poland) Jakub Wikłacz	def.	(Poland) Sebastian Przybysz	Decision (Unanimous)	3	5:00	

== ACB KB 10: Russia vs. China ==
ACB KB 10: Russia vs. China
- Promotion: Absolute Championship Berkut
- Date: July 15, 2017
- Venue: Izmailovo Sports Palace
- City: Moscow, Russia

Event chronology
ACB 63	ACB KB 10: Russia vs. China	ACB 64

Absolute Championship Berkut Kickboxing 10: Russia vs. China was a kickboxing event held by Absolute Championship Berkut on July 15, 2017, at Izmailovo Sports Palace in Moscow, Russia.

=== Result ===
ACB KB 10
Weight Class				Method	Round	Time	Notes
Welterweight 77 kg	(Russia) Alexander Stetsurenko	def.	(Belgium) Zakaria Baitar	TKO (Leg Injury)	2	1:06	
Middleweight 84 kg	(Belarus) Igor Bugaenko	def.	(Morocco) Hicham El Gaoui	Decision (Unanimous)	3	3:00	
Lightweight 70 kg	(Russia) Vadim Davydov	def.	(China) Zhang Ren	Decision (Unanimous)	3	3:00	
Heavyweight 120 kg	(Ukraine) Tsotne Rogava	def.	(Germany) Vladimir Toktasynov	KO (Knee)	3	0:48	
Light Heavyweight 95 kg	(Russia) Beybulat Isaev	def.	(China) Hao Guanghua	Decision (Unanimous)	3	3:00	
Featherweight 65 kg	(Russia) Tamerlan Bashirov	def.	(Russia) Vitaliy Volosovski	Decision (Unanimous)	3	3:00	
Female Flyweight 56 kg	(Russia) Dilshoda Umarova	def.	(China) Li Mingrui	Decision (Unanimous)	3	3:00	
Featherweight 65 kg	(Germany) Dennis Vosek	def.	(Russia) Said Magomedov	KO (Body Kick)	3	1:19	
Welterweight 77 kg	(Russia) Islam Khozhdevdiev	def.	(Russia) Alexander Yermoshin	TKO (Punches)	3	2:07	
Lightweight 70 kg	(Russia) Rashid Salikhov	def.	(China) Li Yankun	Decision (Unanimous)	3	3:00	
Featherweight 65 kg	(Russia) Nikita Surovezhkin	def.	(China) Liu Qiliang	Decision (Unanimous)	3	3:00	
Featherweight 65 kg	(Russia) Rodion Sheremet	def.	(China) Wang Shanwei	Decision (Unanimous)	3	3:00	
Featherweight 65 kg	(China) Chen Wende	def.	(Russia) Marat Kichikhanov	KO (Head Kick)	2	0:40	
Lightweight 70 kg	(Russia) Murad Arzulaev	def.	(China) Yong Ziquang	Decision (Unanimous)	3	3:00	
Welterweight 77 kg	(Russia) Arslan Magomedov	def.	(China) Yang Kunshan	Decision (Unanimous)	3	3:00	
Bantamweight 61 kg	(China) Xui Shenghen	def.	(Russia) Rolan Guliev	Decision (Unanimous)	3	3:00	

== ACB 64: Young Eagles 19 ==
ACB 64: Young Eagles 19
- Promotion: Absolute Championship Berkut
- Date: July 19, 2017
- Venue: Antalya Arena Spor Salonu
- City: Antalya, Turkey
- Attendance: ~100

Event chronology
ACB KB 10	ACB 64: Young Eagles 19	ACB 65

Absolute Championship Berkut 64: Young Eagles 19 was a mixed martial arts event held by Absolute Championship Berkut on July 19, 2017, at the Antalya Arena Spor Salonu in Antalya, Turkey.

=== Background ===
Bonus awards:

The following fighters will be awarded $5,000 bonuses:

- Fight of the Night: Magomed Khamzaev vs Maksim Maryanchuk
- Knockout of the Night: Nashkho Galaev
- Submission of the Night: Anzor Shakhmurzaev
- $3000 Stoppage Victory Bonuses: Vazha Tsiptauri, Khusein Maltsagov, Furkan Ari, Khusein Sheikhaev, Kadir Dalkiran

=== Result ===
ACB 64
Weight Class				Method	Round	Time	Notes
Featherweight 66 kg	(Russia) Magomed Khamzaev	def.	(Ukraine) Maksim Maryanchuk	Decision (Unanimous)	3	5:00	
Bantamweight 61 kg	(Russia) Nashkho Galaev	def.	(Kazakhstan) Denis Mutsnek	KO (Knee)	1	2:08	
Lightweight 70 kg	(Turkey) Kadir Dalkiran	def.	(Azerbaijan) Kenan Jafarli	Submission (Armbar)	2	1:34	
Bantamweight 61 kg	(Russia) Khusein Sheikhaev	def.	(Israel) Kirill Medvedovski	Submission (D'Arce Choke)	2	3:32	
Featherweight 66 kg	(Azerbaijan) Vugar Mamedzade	def.	(Russia) Saikhan Dzhabrailov	Decision (Unanimous)	3	5:00	
Lightweight 70 kg	(Bulgaria) Plamen Bachvarov	def.	(Russia) Muslim Abdulaev	Decision (Unanimous)	3	5:00	
Lightweight 70 kg	(Russia) Adlan Mamaev	def.	(Greece) George Kechgias	Decision (Unanimous)	3	5:00	
Bantamweight 61 kg	(Turkey) Furkan Ari	def.	(Russia) Rustam Karaev	Submission (Guillotine Choke)	1	1:50	
Middleweight 84 kg	(Iran) Hassan Amouei	def.	(Turkey) Emre Kuru	TKO (Punches)	3	3:47	
Featherweight 66 kg	(Russia) Khusein Maltsagov	def.	(Azerbaijan) Pyarvin Mustafaev	Submission (North-South Choke)	2	1:32	
Featherweight 66 kg	(Georgia (country)) Mate Sanikidze	def.	(Turkey) Halil Dogan	TKO (Corner Stoppage)	1	5:00	
Lightweight 70 kg	(Tajikistan) Mohamadzhavad Kaviapev	def.	(Turkey) Ozgur Ichoz	TKO (Punches)	3	4:34	
Heavyweight 120 kg	(Russia) Anzor Shakhmurzaev	def.	(Russia) Murat Kilimetov	Submission (Standing Guillotine Choke)	1	2:56	
Bantamweight 61 kg	(Georgia (country)) Vazha Tsiptauri	def.	(Turkey) Murat Chepel	TKO (Head Kick and Punches)	1	4:36	
Lightweight 70 kg	(Armenia) Sargis Vardanyan	def.	(Turkey) Kerim Keleş	Decision (Unanimous)	3	5:00	

== ACB 65: Silva vs. Agnaev ==
ACB 65: Silva vs. Agnaev
- Promotion: Absolute Championship Berkut
- Date: July 22, 2017
- Venue: Sheffield Arena
- City: Sheffield, England

Event chronology
ACB 64	ACB 65: Silva vs. Agnaev	ACB 66

Absolute Championship Berkut 65: Silva vs. Agnaev was a mixed martial arts event held by Absolute Championship Berkut on July 22, 2017, at the Sheffield Arena in Sheffield, England.

=== Background ===
The event will be the second that the promotion have host in California, U.S. and first since ACB 51: Silva vs. Torgeson in January 2017.

Bonus awards:

The following fighters will be awarded $10,000 bonuses:

- Fight of the Night: Joshua Aveles vs Leandro Sillva
- Knockout of the Night: Alexey Polpudnikov
- Submission of the Night: Aaron Robinson
- $5000 Stoppage Victory Bonuses: Simon Stadnicki, Likasz Pilch, Antonio Sheldon, Aaron Aby, Mike Grundy, Sam Boult, Vyacheslav Vasilevskiy, Batraz Agnaev

=== Result ===
ACB 65
Weight Class				Method	Round	Time	Notes
Light Heavyweight 93 kg	(Russia) Batraz Agnaev	def.	(Brazil) Thiago Silva (c)	TKO (Punches)	2	3:34	For the ACB Light Heavyweight Championship
Lightweight 70 kg	(United States) Pat Healy	def.	(England) Brendan Loughnane	Decision (Split)	3	5:00	
Middleweight 84 kg	(Russia) Vyacheslav Vasilevsky	def.	(United States) Will Noland	Submission (Rear Naked Choke)	1	4:56	
Lightweight 70 kg	(United States) Joshua Aveles	def.	(Brazil) Leandro Silva	Decision (Unanimous)	3	5:00	
Featherweight 65 kg	(Russia) Alexey Polpudnikov	def.	(United States) Donald Sanchez	KO (Punches)	1	1:32	
Featherweight 66 kg	(England) Andrew Fisher	def.	(Sweden) Niklas Bäckström	Decision (Unanimous)	3	5:00	
Welterweight 77 kg	(England) Sam Boult	def.	(England) Adam Boussif	Submission (Rear Naked Choke)	1	3:54	
Featherweight 66 kg	(England) Mike Grundy	def.	(Australia) Michael Tobin	Submission (Guillotine Choke)	3	4:37	
Bantamweight 66 kg	(Wales) Aaron Aby	def.	(England) Sam Halliday	Submission (Arm-Triangle Choke)	1	3:06	
Lightweight 70 kg	(England) Antonio Sheldon	def.	(England) Ricardo Franko	Submission (Rear Naked Choke)	2	4:14	
Lightweight 70 kg	(England) Aaron Robinson	def.	(Republic of Ireland) Adam Caffrey	Submission (Rear Naked Choke)	1	2:06	
Welterweight 77 kg	(Poland) Łukasz Pilch	def.	(England) James Doyle	KO (Punches)	1	0:09	
Lightweight 70 kg	(England) Simon Stadnicki	def.	(England) Ollie Coyne	Submission (Rear Naked Choke)	2	0:58	

== ACB 66: Young Eagles 20 ==
ACB 66: Young Eagles 20
- Promotion: Absolute Championship Berkut
- Date: August 5, 2017
- Venue: Sports Hall Coliseum
- City: Grozny, Russia

Event chronology
ACB 65	ACB 66: Young Eagles 20	ACB 67

Absolute Championship Berkut 66: Young Eagles 20 was a mixed martial arts event held by Absolute Championship Berkut on August 5, 2017, at the Sports Hall Coliseum in Grozny, Russia.

=== Background ===
Bonus awards:

The following fighters will be awarded $5,000 bonuses:

- Fight of the Night: Walter Pereira jr. vs Islam Yunusov
- Knockout of the Night: Herdeson Batista
- Submission of the Night: Akhmed Kukaev
- $3000 Stoppage Victory Bonuses: Abdulla Almurzaev, Aleksandr Antonenko, Inal Kerimov, Aslan Izmailov, Stanislav Zinchenko, Movsar Bokov, Mehdi Baidulaev, Vaha Shanhoev, Vadim Panevin, Rustam Taldiev, Amirkhan Guliev, Viskhan Magomadov, Baisangur Vakhitov

=== Fight card ===
ACB 66
Weight Class				Method	Round	Time	Notes
Lightweight 70 kg	(Brazil) Herdeson Batista	def.	(Russia) Daud Shaikhaev	KO (Knee)	1	3:09	
Middleweight 84 kg	(Russia) Baisangur Vakhitov	def.	(Brazil) Bruno Assis	TKO (Punches)	1	2:54	
Featherweight 66 kg	(Sweden) Carlos Prada	def.	(Russia) Akhmadkhan Bokov	Decision (Unanimous)	3	5:00	
Lightweight 70 kg	(Russia) Viskhan Magomadov	def.	(Ukraine) Oleg Khachaturov	KO (Punches)	1	3:54	
Light Heavyweight 93 kg	(Russia) Amirkhan Guliev	def.	(Ukraine) Aleksandr Pysanko	TKO (Punches)	1	3:58	
Lightweight 70 kg	(Russia) Bai-Ali Shaipov	vs.	(Germany) Anatoli Baar	No Contest	1	2:39	Referee Premature Stoppage
Lightweight 70 kg	(Russia) Beckhan Aktaliev	def.	(Albania) Claudio Vecani	Decision (Unanimous)	3	5:00	
Bantamweight 61 kg	(Brazil) Walter Pereira Jr.	def.	(Russia) Islam Yunusov	Submission (Rear Naked Choke)	3	1:00	
Bantamweight 61 kg	(Russia) Rustam Taldiev	def.	(Albania) Errand Elezaj	Submission (Rear Naked Choke)	3	1:21	
Lightweight 70 kg	(Germany) Attila Korkmaz	def.	(Russia) Alibek Akhazaev	Decision (Unanimous)	3	5:00	
Bantamweight 61 kg	(Russia) Vadim Panevin	def.	(Russia) Adam Gagiev	Submission (Guillotine Choke)	1	4:14	
Lightweight 70 kg	(Russia) Adam Aliev	def.	(Brazil) Josué Vieira	Decision (Unanimous)	3	5:00	
Lightweight 70 kg	(Russia) Vaha Shanhoev	def.	(Belarus) Ivan Gulchin	TKO (Punches)	3	3:53	
Bantamweight 61 kg	(Russia) Mehdi Baidulaev	def.	(Ukraine) Nikolay Kondratuk	KO (Punches)	2	1:33	
Welterweight 77 kg	(Russia) Movsar Bokov	def.	(Tajikistan) Farzad Ghaderi	TKO (Punches)	2	1:42	
Welterweight 77 kg	(Russia) Umar Gaisumov	def.	(Ukraine) Anatoly Safronov	Decision (Unanimous)	3	5:00	
Welterweight 77 kg	(Ukraine) Stanislav Zinchenko	def.	(Russia) Zurab Archakov	TKO (Elbows)	1	4:45	
Middleweight 84 kg	(Russia) Aslan Izmailov	def.	(Kyrgyzstan) Nurbek Abdyjaparov	KO (Punches)	2	4:31	
Bantamweight 61 kg	(Russia) Akhmed Kukaev	def.	(Russia) Marat Tagirov	Submission (Guillotine Choke)	1	3:31	
Middleweight 84 kg	(Russia) Inal Kerimov	def.	(Russia) Ilyas Tutaev	TKO (Punches)	3	2:45	
Bantamweight 61 kg	(Russia) Aleksandr Antonenko	def.	(Russia) Abo Dzeytov	TKO (Punches)	2	1:27	
Lightweight 70 kg	(Russia) Abdulla Almurzaev	def.	(Ukraine) Aleksey Sotnikov	TKO (Punches)	1	3:35	
Bantamweight 61 kg	(Russia) Amir Badiev	def.	(Turkmenistan) Intezar Babaniyazov	Decision (Unanimous)	3	5:00	

== ACB 67: Cooper vs. Berkhamov ==
ACB 67: Cooper vs. Berkhamov
- Promotion: Absolute Championship Berkut
- Date: August 19, 2017
- Venue: Sports Hall Coliseum
- City: Grozny, Chechnya, Russia
- Attendance: ~ 4,500

Event chronology
ACB 66	ACB 67: Cooper vs. Berkhamov	ACB 68

Absolute Championship Berkut 67: Cooper vs. Berkhamov will be a mixed martial arts event held by Absolute Championship Berkut on August 19, 2017, in Grozny, Russia.

=== Background ===
Bonus awards:

The following fighters will be awarded $10,000 bonuses:

- Fight of the Night: Yusuf Raisov vs. Luis Palomino
- Knockout of the Night: Alexandr Shabliy
- Submission of the Night: Rasul Albaskhanov
- $5000 Stoppage Victory Bonuses: Rasul Shovhalov, Amirkhan Adaev, Jose Daniel Toledo, Magomed Magomedov, Albert Duraev, Mukhomad Vakhaev, Mukhamed Berkhamov

=== Fight card ===
ACB 67
Weight Class				Method	Round	Time	Notes
Welterweight 77 kg	(Russia) Mukhamed Berkhamov	def.	(United States) Brett Cooper (c)	KO (Punches)	2	0:32	For the ACB Welterweight Championship
Heavyweight 120 kg	(Russia) Mukhomad Vakhaev	def.	(Russia) Denis Goltsov (c)	TKO (Submission to strikes)	4	1:57	For the ACB Heavyweight Championship
Middleweight 84 kg	(Russia) Albert Duraev	def.	(United States) Clifford Starks	Submission (Rear Naked Choke)	2	2:34	
Featherweight 66 kg	(Russia) Yusuf Raisov	def.	(Peru) Luis Palomino	Decision (Unanimous)	3	5:00	
Bantamweight 61 kg	(Russia) Magomed Magomedov	def.	(England) Dean Garnett	Submission (Guillotine Choke)	1	4:16	
Flyweight 57 kg	(Russia) Rasul Albaskhanov	def.	(United States) Darren Mima	Submission (Guillotine Choke)		2:01	
Heavyweight 120 kg	(Russia) Salimgerey Rasulov	def.	(Russia) Evgeny Erokhin	TKO (Injury)	1	5:00	
Light Heavyweight 93 kg	(Russia) Abdul-Rakhman Dzhanaev	def.	(Brazil) Isac Almeida	Decision (Unanimous)	3	5:00	
Lightweight 70 kg	(Russia) Alexandr Shabliy	def.	(Brazil) Gleristone Santos	KO (Knee)	1	1:44	
Light Heavyweight 93 kg	(Spain) Jose Daniel Toledo	def.	(Russia) Muslim Makhmudov	KO (Punch)	1	3:07	
Lightweight 70 kg	(Russia) Amirkhan Adaev	vs.	(Brazil) Otávio dos Santos	TKO (Punches)	2	1:17	
Lightweight 70 kg	(Russia) Rasul Shovhalov	def.	(Brazil) Tiago Trator	TKO (Punches)	1	2:15	
Featherweight 66 kg	(Brazil) João Luis Nogueira	def.	(Russia) Abdul-Rakhman Temirov	Decision (Unanimous)	3	5:00	
Bantamweight 61 kg	(Russia) Shamil Shakhbulatov	def.	(Russia) Evgeniy Lazukov	Decision (Unanimous)	3	5:00	
Middleweight 84 kg	(Russia) Gamzat Khiramagomedov	def.	(Brazil) Marcelo Barbosa	Decision (Unanimous)	3	5:00	

== ACB 68: Young Eagles 21 ==
ACB 68: Young Eagles 21
- Promotion: Absolute Championship Berkut
- Date: August 26, 2017
- Venue: Tax Committee Sports Center
- City: Dushanbe, Tajikistan

Event chronology
ACB 67	ACB 68: Young Eagles 21	ACB 69

Absolute Championship Berkut 68: Young Eagles 21 will be a mixed martial arts event held by Absolute Championship Berkut on August 26, 2017, at the Tax Committee Sports Center in Dushanbe, Tajikistan.

=== Background ===
Bonus awards:

The following fighters will be awarded $5,000 bonuses:

- Knockout of the Night: Magomed Raisov
- Submission of the Night: Firdavs Nazarov
- $3000 Stoppage Victory Bonuses: Radzhabali Fayzidini, Mubaraksho Mubarakshoev, Denis Kanakov, Lambert Akhiadov, Kiamrian Abbasov, Fatkhidin Sobirov, Stanislav Vlasenko, Sharaf Davlatmurodov

=== Fight card ===
ACB 68
Weight Class				Method	Round	Time	Notes
Welterweight 77 kg	(Tajikistan) Sharaf Davlatmurodov	def.	(Lithuania) Mindaugas Veržbickas	Submission (Rear Naked Choke)	2	2:38	
Welterweight 77 kg	(Russia) Stanislav Vlasenko	def.	(Russia) Sergey Khandozhko	Submission (Triangle Choke)	3	3:34	
Bantamweight 61 kg	(Tajikistan) Fatkhidin Sobirov	def.	(Russia) Guseyn Khalikhov	Submission (Rear Naked Choke)	1	1:55	
Welterweight 77 kg	(Kyrgyzstan) Kiamrian Abbasov	def.	(Russia) Aslambek Arsamikov	Submission (Guillotine Choke)	2	1:01	
Featherweight 66 kg	(Russia) Lambert Akhiadov	def.	(Kyrgyzstan) Nemat Abdrashitov	Submission (Rear Naked Choke)	3	4:57	
Lightweight 70 kg	(Russia) Magomed Raisov	def.	(Tajikistan) Sukhrob Davlatov	TKO (Punches)	1	0:45	
Flyweight 57 kg	(Tajikistan) Azam Gaforov	def.	(Ukraine) Ivan Andrushchenko	Decision (Unanimous)	3	5:00	
Featherweight 66 kg	(Russia) Amir Elzhurkaev	def.	(Russia) Evgeniy Ryazanov	TKO (Retirement)	2	5:00	
Lightweight 70 kg	(Russia) Denis Kanakov	def.	(Afghanistan) Ahmed Wali Hotak	TKO (Punches)	3	4:10	
Featherweight 66 kg	(Brazil) Oberdan Vieira	def.	(Russia) Magomed Sulumov	Decision (Unanimous)	3	5:00	
Welterweight 77 kg	(Tajikistan) Mubaraksho Mubarakshoev	def.	(Germany) Arif Koyuncu	TKO(Punches)	2	3:02	
Welterweight 77 kg	(Russia) Dzhokhar Duraev	def.	(Uzbekistan) Nursulton Ruziboev	Decision (Unanimous)	3	5:00	
Featherweight 66 kg	(Tajikistan) Fayzidini Radzhabali	def.	(Russia) Yuri Semenov	TKO(Punches)	1	3:29	
Featherweight 66 kg	(Tajikistan) Firdavs Nazarov	def.	(Greece) Giorgos Tsilidis	Submission (Standing Guillotine Choke)	2	1:10	

== ACB 69: Young Eagles 22 ==
ACB 69: Young Eagles 22
- Promotion: Absolute Championship Berkut
- Date: September 9, 2017
- Venue: Almaty Arena
- City: Almaty, Kazakhstan
- Attendance: ~ 7,500

Absolute Championship Berkut 69: Young Eagles 22 will be a mixed martial arts event held by Absolute Championship Berkut on September 9, 2017, at the Almaty Arena in Almaty, Kazakhstan.

=== Background ===
Bonus awards:

The following fighters will be awarded $5,000 bonuses:

- Fight of the Night: Khamzat Aushev vs Mauricio Reis
- Knockout of the Night: Islam Isaev
- Submission of the Night: Rakhman Makhadzhiev
- $3000 Stoppage Victory Bonuses: Bakhtiyar Nesipbek, Karshyga Dautbek, Almanbet Zhanybekov, Asu Almabaev, Asylzhan Bakhytzhanuly, Saifulla Dzhabrailov, Alikhan Suleimanov, Cory Hendricks, Aurel Pirtea, Sergej Grecicho, Igor Svirid, Thiago Silva

=== Fight card ===
ACB 69
Weight Class				Method	Round	Time	Notes
Featherweight 66 kg	(Brazil) Thiago Silva	def.	(Kazakhstan) Arman Ospanov	Submission (Arm-Triangle Choke)	2	1:54	
Middleweight 84 kg	(Kazakhstan) Igor Svirid	def.	(Slovakia) Roland Čambal	Submission (Rear Naked Choke)	2	1:12	
Lightweight 70 kg	(Lithuania) Sergej Grecicho	def.	(Russia) Yusup Umarov	Submission (Kneebar)	2	1:34	
Featherweight 66 kg	(Russia) Islam Isaev	def.	(Brazil) Marcos Schmitz	KO (Punches)	2	1:39	
Lightweight 70 kg	(Russia) Khamzat Aushev	def.	(Brazil) Mauricio Reis	Decision (Split)	3	5:00	
Lightweight 70 kg	(Romania) Aurel Pirtea	def.	(Russia) Rasul Yakhyaev	Submission (Guillotine Choke)	1	3:56	
Light Heavyweight 93 kg	(United States) Cory Hendricks	def.	(Kazakhstan) Evgeny Egemberdiev	TKO (Head Kick and Punches)	1	1:43	
Featherweight 66 kg	(Russia) Alikhan Suleimanov	def.	(Brazil) Rafael Correa	Submission (Guillotine Choke)	3	0:44	
Featherweight 66 kg	(Russia) Saifulla Dzhabrailov	def.	(Brazil) Lerryan Douglas	KO (Spinning Back Kick to the Body)	1	1:01	
Heavyweight 120 kg	(Kazakhstan) Asylzhan Bakhytzhanuly	def.	(United States) Jared Torgeson	TKO (Punches and Elbows)	2	1:32	
Lightweight 70 kg	(Russia) Abdul-Rakhman Makhazhiev	vs.	(United States) Alonzo Martinez	Submission (Triangle Armbar)	1	3:26	
Flyweight 57 kg	(Kazakhstan) Asu Almabayev	def.	(Russia) Ibrahim Mamaev	Submission (Peruvian Necktie)	2	2:07	
Lightweight 70 kg	(Kyrgyzstan) Almanbet Zhanybekov	def.	(Kazakhstan) Olzhas Eskaraev	Submission (Guillotine Choke)	2	2:45	
Bantamweight 61 kg	(Kazakhstan) Karshyga Dautbek	def.	(Tajikistan) Emomali Kholboy	KO (Knee)	1	0:56	
Flyweight 57 kg	(Kazakhstan) Bakhtiyar Nesipbek	def.	(Tajikistan) Umed Akhmedov	KO (Knee to the Body)	1	0:35	

== ACB 70: The Battle of Britain ==
ACB 70: The Battle of Britain
- Promotion: Absolute Championship Berkut
- Date: September 23, 2017
- Venue: Sheffield Arena
- City: Sheffield, England

Absolute Championship Berkut 70: The Battle of Britain was a mixed martial arts event held by Absolute Championship Berkut on September 23, 2017vat the Sheffield Arena in Sheffield, England.

=== Background ===
Regis Sugden is forced out through injury, Richard Herbert steps in to face Jordan Barton.

Bonus awards:

The following fighters will be awarded $10,000 bonuses:

- Fight of the Night: Askham vs. Barnatt
- Knockout of the Night: Ibragim Chuzhigaev
- Submission of the Night: Cheya Saleem
- $5000 Stoppage Victory Bonuses: Adam Townsend, Bubba Jenkins, Magomed Ginazov

=== Fight card ===
ACB 70
Weight Class				Method	Round	Time	Notes
Middleweight 84 kg	(England) Scott Askham	def.	(England) Luke Barnatt	Decision (Split)	3	5:00	
Middleweight 84 kg	(Turkey) Ibragim Chuzhigaev	def.	(United States) Will Noland	KO (Head Kick and Punches)	1	1:32	
Welterweight 77 kg	(United States) Adam Townsend	def.	(Russia) Husein Kushagov	Submission (Rear Naked Choke)	3	3:24	
Featherweight 66 kg	(United States) Bubba Jenkins	def.	(Brazil) Diego Marlon	KO (Punches)	3	0:44	
Welterweight 77 kg	(Brazil) Ismael De Jesus	def.	(Russia) Ismail Naurdiev	Decision (Unanimous)	3	5:00	
Lightweight 70 kg	(England) Kane Mousah	def.	(England) Alex Enlund	Decision (Split)	3	5:00	
Bantamweight 61 kg	(Russia) Magomed Ginazov	def.	(Romania) Ioan Vrânceanu	TKO (Punches)	2	3:12	
Welterweight 77 kg	(England) Ashley Reece	def.	(England) Sam Boult	Decision (Split)	3	5:00	
Bantamweight 61 kg	(Russia) Kharon Orzumiev	def.	(Czech Republic) Filip Macek	Decision (Unanimous)	3	5:00	
Featherweight 66 kg	(England) Jordan Vucenic	def.	(England) Shoaib Yousaf	Decision (Unanimous)	3	5:00	
Flyweight 57 kg	(Wales) Aaron Aby	def.	(England) Daniel Missin	Decision (Unanimous)	3	5:00	
Flyweight 57 kg	(England) Cheya Saleem	def.	(England) Aaron Robinson	Submission (Guillotine Choke)	1	0:48	
Bantamweight 61 kg	(England) Danny Tombs	def.	(England) Gavin Sterritt	TKO (Punches)	2	4:07	
Bantamweight 61 kg	(England) Luke Shanks	def.	(England) Adam Bramhald	Submission (Guillotine Choke)	1	0:41	
Lightweight 70 kg	(England) Jordan Barton	def.	(England) Richard Herbert	Decision (Split)	3	5:00	

== ACB 71: Yan vs. Mattos ==
ACB 71: Koshkin vs. Vartanyan
- Promotion: Absolute Championship Berkut
- Date: September 30, 2017
- Venue: Dynamo Sports Palace
- City: Moscow, Russia
- Attendance: ~4,000

Absolute Championship Berkut 71: Yan vs. Mattos will be a mixed martial arts event held by Absolute Championship Berkut on September 30, 2017, at the Dynamo Sports Palace in Moscow, Russia.

=== Background ===
Mukhamed Kokov and Said-Khamzat Avkhadov didn't make weight. Alexnder Peduson and Akop Stepanyan refused to accept bouts, both fight were canceled.

Bonus awards:

The following fighters will be awarded $10,000 bonuses:

- Fight of the Night: Eduard Vartanyan vs. Andrey Koshkin
- Knockout of the Night: Aslambek Saidov
- Submission of the Night: Ruslan Abiltarov
- $5000 Stoppage Victory Bonuses: Amirkhan Isagadjiev, Rustam Kerimov, Oleg Borisov, Jonas Billstein, Petr Yan

=== Result ===
ACB 71
Weight Class				Method	Round	Time	Notes
Bantamweight 61 kg	(Russia) Petr Yan (c)	def.	(Brazil) Matheus Mattos	KO (Punches)	3	2:27	For the ACB Bantamweight Championship
Lightweight 70 kg	(Russia) Eduard Vartanyan	def.	(Russia) Andrey Koshkin	Decision (Unanimous)	5	5:00	For the Interim ACB Lightweight Championship
Welterweight 77 kg	(Russia) Aslambek Saidov	def.	(Brazil) Marcelo Alfaya	KO (Punches)	1	4:47	
Middleweight 84 kg	(Germany) Jonas Billstein	def.	(Russia) Aleksei Butorin	Submission (Rear Naked Choke)	2	2:31	
Bantamweight 61 kg	(Russia) Oleg Borisov	def.	(Russia) Murad Kalamov	KO (Punch)	1	2:12	
Lightweight 70 kg	(Russia) Ali Bagov	def.	(Brazil) Herdeson Batista	Decision (Unanimous)	3	5:00	
Lightweight 70 kg	(Russia) Shamil Nikaev	def.	(United States) Christos Giagos	Decision (Split)	3	5:00	
Bantamweight 61 kg	(Russia) Rustam Kerimov	def.	(Japan) Takeya Mizugaki	TKO (Punches)	1	3:19	
Light Heavyweight 93 kg	(Poland) Karol Celiński	def.	(Russia) Maxim Futin	Decision (Unanimous)	3	5:00	
Bantamweight 61 kg	(Russia) Dukvaha Astamirov	def.	(Brazil) Dileno Lopes	Decision (Unanimous)	3	5:00	
Flyweight 57 kg	(Ukraine) Ruslan Abiltarov	def.	(Russia) Valeriy Khazhirokov	Submission (Rear Naked Choke)	1	2:24	
Featherweight 66 kg	(Azerbaijan) Tural Ragimov	def.	(Japan) Taichi Nakajima	Decision (Unanimous)	3	5:00	
Heavyweight 120 kg	(Russia) Amirkhan Isagadzhiev	def.	(United States) D.J. Linderman	KO (Head Kick and Punches)	1	1:26	

== ACB KB 11 / Wu Lin Feng ==
ACB KB 11 / Wu Lin Feng
- Promotion: Absolute Championship Berkut
- Date: October 7, 2017
- Venue: Henan TV Studio 8
- City: Zhengzhou, China

Absolute Championship Berkut KB 11 / Wu Lin Feng was a kickboxing event held by Absolute Championship Berkut on October 7, 2017, at the Henan TV Studio 8 in Zhengzhou, China.

=== Background ===
Bonus awards:

The following fighters will be awarded $10,000 bonuses:

- Fight of the Night:
- Knockout of the Night:
- Submission of the Night:

=== Results ===
ACB KB 11 / WLF
Weight Class				Method	Round	Time	Notes
Cruiserweight 90 kg	(Belarus) Igor Bugaenko	def.	(China) Hao Guanghua	Decision (Unanimous)	3	3:00	
Lightweight 70 kg	(Thailand) Sitthichai Sitsongpeenong	def.	(Russia) Dzhabar Askerov	Decision (Unanimous)	3	3:00	Wu Lin Feng - Yi Long challenge Tournament, Final
Catchweight 67 kg	(South Sudan) Lofogo Sarour	def.	(China) Ji Xiang	Decision (Unanimous)	3	3:00	
Women Strawweight 52 kg	(China) Gong Yanli	def.	(Russia) Galina Popova	Decision (Unanimous)	3	3:00	
Lightweight 70 kg	(China) Song Shaoqiu	def.	(Russia) Vadim Davydov	Decision (Unanimous - Extra Round)	4	3:00	
Featherweight 66 kg	(Russia) Tamerlan Bashirov	def.	(China) Lu Jun	Decision (Unanimous)	3	3:00	
Catchweight 63 kg	(China) Jin Ying	def.	(Russia) Rodion Sheremet	Decision (Unanimous)	3	3:00	
Bantamweight 61 kg	(Russia) Timur Nadrov	def.	(China) Chen Wende	Decision (Unanimous)	3	3:00	

== ACB 72: Makovsky vs. Sherbatov ==
ACB 72: Makovsky vs. Sherbatov
- Promotion: Absolute Championship Berkut
- Date: October 14, 2017
- Venue: Tohu
- City: Montreal, Quebec, Canada
- Attendance: ~1000

Absolute Championship Berkut 72: Makovsky vs. Sherbatov will be a mixed martial arts event held by Absolute Championship Berkut on October 14, 2017, at the Tohu in Montreal, Quebec, Canada.

=== Background ===
Bonus awards:

The following fighters will be awarded $10,000 bonuses:

- Fight of the Night:
- Knockout of the Night:
- Submission of the Night:

=== Results ===
ACB 72
Weight Class				Method	Round	Time	Notes
Flyweight 57 kg	(Russia) Yoni Sherbatov	def.	(United States) Zach Makovsky	Decision (Unanimous)	3	5:00	
Lightweight 70 kg	(Canada) Jesse Ronson	def.	(Canada) Jeremie Capony	Submission (Rear Naked Choke)	2	1:20	
Bantamweight 61 kg	(Latvia) Edgars Skrīvers	def.	(Canada) Xavier Alaoui	Decision (Split)	3	5:00	
Heavyweight 120 kg	(Canada) Tanner Boser	def.	(United States) Dave Cryer	KO (Punches)	2	4:19	
Welterweight 77 kg	(Brazil) Davis dos Santos	def.	(England) Mark Glover	Decision (Unanimous)	3	5:00	
Featherweight 66 kg	(United States) Darren Smith	def.	(Brazil) Gleidson Cutis	Decision (Unanimous)	3	5:00	
Heavyweight 120 kg	(Canada) Bakary Sakho	def.	(Canada) Blake Nash	KO (Spinning Hook Kick)	1	1:32	

== ACB 73: Silva vs. Makoev ==
ACB 73: Silva vs. Makoev
- Promotion: Absolute Championship Berkut
- Date: October 21, 2017
- Venue: Miécimo da Silva Sports Complex
- City: Rio de Janeiro, Brazil

Absolute Championship Berkut 73: Silva vs. Makoev will be a mixed martial arts event held by Absolute Championship Berkut on October 21, 2017, at the Miécimo da Silva Sports Complex in Rio de Janeiro, Brazil.

=== Background ===
Bonus awards:

The following fighters will be awarded $10,000 bonuses:

- Knockout of the Night: Adlan Bataev
- Submission of the Night: Ary Farias
- $5000 Stoppage Victory Bonuses: Jose Maria Tome

=== Results ===
ACB 73
Weight Class				Method	Round	Time	Notes
Lightweight 70 kg	(Brazil) Leandro Silva	def.	(Russia) Islam Makoev	Decision (Unanimous)	3	5:00	
Light Heavyweight 93 kg	(Brazil) Carlos Eduardo	def.	(Brazil) Fábio Silva	Decision (Split)	3	5:00	
Featherweight 66 kg	(Russia) Adlan Bataev	def.	(Brazil) Adilson Ramos	KO (Punches)	1	1:46	
Welterweight 77 kg	(Brazil) Roberto Neves	def.	(Brazil) Adriano Capitulino	Decision (Unanimous)	3	5:00	
Featherweight 66 kg	(Brazil) Maike Linhares	def.	(Russia) Rustam Asuev	TKO (Retirement)	1	5:00	
Welterweight 77 kg	(Brazil) Wendell Oliveira	def.	(Brazil) João Carvalho	Decision (Unanimous)	3	5:00	
Welterweight 77 kg	(Russia) Imran Abaev	def.	(Brazil) Luiz Dutra Jr.	Decision (Unanimous)	3	5:00	
Flyweight 57 kg	(Brazil) Josiel Silva	def.	(Russia) Kurban Gadzhiev	Decision (Unanimous)	3	5:00	
Bantamweight 61 kg	(Brazil) Ary Farias	def.	(Brazil) Nilton Gavião	Submission (Rear Naked Choke)	2	1:17	
Flyweight 57 kg	(Brazil) José Maria Tomé	def.	(Brazil) Bruno Rodrigues	TKO (Kick to the Body and Punches)	2	2:00	
Lightweight 70 kg	(Brazil) Herbert Batista	def.	(Russia) Viskhan Magomadov	TKO (Retirement)	2	5:00	
Welterweight 77 kg	(Brazil) André Ricardo	def.	(Brazil) Renato Valente	TKO (Punches)	3	3:26	
Middleweight 84 kg	(Brazil) Gregory Rodrigues	def.	(Russia) Umar Gaisumov	TKO (Punches)	1	2:42	
Featherweight 66 kg	(Brazil) Taigro Costa	def.	(Brazil) Valdines Silva	Decision (Unanimous)	3	5:00	
Flyweight 57 kg	(Brazil) Alan Gomes	def.	(Russia) Shamil Akhmaev	TKO (Punches)	3	3:00	
Featherweight 66 kg	(Brazil) Antônio Carlos Ribeiro	def.	(Brazil) Fabiano Nogueira	Decision (Unanimous)	3	5:00	

== ACB KB 12: Warriors Of Light ==
ACB KB 12: Warriors Of Light
- Promotion: Absolute Championship Berkut
- Date: November 10, 2017
- Venue: Marriott Congress Center
- City: (United States) Los Angeles, California, USA

Absolute Championship Berkut KB 12: Warriors Of Light will be a kickboxing event held by Absolute Championship Berkut on November 10, 2017, at the Marriott Congress Center in Los Angeles, California, United States.

=== Background ===
Bonus awards:

The following fighters will be awarded $10,000 bonuses:

- Fight of the Night:
- Knockout of the Night:
- Submission of the Night:

=== Results ===
ACB KB 12
Weight Class				Method	Round	Time	Notes
Lightweight 70 kg	(South Sudan) Lofogo Sarour	def.	(United States) Josh Aragon	Decision (Unanimous)	3	3:00	
Welterweight 77 kg	(Azerbaijan) Perviz Abdullayev	def.	(Ghana) Godwin Afriyie	TKO (Ref. Stoppage)	3	1:31	
Bantamweight 60 kg	(Suriname) Gordon Kalaykhan	def.	(United States) Jake Lawry	Decision (Split)	3	3:00	
Welterweight 77 kg	(Russia) Islam Baibatyrov	def.	(United States) Matthew Martinez	KO (Head Kick)	1	0:26	
Light Heavyweight 95 kg	(Canada) Charles Bisset	def.	(United States) Moses Murrietta	Decision (Split)	3	3:00	
Lightweight 70 kg	(United States) Jermaine Soto	def.	(England) Nick Harding	Decision (Unanimous)	3	3:00	
Lightweight 70 kg	(United States) Joe LoCicero	def.	(United States) Ismael Hinojosa	KO (Head Kick)	2	2:56	

== ACB 74: Aguev vs. Townsend ==
ACB 74: Aguev vs. Townsend
- Promotion: Absolute Championship Berkut
- Date: November 18, 2017
- Venue: Wiener Stadthalle
- City: Vienna, Austria

Absolute Championship Berkut 74: Aguev vs. Townsend will be a mixed martial arts event held by Absolute Championship Berkut at the Wiener Stadthalle on November 18, 2017, in Vienna, Austria.

=== Background ===
ACB 74 was supposed to hold event in Dubau, United Arab Emirates but for unknown reasons was moved to Vienna, Austria.

Bonus awards:

The following fighters will be awarded $10,000 bonuses:

- Fight of the Night: Piotr Strus vs. Nikola Dipchikov
- Knockout of the Night: Ismail Naurdiev
- Submission of the Night: Darren Mima
- $5000 Stoppage Victory Bonuses: Stanislav Vlasenko, Lom-Ali Eskijew, Andrew Fisher, Thiago Silva, Mukhamed Aushev

=== Results ===
ACB 74
Weight Class				Method	Round	Time	Notes
Welterweight 77 kg	(Russia) Arbi Aguev	def.	(United States) Adam Townsend	Decision (Majority)	3	5:00	
Featherweight 84 kg	(Russia) Musa Khamanaev	def.	(Mexico) Efraín Escudero	Decision (Unanimous)	3	5:00	
Middleweight 84 kg	(Poland) Piotr Strus	def.	(Bulgaria) Nikola Dipchikov	Submission (Rear Naked Choke)	3	4:59	
Middleweight 84 kg	(Russia) Abdul-Rahman Dzhanaev	def.	(United States) Clifford Starks	Decision (Majority)	3	5:00	
Welterweight 77 kg	(Russia) Ismail Naurdiev	def.	(Bulgaria) Georgi Valentinov	KO (Head Kick And Punches)	1	3:10	
Middleweight 84 kg	(Russia) Mukhamed Aushev	def.	(Slovakia) Roland Čambal	TKO (Elbows and Punches)	1	3:25	
Light Heavyweight 93 kg	(Brazil) Thiago Silva	vs.	(Spain) Jose Daniel Toledo	TKO (Punches)	2	4:29	
Featherweight 66 kg	(England) Andrew Fisher	def.	(Armenia) Akop Stepanyan	TKO (Injury)	2	1:01	
Flyweight 57 kg	(United States) Darren Mima	def.	(Germany) Rany Saadeh	Submission (Guillotine Choke)	1	0:59	
Featherweight 66 kg	(Russia) Lom-Ali Eskijew	def.	(Brazil) Felipe Cruz	TKO (Punches)	1	1:34	
Welterweight 77 kg	(Russia) Stanislav Vlasenko	def.	(Austria) Dominik Schober	Submission (Rear Naked Choke)	2	1:28	
Lightweight 70 kg	(Brazil) Otávio dos Santos	def.	(Germany) Attila Korkmaz	Decision (Unanimous)	3	5:00	

== ACB 75: Gadzhidaudov vs. Zieliński ==
ACB 75: Gadzhidaudov vs. Zieliński
- Promotion: Absolute Championship Berkut
- Date: November 25, 2017
- Venue: Carl Benz Arena
- City: Stuttgart, Germany

Absolute Championship Berkut 75: Gadzhidaudov vs. Zieliński was a mixed martial arts event held by Absolute Championship Berkut on November 25, 2017, at the Carl Benz Arena in Stuttgart, Germany.

=== Background ===
Dennis Siver was set to make his ACB debut, but withdrew due to a shoulder injury. Beslan Isaev, Rasul Shovkhalov, and Shamil Shakbulatov were denied entry to Germany. So they were also removed from the card.

Bonus awards:

The following fighters were awarded $10,000 bonuses:

- Knockout of the Night: Dovletdzhan Yagshimuradov
- Submission of the Night: Aurel Pirtea
- $5000 Stoppage Victory Bonuses: Ustarmagomed Gadjidaudov, Brendan Loughnane

=== Results ===
ACB 75
Weight Class				Method	Round	Time	Notes
Lightweight 70 kg	(Russia) Ustarmagomed Gadzhidaudov	def.	(Poland) Adrian Zieliński	TKO (Knee and Punches)	1	1:17	
Lightweight 70 kg	(Romania) Aurel Pîrtea	def.	(Russia) Daud Shaikhaev	Submission (Guillotine Choke)	1	4:29	
Light Heavyweight 93 kg	(Turkmenistan) Dovletdzhan Yagshimuradov	def.	(Denmark) Joachim Christensen	KO (Punches)	1	1:14	
Lightweight 70 kg	(England) Brendan Loughnane	def.	(Georgia (country)) Paata Tschapelia	KO (Head Kick)	3	3:40	
Welterweight 77 kg	(Russia) Ramazan Kuramagomedov	def.	(Lithuania) Mindaugas Veržbickas	Decision (Unanimous)	3	5:00	
Middleweight 84 kg	(Brazil) Rafael Xavier	def.	(Kazakhstan) Umar Yankovski	Decision (Unanimous)	3	5:00	
Bantamweight 61 kg	(England) Coner Hignett	def.	(Switzerland) Frederico Gutzwiller	Submission (Heel Hook)	1	0:48	
Lightweight 70 kg	(Sweden) Jonathan Svensson	def.	(Germany) Shtegu Vrajolli	Submission (Guillotine Choke)	1	2:35	
Bantamweight 61 kg	(Italy) Luca Iovine	def.	(Germany) Oemer Cankardesler	Submission (Rear Naked Choke)	1	3:04	
Bantamweight 61 kg	(Denmark) Jonas Magard	def.	(Greece) Michail Chrisopoulus	Submission (Japanese Necktie)	1	2:35	

== ACB 76: Young Eagles 23 ==
ACB 76: Young Eagles 23
- Promotion: Absolute Championship Berkut
- Date: December 9, 2017
- Venue: Gold Coast Convention and Exhibition Centre
- City: Gold Coast, Queensland, Australia

Absolute Championship Berkut 76: Young Eagles 23 will be a mixed martial arts event held by Absolute Championship Berkut on December 9, 2017, at the Gold Coast Convention and Exhibition Centre in Gold Coast, Australia.

=== Background ===
Bonus awards:

The following fighters will be awarded $5,000 bonuses:

- Fight of the Night: Anthony Leone vs. Dean Garnett
- Knockout of the Night: Mohammed Alavi
- Submission of the Night: Trent Girdham
- $3000 Stoppage Victory Bonuses: Brett Cooper, Azamat Amagov, Michael Tobin, Shannon McClellan, Saeed Fatahfir, Johnny Walker

=== Results ===
ACB 76
Weight Class				Method	Round	Time	Notes
Welterweight 77 kg	(United States) Brett Cooper	def.	(Russia) Sharaf Davlatmurodov	TKO (Punches)	2	3:29	
Middleweight 84 kg	(Russia) Azamat Amagov	def.	(New Zealand) Dylan Andrews	TKO (Punches)	2	1:08	
Bantamweight 61 kg	(United States) Anthony Leone	def.	(England) Dean Garnett	Submission (Guillotine Choke)	2	4:40	
Featherweight 66 kg	(Australia) Michael Tobin	def.	(Malaysia) Sam Chan	Submission (Armbar)	1	2:00	
Bantamweight 61 kg	(Russia) Islam Yunusov	def.	(Northern Ireland) Alan Philpott	Decision (Unanimous)	3	5:00	
Featherweight 66 kg	(Brazil) Rodolfo Marques	def.	(Russia) Mehdi Baydulaev	Decision (Split)	3	5:00	
Lightweight 70 kg	(Russia) Bai-Ali Shaipov	def.	(New Zealand) Kieran Joblin	Decision (Split)	3	5:00	
Bantamweight 61 kg	(Australia) Trent Girdham	def.	(England) Tim Moore	Submission (Armbar)	2	4:30	
Flyweight 57 kg	(Australia) Shannon McClellan	def.	(England) Ste Neitingeil	TKO (Punches)	1	3:51	
Welterweight 77 kg	(Australia) Saeed Fatahfir	def.	(Australia) Ty Duncan	KO (Punch to the Body)	1	2:35	
Featherweight 66 kg	(Australia) Johnny Walker	def.	(South Africa) Justin Van Heerden	Submission (Rear Naked Choke)	1	4:20	
Featherweight 66 kg	(Australia) Diego Pereira	def.	(New Zealand) Kairin Moses	Decision (Split)	3	5:00	
Lightweight 66 kg	(Australia) Daniel Hill	def.	(Australia) Gavin Hain	TKO (Doctor Stoppage)	2	5:00	
Lightweight 66 kg	(Australia) Mohammed Alavi	def.	(Australia) Eben Cox	KO (Head Kick)	1	0:48	

== ACB 77: Abdulvakhabov vs. Vartanyan 2 ==
ACB 77: Abdulvakhabov vs. Vartanyan
- Promotion: Absolute Championship Berkut
- Date: December 23, 2017
- Venue: Luzhniki Palace of Sports
- City: Moscow, Russia
- Attendance: 7554
- Total gate: $310,000

Absolute Championship Berkut 77: Abdulvakhabov vs. Vartanyan 2 will be a mixed martial arts event held by Absolute Championship Berkut on December 23, 2017, at the Luzhniki Palace of Sports in Moscow, Russia.

=== Background ===
Bonus awards:

The following fighters were awarded $10,000 bonuses:

- Fight of the Night: Alexey Polpudnikov vs. Arman Ospanov
- Knockout of the Night: Cory Hendricks
- Submission of the Night: Ali Eskiev
- $5000 Stoppage Victory Bonuses: Sergei Bilostenniy, Gamzat Khiramagomedov, Asylzhan Bakhytzhanuly, Denis Goltsov, Yusuf Raisov and Albert Duraev

=== Results ===
ACB 77
Weight Class				Method	Round	Time	Notes
Lightweight 70 kg	(Russia) Abdul-Aziz Abdulvakhabov (c)	def.	(Russia) Eduard Vartanyan (ic)	Decision (Split)	5	5:00	For the Unification of ACB Lightweight Championship
Middleweight 84 kg	(Russia) Albert Duraev	def.	(Russia) Vyacheslav Vasilevsky	TKO (Punches)	1	3:47	For the Vacant ACB Middleweight Championship
Featherweight 66 kg	(Russia) Yusuf Raisov	def.	(Russia) Alexander Peduson	Submission (Rear Naked Choke)	2	4:23	For the Interim ACB Featherweight Championship
Heavyweight 120 kg	(Russia) Denis Goltsov	def.	(United States) Chase Gormley	KO (Punch)	2	2:16	
Welterweight 77 kg	(Russia) Beslan Isaev	def.	(United States) Nah-Shon Burrell	Decision (Majority)	3	5:00	
Featherweight 66 kg	(Russia) Alexey Polpudnikov	def.	(Kazakhstan) Arman Ospanov	Decision (Split)	3	5:00	
Lightweight 70 kg	(Russia) Amirkhan Adaev	def.	(United States) Darren Smith	Decision (Unanimous)	3	5:00	
Light Heavyweight 93 kg	(Kazakhstan) Asylzhan Bakhytzhanuly	def.	(Russia) Muslim Makhmudov	TKO (Elbows)	2	3:37	
Middleweight 84 kg	(Russia) Gamzat Khiramagomedov	def.	(Russia) Aleksei Butorin	Submission (Guillotine Choke)	1	2:59	
Light Heavyweight 93 kg	(United States) Cory Hendricks	def.	(Russia) Konstantin Erokhin	KO (Head Kick and Punches)	1	0:30	
Welterweight 77 kg	(Russia) Ali Eskiev	def.	(Russia) Rustam Gadzhiev	Submission (Rear Naked Choke)	2	3:48	
Heavyweight 120 kg	(Russia) Sergei Bilostenniy	def.	(Russia) Amirhan Isagadzhiev	TKO (Punches)	1	0:15	
Flyweight 57 kg	(Russia) Mansur Khatuev	def.	(Brazil) Maycon Silvan	Decision (Unanimous)	3	5:00	
