= Niklas Bäckström (fighter) =

Swedish mixed martial artist

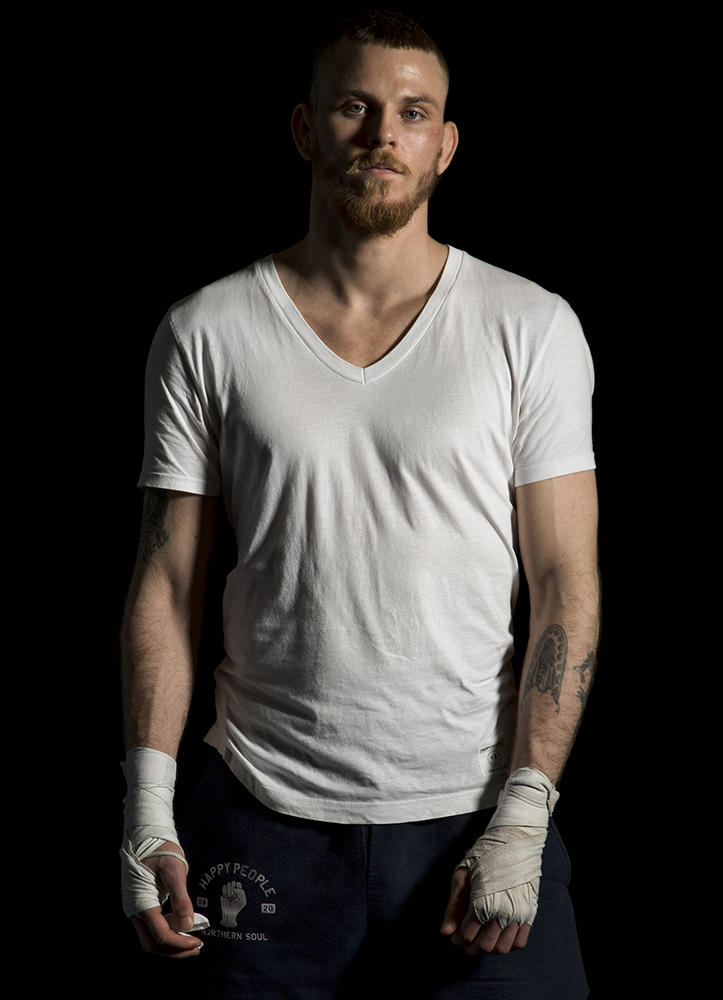
- Niklas Bäckström at Allstars Training Center
- Born: 22 August 1989 (age 37); Luleå, Sweden
- Other names: King in the North, Nefarious, Normal, Golden Boy
- Nationality: Swedish
- Height: 6 ft 0 in (1.83 m)
- Weight: 145 lb (66 kg; 10 st 5 lb)
- Division: Featherweight (2009–present); Lightweight (2016)
- Reach: 73 in (185 cm)
- Style: Kickboxing, Boxing, Submission Wrestling
- Fighting out of: Luleå, Sweden
- Team: Northpaw Fightcenter & Gym
- Rank: Purple belt in Brazilian Jiu-Jitsu
- Years active: 2009–present

Mixed martial arts record
- Total: 16
- Wins: 11
- By knockout: 4
- By submission: 4
- By decision: 3
- Losses: 4
- By knockout: 1
- By decision: 3
- No contests: 1

Amateur record
- Total: 2
- Wins: 2
- By submission: 2

Other information
- Mixed martial arts record from Sherdog

Niklas Bäckström (Swedish: [ˈnɪ̌kːlas ˈbɛ̂kːstrœm]; born August 22, 1989) is a Swedish mixed martial arts fighter who competes in the Lightweight and Featherweight divisions. He has previously competed in the Ultimate Fighting Championship.

== Biography ==
Bäckström began training Jujutsu at the age of 10. At 14 he also began Boxing and Wrestling in his hometown Luleå. After high school he moved to Stockholm and took up Mixed martial arts.

== Mixed martial arts career ==
=== Early career ===
Bäckström started his martial arts career as a competitor in Submission wrestling and Brazilian Jiu-Jitsu. He was awarded his BJJ purple belt after winning a Swedish tournament in 2008, he also competed in Shootfighting with a record of 2-0, before starting his professional MMA career in 2009.

After staying undefeated following his first three professional bouts, Bäckström signed with the British promotion Cage Warriors. He made his promotional debut against Adam Edwards, on April 24, 2011 at CWFC 41, he won the fight by unanimous decision. He was later expected to face top Irish prospect and future UFC fighter Conor McGregor on September 8, 2011, at CWFC: Fight Night 2. However, Bäckström was forced out of the bout with a broken hand, and was replaced by Aron Jahnsen.

Bäckström then continued to fight on the European circuit and by 2014 he had racked up a record of 7-0 1 NC, with 4 victories by TKO and 1 by submission, including a unanimous decision win over Sergej Grecicho and a 15-second TKO over Max Coga, before getting the call from the UFC.

=== Ultimate Fighting Championship ===
On May 15, 2014, it was revealed that Bäckström had signed a contract with the UFC.

He made his debut on short notice, replacing an injured Thiago Tavares against Tom Niinimäki on May 31, 2014 at UFC Fight Night 41. Despite coming in as a slight underdog, Bäckström won the fight by submission in the first round. He was also awarded a Performance of the Night bonus for his efforts.

Bäckström faced Mike Wilkinson on October 4, 2014 at UFC Fight Night 53. He lost the fight via knockout in the first round.

Bäckström faced Noad Lahat on June 20, 2015 at UFC Fight Night 69 He lost the back and forth fight by majority decision (28-28, 28-29, 28-29). However, on the MMA media scorecards, most had scored the fight a draw, with Bäckström winning round one and three 10-9 and losing round two 10-8, making the score 28-28.

In late August, 2015 it was announced, surprisingly to some, that Bäckström had been released from the promotion.

=== Post-UFC; Independent promotions ===
In his first fight since his UFC stint, Bäckström fought Bulgarian veteran Georgi Stoyanov on November 28, 2015 in the headliner at the Battle of Botnia 2015-event, close to his hometown in North Sweden. He won the fight by submission due to a rear-naked choke in the first round.

Since his BAMMA-debut was postponed (see below), Bäckström instead took a short notice fight against Danijel Kokora on June 4, 2016 at Scandinavian Fight Nights 1. The bout was contested at lightweight, with Bäckström moving up and Kokora moving down in weight. He won the fight by submission due to a rear-naked choke in the first round.

Bäckström faced Joni Salovaara on November 26, 2016 in the headliner at Cage 37. Despite suffering a broken hand, he won the fight by unanimous decision.

He was then set to face Tim Wilde on June 14, 2017 in the main event at Tanko FC 5. The fight would get scrapped from the card a little more than a week before the event, due to Wilde having issues making the weight.

=== BAMMA ===
On April 11, 2016 it was revealed that Bäckström had signed with British promotion BAMMA. He was expected to make his promotional debut on June 4, 2016 at BAMMA 26. No opponent was announced. He was later set to face Attila Korkmaz at the same event which had been postponed to September 10, 2016. However, the matchup was later scrapped from the card altogether. Following the postponing of his first two bookings, he instead fought for other promotions during that timeframe (see above).

Bäckströms promotional debut was then set to be against Brian Moore on December 16, 2016 at BAMMA 27 which was a card co-promoted by BAMMA and Bellator. It was later revealed that Bäckström instead would be facing Ronnie Mann, and it would be a fight for the BAMMA featherweight title. However, Bäckström had to pull out of the fight due to an injury. The injury was a broken hand that he suffered in a fight which he took after his previously booked fight in BAMMA had been canceled. He was replaced by Martin Stapleton.

=== Absolute Championship Berkut ===
Bäckström was first expected to face Thiago Tavares on July 22, 2017 at ACB 65. However, Tavares was forced to withdraw from the bout due to an injury and was replaced by Andrew Fisher. He lost the fight by unanimous decision.

=== Konfrontacja Sztuk Walki ===
Bäckström made his return from 4.5 year lay off against Sebastian Rajewski on January 15, 2022 at KSW 66. He lost the bout via unanimous decision.

== Championships and accomplishments ==
=== Mixed Martial Arts ===
- Ultimate Fighting Championship
  - Performance of the Night (One time) vs. Tom Niinimäki
- Nordic MMA Awards – MMAViking.com
  - 2014 Submission of the Year vs. Tom Niinimäki (UFC Fight Night 41)

=== Submission Grapling ===
- 2008 Västerås Cup 4 Open Weight BJJ Tournament 3rd place
- 2010 Swedish National Submission Wrestling Lightweight Tournament 3rd place
- 2012 Swedish National Submission Wrestling Lightweight Tournament 1st place

== Mixed martial arts record ==
Professional record breakdown
16 matches	11 wins	4 losses
By knockout	4	1
By submission	4	0
By decision	3	3
No contests	1	

Res.	Record	Opponent	Method	Event	Date	Round	Time	Location	Notes
Loss	11–4 (1)	Sebastian Rajewski	Decision (unanimous)	KSW 66: Ziółkowski vs. Mańkowski	January 15, 2022	3	5:00	Szczecin, Poland	Lightweight bout.
Loss	11–3 (1)	Andrew Fisher	Decision (unanimous)	ACB 65: Silva vs. Agnaev	July 22, 2017	3	5:00	Sheffield, England	
Win	11–2 (1)	Joni Salovaara	Decision (unanimous)	Cage 37: Bäckström vs. Salovaara	November 26, 2016	3	5:00	Helsinki, Finland	
Win	10–2 (1)	Danijel Kokora	Submission (rear-naked choke)	Scandinavian Fight Nights 1	June 4, 2016	1	N/A	Solna, Sweden	Lightweight bout.
Win	9–2 (1)	Georgi Stoyanov	Submission (rear-naked choke)	Battle of Botnia 2015	November 28, 2015	1	4:15	Umeå, Sweden	
Loss	8–2 (1)	Noad Lahat	Decision (majority)	UFC Fight Night: Jedrzejczyk vs. Penne	June 20, 2015	3	5:00	Berlin, Germany	
Loss	8–1 (1)	Mike Wilkinson	KO (punches)	UFC Fight Night: Nelson vs. Story	October 4, 2014	1	1:19	Stockholm, Sweden	
Win	8–0 (1)	Tom Niinimaki	Submission (bulldog choke)	UFC Fight Night: Munoz vs. Mousasi	May 31, 2014	1	4:15	Berlin, Germany	Performance of the Night.
Win	7–0 (1)	Max Coga	TKO (front kick and punches)	Europa MMA: Coga vs. Bäckström	March 22, 2014	1	0:15	Brentwood, England	
Win	6–0 (1)	Jaakko Vayrynen	TKO (knee and punches)	Lappeenranta Fight Night 9	October 19, 2013	2	0:58	Kuopio, Finland	
Win	5–0 (1)	Thomas Hytten	TKO (punches)	Vision FC Fight Night 1	May 5, 2012	2	N/A	Karlstad, Sweden	
Win	4–0 (1)	Sergej Grecicho	Decision (unanimous)	Botnia Punishment 11	March 23, 2012	3	5:00	Seinäjoki, Finland	
Win	3–0 (1)	Adam Edwards	Decision (unanimous)	Cage Warriors: 41	April 24, 2011	3	5:00	London, England	
NC	2–0 (1)	Elias Kunnas	No Contest	Artic Fight 3	March 19, 2011	1	N/A	Rovaniemi, Finland	Bout ruled a No Contest in round 1 for undisclosed reasons.
Win	2–0	Simon Sköld	TKO (punches)	Superior Challenge 6	October 29, 2010	3	3:23	Stockholm, Sweden	
Win	1–0	Gabriel Mboge Nesje	Submission (rear-naked choke)	Superior Challenge 4	October 31, 2009	1	2:30	Stockholm, Sweden	

== Amateur mixed martial arts record ==
Professional record breakdown
2 matches	2 wins	0 losses
By knockout	0	0
By submission	2	0
By decision	0	0

Res.	Record	Opponent	Method	Event	Date	Round	Time	Location	Notes
Win	2–0	Jonas Forssell	Submission (rear-naked choke)	Swedish Shootfighting League 07: Umeå Martial Arts Festival	November 10, 2007	2	1:21	Umeå, Sweden	
Win	1–0	Victor Garabedian	Submission (rear-naked choke)	Swedish Shootfighting League 07: Shoot Challenge 2	September 29, 2007	1	1:23	Stockholm, Sweden	

== See also ==
- List of current UFC fighters
- List of male mixed martial artists
