= Ali Bagov =

Russian mixed martial artist (born 1990)

- Born: Oleg Bagov; February 12, 1990 (age 36); Baksan, North Caucasus, Russia
- Native name: Багъ Алий
- Other names: Hulk
- Height: 5 ft 9 in (1.75 m)
- Weight: 156 lb (71 kg; 11 st 2 lb)
- Division: Lightweight; Welterweight
- Reach: 71 in (180 cm)
- Fighting out of: Nalchik, Russia
- Team: Fightspirit Team
- Years active: 2009–present

Mixed martial arts record
- Total: 49
- Wins: 35
- By knockout: 4
- By submission: 24
- By decision: 7
- Losses: 13
- By knockout: 8
- By submission: 1
- By decision: 4
- No contests: 1

Other information
- Mixed martial arts record from Sherdog

Ali Bagov (Adyghe: Багъ Алий; born February 12, 1990) is a Russian mixed martial artist who competes in the Lightweight and Welterweight divisions of the Absolute Championship Akhmat (ACA). Fight Matrix had him ranked a top 10 lightweight in the world in August 2022. He is ranked #3 in the ACA Lightweight rankings.

== Background ==
Ali Bagov was born on December 2, 1990, in the city of Baksan, Republic of Kabardino-Balkaria. At the age of 19, the fighter began his career in professional MMA. In the same year, the young athlete won "gold" at the Combat Sambo Championship of the Southern Federal District, which was held in Maykop, Krasnodar Territory. In the same year in Yaroslavl, Bagov became the Champion of Russia in the Oriental. As soon as Bagov turned 18, he decides to move to MMA.

In the next 2010 in Moscow, the fighter took the top step of the podium at the ADCC Russian Grappling Championship class: A. In the same year, in Beslan, he became the Winner of the Combat Sambo Championship of the North Caucasus Federal District. At the end of 2010 in Nalchik, Ali Bagov won the title of Champion of Russia in FCF-MMA. Two years later, the athlete repeated his success by winning the Championship of the All-Russian Combat Sambo Tournament in the city of Nazran.

== Mixed martial arts career ==
=== Early career ===
Ali began his professional career in MMA at the age of 19. Then, in 2009, Bagov managed to win an enchanting victory at the combat sambo championship among athletes of the Southern Federal District, which was held in the capital of Adygea, Maykop. In the same year, Ali participated in the Russian Oriental Championship, held in Yaroslavl, and turned out to be a triumph there.

Bagov faced future UFC Lightweight Champion Khabib Nurmagomedov on June 10, 2010, at Golden First of Russia 1. Having a competitive bout with Khabib, Khabib successfully took advantage of the ruleset allowing headbutts, using multiple of them to inflict damage on Bagov from on top, winning the bout against Bagov via unanimous decision. After that fight, Khabib and Ali became very close friends and even started training together.

At the invitation of Nurmagomedov, Bagov began to train in Dagestan. The local wrestlers suggested that Oleg take the Caucasian name Ali, and he agreed. From that moment on, he became better known as Ali Bagov.

=== Absolute Championship Akhmat ===
In 2014, Bagov signed a contract with the largest Chechen promotion ACB (Absolute Championship Berkut), where for the first time he performed at the ACB 2 tournament and defeated Akhmed Mirzaev in the first round via anaconda choke. This was followed by performances at ACB 5 and ACB 7, where Bagov won confident victories with first round submissions. At ACB 9, Bagov lost by spinning back kick knockout in the 3rd round to Abdul-Aziz Abdulvakhabov, starting a long term rivalry with him.

After that, Bagov decided to move clubs to Berkut Club and a series of 8 victories in a row followed and Ali Bagov went out for revenge with Abdul-Aziz Abdulvakhabov. However, the 2nd duel was again not in his favor. At the ACB 48 tournament in October 2016, he lost by technical knockout, as he refused to continue the fight after the 1st round.

Another important rival for Bagov was Eduard Vartanyan. They first met him in battle in 2014 in a sambo competition at World Combat Sambo Federation: World Cup 2014, where Ali lost to his opponent by technical knockout in the first round. A year later at ACB 22, he was able to take revenge and defeated Edward with a first round rear-naked choke. At the beginning of March 2018, it was announced that the fighters would again face each other in a fight in early May 2018. However, while preparing for the fight, Vartanyan injured his knee and for some time was forced to move on crutches.

Bagov faced American fighter and Bellator veteran Bubba Jenkins on 11 March 2017 at ACB 54. He won the fight by technical submission in the second round.

Bagov faced Leandro Silva at ACB 80: Tumenov vs. Burrell on February 16, 2018. He won the fight via unanimous decision.

After this fight, Bagov wins 3 victories in a row, Bagov challenged Gleristone Santos at ACB 86 on May 5, 2018. After the instructions, the duel began and the Bagov literally rushed at the Brazilian and after a successful takedown, Bagov began to ground and pound Santos, finishing the Brazilian in the first round via TKO stoppage.

After defeating the Brazilian, Bagov was given another chance against Abdul-Aziz Abdulvakhabov for the ACA Lightweight Championship on September 8, 2018, at ACB 89. In the fight, Ali immediately at the beginning of the fight held a takedown on Abdulvakhabov and actively worked throughout the first and second rounds! In the third round, after the transfer of the Chechen to the ground, Bagov simply did not let him get up and every attempt of the Chechen fighter to stand up ended with another transfer to the ground from Ali. Despite Abdulvakhabov making a comeback in the later round, Bagov won the majority decision on the judges scorecard and the ACA Lightweight Title.

On September 27, 2019, Bagov defended his title for the first time, facing Khusein Khaliev in the main event of ACA 99. Bagov would go on to defeat his opponent via kimura in the fourth round.

Moving up to welterweight and relinquishing the ACA Lightweight Championship, after Bagov won his bout against Adam Townsend at ACA 104 via unanimous decision, Bagov challenged Murad Abdulaev on September 5, 2020, at ACA 110 for the vacant ACA Welterweight Championship, losing the bout via unanimous decision.

Attempting to rebound from the loss, Bagov faced Elias Silvério at ACA 117: Bagov vs. Silvério on February 12, 2021. He won the fight via unanimous decision.

Bagov would go on to win his next two bouts, defeating Tilek Mashrapov at ACA 125 via kimura submission in the third round and Andrey Koshkin at ACA 134 via unanimous decision.

Bagov announced that he was returning to lightweight and entering the ACA Lightweight Grand Prix, with his first opponent being Rashid Magomedov with the semifinal bout taking place on July 22, 2022, at ACA 141. The bout ended in a no contest after the president of ACA, Mairbek Khasiev, stopped the bout after the fourth round due to inactivity from both fighters. After Khasiev announced that he wouldn't pay the fighters their purses, Bagov announced that he would leave the promotion if he didn't receive his fee.

Bagov faced Daud Shaikhaev on March 17, 2023, at ACA 154: Vakhaev vs Goncharov, losing the bout via split decision.

In the semi-finals of the 2023 ACA Lightweight Grand Prix, Bagov faced Artem Reznikov on December 24, 2023, at ACA 168: Gadzhidaudov vs. Tumenov, winning the bout via fourth round ground and pound elbows.

== Championships and accomplishments ==
=== Mixed martial arts ===
- Absolute Championship Akhmat
  - ACA Lightweight Championship (One time)
    - One successful title defence
  - 2015 ACB Lightweight Grand Prix

== Mixed martial arts record ==
Professional record breakdown
49 matches	35 wins	13 losses
By knockout	4	8
By submission	24	1
By decision	7	4
No contests	1	

Res.	Record	Opponent	Method	Event	Date	Round	Time	Location	Notes
Loss	35–13 (1)	Iskandar Mamadaliev	Decision (split)	ACA 200	February 6, 2026	3	5:00	Moscow, Russia	Welterweight bout; Mamadaliev missed weight (175.7 lb).
Win	35–12 (1)	Davi Ramos	TKO (punches)	ACA 194	October 23, 2025	2	2:39	Dubai, United Arab Emirates	Catchweight (165 lb) bout.
Loss	34–12 (1)	Abdul-Aziz Abdulvakhabov	KO (punch)	ACA 189	July 11, 2025	2	1:11	Grozny, Russia	2023 ACA Lightweight Grand Prix Final. For the ACA Lightweight Championship.
Win	34–11 (1)	Daud Shaikhaev	Decision (unanimous)	ACA 177	June 28, 2024	5	5:00	Sochi, Russia	2023 ACA Lightweight Grand Prix Semifinal.
Win	33–11 (1)	Artem Reznikov	TKO (elbows)	ACA 168	December 24, 2023	4	4:13	Moscow, Russia	2023 ACA Lightweight Grand Prix Quarterfinal.
Loss	32–11 (1)	Daud Shaikhaev	Decision (split)	ACA 154	March 17, 2023	3	5:00	Krasnodar, Russia	Catchweight (159.3 lb) bout; Bagov missed weight.
NC	32–10 (1)	Rashid Magomedov	NC (lack of activity)	ACA 141	July 22, 2022	4	5:00	Sochi, Russia	Return to Lightweight. 2022 ACA Lightweight Grand Prix Quarterfinal.
Win	32–10	Andrey Koshkin	Decision (unanimous)	ACA 134	December 17, 2021	5	5:00	Krasnodar, Russia	
Win	31–10	Tilek Mashrapov	Submission (kimura)	ACA 125	June 29, 2021	3	3:33	Sochi, Russia	
Win	30–10	Elias Silvério	Decision (unanimous)	ACA 117	February 12, 2021	3	5:00	Sochi, Russia	
Loss	29–10	Murad Abdulaev	Decision (unanimous)	ACA 110	September 5, 2020	5	5:00	Moscow, Russia	For the vacant ACA Welterweight Championship.
Win	29–9	Adam Townsend	Decision (unanimous)	ACA 104	February 21, 2020	3	4:01	Krasnodar, Russia	Return to Welterweight.
Win	28–9	Khusein Khaliev	Submission (kimura)	ACA 99	September 27, 2019	4	3:41	Moscow, Russia	Defended the ACA Lightweight Championship.
Win	27–9	Abdul-Aziz Abdulvakhabov	Decision (majority)	ACB 89	September 8, 2018	3	5:00	Krasnodar, Russia	Won the ACB Lightweight Championship.
Win	26–9	Gleristone Santos	TKO (punches and elbows)	ACB 86	May 5, 2018	1	3:47	Moscow, Russia	
Win	25–9	Leandro Silva	Decision (unanimous)	ACB 80	February 16, 2018	3	5:00	Krasnodar, Russia	
Win	24–9	Herdeson Batista	Decision (unanimous)	ACB 71	September 30, 2017	3	5:00	Moscow, Russia	
Win	23–9	Bubba Jenkins	Technical Submission (inverted triangle choke)	ACB 54	March 1, 2017	2	4:01	Manchester, England	Catchweight (160 lb) bout. Submission of the Night.
Loss	22–9	Abdul-Aziz Abdulvakhabov	TKO (retirement)	ACB 48	October 22, 2016	1	5:00	Moscow, Russia	For the ACB Lightweight Championship.
Win	22–8	Renat Lyatifov	KO (punches)	ACB 38	May 20, 2016	1	0:47	Rostov-on-Don, Russia	
Win	21–8	Artur Lemos	Submission (rear-naked choke)	ACB 31	March 9, 2016	1	3:49	Grozny, Russia	
Win	20–8	Eduard Vartanyan	Submission (rear-naked choke)	ACB 22	September 12, 2015	1	1:16	Saint Petersburg, Russia	Won the 2015 ACB Lightweight Grand Prix.
Win	19–8	Jakub Kowalewicz	Submission (armbar)	ACB 19	May 30, 2015	1	1:11	Kaliningrad, Russia	2015 ACB Lightweight Grand Prix Semifinal.
Win	18–8	Thiago Meller	Submission (guillotine choke)	ACB 15	March 21, 2015	1	2:51	Nalchik, Russia	2015 ACB Lightweight Grand Prix Quarterfinal.
Win	17–8	Radzh Khizriev	Submission	RMAU: Battle of the Champions 7	November 21, 2014	1	N/A	Moscow, Russia	Welterweight bout.
Win	16–8	Georgi Stoyanov	Submission (armbar)	ACB 11	November 14, 2014	1	4:43	Grozny, Russia	
Win	15–8	Kirill Sukhomlinov	Submission (triangle choke)	ProFC 54	September 7, 2014	2	2:05	Rostov-on-Don, Russia	Welterweight bout.
Loss	14–8	Abdul-Aziz Abdulvakhabov	KO (spinning back kick)	ACB 9	June 22, 2014	3	3:36	Grozny, Russia	2014 ACB Lightweight Grand Prix Final. For the inaugural ACB Lightweight Championship.
Win	14–7	Khamzat Dalgiev	Submission (triangle choke)	M-1 Challenge 49	June 7, 2014	1	0:52	Dzheyrakh, Russia	
Win	13–7	Rustam Bogotov	Submission (heel hook)	ACB 7	May 18, 2014	1	0:20	Grozny, Russia	2014 ACB Lightweight Grand Prix Semifinal.
Win	12–7	Rasul Mansurov	Submission (triangle choke)	ACB 5	April 6, 2014	1	1:04	Grozny, Russia	2014 ACB Lightweight Grand Prix Quarterfinal.
Win	11–7	Akhmed Mirzaev	Submission (anaconda choke)	ACB 2	March 9, 2014	1	1:01	Grozny, Russia	Return to Lightweight. 2014 ACB Lightweight Grand Prix Round of 16.
Loss	10–7	Renat Lyatifov	TKO (retirement)	Fightspirit Championship 1	September 8, 2013	1	5:00	Kolpino, Russia	
Win	10–6	Viktor Tchernetsky	Submission (arm-triangle choke)	Fight Nights: Battle of Moscow 12	June 20, 2013	1	0:30	Moscow, Russia	Return to Welterweight.
Loss	9–6	Georgi Stoyanov	TKO (retirement)	M-1 Challenge 40	June 8, 2013	1	5:00	Dzheyrakh, Russia	
Win	9–5	Magomed Radzhabov	Submission (armbar)	Cup Of St. Petersburg 2013	March 31, 2013	1	1:17	Saint Petersburg, Russia	Return to Lightweight.
Loss	8–5	Magomedrasul Khasbulaev	KO (punch)	League S-70: Russian Grand Prix 2011 (Stage 4)	May 25, 2012	2	1:57	Moscow, Russia	2012 S-70 Russian Welterweight Tournament Semifinal.
Loss	8–4	Fabiano de Melo	KO (knee to the body)	Revolution Fighting Champion 1	March 9, 2012	2	3:59	Beirut, Lebanon	
Win	8–3	Murad Yusupov	Submission (triangle choke)	League S-70: Russian Grand Prix 2011 (Stage 1)	December 22, 2011	1	1:10	Volgograd, Russia	2012 S-70 Russian Welterweight Tournament Quarterfinal.
Win	7–3	Talekh Aliev	Submission (triangle choke)	ProFC 29: Union Nation Cup (Stage 16)	July 2, 2011	1	1:25	Rostov-on-Don, Russia	Return to Welterweight.
Win	6–3	Yuriy Kelekhsaev	Submission (triangle choke)	FCF-MMA: Absolute Cup 2011	May 15, 2011	1	0:59	Nalchik, Russia	
Win	5–3	Sergey Golyaev	Submission (rear-naked choke)	ProFC 23: Union Nation Cup (Stage 11)	December 25, 2010	1	4:54	Bobruisk, Belarus	
Win	4–3	Vladimir Simonyan	Submission (rear-naked choke)	ProFC 18: Union Nation Cup (Stage 9)	October 21, 2010	1	1:02	Nalchik, Russia	
Win	3–3	Khizri Radzhabov	Submission (anaconda choke)	IAFC: Caucasus Cup 3	June 18, 2010	1	0:30	Russia	Return to Lightweight.
Loss	2–3	Kirill Sukhomlinov	TKO (arm injury)	Legion Fight: Black Sea Cup 2010 (Stage 1)	June 18, 2010	1	2:15	Anapa, Russia	
Loss	2–2	Khabib Nurmagomedov	Decision (unanimous)	Golden Fist Of Russia 1	June 10, 2010	2	5:00	Moscow, Russia	Return to Welterweight.
Loss	2–1	Alexander Butenko	Submission (rear-naked choke)	Global Battle 3	November 27, 2009	2	N/A	Perm, Russia	Lightweight debut. Global Battle Lightweight Grand Prix Final.
Win	2–0	Ramazan Emeev	Submission (triangle choke)	Global Battle 2	October 24, 2009	1	1:30	Perm, Russia	Won the Global Battle Welterweight Grand Prix.
Win	1–0	Rustam Thagabsoev	Submission (triangle choke)	Global Battle 2	October 24, 2009	1	1:09	Perm, Russia	Welterweight debut. Global Battle Welterweight Grand Prix Semifinal.

== See also ==
- List of current ACA fighters
- List of male mixed martial artists
