= Magomedrasul Khasbulaev =

Russian mixed martial artist (born 1986)

- Born: October 23, 1986 (age 40); Makhachkala, Dagestan ASSR, Russian SFSR, Soviet Union
- Native name: Магомедрасул Хасбулаев
- Other names: Frodo
- Nationality: Russian
- Height: 5 ft 7 in (1.70 m)
- Weight: 145 lb (66 kg; 10.4 st)
- Division: Featherweight; Lightweight; Welterweight
- Reach: 70 in (178 cm)
- Style: Combat Sambo
- Fighting out of: Derbent, Dagestan, Russia
- Team: Greg Jackson; Champion Club Derbent; ARMOR Makhachkala; SC Bazarganova
- Trainer: Greg Jackson; Shamil Zavurov; Abdulmanap Nurmagomedov
- Rank: International Master of Sports in Sambo
- Years active: 2009–2022

Mixed martial arts record
- Total: 42
- Wins: 34
- By knockout: 10
- By submission: 16
- By decision: 8
- Losses: 8
- By submission: 4
- By decision: 4

Other information
- Notable relatives: Shamil Zavurov, cousin
- Mixed martial arts record from Sherdog

Magomedrasul Khasbulaev
Medal record

Representing Russia

Men's Combat Sambo

World Championships
Gold medal – first place	2010 Kyiv	-82 kg

Russian Championships
Gold medal – first place	2009 St. Petersburg	-82 kg

Magomedrasul Magomedalievich Khasbulaev (Russian: Магомедрасул Магомедалиевич Хасбулаев; born October 23, 1986) is a Russian former mixed martial artist who fought in the Featherweight division. In a career spanning 12 years, Khasbulaev fought in Bellator MMA, where he won the Bellator Season Eight Featherweight Tournament Championship, and in ACA, where he was the former ACA Featherweight Champion. Khasbulaev is a Combat Sambo Russia National Champion.

== Mixed martial arts career ==
=== Early career ===
Khasbulaev made his professional debut in April 2009, his coach was his brother, Shamil Zavurov.

Khasbulaev reached tournament final where he lost to Shamil Zavurov via submission (rear-naked choke) in the first round.

Khasbulaev faced Daniel Weichel on March 5, 2011, at M-1 Challenge XXIII: Grishin vs Guram. He lost via submission (triangle choke) in the first round.

=== Bellator MMA ===
In July Khasbulaev signed with the Bellator Fighting Championships.

In his North American debut, Khasbulaev faced Nayeb Hezam on October 12, 2012, at Bellator 76. He won the fight via KO in the first round.

Khasbulaev quickly returned to the cage for Bellator as he fought less than a month later at Bellator 79 on November 2, 2012. He defeated Josh Pulsifer by rear-naked choke submission in the first round.

Khasbulaev faced Fabricio Guerreiro in Featherweight Tournament on February 7, 2013, at Bellator 88. He won the fight via submission in the second round.

Khasbulaev faced Marlon Sandro in the Bellator Season Eight Featherweight Tournament on March 7, 2013, at Bellator 92. After two rounds of total domination, he won the fight via TKO in the third round. He will now meet Mike Richman in the finals.

Khasbulaev faced Mike Richman in the finals of the Bellator Season Eight Featherweight Tournament on April 4, 2013, at Bellator 95. He won the fight via unanimous decision and will now have a shot at the Featherweight Champion later in 2014.

After many visa issues, he was released from Bellator.

=== World Series of Fighting ===
On 22 April 2015 Khasbulaev signed with the WSOF. Khasbulaev was expected to face former WSOF featherweight champion Rick Glenn on June 5, 2015, at WSOF 21. However, Glenn pulled out of the fight due to an undisclosed injury.

=== Absolute Championship Berkut ===
After injury Khasbulaev signed with the ACB.

Khasbulaev was expected to face Brazilian Antonio Magno Pereira on September 12, 2015, at ACB 22: St. Petersburg. He won by submission in the first round.

Khasbulaev faced Eduard Vartanyan on December 19, 2015, at ACB 27: Dushanbe. He lost this fight via unanimous decision.

=== World Fighting Championship Akhmat ===
Khasbulaev was expected to face American Kurt Holobaugh on March 16, 2016, at WFCA 16. He won the fight via unanimous decision.

In second fight at the WFCA on May 22, 2016, he beat Khunkar-Pasha Osmaev by unanimous decision.

Khasbulaev faced Salman Zhamaldaev at WCFA 23 Featherweight Grand Prix on October 4, 2016. He lost the fight via unanimous decision.

Khasbulaev faced Fernando Vieira at WCFA 33 on February 4, 2017. He won the fight via technical knockout in the third round.

Khasbulaev faced Genair da Silva at WCFA 38 on May 21, 2017. He won the fight via knockout in the second round.

=== Absolute Championship Akhmat ===
Khasbulaev faced Felipe Froes on March 26, 2021, at ACA 120: Oliveira vs. Bibulatov for the vacant ACA Featherweight Championship. After dominating the bout, he finally submitted Froes via rear-naked choke in the fourth round, winning the title in the process.

Khasbulaev's first defense of the ACA Featherweight title was scheduled against Ramazan Kishev on August 28, 2021, at ACA 127: Khasbulaev vs. Kishev. However, on August 4, Khasbulaev was removed from the card because of an injury, the title bout was moved to ACA 131: Abdulvakhabov vs. Dias. He won the bout via ground and pound at the end of the third round.

After Khasbulaev pulled out due to injury three times in 2022 in bouts against Alikhan Suleymanov, Khasbulaev was stripped of his title.

== Championships and accomplishments ==
=== Mixed martial arts ===
- Absolute Championship Akhmat
  - ACA Featherweight Championship (One time)
    - One successful title defence
- Bellator MMA
  - Bellator Season Eight Featherweight Tournament Championship
- League S-70
  - S-70 2012 Russian Welterweight Tournament Winner
- M-1 Global
  - M-1 Selection 2010 Eastern European Welterweight Tournament Runner-Up

=== Sambo ===
- World Combat Sambo Federation
  - 2010 WCSF World Combat Sambo Championships
- Fédération Internationale Amateur de Sambo
  - 2015 European Combat Sambo Championships
- Russian Combat Sambo Federation
  - Russian Combat Sambo National Championships (2009)

== Mixed martial arts record ==
Professional record breakdown
42 matches	34 wins	8 losses
By knockout	10	0
By submission	16	4
By decision	8	4

Res.	Record	Opponent	Method	Event	Date	Round	Time	Location	Notes
Win	34–8	Ramazan Kishev	TKO (punches)	ACA 131	November 5, 2021	3	4:59	Moscow, Russia	Defended the ACA Featherweight Championship.
Win	33–8	Felipe Froes	Submission (rear-naked choke)	ACA 120	March 26, 2021	4	1:02	Saint Petersburg, Russia	Won the vacant ACA Featherweight Championship. Froes missed weight (147 lb) and was stripped of the title. Only Khasbulaev was eligible to win the title.
Win	32–8	Levan Makashvili	Decision (unanimous)	ACA 104	February 21, 2020	3	5:00	Krasnodar, Russia	
Win	31–8	Alexandre Bezerra	TKO (punches)	ACA 100	October 4, 2019	3	1:27	Grozny, Russia	
Win	30–8	Mukhamed Kokov	Decision (unanimous)	ACA 94	March 30, 2019	3	5:00	Krasnodar, Russia	
Win	29–8	Rob Emerson	Submission (rear-naked choke)	WCFA 54	November 16, 2018	2	1:57	Isa Town, Bahrain	
Loss	28–8	Salman Zhamaldaev	Decision (unanimous)	WCFA 48	May 4, 2018	5	5:00	Baku, Azerbaijan	For the WFCA Featherweight Championship.
Win	28–7	Fernando Duarte	Submission (rear-naked choke)	WCFA 44	December 17, 2017	3	2:55	Grozny, Russia	
Win	27–7	Dzihihad Yunusov	Decision (unanimous)	WCFA 41	August 24, 2017	3	5:00	Grozny, Russia	
Win	26–7	Genair da Silva	KO (punch)	WFCA 38	May 21, 2017	2	4:00	Grozny, Russia	
Win	25–7	Fernando Vieira	TKO (retirement)	Akhmat Fight Show 33	February 4, 2017	3	1:57	Grozny, Russia	
Loss	24–7	Salman Zhamaldaev	Decision (unanimous)	Akhmat Fight Show 30	October 4, 2016	5	5:00	Grozny, Russia	2016 WFCA Featherweight Grand Prix Final. For the vacant WFCA Featherweight Championship.
Win	24–6	Khunkar-Pasha Osmaev	Decision (unanimous)	Akhmat Fight Show 22	May 22, 2016	3	5:00	Grozny, Russia	2016 WFCA Featherweight Grand Prix Semifinal.
Win	23–6	Kurt Holobaugh	Decision (unanimous)	WFCA 16	March 16, 2016	3	5:00	Grozny, Russia	Return to Featherweight. 2016 WFCA Featherweight Grand Prix Quarterfinal.
Loss	22–6	Eduard Vartanyan	Decision (unanimous)	ACB 27	December 21, 2015	3	5:00	Dushanbe, Tajikistan	
Win	22–5	Antônio Magno Pereira	Submission (rear-naked choke)	ACB 22	September 12, 2015	1	1:40	Saint Petersburg, Russia	Return to Lightweight.
Win	21–5	Mike Richman	Decision (unanimous)	Bellator 95	April 4, 2013	3	5:00	Atlantic City, New Jersey, United States	Won the Bellator Season Eight Featherweight Tournament.
Win	20–5	Marlon Sandro	TKO (punches)	Bellator 92	March 7, 2013	3	2:38	Temecula, California, United States	Bellator Season Eight Featherweight Tournament Semifinal.
Win	19–5	Fabricio Guerreiro	Submission (arm triangle choke)	Bellator 88	February 7, 2013	2	1:15	Duluth, Georgia, United States	Bellator Season Eight Featherweight Tournament Quarterfinal.
Win	18–5	Josh Pulsifer	Submission (rear-naked choke)	Bellator 79	November 2, 2012	1	3:30	Rama, Ontario, Canada	Bellator Season Seven Featherweight Tournament Reserve bout.
Win	17–5	Nayeb Hezam	KO (punches)	Bellator 76	October 12, 2012	1	0:24	Windsor, Ontario, Canada	Featherweight debut. Bellator Season Seven Featherweight Tournament Reserve bout.
Win	16–5	Alexei Nazarov	Decision (unanimous)	League S-70: Plotforma Cup 2012	August 11, 2012	3	5:00	Sochi, Russia	Won the 2012 S-70 Russian Welterweight Tournament.
Win	15–5	Ali Bagov	KO (punch)	League S-70: Russian Grand Prix 2011 (Stage 4)	May 25, 2012	2	1:57	Moscow, Russia	2012 S-70 Russian Welterweight Tournament Semifinal.
Win	14–5	Sergei Andreev	TKO (Punches)	League S-70: Russian Grand Prix 2011 (Stage 1)	December 22, 2011	1	2:20	Volgograd, Russia	2012 S-70 Russian Welterweight Tournament Quarterfinal.
Win	13–5	Magomed Dzhavadkhanov	Submission (heel hook)	ProFC 36	October 22, 2011	1	1:14	Khasavyurt, Russia	
Loss	12–5	Daniel Weichel	Technical Submission (triangle choke)	M-1 Challenge 23	March 5, 2011	1	3:26	Moscow, Russia	
Win	12–4	Krzysztof Wolski	Submission (heel hook)	Fight on the East: Poland vs. Ukraine	January 23, 2011	1	2:02	Rzeszów, Poland	
Win	11–4	Jakub Tangiev	TKO (punches)	ProFC 20: Union Nation Cup 10	November 21, 2010	1	4:20	Yerevan, Armenia	
Win	10–4	Jaroslav Franchuk	TKO (punches)	M-1 Selection Ukraine 2010: Round 6	November 6, 2010	1	4:47	Kyiv, Ukraine	Return to Welterweight.
Loss	9–4	Ivan Buchinger	Submission (rear-naked choke)	Heroes Gate 2	October 21, 2010	2	4:09	Prague, Czech Republic	
Win	9–3	Sergey Grechka	Submission (rear-naked choke)	M-1 Global: M-1 Ukraine Battle of Lions	October 1, 2010	1	3:30	Lviv, Ukraine	
Win	8–3	Kirill Krikunov	Submission (armbar)	M-1 Selection Ukraine 2010: Clash of the Titans	September 18, 2010	1	4:59	Kyiv, Ukraine	
Win	7–3	Kirill Krikunov	Submission (triangle choke)	M-1 Global: Battle on the Neva 4	August 19, 2010	1	2:13	Saint Petersburg, Russia	Return to Lightweight.
Loss	6–3	Shamil Zavurov	Submission (rear-naked choke)	M-1 Selection 2010: Eastern Europe Finals	July 22, 2010	1	3:16	Moscow, Russia	2010 M-1 Selection Eastern European Welterweight Tournament Final.
Win	6–2	Radik Iboyan	Submission (armbar)	M-1 Selection 2010: Eastern Europe Round 3	May 28, 2010	1	1:50	Kyiv, Ukraine	2010 M-1 Selection Eastern European Welterweight Tournament Semifinal.
Win	5–2	Rashid Magomedov	Decision (split)	M-1 Selection 2010: Eastern Europe Round 2	April 10, 2010	3	5:00	Kyiv, Ukraine	2010 M-1 Selection Eastern European Welterweight Tournament Quarterfinal.
Win	4–2	Vladimir Papusha	Submission (heel hook)	ProFC 13: Union Nation Cup 5	February 13, 2010	2	2:03	Nalchik, Russia	
Loss	3–2	David Khachatryan	Submission (rear-naked choke)	ProFC 10: Union Nation Cup 3	October 30, 2009	2	2:30	Rostov-on-Don, Russia	
Win	3–1	Gadzhi Dzhangishiev	Submission	M-1 Challenge: 2009 Selections 7	October 3, 2009	1	N/A	Moscow, Russia	
Loss	2–1	Rashid Magomedov	Decision (unanimous)	M-1 Challenge: 2009 Selections 5	July 22, 2009	3	5:00	Saint Petersburg, Russia	Welterweight debut.
Win	2–0	Ramzan Algeriev	Submission (toe hold)	Southern Federal Pankration Cup 2	June 11, 2009	1	3:15	Cherkessk, Russia	
Win	1–0	Yusup Magomedov	Submission (armbar)	Southern Federal Pankration Cup 1	April 10, 2009	1	3:15	Cherkessk, Russia	Lightweight debut.
