= Eduard Vartanyan =

Russian mixed martial arts fighter

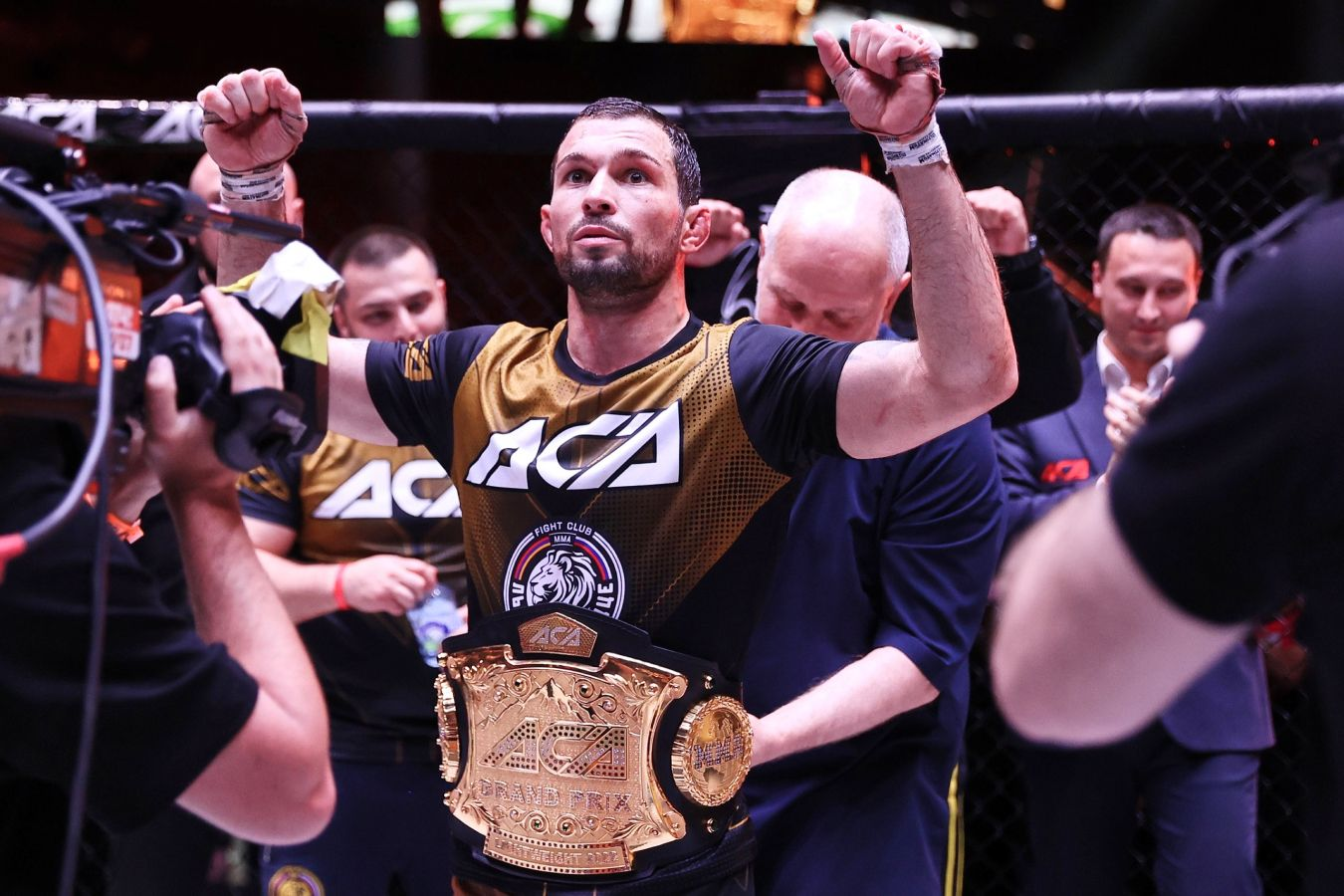
- Born: Эдуард Вартанян; June 11, 1991 (age 35); Yerevan, Armenian SSR, USSR
- Nationality: Russian
- Height: 5 ft 10 in (1.78 m)
- Weight: 155 lb (70 kg; 11 st 1 lb)
- Division: Lightweight
- Reach: 71 in (180 cm)
- Fighting out of: Moscow, Russia
- Team: Fight Club No. 1
- Years active: 2011–present

Mixed martial arts record
- Total: 32
- Wins: 28
- By knockout: 9
- By submission: 7
- By decision: 12
- Losses: 4
- By knockout: 1
- By submission: 2
- By decision: 1

Other information
- Mixed martial arts record from Sherdog

Eduard Vartanyan (born June 11, 1991) is a Russian mixed martial artist who competed in the Lightweight division of the Absolute Championship Akhmat (ACA). In July 2023, after he won the grand prix of Lightweight division of ACA, he reached #14 in World Lightweight rankings according to Fight Matrix and #10 in pound-for-pound ranking of Russia.

== Background ==
Eduard Vartanyan was born on June 11, 1991 in Yerevan to an Armenian father and a Russian mother. At an early age, Eduard moved to Moscow with his family. After graduating from college with honors, Eduard served in the Russian air defense forces. He holds a degree in information security engineering.

Eduard is the host of the popular podcast about mixed martial arts called "Fight Show".

He is cousin of Aram Vardanyan.

== Mixed martial arts career ==
=== Early career ===
Eduard began playing the sport in his second year of college at age 17, enrolling in a combat sambo class. Soon, in 2008, he won the Moscow championship. Also, Eduard was engaged in Thai boxing, winning the Moscow and the Russian championships in 2009.

Eduard had his first professional fight in mixed martial arts at the Vale Tudo 2 tournament, being submitted by Alim Kokov in the first round. He would take a year break, before returning at the VMAU - Headhunting tournament defeating Tarverdi Tarverdiev in the 1st round. In the second bout of the evening, he would face Alexander Mikhailov, defeating the opponent with an armbar. Eduard had his fourth fight with Sergey Khandozhko at the Legend 1 fight show, defeating him by technical knockout. Then he wins by TKO of the Brazilian Andre de Jesus in Rio de Janeiro in the first round at IMMAF 2013. At the Legend 2 tournament, he defeated the Frenchman Florent Betorangal. Eduard entered the Coliseum FC Welterweight tournament, facing Benjamin Brinza in the Quarter-finals, defeating him via unanimous decision. After defeating Vikto Tchernetsky via armbar, he would return to Coliseum Welterweight tournament to defeat Sergey Faley by majority decision.

In 2014, he won the World Cup in combat sambo in the category up to 74 kg, defeating Ali Bagov by technical knockout in the final, thereby becoming an international master of sports in combat sambo and the world champion. Eduard's next fight is with Artyom Spichak, winning him by knockout in the first round at the Sparta Legacy tournament, followed by a armbar submission in the first round of Anatoly Angelovsky.

=== Absolute Championship Akhmat ===
On March 21, 2015, he made his debut in ACB (now ACA) and instantly becomes a member of the lightweight Grand Prix, defeating Dzhamal Magomedov by unanimous decision at the ACB 15. In the summer of the same year, he meet with Amirkhan Adaev at ACB 20 and defeats him by technical knockout. On October 12, he meets Ali Bagov again at ACB 22 and this time he suffers his second defeat in his professional career, getting submitted in the first round via rear-naked choke. Eduard fought his next fight on December 22, 2015 as part of ACB 27 against Magomedrasul Khasbulaev, defeating him by unanimous decision.

With the win, Vartanyan got a chance for the ACB Lightweight Championship, facing off against the champion Abdul-Aziz Abdulvakhabov at ACB 32 on March 26, 2016. He was finished via TKO stoppage in the first torund. Functionally, Vartanyan was not one hundred percent ready for the fight, therefore, as he himself admitted in an interview.

Eduard quickly "played back" - in bouts against Brazilian Marcio Breno Rodriguez Braga at ACB 41 which he won via third round TKO and a close bout against Alexander Shabliy at ACB 49, which he managed to win via split decision. On April 15, 2017, at ACB 57, he defeated Alexander Sarnavskiy in the second round, choking him unconscious via rear-naked choke.

In a duel with Andrey Koshkin, which took place on September 30, 2017 at the ACB 71 tournament in Moscow, he won by unanimous decision, becoming the first interim ACB Lightweight Championship in the history of the promotion and a contender for the championship belt.

A second chance against Abdul-Aziz Abdulvakhabov fell to Vartanyan at ACB 77. In a controversial decision, Abdulvakhabov won the rematch via split decision, retaining the title. Disputes about the final result continued for a long time.

The next year was successful in Eduard's career - in November at the ACB 90 Moscow tournament he defeated Ustarmagomed Gajidaudov. On April 27, 2019 as part of ACA 95, defeated American Joshua Avelez by unanimous decision

Eduard Vartanyan fought his last contractual fight in the ACA promotion on September 5, 2020, defeating Mukhamed Kokov by unanimous decision at the ACA 110 tournament in the co-main fight of the evening in Moscow. However, the result of the fight caused a scandal, and the founder of the ACA league, Mairbek Khasiev, announced his intention to declare the fight invalid, disagreeing with the decision of the judges. On September 8, a specially convened ACA Athletic Commission recognized the fight as valid and upheld the decision of the judges.

=== Open Fighting Championship ===
After his career with the ACA, Vartanyan planned to continue his career in Western promotions, but due to coronavirus restrictions and visa problems, he had to continue his career in Russia, in the young Open FC promotion. His debut fight took place on May 28, 2021 in Moscow in the main fight of the Open Fighting Championship 4 tournament against the Brazilian fighter Michel Silva. The fight lasted all 3 rounds, in each round Vartanyan methodically dominated his opponent and the unanimous victory was given to Vartanyan.

He would then face Raimundo Batista on September 21, 2021 at Open Fighting Championship 10, dominating his opponent and winning after his opponent's corner stopped the fight after the first round.

=== 2023 ACA Lightweight Grand Prix ===
Vartanyan returned to ACA, entering the 2022 ACA Lightweight Grand Prix with his first opponent supposed to be Luis Peña on May 21, 2022 at ACA 139. However, Peña could not make it into Russia and was replaced by Alain Ilunga. He submitted his opponent in the third round via guillotine choke, advancing to the next round.

In the semi-finals on November 4, 2022 at ACA 147, Vartanyan faced Yusuf Raisov defeating him in dominant fashion, with the doctor stopping the bout after the second round due to the damage inflicted on Raisov.

The Grand Prix concluded on June 16, 2023 at ACA 159 against Artem Reznikov. Vartanyan was able to nullify the wrestling of Reznikov, punishing him on the feet concluding in a TKO stoppage in the third round and winning the Grand Prix and the cash prize.

In the fall of 2023, he turned down the biggest contract in the history of Russian mixed martial arts for the dream of fighting in the UFC.

On August 23, 2024, after a year layoff trying to sign with the UFC, Vartanyan faced Aleksandr Grozin at Nashe Delo: Vartanyan vs. Grozin, winning the bout via unanimous decision.

== Championships and accomplishments ==
=== Mixed martial arts ===
- Absolute Championship Akhmat
  - 2022 ACA Lightweight Grand Prix
  - Interim ACB Lightweight Championship (One time)

== Mixed martial arts record ==
Professional record breakdown
32 matches	28 wins	4 losses
By knockout	9	1
By submission	7	2
By decision	12	1

Res.	Record	Opponent	Method	Event	Date	Round	Time	Location	Notes
Win	28–4	Uzair Abdurakov	Submission (rear-naked choke)	ACA 202	April 12, 2026	3	2:04	Saint Petersburg, Russia	Fight of the Night.
Win	27–4	Akhmed Aliev	TKO (knee to the body and punches)	BetCity Fight Nights 127	August 16, 2025	2	1:08	Minsk, Belarus	
Win	26–4	Aleksandr Grozin	Decision (unanimous)	Nashe Delo 85	August 23, 2024	3	5:00	Chelyabinsk, Russia	Return to Welterweight.
Win	25–4	Artem Reznikov	TKO (punches)	ACA 159	June 16, 2023	3	4:32	Sochi, Russia	Won the 2022 ACA Lightweight Grand Prix.
Win	24–4	Yusuf Raisov	TKO (doctor stoppage)	ACA 147	November 4, 2022	2	5:00	Moscow, Russia	2022 ACA Lightweight Grand Prix Semifinal.
Win	23–4	Alain Ilunga	Submission (guillotine choke)	ACA 139	May 21, 2022	3	3:02	Moscow, Russia	2022 ACA Lightweight Grand Prix Quarterfinal.
Win	22–4	Raimundo Batista	TKO (corner stoppage)	Open FC 10	September 12, 2021	1	5:00	Moscow, Russia	Welterweight bout.
Win	21–4	Michel Silva	Decision (unanimous)	Open FC 4	May 22, 2021	3	5:00	Moscow, Russia	
Win	20–4	Mukhamed Kokov	Decision (split)	ACA 110	September 5, 2020	3	5:00	Moscow, Russia	
Win	19–4	Joshua Aveles	Decision (unanimous)	ACA 95	April 27, 2019	3	5:00	Moscow, Russia	
Win	18–4	Ustarmagomed Gadzhidaudov	Decision (unanimous)	ACB 90	November 10, 2018	3	5:00	Moscow, Russia	
Loss	17–4	Abdul-Aziz Abdulvakhabov	Decision (split)	ACB 77	December 23, 2017	5	5:00	Moscow, Russia	For the ACB Lightweight Championship
Win	17–3	Andrey Koshkin	Decision (unanimous)	ACB 71	September 30, 2017	5	5:00	Moscow, Russia	Won the interim ACB Lightweight Championship. Fight of the Night.
Win	16–3	Alexander Sarnavskiy	Technical Submission (rear-naked choke)	ACB 57	April 15, 2017	2	4:46	Moscow, Russia	
Win	15–3	Alexandr Shabliy	Decision (split)	ACB 49	November 26, 2016	3	5:00	Rostov-on-Don, Russia	Fight of the Night.
Win	14–3	Márcio Breno	TKO (knee and punches)	ACB 41	July 15, 2016	3	0:22	Sochi, Russia	
Loss	13–3	Abdul-Aziz Abdulvakhabov	TKO (punches)	ACB 32	March 26, 2016	1	2:53	Moscow, Russia	For the ACB Lightweight Championship.
Win	13–2	Magomedrasul Khasbulaev	Decision (unanimous)	ACB 27	December 21, 2015	3	5:00	Dushanbe, Tajikistan	
Loss	12–2	Ali Bagov	Submission (rear-naked choke)	ACB 22	September 12, 2015	1	1:16	Saint Petersburg, Russia	2015 ACB Lightweight Grand Prix Final.
Win	12–1	Amirkhan Adaev	TKO (punches)	ACB 20	June 14, 2015	1	3:47	Sochi, Russia	2015 ACB Lightweight Grand Prix Semifinal.
Win	11–1	Dzhamal Magomedov	Decision (unanimous)	ACB 15	March 21, 2015	3	5:00	Nalchik, Russia	Return to Lightweight. 2015 ACB Lightweight Grand Prix Quarterfinal.
Win	10–1	Anatoly Angelovskiy	Submission (armbar)	Tech-KREP FC: Battle Of Heroes	December 12, 2014	1	1:59	Saint Petersburg, Russia	
Win	9–1	Artem Spichakov	TKO (punches)	Legacy Of Sparta 1	September 14, 2014	1	2:02	Zelenograd, Russia	
Win	8–1	Sergey Faley	Decision (majority)	Coliseum FC: New History 3	May 29, 2014	3	5:00	Saint Petersburg, Russia	Coliseum FC Welterweight Grand Prix Semifinal.
Win	7–1	Viktor Tchernetsky	Submission (armbar)	Fight Alliance: Gladiator Fighting 1	April 5, 2014	2	1:50	Troitsk, Russia	Lightweight bout.
Win	6–1	Benjamin Brinsa	Decision (unanimous)	Coliseum FC: New History 2	January 25, 2014	3	5:00	Saint Petersburg, Russia	Coliseum FC Welterweight Grand Prix Quarterfinal.
Win	5–1	Florent Betorangal	Decision (unanimous)	Legend 2: Invasion	November 8, 2013	3	5:00	Moscow, Russia	
Win	4–1	André de Jesus	TKO (punches)	Imbituba Fight 2	July 13, 2013	1	4:15	Imbituba, Brazil	
Win	3–1	Sergey Khandozhko	TKO (punches)	Legend: Emelianenko vs. Sapp	May 25, 2013	2	4:00	Moscow, Russia	
Win	2–1	Alexander Mikhailov	Submission (armbar)	Vologda Martial Arts Festival 2012	October 12, 2012	2	0:56	Vologda, Russia	Won the Vologda Festival Welterweight Tournament.
Win	1–1	Tarverdi Tarverdiev	Submission (triangle choke)	Vologda Martial Arts Festival 2012	October 12, 2012	1	N/A	Vologda, Russia	Welterweight debut. Vologda Festival Welterweight Tournament Semifinal.
Loss	0–1	Alim Kokov	Submission (rear-naked choke)	Vale Tudo Russia 2	December 10, 2011	1	0:50	Zelenograd, Russia	Middleweight debut.

== Kickboxing record ==
Professional Kickboxing record
Date	Result	Opponent	Event	Location	Method	Round	Time
2024-03-06	Win	(Kazakhstan) Damir Ismagulov	Nashe Delo 82	Saint Petersburg, Russia	Decision (Unanimous)	3	3:00
Legend: Win Loss Draw/No contest Notes

== See also ==
- List of current ACA fighters
- List of male mixed martial artists
