= 2015 in Absolute Championship Berkut =

Mixed martial arts events

Information
- First date: January 31, 2015
- Last date: December 27, 2015

Events
- Total events: 20
- Kickboxing: 4

The year 2015 was the third year in the history of the Absolute Championship Berkut, a mixed martial arts promotion based in Russia. 2015 started with Absolute Championship Berkut 13. It started broadcasting through a television agreement with Match TV.

== ACB Grand Prix 2015 bracket ==
=== ACB Flyweight Grand Prix 2015 bracket ===
1st Round
(Russia) Oskar Dolchin
(Russia) Rasul Albaskhanov^{1}
(Brazil) Irmeson Oliveira | 3r.
(Ukraine) Ruslan Abiltarov | DEC
(Finland) Mikael Silander
(Russia) Yunus Evloev^{2}
(Russia) Velimurad Alkhasov | SUB
(Russia) Alexey Pastorov | 2r.

Semifinals
(Russia) Oscar Dolchin | 3r.
(Ukraine) Ruslan Abiltarov | DEC
(Finland) Mikael Silander | 3r.
(Russia) Velimurad Alkhasov | DEC

Final
(Ukraine) Ruslan Abiltarov | 2r.
(Russia) Velimurad Alkhasov | KO

^{1}Rasul Albaskhanov retired from the tournament, Albaskhanov missed weight, and the bout was canceled. Oskar Dolchin automatically advanced to the second round.

^{2}Yunus Evloev withdrew from the tournament dud to illness, Mikael Silander automatically advanced to the second round.

=== ACB Bantamweight Grand Prix 2015 bracket ===
1st Round
(Czech Republic) Filip Macek | SUB
(Russia) Murad Zeinulabidov | 3r.
(Ukraine) Alexey Naumov | 1r.
(Russia) Murad Kalamov | SUB
(Russia) Kharon Orzumiev | SUB
(Russia) Ilfat Amirov | 1r.
(Russia) Petr Yan | DEC
(Brazil) Renato Velame | 3r.

Semifinals
(Czech Republic) Filip Macek | 2r.
(Russia) Murad Kalamov | SUB
(Russia) Kharon Orzumiev | 1r.
(Russia) Petr Yan | SUB

Final
(Russia) Murad Kalamov | 3r.
(Russia) Petr Yan | DEC

=== ACB Featherweight Grand Prix 2015 bracket ===
1st Round
(Russia) Alexander Matmuratov
(Russia) Zaur Kasumov^{1}
(Spain) Roman Stakhuv | 1r.
(Russia) Abdul-Rakhman Temirov | SUB
(Russia) Mukhamed Kokov | SUB
(Argentina) Marcelo Rojo | 1r.
(Russia) Zabit Magomedsharipov | TKO
(Ukraine) Artak Nazaryan | 2r.

Semifinals
(Russia) Alexander Matmuratov | 1r.
(Russia) Abdul-Rakhman Temirov | SUB
(Russia) Mukhamed Kokov | 2r.
(Russia) Zabit Magomedsharipov | TKO

Final
(Russia) Abdul-Rakhman Temirov | 1r.
(Russia) Zabit Magomedsharipov | SUB

^{1}Zaur Kasumov withdrew from the tournament due to Food Poisoning, Alexander Matmuratov automatically advance to the second round.

=== ACB Lightweight Grand Prix 2015 bracket ===
1st Round
(Russia) Amirkhan Adaev | TKO
(Croatia) Marko Burušić | 2r.
(Russia) Dzhamal Magomedov | 3r.
(Russia) Eduard Vartanyan | DEC
(Russia) Shamkhan Danaev | 'TKO
(Russia) Oleg Misikov | 3r.
(Russia) Ali Bagov | SUB
(Brazil) Thiago Meller^{1} | 1r.

Semifinals
(Russia) Amirkhan Adaev | 1r.
(Russia) Eduard Vartanyan | TKO
(Poland) Jakub Kowalewicz^{2} | 1r.
(Russia) Ali Bagov | SUB

Final
(Russia) Eduard Vartanyan | 1r.
(Russia) Ali Bagov | SUB

^{1}Mickaël Lebout retired from the Grand Prix when he sign with the UFC, was replaced by Muhammed Lawal.

^{2}Shamkhan Danaev was injured and couldn't participate in the second round of the Grand Prix, and was subsequently replaced by Thiago Meller.

=== ACB Welterweight Grand Prix 2015 bracket ===
1st Round
(Russia) Andrey Koshkin | DEC
(Brazil) Vitor Nóbrega | 3r.
(Russia) Imran Abaev | 1r.
(Russia) Ustarmagomed Gadzhidaudov | SUB
(Russia) Sergey Khandozhko | TKO
(Belarus) Sergey Faley | 1r.
(Russia) Albert Duraev | SUB
(Czech Republic) Patrik Kincl | 3r.

Semifinals
(Russia) Sergei Martynov^{1} | 3r.
(Russia) Ustarmagomed Gadzhidaudov | DEC
(Russia) Sergey Khandozhko | 3r.
(Russia) Albert Duraev | DEC

Final
(Russia) Ustarmagomed Gadzhidaudov | 5r.
(Russia) Albert Duraev | SUB

^{1}Andrey Koshkin withdrew from the tournament, was replaced by Sergei Martynov.

=== ACB Middleweight Grand Prix 2015 bracket ===
1st Round
(Ukraine) Vladimir Katyhin | NC
(Russia) Islam Edilgeriev | 3r.
(Croatia) Josip Artuković | 1r.
(Russia) Arbi Aguev | NC
(Poland) Adam Zając | DEC
(Russia) Dmitry Lazurin | 3r.
(Russia) Anatoly Tokov | SUB
(Ukraine) Maxim Shvets | 2r.

Semifinals
(Ukraine) Vladimir Katyhin | 3r.
(Russia) Arbi Aguev | DEC
(Poland) Adam Zając | 1r.
(Russia) Anatoly Tokov | TKO

Final
(Russia) Arbi Aguev | 4r.
(Russia) Anatoly Tokov | KO

=== ACB Light Heavyweight Grand Prix 2015 bracket ===
1st Round
(Georgia (country)) Giga Kukhalashvili | TKO
(Russia) Evgeniy Fedotov | 1r.
(Tajikistan) Amirdzhon Zaripov | 1r.
(Russia) Husein Kushagov | TKO
(Russia) Isa Umarov | DEC
(Ukraine) Vasily Babich | 3r.
(Russia) Muslim Makhmudov | TKO
(Russia) Enver Salahdinov | 1r.

Semifinals
(Georgia (country)) Giga Kukhalashvili | 1r.
(Russia) Husein Kushagov | TKO
(Russia) Isa Umarov | 3r.
(Russia) Muslim Makhmudov | DEC

Final
(Russia) Husein Kushagov | 1r.
(Russia) Muslim Makhmudov | SUB

=== ACB Heavyweight Grand Prix 2015 bracket ===
1st Round
(Russia) Zaurbek Bashaev | DEC
(Azerbaijan) Zaur Gadzhibabayev | 3r.
(United States) Lew Polley | 1r.
(Poland) Michał Andryszak | TKO
(Russia) Mukhomad Vakhaev | SUB
(Latvia) Igor Kostin | 2r.
(Russia) Salimgerey Rasulov | TKO
(Brazil) Alex Coruja | 1r.

Semifinals
(Russia) Zaurbek Bashaev | 1r.
(Poland) Michał Andryszak | TKO
(Russia) Mukhomad Vakhaev | 3r.
(Russia) Salimgerey Rasulov | DEC

Final
(Poland) Michał Andryszak | 1r.
(Russia) Salimgerey Rasulov | KO

== List of events ==
=== Mixed martial arts ===
| # | Event title | Date | Arena | Location |
|---|---|---|---|---|
| 1 | ACB 13: Poland vs. Russia | January 31, 2015 | Orlen Arena | Płock, Poland |
| 2 | ACB 14: Grand Prix Berkut 2015 Stage 1 | February 28, 2015 | Arena Coliseum | Grozny, Russia |
| 3 | ACB 15: Grand Prix Berkut 2015 Stage 2 | March 21, 2015 | Nalchik Sports Complex | Nalchik, Russia |
| 4 | ACB 16: Grand Prix Berkut 2015 Stage 3 | April 17, 2015 | Friendship Arena | Moscow, Russia |
| 5 | ACB 17: Grand Prix Berkut 2015 Stage 4 | May 2, 2015 | Arena Coliseum | Grozny, Russia |
| 6 | ACB 18: Grand Prix Berkut 2015 Stage 5 | May 23, 2015 | Arena Coliseum | Grozny, Russia |
| 7 | ACB 19: Baltic Challenge | May 30, 2015 | Amber Arena | Kaliningrad, Russia |
| 8 | ACB 20: Sochi | June 14, 2015 | Bolshoy Ice Dome | Sochi, Russia |
| 9 | ACB 21: Young Eagles 1 | August 29, 2015 | Arena Coliseum | Grozny, Russia |
| 10 | ACB 22: Grand Prix Berkut 2015 Finals Stage 1 | September 12, 2015 | Ice Palace | Saint Petersburg, Russia |
| 11 | ACB 23: Young Eagles 2 | October 10, 2015 | Arena Coliseum | Grozny, Russia |
| 12 | ACB 24: Grand Prix Berkut 2015 Finals Stage 2 | October 24, 2015 | Dynamo Palace of Sports in Krylatskoye | Moscow, Russia |
| 13 | ACB 25: Young Eagles 3 | November 7, 2015 | Arena Coliseum | Grozny, Russia |
| 14 | ACB 26: Grand Prix Berkut 2015 Finals Stage 3 | November 28, 2015 | Arena Coliseum | Grozny, Russia |
| 15 | ACB 27: Tajikistan | December 20, 2015 | Sports Complex "20 Years of Independence" | Dushanbe, Tajikistan |
| 16 | ACB 28: Young Eagles 4 | December 27, 2015 | Sports Complex "Gladiator", Lenin Plaza | Nalchik, Russia |

=== Kickboxing ===
| # | Event title | Date | Arena | Location |
|---|---|---|---|---|
| 1 | ACB KB 1: Grand Prix Quarter-Finals | April 25, 2015 | Arena Coliseum | Grozny, Russia |
| 2 | ACB KB 2: Grand Prix Semi-Finals | September 27, 2015 | Vityaz Ice Palace | Anapa, Russia |
| 3 | ACB KB 3: Grand Prix Final | October 16, 2015 | Sala Transilvania | Sibiu, Romania |
| 4 | ACB KB 4: Grand Prix Final | November 13, 2015 | Sukharev Sport Complex | Perm, Russia |

== ACB 13: Poland vs. Russia ==
ACB 13: Poland vs. Russia
- Promotion: Absolute Championship Berkut
- Date: January 31, 2015
- Venue: Orlen Arena
- City: Płock, Poland

Absolute Championship Berkut 13: Poland vs. Russia was a mixed martial arts event held by Absolute Championship Berkut on January 31, 2015, at the Orlen Arena in Płock, Poland.

=== Results ===
Fight Card
| Weight Class | | | | Method | Round | Time | Notes |
|---|---|---|---|---|---|---|---|
| Welterweight 77 kg | (Russia) Beslan Isaev | def. | (Brazil) Jose Gomes | KO (Punch) | 1 | 1:15 | |
| Welterweight 77 kg | (Russia) Arbi Aguev | def. | (Poland) Mateusz Strzelczyk | Submission (Rear Naked Choke) | 1 | 3:10 | |
| Welterweight 77 kg | (Russia) Albert Duraev | def. | (Poland) Damian Biłas | Submission (North-South Choke) | 1 | 2:37 | |
| Lightweight 70 kg | (Poland) Janusz Staszewski | def. | (Russia) Magomed Khamzaev | KO (Punch) | 1 | 2:36 | |
| Lightweight 70 kg | (Russia) Amirkhan Adaev | def. | (Ukraine) Taras Sapa | TKO (Punches) | 1 | 2:44 | |
| Lightweight 70 kg | (Russia) Artem Lobov | def. | (Russia) Rasul Shovhalov | Submission (Armbar) | 2 | 1:32 | |
| Catchweight 64 kg | (Poland) Izabela Badurek | def. | (Russia) Zaira Dyshekova | Submission (Armbar) | 1 | 2:26 | |
| Featherweight 66 kg | (Poland) Damian Stasiak | def. | (Poland) Kamil Selwa | Submission (Triangle Choke) | 1 | 3:42 | |
| Flyweight 57 kg | (Russia) Rasul Albaskhanov | def. | (Ukraine) Ivan Andrushchenko | Submission (Guillotine Choke) | 2 | 3:07 | |
| Welterweight 77 kg | (Russia) Viskhan Amerkhanov | def. | (Poland) Krystian Zaka | Submission (Triangle Choke) | 1 | 4:02 | |
| Middleweight 84 kg | (Poland) Aleksander Rychlik | def. | (Poland) Islam Nojaev | TKO (Punches) | 1 | 2:38 | |

== ACB 14: Grand Prix Berkut 2015 Stage 1 ==
ACB 14: Grand Prix Berkut 2015 Stage 1
- Promotion: Absolute Championship Berkut
- Date: February 28, 2015
- Venue: Arena Coliseum
- City: Grozny, Russia

Absolute Championship Berkut 14: Grand Prix Berkut 2015 Stage 1 was a mixed martial arts event held by Absolute Championship Berkut on February 28, 2015, at the Arena Coliseum in Grozny, Russia.

=== Results ===
Fight Card
| Weight Class | | | | Method | Round | Time | Notes |
|---|---|---|---|---|---|---|---|
| Light Heavyweight 93 kg | (Russia) Isa Umarov | def. | (Ukraine) Vasily Babich | Decision (Unanimous) | 3 | 5:00 | |
| Heavyweight 120 kg | (Poland) Michał Andryszak | def. | (United States) Lew Polley | TKO (Punches) | 1 | 3:15 | |
| Bantamweight 61 kg | (Czech Republic) Filip Macek | def. | (Russia) Murad Zeinulabidov | Submission (Rear Naked Choke) | 3 | 0:55 | |
| Light Heavyweight 93 kg | (Russia) Husein Kushagov | def. | (Tajikistan) Amirdzhon Zaripov | TKO (Punches) | 1 | 0:43 | |
| Heavyweight 120 kg | (Russia) Salimgerey Rasulov | def. | (Brazil) Alex Coruja | TKO (Punches) | 1 | 0:43 | |
| Bantamweight 61 kg | (Russia) Murad Kalamov | def. | (Ukraine) Alexey Naumov | TKO (Retirement) | 2 | 1:32 | |
| Heavyweight 120 kg | (Poland) Mukhomad Vakhaev | def. | (Latvia) Igor Kostin | Submission (Rear Naked Choke) | 2 | 2:38 | |
| Light Heavyweight 93 kg | (Russia) Muslim Makhmudov | def. | (Russia) Enver Salahdinov | TKO (Punches) | 1 | 0:17 | |
| Bantamweight 61 kg | (Russia) Petr Yan | def. | (Brazil) Renato Velame | Decision (Unanimous) | 3 | 5:00 | |
| Light Heavyweight 93 kg | (Georgia (country)) Giga Kukhalashvili | def. | (Russia) Evgeniy Fedotov | KO (Head Kick and Punches) | 1 | 0:41 | |
| Heavyweight 120 kg | (Russia) Zaurbek Bashaev | def. | (Azerbaijan) Zaur Gadzhibabayev | Decision (Unanimous) | 3 | 5:00 | |
| Bantamweight 61 kg | (Russia) Kharon Orzumiev | def. | (Russia) Ilfat Amirov | Submission (Kimura) | 1 | 1:06 | |
| Heavyweight 120 kg | (Russia) Vladimir Daineko | def. | (Russia) Adam Usmaev | TKO (Punches) | 1 | N/A | |

== ACB 15: Grand Prix Berkut 2015 Stage 2 ==
ACB 15: Grand Prix Berkut 2015 Stage 2
- Promotion: Absolute Championship Berkut
- Date: March 21, 2015
- Venue: Nalchik Sports Complex
- City: Nalchik, Russia

Absolute Championship Berkut 15: Grand Prix Berkut 2015 Stage 2 was a mixed martial arts event held by Absolute Championship Berkut on March 21, 2015, at the Nalchik Sports Complex in Nalchik, Russia.

=== Results ===
Fight Card
| Weight Class | | | | Method | Round | Time | Notes |
|---|---|---|---|---|---|---|---|
| Lightweight 70 kg | (Russia) Ali Bagov | def. | (Brazil) Thiago Meller | Submission (Guillotine Choke) | 1 | 2:51 | |
| Middleweight 84 kg | (Russia) Anatoly Tokov | def. | (Ukraine) Maxim Shvets | Submission (Guillotine Choke) | 2 | 2:31 | |
| Featherweight 66 kg | (Russia) Mukhamed Kokov | def. | (Argentina) Marcelo Rojo | Submission (Rear Naked Choke) | 1 | 4:51 | |
| Middleweight 84 kg | (Poland) Adam Zając | def. | (Russia) Dmitry Lazurin | Decision (Unanimous) | 3 | 5:00 | |
| Featherweight 66 kg | (Russia) Abdul-Rakhman Temirov | def. | (Spain) Roman Stakhuv | Submission (Rear Naked Choke) | 1 | 4:50 | |
| Lightweight 70 kg | (Russia) Eduard Vartanyan | def. | (Russia) Dzhamal Magomedov | Decision (Unanimous) | 3 | 5:00 | |

== ACB 16: Grand Prix Berkut 2015 Stage 3 ==
ACB 16: Grand Prix Berkut 2015 Stage 3
- Promotion: Absolute Championship Berkut
- Date: April 17, 2015
- Venue: Friendship Arena
- City: Moscow, Russia

Absolute Championship Berkut 16: Grand Prix Berkut 2015 Stage 3 was a mixed martial arts event held by Absolute Championship Berkut on April 17, 2015, at the Friendship Arena in Moscow, Russia.

=== Results ===
Fight Card
| Weight Class | | | | Method | Round | Time | Notes |
|---|---|---|---|---|---|---|---|
| Welterweight 77 kg | (Russia) Sergey Khandozhko | def. | (Belarus) Sergey Faley | TKO (Shoulder Injury) | 1 | 5:00 | |
| Welterweight 77 kg | (Croatia) Josip Artuković | def. | (Russia) Arbi Aguev | No Contest | 1 | 0:12 | |
| Middleweight 84 kg | (Russia) Muslim Khizriev | def. | (Russia) Ibragim Tibilov | Submission (Armbar) | 1 | 4:55 | |
| Welterweight 77 kg | (Russia) Andrey Koshkin | def. | (Brazil) Dmitry Lazurin | Decision (Unanimous) | 3 | 5:00 | |
| Welterweight 77 kg | (Russia) Albert Duraev | def. | (Czech Republic) Patrik Kincl | Submission (Triangle Choke) | 3 | 4:50 | |
| Flyweight 57 kg | (Ukraine) Ruslan Abiltarov | def. | (Brazil) Irmeson Oliveira | Decision (Split) | 3 | 5:00 | |

== ACB KB 1: Grand Prix Quarter-Finals ==
ACB KB 1: Grand Prix Quarter-Finals
- Promotion: Absolute Championship Berkut
- Date: April 25, 2015
- Venue: Arena Coliseum
- City: Grozny, Russia

Event chronology
| ACB 30 | ACB KB 1: Grand Prix Quarter-Finals | ACB 31 |

Absolute Championship Berkut Kickboxing 1: Grand Prix Quarter-Finals was a Kickboxing event held by Absolute Championship Berkut on April 25, 2015, at the Arena Coliseum in Grozny, Russia.

== ACB 17: Grand Prix Berkut 2015 Stage 4 ==
ACB 17: Grand Prix Berkut 2015 Stage 4
- Promotion: Absolute Championship Berkut
- Date: May 2, 2015
- Venue: Arena Coliseum
- City: Grozny, Russia

Absolute Championship Berkut 17: Grand Prix Berkut 2015 Stage 4 was a mixed martial arts event held by Absolute Championship Berkut on May 2, 2015, at the Arena Coliseum in Grozny, Russia.

=== Results ===
Fight Card
| Weight Class | | | | Method | Round | Time | Notes |
|---|---|---|---|---|---|---|---|
| Lightweight 70 kg | (Russia) Abdul-Aziz Abdulvakhabov | def. | (Ukraine) Vadim Russul | Submission (Rear Naked Choke) | 1 | 4:59 | |
| Lightweight 70 kg | (Russia) Rasul Yakhyaev | def. | (Russia) Timur Temirbulatov | TKO (Punches) | 1 | 2:31 | |
| Welterweight 77 kg | (Russia) Imran Abaev | def. | (Russia) Timur Badriev | Decision (Unanimous) | 3 | 5:00 | |
| Lightweight 70 kg | (Russia) Alim Cherkesov | def. | (Russia) Usman Bisultanov | TKO (Punches) | 1 | 4:32 | |
| Lightweight 70 kg | (Russia) Iskhak Aliev | def. | (Russia) Alikhan Suleimanov | Submission (Anaconda Choke) | 1 | 0:40 | |
| Bantamweight 61 kg | (Russia) Khamzat Bukiev | def. | (Russia) Murat Teuchezh | KO (Punch) | 2 | 4:11 | |

== ACB 18: Grand Prix Berkut 2015 Stage 5 ==
18:ACB 18: Grand Prix Berkut 2015 Stage 5
- Promotion: Absolute Championship Berkut
- Date: May 23, 2015
- Venue: Arena Coliseum
- City: Grozny, Russia

Absolute Championship Berkut 18: Grand Prix Berkut 2015 Stage 5 was a mixed martial arts event held by Absolute Championship Berkut on May 23, 2015, at the Arena Coliseum in Grozny, Russia.

=== Results ===
Fight Card
| Weight Class | | | | Method | Round | Time | Notes |
|---|---|---|---|---|---|---|---|
| Lightweight 70 kg | (Russia) Zaur Kasumov | def. | (Russia) Igor Baier | Submission (Rear Naked Choke) | 1 | 3:40 | |
| Featherweight 66 kg | (Russia) Magomed Magomedov | def. | (Ukraine) Artur Kascheev | TKO (Kicks and Punches) | 1 | 2:31 | |
| Lightweight 70 kg | (Russia) Yusup Umarov | def. | (Russia) Islam Azubekov | Decision (Unanimous) | 3 | 5:00 | |
| Lightweight 70 kg | (Poland) Lambert Akhiadov | def. | (Russia) Orkhan Dadashov | Decision (Unanimous) | 3 | 5:00 | |
| Lightweight 70 kg | (Russia) Shamil Nikaev | def. | (Russia) Amir Aygubov | Decision (Unanimous) | 3 | 5:00 | |
| Welterweight 77 kg | (Russia) Haseyn Daudov | def. | (Russia) Rodion Bestaev | TKO (Punches) | 1 | 0:20 | |

== ACB 19: Baltic Challenge ==
ACB 19: Baltic Challenge
- Promotion: Absolute Championship Berkut
- Date: May 30, 2015
- Venue: Amber Arena
- City: Kaliningrad, Russia

Absolute Championship Berkut 19: Baltic Challenge was a mixed martial arts event held by Absolute Championship Berkut on May 30, 2015, at the Amber Arena in Kaliningrad, Russia.

=== Results ===
Fight Card
| Weight Class | | | | Method | Round | Time | Notes |
|---|---|---|---|---|---|---|---|
| Middleweight 84 kg | (Russia) Anatoly Tokov | def. | (Poland) Adam Zając | TKO (Punches) | 1 | 2:00 | |
| Middleweight 84 kg | (Russia) Arbi Aguev | def. | (Ukraine) Vladimir Katyhin | Decision (Unanimous) | 3 | 5:00 | |
| Welterweight 77 kg | (Russia) Alikhan Ustarkhanov | def. | (Ukraine) Artem Shokalo | Decision (Majority) | 3 | 5:00 | |
| Bantamweight 61 kg | (Russia) Petr Yan | def. | (Russia) Kharon Orzumiev | Submission (Guillotine Choke) | 1 | 0:47 | |
| Heavyweight 120 kg | (Poland) Michał Andryszak | def. | (Russia) Zaurbek Bashaev | TKO (Head Kick and Punches) | 1 | 0:26 | |
| Welterweight 77 kg | (Ukraine) Alexander Pletenko | def. | (Russia) Oleg Khromov | Decision (Unanimous) | 3 | 5:00 | |

== ACB 20: Sochi ==
ACB 20: Sochi
- Promotion: Absolute Championship Berkut
- Date: June 14, 2015
- Venue: Bolshoy Ice Dome
- City: Sochi, Russia

Absolute Championship Berkut 20: Sochi was a mixed martial arts event held by Absolute Championship Berkut on June 14, 2015, at the Bolshoy Ice Dome in Sochi, Russia.

=== Results ===
Fight Card
| Weight Class | | | | Method | Round | Time | Notes |
|---|---|---|---|---|---|---|---|
| Lightweight 70 kg | (Russia) Eduard Vartanyan | def. | (Russia) Amirkhan Adaev | TKO (punches) | 1 | 3:47 | |
| Light Heavyweight 93 kg | (Russia) Gadzhimurad Antigulov | def. | (Brazil) Cássio de Oliveira | TKO (punches) | 1 | 0:12 | |
| Welterweight 77 kg | (Russia) Albert Duraev | def. | (Russia) Sergey Khandozhko | Decision (unanimous) | 3 | 5:00 | |
| Featherweight 66 kg | (Russia) Zabit Magomedsharipov | def. | (Russia) Mukhamed Kokov | TKO (arm injury) | 1 | 0:47 | |
| Light Heavyweight 93 kg | (Russia) Muslim Makhmudov | def. | (Russia) Isa Umarov | Decision (unanimous) | 3 | 5:00 | |
| Featherweight 66 kg | (Russia) Abdul-Rakhman Temirov | def. | (Russia) Alexander Matmuratov | Submission (rear-naked choke) | 1 | 3:30 | |
| Flyweight 57 kg | (Russia) Velimurad Alkhasov | def. | (Finland) Mikael Silander | Decision (majority) | 3 | 5:00 | |

== ACB 21: Young Eagles 1 ==
ACB 21: Young Eagles 1
- Promotion: Absolute Championship Berkut
- Date: August 29, 2015
- Venue: Arena Coliseum
- City: Grozny, Russia

Absolute Championship Berkut 21: Young Eagles 1 was a mixed martial arts event held by Absolute Championship Berkut on August 29, 2015, at the Arena Coliseum in Grozny, Russia.

=== Results ===
Fight Card
| Weight Class | | | | Method | Round | Time | Notes |
|---|---|---|---|---|---|---|---|
| Welterweight 77 kg | (Russia) Nikolay Aleksakhin | def. | (Brazil) Jose Gomes | TKO (Punches) | 1 | 4:12 | |
| Welterweight 77 kg | (Ukraine) Renat Lyatifov | def. | (Russia) Eldarhan Machukaev | Decision (Unanimous) | 3 | 5:00 | |
| Lightweight 70 kg | (Russia) Said-Khamzat Avkhadov | def. | (Russia) Anatoliy Pokrovsky | TKO (Punches) | 2 | 1:48 | |
| Featherweight 66 kg | (Russia) Zaur Kasumov | def. | (Greece) Alexis Savvidis | Decision (Unanimous) | 3 | 5:00 | |
| Featherweight 66 kg | (Russia) Lambert Akhiadov | def. | (Georgia (country)) Paata Robakidze | Decision (Unanimous) | 3 | 5:00 | |
| Lightweight 70 kg | (Russia) Abdul-Rakhman Makhazhiev | def. | (Ukraine) Sergey Prokopyuk | Submission (Triangle Choke) | 1 | 3:08 | |

== ACB 22: Grand Prix 2015 Finals Stage 1 ==
ACB 22: Grand Prix 2015 Finals Stage 1
- Promotion: Absolute Championship Berkut
- Date: September 12, 2015
- Venue: Ice Palace
- City: Saint Petersburg, Russia

Absolute Championship Berkut 22: Grand Prix 2015 Finals Stage 1 was a mixed martial arts event held by Absolute Championship Berkut on September 12, 2015, at the Ice Palace in Saint Petersburg Russia.

=== Results ===
Fight Card
| Weight Class | | | | Method | Round | Time | Notes |
|---|---|---|---|---|---|---|---|
| Welterweight 77 kg | (Russia) Albert Duraev | def. | (Russia) Ustarmagomed Gadzhidaudov | Submission (Rear Naked Choke) | 5 | 3:40 | Grand Prix Berkut 2015 Welterweight Final |
| Lightweight 70 kg | (Russia) Abdul-Aziz Abdulvakhabov | def. | (Russia) Zulfikar Usmanov | TKO (Doctor Stoppage) | 1 | 4:47 | |
| Lightweight 70 kg | (Russia) Ali Bagov | def. | (Russia) Eduard Vartanyan | Submission (Rear Naked Choke) | 1 | 1:16 | Grand Prix Berkut 2015 Lightweight Final |
| Lightweight 70 kg | (Russia) Magomedrasul Khasbulaev | def. | (Brazil) Antônio Magno Pereira | Submission (Rear Naked Choke) | 1 | 1:40 | |
| Middleweight 84 kg | (Bulgaria) Nikola Dipchikov | def. | (Russia) Dmitry Samoilov | Decision (Unanimous) | 3 | 5:00 | |
| Flyweight 57 kg | (Ukraine) Ruslan Abiltarov | def. | (Russia) Nikita Kochetkov | Submission (Guillotine Choke) | 1 | 3:45 | |

== ACB KB 2: Grand Prix Semi-Finals ==
ACB KB 2: Grand Prix Semi-Finals
- Promotion: Absolute Championship Berkut
- Date: September 27, 2015
- Venue: Vityaz Ice Palace
- City: Anapa, Russia

Event chronology
| ACB 30 | ACB KB 2: Grand Prix Semi-Finals | ACB 31 |

Absolute Championship Berkut Kickboxing 2: Grand Prix Semi-Finals was a Kickboxing event held by Absolute Championship Berkut on September 27, 2015, at the Vityaz Ice Palace in Anapa, Russia.

== ACB 23: Young Eagles 2 ==
ACB 23: Young Eagles 2
- Promotion: Absolute Championship Berkut
- Date: October 10, 2015
- Venue: Arena Coliseum
- City: Grozny, Russia

Absolute Championship Berkut 23: Young Eagles 2 was a mixed martial arts event held by Absolute Championship Berkut on October 10, 2015, at the Arena Coliseum in Grozny, Russia.

=== Results ===
Fight Card
| Weight Class | | | | Method | Round | Time | Notes |
|---|---|---|---|---|---|---|---|
| Featherweight 66 kg | (Russia) Magomed Khamzaev | def. | (Azerbaijan) Vugar Mamedzade | Decision (Unanimous) | 3 | 5:00 | |
| Bantamweight 61 kg | (Russia) Magomed Ginazov | def. | (Ukraine) Aleksandr Lunga | Decision (Unanimous) | 3 | 5:00 | |
| Lightweight 70 kg | (Russia) Khamzat Aushev | def. | (Ukraine) Ivan Privalov | Submission (Heel Hook) | 1 | 0:35 | |
| Lightweight 70 kg | (Russia) Yusup Umarov | def. | (Russia) Konstantin Veselkin | KO (Kick to the Body) | 2 | 2:16 | |
| Lightweight 70 kg | (Russia) Marat Balaev | def. | (Ukraine) Abdul-Aziz Mezhidov | Decision (Unanimous) | 3 | 5:00 | |
| Lightweight 70 kg | (Russia) Alibek Akhazaev | def. | (Tajikistan) Dilovar Davlatov | Decision (Unanimous) | 3 | 5:00 | |

== ACB KB 3: Grand Prix Final ==
ACB KB 3: Grand Prix Final
- Promotion: Absolute Championship Berkut
- Date: October 16, 2015
- Venue: Sala Transilvania
- City: Sibiu, Romania

Event chronology
| ACB 30 | ACB KB 3: Grand Prix Final | ACB 31 |

Absolute Championship Berkut Kickboxing 3: Grand Prix Final was a Kickboxing event held by Absolute Championship Berkut on October 16, 2015, at the Sala Transilvania in Sibiu, Romania.

=== Results ===
Fight Card
| Weight Class | | | | Method | Round | Notes |
|---|---|---|---|---|---|---|
| KB Light Heavyweight 95 kg | (Brazil) Jhonata Diniz | def. | (Belarus) Valentin Slavikovski | KO | 1 | Grand Prix Final |
| KB Lightweight 73.5 kg | (Netherlands) Albert Kraus | def. | (Romania) Marius Tiţă | Decision (Unanimous) | 3 | |
| KB Heavyweight +95 kg | (Netherlands) Tarik Khbabez | def. | (Romania) Sebastian Ciobanu | Decision (Unanimous) | 3 | |
| KB Bantamweight 61 kg | (Russia) Umar Paskhaev | def. | (Romania) Marius Tolea | Decision (Unanimous) | 3 | |
| KB Lightweight 72.5 kg | (Azerbaijan) Parviz Abdullayev | def. | (Romania) Haris Ferizović | Decision (Unanimous) | 3 | |
| KB Welterweight 77 kg | (Germany) Sergej Braun | def. | (Romania) Dorin Stan | Decision (Unanimous) | 3 | |
| KB Welterweight 77 kg | (England) Jamie Bates | def. | (Belarus) Pavel Turuk | Decision (Unanimous) | 3 | |
| KB Lightweight 72.5 kg | (Kosovo) Hysni Beqiri | def. | (Netherlands) Warren Stevelmans | KO | 1 | |
| KB Bantamweight 61 kg | (Romania) Sorin Tănăsie | def. | (Hungary) Áron Szilágyi | Decision (Unanimous) | 3 | |
| KB Featherweight 66 kg | (Uzbekistan) Zahid Zairov | def. | (Chechnya) Lom-Ali Eskije | Decision (Unanimous) | 3 | |
| KB Lightweight 75 kg | (Romania) Dragoș Fluerașu | def. | (Russia) Mansur Vaduev | Decision (Unanimous) | 3 | |
| KB Bantamweight 61 kg | (Romania) Eugen Dragomir | vs. | (Russia) Bekhan Evsultanov | Draw | 3 | |
| KB Lightweight 71 kg | (Romania) Robert Stoica | def. | (Russia) Salamu Dzamalkhavov | TKO | 2 | |
| KB Light Heavyweight 95 kg | (Romania) Sebastian Cozmâncă | def. | (Romania) Cosmin Joltea | Decision (Unanimous) | 3 | |

== ACB 24: Grand Prix 2015 Finals Stage 2 ==
ACB 24: Grand Prix Berkut 2015 Finals Stage 2
- Promotion: Absolute Championship Berkut
- Date: October 24, 2015
- Venue: Dynamo Palace of Sports in Krylatskoye
- City: Moscow, Russia

Absolute Championship Berkut 24: Grand Prix Berkut 2015 Finals Stage 2 was a mixed martial arts event held by Absolute Championship Berkut on October 24, 2015, at the Dynamo Palace of Sports in Krylatskoye in Moscow, Russia.

=== Results ===
Fight Card
| Weight Class | | | | Method | Round | Time | Notes |
|---|---|---|---|---|---|---|---|
| Featherweight 66 kg | (Russia) Zabit Magomedsharipov | def. | (Russia) Abdul-Rakhman Temirov | Submission (Guillotine Choke) | 1 | 4:16 | Grand Prix Berkut 2015 Featherweight Final |
| Heavyweight 120 kg | (Russia) Salimgerey Rasulov | def. | (Poland) Michał Andryszak | TKO (Punches) | 1 | 0:25 | Grand Prix Berkut 2015 Heavyweight Final |
| Welterweight 77 kg | (Russia) Aslambek Saidov | def. | (Brazil) Sam Quito | TKO (Punches) | 1 | 1:28 | |
| Bantamweight 61 kg | (Russia) Petr Yan | def. | (Russia) Murad Kalamov | Decision (Unanimous) | 3 | 5:00 | Grand Prix Berkut 2015 Bantamweight Final |
| Light Heavyweight 93 kg | (Russia) Muslim Makhmudov | def. | (Russia) Husein Kushagov | Submission (Guillotine Choke) | 1 | 2:33 | Grand Prix Berkut 2015 Light Heavyweight Final |
| Lightweight 70 kg | (Russia) Andrey Koshkin | def. | (Poland) Adrian Zieliński | Decision (Unanimous) | 3 | 5:00 | |
| Bantamweight 61 kg | (Russia) Magomed Magomedov | def. | (Brazil) Bruno Dias | Decision (Unanimous) | 3 | 5:00 | |

== ACB 25: Young Eagles 3 ==
ACB 25: Young Eagles 3
- Promotion: Absolute Championship Berkut
- Date: November 7, 2015
- Venue: Arena Coliseum
- City: Grozny, Russia

Absolute Championship Berkut 25: Young Eagles 3 was a mixed martial arts event held by Absolute Championship Berkut on November 7, 2015, at the Arena Coliseum in Grozny, Russia.

=== Results ===
Fight Card
| Weight Class | | | | Method | Round | Time | Notes |
|---|---|---|---|---|---|---|---|
| Lightweight 70 kg | (Russia) Magomed Raisov | def. | (Bulgaria) Georgi Stoyanov | Decision (Unanimous) | 3 | 5:00 | |
| Middleweight 84 kg | (Russia) Azamat Amagov | def. | (Greece) Panagiotis Stroumpoulis | Decision (Unanimous) | 3 | 5:00 | |
| Lightweight 70 kg | (Russia) Rim Khaziakhmetov | def. | (Russia) Shamsanur Magomadov | KO (Punch) | 1 | 1:03 | |
| Featherweight 66 kg | (Russia) Alikhan Suleimanov | def. | (Ukraine) Artur Kascheev | Submission (Rear Naked Choke) | 1 | 1:16 | |
| Welterweight 77 kg | (Russia) Arsen Tengizov | def. | (Russia) Islam Yashaev | KO (Punch) | 2 | 1:37 | |
| Lightweight 70 kg | (Ukraine) Roman Ogulchanskiy | def. | (Russia) Ilyas Khaipaev | Decision (Unanimous) | 3 | 5:00 | |

== ACB KB 4: Grand Prix Final ==
ACB KB 4: Grand Prix Final
- Promotion: Absolute Championship Berkut
- Date: November 13, 2015
- Venue: Sukharev Sport Complex
- City: Perm, Russia

Event chronology
| ACB 30 | ACB KB 4: Grand Prix Final | ACB 31 |

Absolute Championship Berkut Kickboxing 4: Grand Prix Final was a Kickboxing event held by Absolute Championship Berkut on November 13, 2015, at the Sukharev Sport Complex in Perm, Russia.

=== Results ===
Fight Card
| Weight Class | | | | Method | Round | Notes |
|---|---|---|---|---|---|---|
| KB Lightweight 70 kg | (Russia) Khambakhadov Saifullah | def. | (Russia) Kazbek Zubayrayev | Decision (Unanimous) | 3 | Grand Prix Final |
| KB Bantamweight 61 kg | (Serbia) Alexandar Konovalov | def. | (Russia) Yakub Bersanukaev | KO (Punch) | 1 | Grand Prix Final |
| KB Lightweight 70 kg | (Russia) Maxim Smirnov | def. | (Denmark) Rhassan Muhareb | Decision (Unanimous) | 3 | |
| KB Welterweight 77 kg | (Morocco) Zakaria Baitar | def. | (Russia) Alexander Stetsurenko | TKO (Punches) | 1 | |
| KB Welterweight 77 kg | (Azerbaijan) Alim Nabiev | def. | (Netherlands) Masoud Rahimi | Decision (Unanimous) | 3 | |
| KB Catchweight 86 kg | (Latvia) Artem Mirontsev | def. | (Russia) Renat Akhmetov | Decision (Unanimous) | 3 | |
| KB Catchweight 67 kg | (Russia) Lom-Ali Eskijew | def. | (Russia) Sergei Yelshin | Decision (Unanimous) | 3 | |
| KB Catchweight 75 kg | (Russia) Islam Beybatyrov | def. | (Russia) Rasoul Eshivov | Decision (Unanimous) | 3 | |
| KB Flymweight 57 kg | (Russia) Buvaisar Paskhayev | vs. | (Azerbaijan) Ramiz Mamedov | Decision (Unanimous) | 3 | |
| KB Lightweight 70 kg | (Russia) Maxim Kolpak | def. | (Russia) Arbi Emiev | Decision (Unanimous) | 3 | |
| KB Catchweight 67 kg | (Russia) Vlad Ukrainets | def. | (Russia) Rustam Avilov | Decision (Unanimous) | 3 | |

== ACB 26: Grand Prix 2015 Finals Stage 3 ==
ACB 26: Grand Prix Berkut 2015 Finals Stage 3
- Promotion: Absolute Championship Berkut
- Date: November 28, 2015
- Venue: Arena Coliseum
- City: Grozny, Russia

Absolute Championship Berkut 26: Grand Prix Berkut 2015 Finals Stage 3 was a mixed martial arts event held by Absolute Championship Berkut on November 28, 2015, at the Arena Coliseum in Grozny, Russia.

=== Results ===
Fight Card
| Weight Class | | | | Method | Round | Time | Notes |
|---|---|---|---|---|---|---|---|
| Flyweight 57 kg | (Russia) Velimurad Alkhasov | def. | (Ukraine) Ruslan Abiltarov | KO (Punch) | 2 | 1:55 | Grand Prix Berkut 2015 Flyweight Final |
| Welterweight 77 kg | (Russia) Beslan Isaev | def. | (Brazil) Junior de Oliveira | TKO (Retirement) | 3 | 1:05 | |
| Middleweight 84 kg | (Russia) Arbi Aguev | def. | (Poland) Antoni Chmielewski | TKO (Punches) | 2 | 3:37 | |
| Welterweight 77 kg | (Russia) Sergey Khandozhko | def. | (Cuba) Guillermo Martinez Ayme | Decision (Majority) | 3 | 5:00 | |
| Middleweight 84 kg | (Russia) Muslim Khizriev | def. | (Brazil) Júlio César Santos | Decision (Unanimous) | 3 | 5:00 | |
| Lightweight 70 kg | (Russia) Shamil Nikaev | def. | (Russia) Roman Avdalyan | Submission (Keylock) | 2 | 4:12 | |

== ACB 27: Tajikistan ==
ACB 27: Tajikistan
- Promotion: Absolute Championship Berkut
- Date: December 20, 2015
- Venue: Sports Complex "20 Years of Independence"
- City: Dushanbe, Tajikistan

Absolute Championship Berkut 27: Tajikistan was a mixed martial arts event held by Absolute Championship Berkut on December 20, 2015, at the Sports Complex "20 Years of Independence" in Dushanbe, Tajikistan.

=== Results ===
Fight Card
| Weight Class | | | | Method | Round | Time | Notes |
|---|---|---|---|---|---|---|---|
| Lightweight 70 kg | (Russia) Eduard Vartanyan | def. | (Russia) Magomedrasul Khasbulaev | Decision (Unanimous) | 3 | 5:00 | |
| Light Heavyweight 93 kg | (Russia) Gadzhimurad Antigulov | def. | (Brazil) Jorge Bezerra | TKO (Punches) | 1 | 2:15 | |
| Lightweight 70 kg | (Russia) Abdul-Aziz Abdulvakhabov | def. | (Brazil) Julio Cesar de Almeida | TKO (Punches) | 3 | 1:37 | |
| Catchweight 80 kg | (Germany) Abu Azaitar | def. | (Russia) Ibragim Tibilov | TKO (Punches) | 1 | 1:53 | |
| Lightweight 70 kg | (Ukraine) Vladislav Stepanov | def. | (Tajikistan) Firdavs Nazarov | TKO (Knee Injury) | 1 | 2:22 | |
| Middleweight 84 kg | (Russia) Abdul-Rakhman Dzhanaev | def. | (Kyrgyzstan) Abdisamat uulu Durusbek | KO (Spinning Back Fist) | 1 | 0:49 | |

== ACB 28: Young Eagles 4 ==
ACB 28: Young Eagles 4
- Promotion: Absolute Championship Berkut
- Date: December 27, 2015
- Venue: Sports Complex "Gladiator", Lenin Plaza
- City: Nalchik, Russia

Absolute Championship Berkut 28: Young Eagles 4 was a mixed martial arts event held by Absolute Championship Berkut on December 27, 2015, at the Sports Complex "Gladiator", Lenin Plaza in Nalchik, Russia.

=== Results ===
Fight Card
| Weight Class | | | | Method | Round | Time | Notes |
|---|---|---|---|---|---|---|---|
| Welterweight 77 kg | (Russia) Mukhamed Berkhamov | def. | (Colombia) R. Landaeta Utrera | Submission (Armbar) | 3 | 4:45 | |
| Lightweight 70 kg | (Russia) Said-Khamzat Avkhadov | def. | (Tajikistan) Davlat Olimov | TKO (Punches) | 2 | 2:55 | |
| Middleweight 84 kg | (Turkey) Ibragim Chuzhigaev | def. | (Russia) Mirlan Tilekbaev | Submission (Arm Triangle Choke) | 2 | 3:23 | |
| Featherweight 66 kg | (Russia) Temryuk Berkhamov | def. | (Ukraine) Aleksandr Podlesniy | Submission (Anaconda Choke) | 2 | 2:28 | |
| Featherweight 66 kg | (Russia) Maharbek Karginov | def. | (Russia) Arsen Ubaidulaev | Submission (Rear Naked Choke) | 1 | 3:05 | |
| Featherweight 66 kg | (Russia) Adlan Bataev | def. | (Russia) Oleg Peterimov | Decision (Unanimous) | 3 | 5:00 | |
