= Abdul-Aziz Abdulvakhabov =

Russian mixed martial arts fighter

- Born: Абдул-Азиз Абдулвахабов; January 16, 1989 (age 37); Sernovodskoye, Chechnya, Russia
- Other names: Lion
- Nationality: Chechen
- Height: 5 ft 9 in (175 cm)
- Weight: 155 lb (70 kg; 11 st 1 lb)
- Division: Lightweight
- Reach: 71 in (180 cm)
- Fighting out of: Grozny, Russia
- Team: Berkut FC
- Years active: 2011–present

Mixed martial arts record
- Total: 25
- Wins: 23
- By knockout: 9
- By submission: 6
- By decision: 8
- Losses: 2
- By decision: 2

Other information
- Mixed martial arts record from Sherdog

Submission grappling record
- Total: 1
- Wins: 1
- Losses: 0
- Draws: 0

Abdul-Aziz Abdulvakhabov (born January 16, 1989) is a Russian mixed martial artist who competes in the Lightweight division of the Absolute Championship Akhmat (ACA), where he is the current ACA Lightweight Champion. Abdulvakhabov has reached #15 in World Lightweight rankings according to Fight Matrix.

== Background ==
The fighter was born in the village of Sernovodsky, the administrative center of the Sernovodsky district, located in the west of the Chechen Republic. From the age of 7 years, he began to get involved in sports. As a child, little Aziz was fond of football - like the rest of the rural boys, he played the ball with pleasure. The desire to become a wrestler appeared in Abdulvakhabov in his teens. An older brother played a big role in this, who taught the younger ones to play sports and box. At that time, hostilities were taking place in Chechnya, therefore, despite the desire of Abdul-Aziz to engage in wrestling, he did not have the opportunity for this.

Abdul-Aziz decided to get an education in Moscow, where he moved at the age of 17. Abdulvakhabov entered the Faculty of Law and combined his studies with training in freestyle wrestling. A year later, Abdul-Aziz, following the advice of his brother, began to engage in hand-to-hand combat. A month later, the coach put the young athlete to the championship of the Moscow region, where the Chechen won. After spending 2 years on the mats, the fighter met Akhmed Musaev, from whom he received and accepted an offer to start practicing hand-to-hand combat and combat sambo.

He has a submission grappling win over Eduard Vartanyan by decision, at ACB JJ 14 on 30 of June 2018 in the under 80 kg/176 lbs category.

== Mixed martial arts career ==
=== Early career ===
A year and a half after the start of training with a new coach, Abdul-Aziz began his journey in mixed martial arts with a one-day tournament from the ProFC organization, where he beat Salim Kaslukov, but in the second fight he was defeated by unanimous decision from Magomed Alkhasov, who was more experienced at that time. Upon his return to canvas, he began to actively close this defeat and, under the sign of various promotions, winning 3 victories in 2 months, after which he took a break for a year and a half. After 2 more victories, and then completely signed up for the ACB organization.

=== Absolute Championship Akhmat ===
April 6, 2014 was a special date for Abdulaziz. On this day, his first fight took place in the ACB promotion (since 2018 - ACA). The fighter refused to participate in the first round, as he was seriously injured the day before. But Abdulvakhabov was still destined to get there: a fighter dropped out of the second round of the tournament, and Aziz had recovered his health by that time and came on as a substitute. The rival was Islam Makoev at ACB 5, who did not have a single defeat on his account. The fight was difficult for both athletes, but the judges unanimously gave the victory to Aziz, who advanced to the semifinals. In the semi-finals at ACB 7, he would go on to defeat Rasul Ediev in the second round, submitting him with a guillotine.

During this time, it became clear that the fighter's injury was severe and required surgery. Despite this, the athlete continued to participate in the competition. In the final duel Abdulvakhabov met with an experienced fighter Ali Bagov at ACB 9. In the third round, Aziz knocked out Bagov with a spinning back kick and received the ACB Lightweight Championship. After that, Abdul-Aziz took a break for a year to improve his health and rehabilitate.

The return of the athlete was bright - a victory over Vadim Rasul at ACB 17. The next to fall were Zulfikar Usmanov at ACB 22 and Julio Cesar De Almeida at ACB 27. These fights were not title fights, so Aziz still had the belt.

The first defense of the champion title in the lightweight category took place in Moscow at ACB 32. The rival of the Chechen was Eduard Vartanyan, who he defeated via TKO stoppage in the first round.

In 2016, within the framework of ACB 48, Abdul-Aziz rematched Ali Bagov. From the first minutes of the fight, Ali was in the lead, but he did not go to the second round for health reasons. During this fight, Aziz's old injury also made itself felt. The fighter's knee was operated on, and for a long time he was in rehabilitation.

A year later, the main event of ACB 77 was the fight between Abdulvakhabov and Eduard Vartanyan. For the first time in Aziz's career, an exhausting duel lasted all the prescribed five rounds. The victory was awarded to the defending champion, and he retained the title.

In 2018, the third meeting of Abdul-Aziz and Ali Bagov took place as part of the ACB 89 competition. In the title fight, the champion lost to his opponent in a close bout via majority decision, and the belt went to Bagov.

The following year, Abdul-Azis was booked to face Marcin Held at ACA 92, but he was replaced by Brian Foster, who was submitted via arm-trainle choke in the first round, and then Imanali Gamzatkhanov at ACA 99, who followed in the footsteps of the American, being submitted via rear-naked choke in the second round.

In 2020, Abdulvakhabov got a chance to reclaim the title against Alexander Sarnavsky at the ACA 111, which the Chechen won via unanimous decision to win the bout and regain the belt.

Abdulvakhabov defended his title against former UFC veteran Hacran Dias on November 5, 2021, at ACA 131: Abdulvakhabov vs. Dias. He won the close bout via split decision.

An ACA Lightweight Championship unification bout between Abdulvakhabov and interim champion Mukhamed Kokov at ACA 162. However, for health reasons the bout was postponed to ACA 164 on October 4.

The bout against Kokov was rescheduled for ACA 164: Abdulvakhabov vs. Kokov on October 4, 2023 as part of the 2023 ACA Lightweight Grand Prix Quarterfinal. Abdulvakhabov unified the title and advanced to the semi-finals, stopping Kokov in the second round after dropping Kokov with an elbow against the fence and then winning by ground and pound TKO.

== Championships and accomplishments ==
=== Mixed martial arts ===
- Absolute Championship Akhmat
  - ACA Lightweight Championship (Two Times, current)
    - Five successful title defenses (overall)
      - Three successful title defenses (first reign)
      - Two successful title defenses (second reign)

== Mixed martial arts record ==
Professional record breakdown
25 matches	23 wins	2 losses
By knockout	9	0
By submission	6	0
By decision	8	2

Res.	Record	Opponent	Method	Event	Date	Round	Time	Location	Notes
Win	23–2	Gleison Tibau	Decision (unanimous)	ACA 208	October 4, 2026	3	5:00	Grozny, Russia	Welterweight debut.
Win	22–2	Ali Bagov	KO (punch)	ACA 189	July 11, 2025	2	1:11	Grozny, Russia	Won the 2023 ACA Lightweight Grand Prix. Defended the ACA Lightweight Championship. Performance of the Night.
Win	21–2	Ali Abdulkhalikov	Decision (split)	ACA 182	December 14, 2024	5	5:00	Moscow, Russia	2023 ACA Lightweight Grand Prix Semifinal. Defended the ACA Lightweight Championship.
Win	20–2	Mukhamed Kokov	TKO (punches)	ACA 164	October 4, 2023	2	1:55	Grozny, Russia	2023 ACA Lightweight Grand Prix Quarterfinal. Defended and unified the ACA Lightweight Championship. Performance of the Night.
Win	19–2	Hacran Dias	Decision (split)	ACA 131	November 5, 2021	5	5:00	Moscow, Russia	Defended the ACA Lightweight Championship.
Win	18–2	Alexander Sarnavskiy	Decision (unanimous)	ACA 111	September 19, 2020	5	5:00	Moscow, Russia	Won the vacant ACA Lightweight Championship.
Win	17–2	Imanali Gamzatkhanov	Submission (rear-naked choke)	ACA 99	September 27, 2019	2	4:21	Moscow, Russia	
Win	16–2	Brian Foster	Submission (arm-triangle choke)	ACA 92	February 16, 2019	1	1:36	Warsaw, Poland	
Loss	15–2	Ali Bagov	Decision (majority)	ACB 89	September 8, 2018	3	5:00	Krasnodar, Russia	Lost the ACA Lightweight Championship.
Win	15–1	Eduard Vartanyan	Decision (split)	ACB 77	December 23, 2017	5	5:00	Moscow, Russia	Defended and unified the ACB Lightweight Championship.
Win	14–1	Ali Bagov	TKO (retirement)	ACB 48	October 22, 2016	1	5:00	Moscow, Russia	Defended the ACA Lightweight Championship.
Win	13–1	Eduard Vartanyan	TKO (punches)	ACB 32	March 26, 2016	1	2:53	Moscow, Russia	Defended the ACB Lightweight Championship.
Win	12–1	Julio Cesar de Almeida	KO (punch)	ACB 27	December 20, 2015	2	1:57	Dushanbe, Tajikistan	
Win	11–1	Zulfikar Usmanov	TKO (doctor stoppage)	ACB 22	September 12, 2015	1	4:47	Saint Petersburg, Russia	
Win	10–1	Vadim Russul	Submission (rear-naked choke)	ACB 17	May 2, 2015	1	4:59	Tolstoy-Yurt, Russia	
Win	9–1	Ali Bagov	KO (spinning back kick)	ACB 9	June 22, 2014	3	3:36	Grozny, Russia	Won the 2014 ACB Lightweight Grand Prix and the inaugural ACB Lightweight Championship.
Win	8–1	Rasul Ediev	Submission (guillotine choke)	ACB 7	May 18, 2014	2	0:45	Grozny, Russia	2014 ACB Lightweight Grand Prix Semifinal.
Win	7–1	Islam Makoev	Decision (unanimous)	ACB 5	April 6, 2014	2	5:00	Grozny, Russia	
Win	6–1	Aktilek Zhumabek	Decision (unanimous)	Alash Pride: Great Battle 2	December 19, 2013	3	5:00	Almaty, Kazakhstan	
Win	5–1	Garik Aivazyan	Submission (anaconda choke)	Fight Nights Global 18	October 4, 2013	1	4:24	Grozny, Russia	Catchweight (165 lb) bout.
Win	4–1	Sergei Bal	Submission (arm-triangle choke)	Deadly Bet 2012	April 27, 2012	2	3:20	Moscow, Russia	
Win	3–1	Andrey Markovich	Decision (unanimous)	S-70: Russian Grand Prix 2011 (Stage 3)	April 6, 2012	3	5:00	Moscow, Russia	
Win	2–1	Ilya Gomelyuk	TKO (punches)	Corona Cup 22	March 2, 2012	3	N/A	Moscow, Russia	Featherweight bout.
Loss	1–1	Magomed Alkhasov	Decision (unanimous)	ProFC 33: Global Grand Prix (Stage 2)	September 26, 2011	2	5:00	Derbent, Russia	
Win	1–0	Salim Kaskulov	TKO (punches)	ProFC 33: Global Grand Prix (Stage 2)	September 26, 2011	1	4:24	Derbent, Russia	Lightweight debut.

== Submission grappling record ==
1 Matches, 1 Wins, 0 Losses, 0 Draw
Win	1–0–0	(Russia) Eduard Vartanyan	Decision (Points)	ACBJJ 14	June 30, 2018	Moscow, Russia

== See also ==
- List of current ACA fighters
- List of male mixed martial artists
