= Sergey Khandozhko =

Russian mixed martial arts fighter

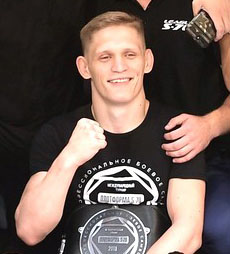
- Born: Сергей Хандожко; May 19, 1992 (age 34); Torzhok, Tver Oblast, Russia
- Other names: Honda
- Nationality: Russian
- Height: 6 ft 1 in (1.85 m)
- Weight: 170 lb (77 kg; 12 st 2 lb)
- Division: Welterweight
- Reach: 74.0 in (188 cm)
- Style: Ashihara Karate
- Fighting out of: Moscow, Russia
- Team: Fight Club No. 1
- Years active: 2011–2022

Mixed martial arts record
- Total: 34
- Wins: 27
- By knockout: 11
- By submission: 7
- By decision: 8
- Unknown: 1
- Losses: 6
- By knockout: 1
- By submission: 2
- By decision: 3
- Draws: 1

Other information
- Mixed martial arts record from Sherdog

Sergey Khandozhko (born May 19, 1992) is a retired Russian male mixed martial artist who competed in the Welterweight division of the Ultimate Fighting Championship.

== Background ==
While in the first grade, his parents signed Sergey to the sambo/judo. In the military camp, he got jaundice, passed the full course of treatment in the local hospital, upon arrival in his native town, he was recovering for half a year, with his motor activity being kept to a minimum and having a strict diet. Then he began practicing karate at the age of 15, which was supposed to be a very late age for this kind of martial arts, but a year later he was Champion of Moscow and Russia in Ashihara Karate. Then his family moved to Odintsovo, where his father, being a military man, got an apartment. Hee joined the martial arts because he couldn't find a karate coach.

By the adolescence keenness for sports went down. Having recovered, he went to the hand-to-hand fighting section at the age of 14-15, where he took karate, his trainer - Alexander Ivanovich Zhokin. Since the age of 16 Khandozhko became more than one champion of Moscow and Russia in his weight, but did not have a corresponding belt.

In October 2010 became a winner at the World Championship in all-round combat. In 2011 took the 1st place at the IX Open Championship of the Kryukovo Municipality in the hand-to-hand fighting (punkration version) in the category up to 80 kg., 2nd place in the category up to 80 kg at the Cup in the hand-to-hand fighting, 2nd place at the Championship of Russia in the universal fighting in the category up to 80 kg., 1st place in the championship in hand-to-hand fighting "Russian Bogatyr". In June - the winner of amateur championship on MMA in the category up to 85 kg. July - 1st place in the category up to 80 kg. on the European Championship on Universal Fighting; October - 1st place on the World Championship on Universal Fighting. During the same period became bronze medalist of the Moscow Open MMA Championship among men over 18 in the category up to 80 kg.

Since 2018, he has been acting director of the State Budgetary Institution of the KK of the sports school "Regional Martial Arts Center".

== Mixed martial arts career ==
=== Early career ===
Making his professional MMA debut in 2011 against Dmitry Lapatin, winning by technical knockout in the first round. Studying at the university of the system of the Ministry of Internal Affairs of Russia and not having enough time for full-fledged training, they studied with a classmate V. Myasnikov in the kitchen of the hostel. He suffered his first defeat from Eduard Vartanyan in May 2013 at the Legend tournament, where Alexander Emelianenko and Bob Sapp met in the main battle.

Khandozhko compiled a 25–5–1 record fighting on the Russian regional scene, fighting most notably with Absolute Championship Berkut, where he faced the likes of future ACA Welterweight champ and fellow UFC fighter Albert Duraev, losing by the way of unanimous decision, but also the likes of Ben Alloway, who he lost to via rear-naked choke in the third round.

In the bout right before signing with the UFC, Khandozhko faced Adriano Rodrigues at S-70: Plotforma Cup 2018, where he won the bout via body kick KO in the second round.

=== Ultimate Fighting Championship ===
Khandozhko was expected to make his UFC debut against Bartosz Fabiński on June 1, 2019, at UFC Fight Night: Gustafsson vs. Smith, but Fabiński pulled out due to injury and was replaced by Rostem Akman. Sergey won the bout via unanimous decision.

Khandozhko's next fight was scheduled for UFC Fight Night: Cowboy vs. Gaethje on September 14, 2019, against Michel Pereira. Sergey would face visa issues and was replaced by the Canadian Tristan Connelly

Khandozhko faced Rustam Khabilov on 9 November 2019 at UFC Fight Night: Magomedsharipov vs. Kattar. He lost the fight via unanimous decision.

Khandozhko was scheduled to face Nicolas Dalby on 26 June 2021 at UFC Fight Night: Gane vs. Volkov. However, Khandozhko pulled out due to knee injury and was replaced by Tim Means.

Khandozhko was scheduled to face David Zawada on September 4, 2021, at UFC Fight Night: Brunson vs. Till. However, the week before the event, Khandozhko was pulled from the contest for unknown reasons and replaced by Alex Morono.

After over two years away from the sport, Khandozhko returned face Dwight Grant on April 23, 2022, at UFC Fight Night: Lemos vs. Andrade. He won the fight via technical knockout in the second round. This fight earned him the Fight of the Night award.

On November 1, 2022, Khandozhko announced his retirement from MMA to focus on coaching youth.

== Championships and accomplishments ==
- Ultimate Fighting Championship
  - Fight of the Night (One time) vs. Dwight Grant

== Mixed martial arts record ==
Professional record breakdown
34 matches	27 wins	6 losses
By knockout	11	1
By submission	7	2
By decision	8	3
Unknown	1	0
Draws	1	

Res.	Record	Opponent	Method	Event	Date	Round	Time	Location	Notes
Win	27–6–1	Dwight Grant	TKO (punches)	UFC Fight Night: Lemos vs. Andrade	April 23, 2022	2	4:15	Las Vegas, Nevada, United States	Fight of the Night
Loss	26–6–1	Rustam Khabilov	Decision (unanimous)	UFC Fight Night: Magomedsharipov vs. Kattar	November 9, 2019	3	5:00	Moscow, Russia	
Win	26–5–1	Rostem Akman	Decision (unanimous)	UFC Fight Night: Gustafsson vs. Smith	June 1, 2019	3	5:00	Stockholm, Sweden	
Win	25–5–1	Adriano Rodrigues	KO (kick to the body)	S-70: Plotforma Cup 2018	August 22, 2018	2	3:19	Sochi, Russia	
Win	24–5–1	Miller Couto	Submission (rear-naked choke)	Golden Team Championship 4	May 26, 2018	2	4:59	Mytishchi, Russia	
Loss	23–5–1	Stanislav Vlasenko	Submission (triangle choke)	ACB 68	August 26, 2017	3	3:34	Dushanbe, Tajikistan	
Win	23–4–1	Stanislav Vlasenko	Decision (split)	ACB 55	March 24, 2017	3	5:00	Dushanbe, Tajikistan	
Loss	22–4–1	Benny Alloway	Submission (rear-naked choke)	ACB 48	October 22, 2016	3	3:09	Moscow, Russia	
Win	22–3–1	Mauricio Machado	KO (head kick)	ACB 38	May 20, 2016	1	0:05	Rostov-on-Don, Russia	
Loss	21–3–1	Patrik Kincl	Decision (unanimous)	ACB 32	March 26, 2016	3	5:00	Moscow, Russia	
Win	21–2–1	Guillermo Martinez Ayme	Decision (unanimous)	ACB 26	November 28, 2015	3	5:00	Grozny, Russia	
Loss	20–2–1	Albert Duraev	Decision (unanimous)	ACB 20	June 14, 2015	3	5:00	Sochi, Russia	
Win	20–1–1	Sergey Faley	TKO (punches)	ACB 16	April 17, 2015	1	3:20	Moscow, Russia	
Win	19–1–1	Vasily Fedorych	TKO (punches)	Fight Star: Battle on Sura 3	February 22, 2015	2	N/A	Penza, Russia	
Win	18–1–1	Anton Radman	Decision (unanimous)	White Rex: Warriors Spirit 33	October 26, 2014	3	5:00	Saint Petersburg, Russia	
Win	17–1–1	Marco Santi	Decision (unanimous)	White Rex: Warrior Spirit 27	March 29, 2014	3	5:00	Moscow, Russia	
Win	16–1–1	Felipe Nsue	Submission (armbar)	Tyumen Fight	February 1, 2014	2	4:59	Tyumen, Russia	Middleweight bout
Win	15–1–1	Alexey Poda	TKO (punches)	Oplot MMA: White Collars 28	December 27, 2013	1	1:42	Kharkiv, Ukraine	
Win	14–1–1	Marvin Ademaj	Decision (unanimous)	White Rex: The Birth of a Nation	October 4, 2013	3	5:00	Moscow, Russia	
Loss	13–1–1	Eduard Vartanyan	TKO (punches)	Legend: Emelianenko vs. Sapp	May 25, 2013	2	4:00	Moscow, Russia	
Win	13–0–1	Simone Tessari	Submission (rear-naked choke)	Overtime Cup 2013	April 27, 2013	1	2:11	Moscow, Russia	
Win	12–0–1	Martin Seferbekov	Decision (unanimous)	Fight Riot 1	January 25, 2013	3	5:00	Voronezh, Russia	
Win	11–0–1	Ilya Martisyuk	Submission (rear-naked choke)	M-1 Global: M-1 Fighter 2012 Grand Finale	December 16, 2012	1	3:02	Moscow, Russia	Lightweight bout
Win	10–0–1	Wiktor Sobczyk	KO (punch)	ProFC 42: Oplot Challenge	October 13, 2012	1	0:29	Kharkiv, Ukraine	
Draw	9–0–1	Anton Kotyukov	Draw (split)	Lion's Fights 2	September 2, 2012	2	5:00	Kolpino, Russia	
Win	9–0	Vitaly Lazovskiy	KO (knees and punches)	R.O.D: Shield And Sword 2	May 25, 2012	1	3:25	Moscow, Russia	Return to Welterweight
Win	8–0	Marat Bekmuratov	TKO (punches)	Cracked Ice Cup 2012	April 8, 2012	1	0:39	Moscow, Russia	
Win	7–0	Viktor Shishunin	TKO (knee to the body)	R.O.D.: Spear Of Peresvet 2012	February 25, 2012	1	3:20	Sergiyev Posad, Russia	
Win	6–0	Magomedsalam Kaynurov	Decision (unanimous)	Voronezh Interregional 2012	January 20, 2012	2	5:00	Voronezh, Russia	Return to Middleweight
Win	5–0	Babyrbek Samiev	Submission (triangle choke)	Chekhov Fight Night 2011	December 24, 2011	1	1:40	Chekhov, Russia	Welterweight debut
Win	4–0	Marat Bekmuratov	Submission (guillotine choke)	WPFL: Panfight Championship 4	October 29, 2011	1	2:24	Moscow, Russia	
Win	3–0	Andrey Markovich	Submission (triangle choke)	Freestyle Fight 2	October 15, 2011	1	4:20	Moscow, Russia	Return to Middleweight
Win	2–0	Magomedsalam Kaynurov	KO (punches)	Radmer Cup 1	August 15, 2011	1	4:10	Sterlitamak, Russia	Lightweight debut
Win	1–0	Dmitriy Lapatin	TKO (punches)	WPFL: Panfight Championship 1	July 30, 2011	1	3:15	Moscow, Russia	Middleweight debut

== See also ==
- List of male mixed martial artists
