= Anatoly Tokov =

Russian mixed martial arts fighter

Anatoly Aleksandrovich Tokov
- Born: 17 February 1990 (age 36); Tobolsk, Russian SFSR, Soviet Union
- Native name: Анатолий Токов
- Nationality: Russian
- Height: 5 ft 10 in (178 cm)
- Weight: 185 lb (84 kg; 13 st 3 lb)
- Division: Middleweight
- Reach: 73 in (185 cm)
- Style: ARB, Boxing, Sambo, Wrestling, Pankration
- Fighting out of: Stary Oskol, Belgorod, Russia
- Team: Red Devil Sport Club/Aleksandr Nevsky
- Trainer: Andrei Sabarov
- Rank: Master of Sport in Hand to Hand combat
- Years active: 2009 –present (MMA)

Mixed martial arts record
- Total: 36
- Wins: 32
- By knockout: 17
- By submission: 7
- By decision: 8
- Losses: 4
- By knockout: 1
- By decision: 3

Other information
- Mixed martial arts record from Sherdog

Anatoly Aleksandrovich Tokov (Russian: Анатолий Александрович Токов; born 17 February 1990) is a Russian mixed martial artist currently fighting in the Middleweight division. Tokov has previously fought in promotions such as:Bellator MMA, M-1 Global, Fight Nights Global, Rizin Fighting Federation and Absolute Championship Berkut where Tokov became the one-time Middleweight champion.

== Background ==
Anatoly Tokov was born on February 17, 1990, in the city of Tobolsk, in the Tyumen region to a Russian father and Kabardian mother. From adolescence, the boy liked to watch action films with the participation of Jean Claude Van Damme, Jackie Chan and Chuck Norris, which determined his hobbies in the future. Tokov took the first steps at age 15, enrolling in the hand-to-hand combat section under the guidance of trainer Andrei Mikhailovich Sabarov. Just three years after the start of training, he achieved an outstanding result - a victory at the national championship in hand-to-hand combat. A year later, he decided to move to the rapidly gaining popularity of mixed martial arts and decided to pursue a career in mixed martial arts following the birth of his first daughter at the age of 18. Tokov initially wanted to train and pursue a career in boxing; however, in his city of Tobolsk, only hand-to-hand combat was available. Tokov also would have pursued a career in judo, although this dream was short lived for it was too difficult to commit with because of the distance required to travel to train.

He achieved his first success at the adult level in the 2008 season, when he became the champion of Russia in the ARB, won several tournaments of Russian and international significance, and fulfilled the standard of a master of sports. He also competed several times in pankration and combat sambo tournaments.

== Professional career ==
In 2009, Tokov joined the fighting club Red Devil Fighting Team after being invited, along with Sidelnikov, the Nemkov brothers and Moldavsky, to become a part of Fedor Emelianenko's fight team to help as preparation for Emelianenko's comeback into professional mixed martial arts. He made his professional debut not long afterwards at the qualifying tournament of the M-1 Global organization in St. Petersburg, defeating his opponent Anatoly Vintovkin by technical knockout with Nemkov at the 2nd minute of the 2nd round finishing the fight with powerful knee blows to the body. Over the next two years, he had six victorious fights, including winning the M-1 Challenge tournament in Astrakhan. He suffered the first defeat in his career in December 2011 by knockout from Magomed Magomedkerimov at the Russian Championship under the S-70 League. Already at the start of the fight, Magomed transferred Anatoly to a defensive position, lying on his back and delivered a knockout blow to the jaw. In 2012, he participated in the M-1 Fighter reality show, broadcast on the Fighter TV channel, and won all three grand prix fights there.

Tokov continued to fight in various Russian promotions between 2012 and 2015, winning 15 fights in a row, creating an impressive MMA record of 21-1 in particular, he defeated experienced fighters such as Albert Duraev, Magomed Ismailov, and Jordan Smith. For 3 years, Anatoly took part in a large number of tournaments, including M-1, DIA and S-70 League, having established himself as one of the best middleweights in Russian MMA.

In 2015, he visited the Rizin Fighting Federation tournament in Japan with Fedor Emelianenko, and knocked American fighter A.J. Matthews in the first round.

Anatoly had to fight with the Chechen fighter Arbi Aguev in the 2015 ACB Lightweight Grand Prix Finals for inaugural ACB Middleweight Championship . In the first 3 rounds, the advantage passed from one athlete to another - both fighters showed beautiful combinations in striking technique, however, Tokov was better at fighting on the ground. At the end of the 3rd round, Aguev makes an attempt to throw the opponent over the thigh, but he himself finds himself below and takes several powerful blows to the head - a gong saves the Chechen athlete from a possible knockout. In round 4, Arby looks more tired and begins to miss more and more direct single blows. At the 4th minute of the round, Anatoly takes the opponent to the ground and carries out a series of finishing blows, after which the referee stops the fight, and Tokov goes to get ready to receive the championship belt.

After leaving ACB due to a contract dispute, He also had one fight in the Fight Nights promotion, where he defeated the representative of Serbia, Vladimir Filipovich, by unanimous decision.

Six months later, Tokov participates in the M-1 Challenge 73 tournament, where he suffers his 2nd defeat in MMA. Ramazan Emeev managed to win the close bout via majority decision.

=== Bellator MMA ===
In 2017, he signed a contract with the major American organization Bellator MMA and made his debut on the North American continent in February, defeating Francisco France at Bellator 172 by technical knockout.

The second match in the promotion at Bellator 200, Anatoly already in the first minute of the first round grabbed Vladimir Filipovich's neck and choked him out with a guillotine.

Tokov was expected to face John Salter at Bellator 188 on November 16, 2017. However, Tokov pulled out of the bout due to an ACL injury and was replaced by Jason Radcliffe.

In October 2018, he met in the Bellator cage with the titled compatriot Alexander Shlemenko at Bellator 208. The fight turned out to be equal and protracted - in the 15 minutes allotted by the regulations for the duel, none of the fighters could finish the confrontation ahead of schedule. After the end of the 3rd round, Anatoly was recognized as the best by the unanimous decision of the judges.

After successful fights in Bellator, Tokov signed a new, more profitable contract with the promotion for another 3 fights.

On March 22, 2019, he fought his fourth fight in Bellator at Bellator 218 against Gerald Harris. In the first round, Tokov was on the verge of defeat, having been knocked down, but managed to recover and return to the fight, and by the second round he was able to finish the bout via guillotine and win the fight.

Tokov's last fight in Bellator in 2019 was against Hracho Darpinyan at Bellator 229, in which he finished the fight with a TKO stoppage with elbows from crucifix.

After a long layoff, Tokov returned on October 23, 2021, at Bellator 269 against Sharaf Davlatmurodov, winning the bout via split decision.

After the win, Tokov signed another long term contract with the promotion.

In his only bout of 2022, Tokov faced Muhammad Abdullah on June 24, 2022, at Bellator 282, finishing the bout in the first round via ground and pound TKO stoppage.

Tokov faced reigning champ Johnny Eblen for the Bellator Middleweight Championship on February 4, 2023, at Bellator 290. He lost the bout via unanimous decision.

=== Return to Russia ===
Tokov had a one off bout with ACA, defeating Sharaf Davlatmurodov on April 19, 2024 at ACA 174 via unanimous decision.

== Championships and accomplishments ==
=== Mixed martial arts ===
- Absolute Championship Akhmat
  - ACA Middleweight Championship (One time)
  - 2015 ACB Middleweight Grand Prix

== Personal life ==
Anatoly married at the age of 19 to Maria, who are still together to this day and raise 2 daughters, Liza and Snezhana. Despite the fact that the athlete spends a lot of time at training camps in Stary Oskol and other cities of Russia, he connects his future exclusively with Tobolsk. He has a younger brother, Vladimir Tokov, who is also a mixed martial artist.

Has a higher education, graduating from the Tobolsk Pedagogical Institute of Tyumen University.

== Mixed martial arts record ==
Professional record breakdown
36 matches	32 wins	4 losses
By knockout	17	1
By submission	7	0
By decision	8	3

Res.	Record	Opponent	Method	Event	Date	Round	Time	Location	Notes
Loss	32–4	Alexander Shlemenko	Decision (split)	RCC 21	December 14, 2024	3	5:00	Yekaterinburg, Russia	
Win	32–3	Sharaf Davlatmurodov	Decision (unanimous)	ACA 174	April 19, 2024	3	5:00	Saint Petersburg, Russia	
Loss	31–3	Johnny Eblen	Decision (unanimous)	Bellator 290	February 4, 2023	5	5:00	Inglewood, California, United States	For the Bellator Middleweight World Championship.
Win	31–2	Muhammad Abdullah	TKO (punches)	Bellator 282	June 24, 2022	1	2:28	Uncasville, Connecticut, United States	
Win	30–2	Sharaf Davlatmurodov	Decision (split)	Bellator 269	October 23, 2021	3	5:00	Moscow, Russia	
Win	29–2	Hracho Darpinyan	TKO (elbows)	Bellator 229	October 4, 2019	2	4:38	Temecula, California, United States	
Win	28–2	Gerald Harris	Submission (guillotine choke)	Bellator 218	March 22, 2019	2	0:37	Thackerville, Oklahoma, United States	
Win	27–2	Alexander Shlemenko	Decision (unanimous)	Bellator 208	October 13, 2018	3	5:00	Uniondale, New York, United States	
Win	26–2	Vladimir Filipovic	Technical Submission (guillotine choke)	Bellator 200	May 25, 2018	1	0:56	London, England	
Win	25–2	Francisco France	TKO (punches)	Bellator 172	February 18, 2017	2	2:24	San Jose, California, United States	
Loss	24–2	Ramazan Emeev	Decision (majority)	M-1 Challenge 73	December 9, 2016	3	5:00	Nazran, Russia	For the M-1 Global Middleweight Championship.
Win	24–1	Vladimir Filipovic	Decision (unanimous)	Fight Nights Global 50	June 17, 2016	3	5:00	Saint Petersburg, Russia	Catchweight (190 lb) bout.
Win	23–1	Arbi Aguev	TKO (punches)	ACB 38	May 20, 2016	4	4:19	Rostov-on-Don, Russia	Won the 2015 ACB Middleweight Grand Prix and the inaugural ACB Middleweight Championship.
Win	22–1	A.J. Matthews	KO (punch)	Rizin World Grand Prix 2015: Part 1 - Saraba	December 29, 2015	1	0:55	Saitama, Japan	
Win	21–1	Adam Zajac	TKO (punches)	ACB 19	May 30, 2015	1	2:00	Kaliningrad, Russia	2015 ACB Middleweight Grand Prix Semifinal.
Win	20–1	Sergiu Breb	KO (punch)	Steel Battle 2	April 24, 2015	1	4:07	Stary Oskol, Russia	
Win	19–1	Maxim Shvets	Submission (guillotine choke)	ACB 15	March 21, 2015	2	2:31	Nalchik, Russia	2015 ACB Middleweight Grand Prix Quarterfinal.
Win	18–1	Enoc Solves Torres	TKO (punches)	M-1 Challenge 54	December 17, 2014	3	0:53	Saint Petersburg, Russia	
Win	17–1	Jordan Smith	Decision (unanimous)	Plotforma S-70	August 9, 2014	3	5:00	Sochi, Russia	
Win	16-1	Vadim Feger	KO (punch)	SOMMAF: Steel Battle 1	July 16, 2014	1	0:12	Stary Oskol, Russia	
Win	15–1	Albert Duraev	KO (punches)	M-1 Challenge 46	March 14, 2014	1	3:21	Saint Petersburg, Russia	
Win	14–1	Reinaldo da Silva	Decision (unanimous)	TFN: Western Siberian Cup	February 1, 2014	2	5:00	Tyumen, Russia	Heavyweight bout.
Win	13–1	Islam Yashaev	Submission (guillotine choke)	Voronezh MMA Federation: Fight Riot 2	October 12, 2013	2	2:14	Voronezh, Russia	
Win	12–1	Adam Polgar	TKO (retirement)	ANMMA: Liberation	August 5, 2013	3	2:00	Belgorod, Russia	
Win	11–1	Magomed Ismailov	Submission (kimura)	M-1 Challenge 39	May 23, 2013	1	2:48	Moscow, Russia	
Win	10–1	Yuri Shurov	Decision (unanimous)	M-1 Challenge: Grand Finale	December 16, 2012	4	5:00	Moscow, Russia	
Win	9–1	Rustam Gadzhiev	Submission (choke)	M-1 Fighter 2012 Semifinals	April 29, 2012	3	N/A	Moscow, Russia	
Win	8–1	Pavel Pokatilov	Decision	M-1 Fighter 2012 Quarterfinals	April 22, 2012	2	3:00	Moscow, Russia	
Loss	7–1	Magomed Magomedkerimov	KO (punch)	League S-70: First Round	December 22, 2011	1	1:07	Volgograd, Russia	Return to Middleweight.
Win	7–0	Artur Korchemny	KO (punch)	TFN: Siberia vs Urals	December 16, 2011	1	N/A	Tyumen, Russia	Light Heavyweight bout.
Win	6–0	Jan Zdansky	TKO (punches)	M-1 Challenge 28	November 12, 2011	1	4:20	Astrakhan, Russia	
Win	5–0	Arsen Magomedov	TKO (punches)	Corona Cup 2	October 14, 2011	1	3:14	Moscow, Russia	
Win	4–0	Zurab Kurabanov	KO (punches)	Pankration Cup Of Call 2011	February 12, 2011	2	1:44	Omsk, Russia	Light Heavyweight bout.
Win	3–0	Rustam Abdurapov	Submission (armbar)	L-1: Marshal Govorov Memorial 2010	December 25, 2010	2	0:40	Saint Petersburg, Russia	Middleweight bout.
Win	2–0	Alexey Katukov	KO (punch)	Russian Cities Cup 2010	November 18, 2010	2	N/A	Lipetsk, Russia	Heavyweight debut.
Win	1–0	Anatoly Vintovkin	TKO (punches)	M-1 Challenge: 2009 Selections 9	November 3, 2009	2	0:59	Saint Petersburg, Russia	Middleweight debut.

== See also ==
- List of male mixed martial artists
