= List of Fight Nights Global events =

This is a list of events held and scheduled by Fight Nights Global (also known as "Fight Nights"), a mixed martial arts organization based in the Russia. Upcoming fights are italicized.

== List of events ==
No.	Event	Date	Venue	Location
106	AMC Fight Nights Global 99	December 25, 2020	Basket Hall	Moscow, Russia
105	AMC Fight Nights Global: Winter Cup	December 24, 2020	Basket Hall	Moscow, Russia
104	Fight Nights Global 98: Amirov vs Bikrev	September 25, 2020		Moscow, Russia
103	Fight Nights Global 97	September 19, 2020		Elista, Russia
102	Fight Nights Global & GFC: Abdulmanap Nurmagomedov Memory Tournament	September 9, 2020	Irina Viner-Usmanova Gymnastics Palace	Moscow, Russia
101	MMA Festival: 75th Anniversary of the Great Victory	August 28, 2020	KSK Express	Rostov on Don, Russia
100	Festival Stepping into Immortality	March 1, 2020	DIVS	Ekaterinburg, Russia
99	Fight Nights Global 96	December 28, 2019	Adrenaline Stadium	Moscow, Russia
98	Fight Nights Global 95	October 19, 2019		Sochi, Russia
97	Fight Nights Global 94	October 12, 2019	Luzhniki Palace of Sports	Moscow, Russia
96	Fight Nights Global 93: Mytyshchi Cup	April 26, 2019	Mytishchi Arena	Mytishchi, Russia
95	Fight Nights Global 92: Bagautinov vs. Asatryan	April 6, 2019	Luzhniki Palace of Sports	Moscow, Russia
94	Fight Nights Global 91	December 27, 2018	Cition Hall	Moscow, Russia
93	Fight Nights Global 90: Mineev vs. Ismailov	October 19, 2018	VTB Ice Palace	Moscow, Russia
92	Fight Nights Global 89	September 8, 2018		Bozhou, China
91	Fight Nights Global 88	August 31, 2018	Alau Arena	Astana, Kazakhstan
90	Fight Nights Global: Summer Cup 2018	June 30, 2018		Bozhou, China
89	Fight Nights Global 87: Khachatryan vs. Queally	May 19, 2018	KSK Express	Rostov-on-Don, Russia
88	Fight Nights Global 86: Nam vs. Zhumagulov	April 1, 2018	Almaty Arena	Almaty, Kazakhstan
87	Fight Nights Global 85: Alikhanov vs. Kopylov	March 30, 2018	VTB Ice Palace	Moscow, Russia
86	Fight Nights Global 84: Deák vs. Chupanov	March 2, 2018	Hant Arena	Bratislava, Slovakia
85	Fight Nights Global 83: Alibekov vs. Aliev	February 22, 2018	Luzhniki Palace of Sports	Moscow, Russia
84	Fight Nights Global 82: Minakov vs. Johnson	December 16, 2017	Luzhniki Palace of Sports	Moscow, Russia
83	Fight Nights Global 81: Matmuratov vs. Ignatiev	December 15, 2017	Arena Omsk	Omsk, Russia
82	Fight Nights Global 80: Khamitov vs. Queally	November 26, 2017	Almaty Arena	Almaty, Kazakhstan
81	Fight Nights Global 79: Pavlovich vs. Sidelnikov	November 19, 2017	Diesel Arena	Penza, Russia
80	Fight Nights Global 78: Tsarev vs. Guseinov	November 4, 2017	Lada Arena	Tolyatti, Russia
79	Fight Nights Global 77: Krylov vs. Newton	October 13, 2017	SOK Energetik	Surgut, Russia
78	Fight Nights Global 76: Bagautinov vs. Martinez	October 8, 2017	Olympus Arena	Krasnodar, Russia
77	Fight Nights Global 75: Deák vs. Chistyakov	October 6, 2017	Yubileyny Sports Palace	Saint Petersburg, Russia
76	Fight Nights Global 74: Aleksakhin vs. Graves	September 29, 2017	Luzhniki Palace of Sports	Moscow, Russia
75	Fight Nights Global 73: Aliev vs. Brandão	September 4, 2017	Ali Aliyev Sports Palace	Kaspiysk, Russia
74	Fight Nights Global 72: Hill vs. Engibaryan	August 24, 2017	Ice Cube	Sochi, Russia
73	Fight Nights Global 71: Mineev vs. Michailidis	July 29, 2017	Luzhniki Palace of Sports	Moscow, Russia
72	Fight Nights Global 70: Palhares vs. Ivanov	July 7, 2017	FSK Sports Complex	Ulan-Ude, Russia
71	Fight Nights Global 69: Bagautinov vs. Nobre	June 30, 2017	Ice Sports Palace Sibir	Novosibirsk, Russia
70	Fight Nights Global 68: Pavlovich vs. Mokhnatkin	June 2, 2017	Yubileyny Sports Palace	Saint Petersburg, Russia
69	Fight Nights Global 67: Brandão vs. Galiev	May 25, 2017	DIVS Arena	Ekaterinburg, Russia
68	Fight Nights Global 66: Alikhanov vs. Murtazaliev	May 21, 2017	Ali Aliyev Sports Palace	Kaspiysk, Russia
67	Fight Nights Global 65: Asatryan vs. Zhumagalov	May 19, 2017	Barys Arena	Astana, Kazakhstan
66	Fight Nights Global 64: Nam vs. Bagautinov	April 27, 2017	VTB Arena	Moscow, Russia
65	Fight Nights Global 63: Alibekov vs. Khamitov	April 21, 2017	Fetisov Arena	Vladivostok, Russia
64	Fight Nights Global 62: Matmuratov vs.Kurzanov	March 31, 2017	Krylatskoye Sports Palace	Moscow, Russia
63	Fight Nights Global 61: Aleksakhin vs. Enomoto	March 11, 2017	Bryansk Ice Palace	Bryansk, Russia
62	Fight Nights Global 60: Aryshev vs. Khasanov	March 4, 2017	Tax Committee Sports Center	Dushanbe, Tajikistan
61	Fight Nights Global 59: Minakov vs. Linderman	February 23, 2017	Innovator Sports Palace	Khimki, Russia
60	Fight Nights Global 58: Brandão vs. Machaev	January 28, 2017	Ali Aliyev Sports Palace	Kaspiysk, Russia
59	Fight Nights Global 57: Sidelnikov vs. Agaev	December 16, 2016	Krylatskoye Sports Palace	Moscow, Russia
58	Fight Nights Global 56: Falcão vs. Mineev	December 9, 2016	Fetisov Arena	Vladivostok, Russia
57	Fight Nights Global 55: McGann vs. Egorov	November 22, 2016	Crocus City Hall	Moscow, Russia
56	Fight Nights Global 54: Pavlovich vs. Kudin	November 16, 2016	KSK Express	Rostov-on-Don, Russia
55	Fight Nights Global 53: Day 2 - Mineev vs. Enomoto	October 8, 2016	Luzhniki Palace of Sports	Moscow, Russia
54	Fight Nights Global 53: Day 1 - Gimbatov vs. Shokalo	October 7, 2016	Luzhniki Palace of Sports	Moscow, Russia
53	Fight Nights Global 52: Mokhnatkin vs. Maldonado	October 1, 2016	Yubileyny Sports Palace	Nizhnevartovsk, Russia
52	Fight Nights Global 51: Pavlovich vs. Gelegaev	September 25, 2016	Ali Aliev Sports Palace	Kaspiysk, Russia
51	Fight Nights Global Global Summer Cup 2016	August 27, 2016	Black Sea Arena	(Georgia (country)) Ureki, Georgia
50	Fight Nights Global 50: Fedor vs. Maldonado	June 17, 2016	Sibur Arena	Saint Petersburg, Russia
49	Fight Nights Global 49: Stoyan vs. Škondrič	June 4, 2016	Banská Bystrica Ice Stadium	Banská Bystrica, Slovakia
48	Fight Nights Global 48: Enomoto vs. Molodtsov	May 26, 2016	Luzhniki Palace of Sports	Moscow, Russia
47	Fight Nights Global 47: Tyurin vs. Magal	May 15, 2016	A2 Arena	Saint Petersburg, Russia
46	Fight Nights Global 46: Mokhnatkin vs. Kudin	April 29, 2016	Ice Palace Krylatskoye	Moscow, Russia
45	Fight Nights Global 45: Galiev vs. Stepanyan	April 22, 2016	Ufa Arena	Ufa, Russia
44	Fight Nights Global 44: Machaev vs. Sarnavskiy	February 26, 2016	Luzhniki Palace of Sports	Moscow, Russia
43	Fight Nights: Battle Of Moscow 20	December 11, 2015	Luzhniki Palace of Sports	Moscow, Russia
42	Fight Nights: Petersburg	October 23, 2015	Ice Palace	Saint Petersburg, Russia
41	Fight Nights: Dagestan	September 25, 2015	Ali Aliyev Sports Complex	Kaspiysk, Russia
40	Fight Nights: Sochi	July 31, 2015	Shayba Arena	Sochi, Russia
39	Fight Nights: Battle on Volga 2	June 22, 2015	Circus Arena	Kostroma, Russia
38	Fight Nights: Battle Of Moscow 19	June 11, 2015	Luzhniki Palace of Sports	Moscow, Russia
37	Fight Nights: Fight Club 7	May 16, 2015	Fight Nights Gym	Moscow, Russia
36	Fight Nights: Fight Club 6	April 9, 2015	Fight Nights Gym	Moscow, Russia
35	Fight Nights: Fight Club 5	April 2, 2015	Fight Nights Gym	Moscow, Russia
34	Fight Nights: Fight Club 4	March 26, 2015	Fight Nights Gym	Moscow, Russia
33	Fight Nights: Cup of Moscow	March 22, 2015	Khimki Basketball	Khimki, Russia
32	Fight Nights: Fight Club 3	March 19, 2015	Fight Nights Gym	Moscow, Russia
31	Fight Nights: Fight Club 2	March 12, 2015	Fight Nights Gym	Moscow, Russia
30	Fight Nights: Fight Club 1	March 5, 2015	Fight Nights Gym	Moscow, Russia
29	Fight Nights: Battle Of Moscow 18	December 20, 2014	Luzhniki Palace of Sports	Moscow, Russia
28	Fight Nights: Fight Club	December 2, 2014	Fight Nights Gym	Moscow, Russia
27	Fight Nights: Battle Of Moscow 17	September 30, 2014	Luzhniki Palace of Sports	Moscow, Russia
26	Fight Nights: Battle Of Moscow 16	July 11, 2014	Luzhniki Palace of Sports	Moscow, Russia
25	Fight Nights: Battle on Volga 1	June 27, 2014	Circus Arena	Kostroma, Russia
24	Fight Nights: Battle Of Moscow 15	March 28, 2014	Luzhniki Palace of Sports	Moscow, Russia
23	Krepost Selection 3	February 15, 2014	Krylia Sovetov Sports Hall	Moscow, Russia
22	Fight Nights: Battle Of Moscow 14	December 7, 2013	Luzhniki Palace of Sports	Moscow, Russia
21	Fight Nights: Battle on Nyamiha	November 29, 2013	Minsk-Arena	Minsk, Belarus
20	Fight Nights: Battle Of Moscow 13	October 26, 2013	Luzhniki Palace of Sports	Moscow, Russia
19	Fight Nights: Krepost Selection 2	October 11, 2013	Korston Arena	Moscow, Russia
18	Fight Nights: Battle on Terek	October 4, 2013	Olimpiyski Sport Complex	Grozny, Russia
17	Fight Nights: Krepost Selection 1	September 20, 2013	Korston Arena	Moscow, Russia
16	Fight Nights: Battle Of Moscow 12	June 20, 2013	Luzhniki Palace of Sports	Moscow, Russia
15	Fight Nights: Battle Of Moscow 11	April 20, 2013	Luzhniki Palace of Sports	Moscow, Russia
14	Fight Nights: Battle Of Moscow 10	February 23, 2013	Luzhniki Palace of Sports	Moscow, Russia
13	Fight Nights: Battle of Moscow 9	December 16, 2012	Dynamo Sports Palace	Moscow, Russia
12	Fight Nights: Battle of Moscow 8	November 3, 2012	Sokolniki Arena	Moscow, Russia
11	Fight Nights: Battle of Desne	September 17, 2012	Bryansk Ice Palace	Bryansk, Russia
10	Fight Nights: Battle of the Kama	June 20, 2012	Universal Sports Palace Molot	Perm, Russia
9	Fight Nights: Battle Of Moscow 7	June 7, 2012	Crocus City Hall	Moscow, Russia
8	Fight Nights: Battle in Kalmykia	May 4, 2012	Uralan Stadium	Elista, Russia
7	Fight Nights: Battle Of Moscow 6	March 8, 2012	Crocus City Hall	Moscow, Russia
6	Fight Nights: Battle Of Moscow 5	November 5, 2011	Dynamo Sports Palace	Moscow, Russia
5	Fight Nights: The Fights With and Without Rules	September 21, 2011	Korston Hotel	Moscow, Russia
4	Fight Nights: Battle Of Moscow 4	July 7, 2011	Crocus City Hall	Moscow, Russia
3	Fight Nights: Battle Of Moscow 3	March 12, 2011	Crocus City Hall	Moscow, Russia
2	Fight Nights: Battle of Moscow 2	October 15, 2010	Crocus City Hall	Moscow, Russia
1	Fight Nights: Battle of Moscow 1	June 5, 2010	Crocus City Hall	Moscow, Russia
