= 2011 in Fight Nights Global =

Information
- First date: March 12, 2011
- Last date: November 5, 2011

Events
- Total events: 4

Fights

Chronology
2010 in Fight Nights Global	2011 in Fight Nights Global	2012 in Fight Nights Global

The year 2011 was the second year in the history of the Fight Nights Global, a mixed martial arts and kickboxing promotion based in Russia. It started broadcasting through a television agreement with REN TV.

== List of events ==
#	Event Title	Date	Arena	Location
1	Fight Nights: Battle of Moscow 3	March 12, 2011	Crocus City Hall	Moscow, Russia
2	Fight Nights: Battle of Moscow 4	July 7, 2011	Crocus City Hall	Moscow, Russia
3	Fight Nights: The Fights With and Without Rules	September 21, 2011	Korston Hotel	Moscow, Russia
4	Fight Nights: Battle of Moscow 5	November 5, 2011	Dynamo Sports Palace	Moscow, Russia

== Fight Nights: Battle of Moscow 3 ==
Fight Nights: Battle of Moscow 3
- Promotion: Fight Nights Global
- Date: March 12, 2011
- Venue: Crocus City Hall
- City: Moscow, Russia

Event chronology
Fight Nights: Battle of Moscow 2	Fight Nights: Battle of Moscow 3	Fight Nights: Battle of Moscow 4

Fight Nights: Battle of Moscow 3 was a mixed martial arts and kickboxing event held by Fight Nights Global on March 12, 2011 at the Crocus City Hall in Moscow, Russia.

=== Result ===
Fight Card
Weight Class				Method	Round	Time	Notes
Kickboxing 72.5 kg	(Russia) Batu Khasikov	def.	(Netherlands) Albert Kraus	Decision (Unanimous)	3	3:00	
Kickboxing 91 kg	(Russia) Vladimir Mineev	def.	(Morocco) Narjiss Abdeslam	TKO (3 Knockdown)	2		
MMA Lightweight 70 kg	(Russia) Rasul Mirzaev	def.	(Ukraine) Evgeni Khavilov	KO (Punch)	1	1:02	
MMA Flyweight 57 kg	(Russia) Vitaliy Panteleev	def.	(Russia) Ali Bagautinov	Decision (Unanimous)	3	5:00	
MMA Welterweight 77 kg	(Russia) Vasiliy Tzarkov	def.	(Russia) Akhmed Musaev	Submission (Rear-Naked Choke)	1	4:30	

== Fight Nights: Battle of Moscow 4 ==
Fight Nights: Battle of Moscow 4
- Promotion: Fight Nights Global
- Date: July 7, 2011
- Venue: Crocus City Hall
- City: Moscow, Russia

Event chronology
Fight Nights: Battle Of Moscow 3	Fight Nights: Battle of Moscow 4	Fight Nights: The Fights With and Without Rules

Fight Nights: Battle Of Moscow 4 was a mixed martial arts and kickboxing event held by Fight Nights Global on July 7, 2011 at the Crocus City Hall in Moscow, Russia.

=== Result ===
Fight Card
Weight Class				Method	Round	Time	Notes
MMA Featherweight 66 kg	(Russia) Rasul Mirzaev	def.	(Japan) Masanori Kanehara	TKO (Punches)	1	1:47	
MMA Welterweight 77 kg	(Russia) Shamil Zavurov	def.	(Kyrgyzstan) Janybek Amatov	TKO (Leg Injury)	2	1:34	
Kickboxing 65 kg	(Ukraine) Roman Mailov	def.	(Russia) Andrey Lemmer	TKO (Elbow)	2		Tournament Final
MMA Heavyweight 120 kg	(Russia) Ruslan Magomedov	def.	(Russia) Vitalii Yalovenko	Decision (Unanimous)	2	5:00	
MMA Light Heavyweight 93 kg	(Russia) Gasan Umalatov	def.	(Russia) Stanislav Molodtsov	Decision (Unanimous)	2	5:00	
MMA Welterweight 77 kg	(Russia) Bagautdin Abasov	def.	(Russia) Ivan Kosov	Decision (Unanimous)	2	5:00	
Kickboxing 65 kg	(Russia) Andrey Lemmer	def.	(Brazil) Wagner Pinheiro	Decision (Unanimous)	3	3:00	Tournament Semi-Finals
Kickboxing 65 kg	(Ukraine) Roman Mailov	def.	(Slovenia) Martin Sili	Decision (Unanimous)	3	3:00	Tournament Semi-Finals

=== Kickboxing 65 kg Tournament bracket ===
Semi-finals
(Russia) Andrey Lemmer	TKO
(Brazil) Wagner Pinheiro	2r.
(Ukraine) Roman Mailov	DEC
(Slovenia) Martin Sili	3r.

Final
(Ukraine) Roman Mailov	KO
(Russia) Andrey Lemmer	2r.

== Fight Nights: The Fights With and Without Rules ==
Fight Nights: The Fights With and Without Rules
- Promotion: Fight Nights Global
- Date: September 21, 2011
- Venue: Korston Hotel
- City: Moscow, Russia

Event chronology
Fight Nights: Battle Of Moscow 4	Fight Nights: The Fights With and Without Rules	Fight Nights: Battle Of Moscow 5

Fight Nights: The Fights With and Without Rules was a mixed martial arts and kickboxing event held by Fight Nights Global on September 21, 2011 at the Korston Hotel in Moscow, Russia.

=== Result ===
Fight Card
Weight Class				Method	Round	Time	Notes
MMA Flyweight 57 kg	(Russia) Ali Bagautinov	def.	(Russia) Asan Aysabekov	TKO (Punches)	1	2:06	
MMA Heavyweight 120 kg	(Russia) Omari Broi	def.	(Russia) Eladi Adgiev	Decision (Split)	3	3:00	
MMA Lightweight 70 kg	(Russia) Anatoliy Pokrovsky	def.	(Russia) Islam Kiloev	Submission (Armbar)	2	2:30	
MMA Light Heavyweight 93 kg	(Russia) Hachatur Kazaryan	def.	(Russia) Vitalii Yalovenko	Decision (Split)	2	5:00	
MMA Welterweight 77 kg	(Russia) Andrey Markovich	def.	(Russia) Stanislav Molodtsov	Submission (Armbar)	1	4:30	
MMA Bantamweight 61 kg	(Russia) Hamzat Bukiev	def.	(Russia) Nail Mamleev	TKO (Punches)	2	2:10	
MMA Welterweight 77 kg	(Russia) Marif Piraev	def.	(Russia) Ivan Fomin	Submission (Rear-Naked Choke)	2	2:34	

== Fight Nights: Battle of Moscow 5 ==
Fight Nights: Battle of Moscow 5
- Promotion: Fight Nights Global
- Date: November 5, 2011
- Venue: Dynamo Sports Palace
- City: Moscow, Russia

Event chronology
Fight Nights: The Fights With and Without Rules	Fight Nights: Battle of Moscow 5	Fight Nights: Battle of Moscow 6

Fight Nights: Battle Of Moscow 5 was a mixed martial arts and kickboxing event held by Fight Nights Global on November 5, 2011 at the Dynamo Sports Palace in Moscow, Russia.

=== Result ===
Fight Card
Weight Class				Method	Round	Time	Notes
Kickboxing 72 kg	(Russia) Batu Khasikov	def.	(Greece) Mike Zambidis	TKO (Punches)	1	1:40	
MMA Lightweight 70 kg	(Russia) Vener Galiev	def.	(Kyrgyzstan) Tursunbek Asylgaziev	TKO (Punches)	2		
MMA Flyweight 57 kg	(Russia) Ali Bagautinov	def.	(Russia) Vitaliy Panteleev	TKO (Punches)	1	4:07	
MMA Middleweight 84 kg	(Russia) Stanislav Molodcov	def.	(Brazil) Charles Andrade	Decision (Unanimous)	2	5:00	
MMA Welterweight 77 kg	(Russia) Bagautdin Abasov	def.	(Russia) Anton Fedorov	Decision (Unanimous)	2	5:00	
Kickboxing 72 kg	(Russia) Vladimir Voytekhovskiy	def.	(Belarus) Pavel Dikiy	TKO (3 Knockdown)	4	2:33	
MMA Women's Flyweight 57 kg	(Russia) Julia Berezikova	def.	(Russia) Eugenia Kostina	Decision (Unanimous)	2	3:00	
MMA Bantamweight 61 kg	(Russia) Satrutdin Shamilov	def.	(Russia) Im Veng	Decision (Unanimous)	2	3:00	
