= 2012 in Fight Nights Global =

Information
- First date: March 8, 2012
- Last date: December 16, 2012

Events
- Total events: 7

Fights

Chronology
| 2011 in Fight Nights Global | 2012 in Fight Nights Global |

The year 2012 was the third year in the history of the Fight Nights Global, a mixed martial arts and kickboxing promotion based in Russia. It started broadcasting through a television agreement with REN TV.

== List of events ==
| # | Event title | Date | Arena | Location |
|---|---|---|---|---|
| 1 | Fight Nights: Battle Of Moscow 6 | March 8, 2012 | Crocus City Hall | Moscow, Russia |
| 2 | Fight Nights: Battle in Kalmykia | May 4, 2012 | Uralan Stadium | Elista, Russia |
| 3 | Fight Nights: Battle Of Moscow 7 | June 7, 2012 | Crocus City Hall | Moscow, Russia |
| 4 | Fight Nights: Battle of the Kama | June 20, 2012 | Universal Sports Palace Molot | Perm, Russia |
| 5 | Fight Nights: Battle of Desne | September 17, 2012 | Bryansk Ice Palace | Bryansk, Russia |
| 6 | Fight Nights: Battle Of Moscow 8 | November 3, 2012 | Sokolniki Arena | Moscow, Russia |
| 7 | Fight Nights: Battle Of Moscow 9 | December 16, 2012 | Dynamo Sports Palace | Moscow, Russia |

== Fight Nights: Battle Of Moscow 6 ==
Fight Nights: Battle Of Moscow 6
- Promotion: Fight Nights Global
- Date: March 8, 2012
- Venue: Crocus City Hall
- City: Moscow, Russia

Event chronology
| Fight Nights: Battle Of Moscow 5 | Fight Nights: Battle Of Moscow 6 | Fight Nights: Battle in Kalmykia |

Fight Nights: Battle Of Moscow 6 was a mixed martial arts and kickboxing event held by Fight Nights Global on March 8, 2012 at the Crocus City Hall in Moscow, Russia.

=== Result ===
Fight Card
| Weight Class | | | | Method | Round | Time | Notes |
|---|---|---|---|---|---|---|---|
| Kickboxing 91 kg | (Russia) Vladimir Mineev | def. | (France) David Radeff | TKO (Referee Stoppage) | 3 | 2:48 | |
| MMA Welterweight 77 kg | (Russia) Shamkhal Kerimov | def. | (Croatia) Matej Truhan | TKO (Doctor Stoppage) | 2 | 1:30 | |
| Kickboxing 81 kg | (Belarus) Denis Varaska | def. | (Thailand) Samkor Keatmonthep | Decision (Unanimous) | 3 | 3:00 | |
| MMA Flyweight 57 kg | (Russia) Ali Bagautinov | def. | (Kyrgyzstan) Zharkyn Baizakov | Decision (Unanimous) | 2 | 5:00 | |
| Kickboxing 71 kg | (Russia) Dzhabar Askerov | def. | (France) Jeremy Sportouch | Decision (Unanimous) | 3 | 3:00 | |
| Kickboxing 91 kg | (Russia) Max Dukhanov | def. | (Russia) Ivan Traore | Decision (Unanimous) | 3 | 3:00 | Celebrity Fight |
| Kickboxing 91 kg | (Belgium) Mamadou Keta | def. | (Russia) Ramazan Ramazanov | Ko (Head Kick) | 2 | 0:29 | |
| MMA Welterweight 77 kg | (Russia) Murad Magomedov | def. | (Russia) Stanislav Molodcov | Submission (Armbar) | 2 | 3:15 | |
| MMA Middleweight 84 kg | (Russia) Ismail Aliev | def. | (Russia) Injin Van | Submission (Armbar) | 1 | 1:50 | |
| MMA Women's Flyweight 57 kg | (Russia) Julia Berezikova | def. | (Russia) Alena Hola | Submission (Armbar) | 2 | 1:35 | |

== Fight Nights: Battle in Kalmykia ==
Fight Nights: Battle in Kalmykia
- Promotion: Fight Nights Global
- Date: May 4, 2012
- Venue: Uralan Stadium
- City: Elista, Russia

Event chronology
| Fight Nights: Battle Of Moscow 6 | Fight Nights: Battle in Kalmykia | Fight Nights: Battle Of Moscow 7 |

Fight Nights: Battle in Kalmykia was a mixed martial arts and kickboxing event held by Fight Nights Global on May 4, 2012 at the Uralan Stadium in Elista, Russia.

=== Result ===
Fight Card
| Weight Class | | | | Method | Round | Time | Notes |
|---|---|---|---|---|---|---|---|
| Kickboxing 72 kg | (Russia) Batu Khasikov | def. | (South Africa) Warren Stevelmans | Decision (Split) | 3 | 3:00 | |
| MMA Flyweight 57 kg | (Russia) Ali Bagautinov | def. | (Ukraine) Vitaly Maksimov | Submission (Rear-Naked Choke) | 1 | 2:50 | |
| MMA Welterweight 77 kg | (Russia) Imanali Gamzathanov | def. | (Russia) Dmitry Korobeynikov | Decision (Unanimous) | 2 | 5:00 | |
| MMA Light Heavyweight 93 kg | (Russia) Mikhail Sysoev | def. | (Kyrgyzstan) Vasil Feyzrakhmanov | Decision (Unanimous) | 2 | 5:00 | |
| MMA Welterweight 77 kg | (Russia) Vladimir Egoyan | def. | (Russia) Sukhrab Murtazaliev | Submission (Rear-Naked Choke) | 1 | 1:21 | |
| MMA Welterweight 77 kg | (Russia) Magomed Magomedov | def. | (Ukraine) Alexei Maksimchuk | Decision (Unanimous) | 2 | 5:00 | |
| MMA Welterweight 77 kg | (Ukraine) Artur Karapetyan | def. | (Russia) Ivan Valetov | Decision (Unanimous) | 2 | 5:00 | |

== Fight Nights: Battle Of Moscow 7 ==
Fight Nights: Battle Of Moscow 7
- Promotion: Fight Nights Global
- Date: June 7, 2012
- Venue: Crocus City Hall
- City: Moscow, Russia

Event chronology
| Fight Nights: Battle in Kalmykia | Fight Nights: Battle Of Moscow 7 | Fight Nights: Battle of the Kama |

Fight Nights: Battle Of Moscow 7 was a mixed martial arts and kickboxing event held by Fight Nights Global on June 7, 2012 at the Crocus City Hall in Moscow, Russia.

=== Result ===
Fight Card
| Weight Class | | | | Method | Round | Time | Notes |
|---|---|---|---|---|---|---|---|
| MMA Heavyweight 120 kg | (Russia) Vitaly Minakov | def. | (United States) Eddie Sanchez | KO (Punch) | 1 | 1:59 | |
| MMA Flyweight 57 kg | (Russia) Ali Bagautinov | def. | (Finland) Mikael Silander | Decision (Unanimous) | 2 | 5:00 | |
| Kickboxing 91 kg | (Russia) Ramazan Ramazanov | def. | (Belgium) Mamadou Keta | Decision (Unanimous) | 3 | 3:00 | |
| Kickboxing 71 kg | (Russia) Dzhabar Askerov | def. | (Russia) Danila Utenkov | TKO (Referee Stoppage) | 2 | 2:54 | |
| Muaythai 81 kg | (Russia) Alexander Lipovoy | def. | (Poland) Filip Kulawinski | Decision (Unanimous) | 6 | 2:00 | |
| MMA Lightweight 70 kg | (Russia) Sergey Rodnov | def. | (Russia) Ramazan Kurbanismailov | Decision (Split) | 2 | 5:00 | |
| MMA Welterweight 77 kg | (Russia) Arsen Aliev | def. | (Belarus) Mikhail Busurmatorov | TKO (Punches) | 1 | 2:12 | |
| MMA Middleweight 84 kg | (Russia) Magomed Magomedov | def. | (Russia) Sergey Klassen | Submission (Triangle Choke) | 1 | 2:19 | |

== Fight Nights: Battle of the Kama ==
Fight Nights: Battle of the Kama
- Promotion: Fight Nights Global
- Date: June 20, 2012
- Venue: Universal Sports Palace Molot
- City: Perm, Russia

Event chronology
| Fight Nights: Battle Of Moscow 7 | Fight Nights: Battle of the Kama | Fight Nights: Battle Of Desne |

Fight Nights: Battle of the Kama was a mixed martial arts and kickboxing event held by Fight Nights Global on June 20, 2012 at the Universal Sports Palace Molot in Perm, Russia.

=== Result ===
Fight Card
| Weight Class | | | | Method | Round | Time | Notes |
|---|---|---|---|---|---|---|---|
| Kickboxing 91 kg | (Russia) Vladimir Mineev | def. | (Poland) Tomasz Sarara | Decision (Unanimous) | 3 | 3:00 | |
| Kickboxing 71 kg | (Russia) Maxim Smirnov | def. | (Italy) Julian Imeri | Decision (Unanimous) | 3 | 3:00 | |
| MMA Lighteight 70 kg | (Russia) Abdula Dadaev | def. | (Russia) Ivan Lapin | Submission (Guillotine Choke) | 1 | 3:32 | |
| MMA Welterweight 77 kg | (Russia) Imanali Gamzathanov | def. | (Russia) Artur Zaynullin | Decision (Unanimous) | 2 | 5:00 | |
| Kickboxing 71 kg | (Russia) Sergei Elshin | def. | (Brazil) Wagner Pinheiro | Decision (Unanimous) | 3 | 3:00 | |
| Kickboxing 80 kg | (Russia) Anatoly Lavrov | def. | (Russia) Yuri Antonov | Decision (Unanimous) | 3 | 3:00 | |

== Fight Nights: Battle Of Desne ==
Fight Nights: Battle Of Desne
- Promotion: Fight Nights Global
- Date: September 17, 2012
- Venue: Bryansk Ice Palace
- City: Bryansk, Russia

Event chronology
| Fight Nights: Battle of the Kama | Fight Nights: Battle Of Desne | Fight Nights: Battle Of Moscow 8 |

Fight Nights: Battle Of Desne was a mixed martial arts and kickboxing event held by Fight Nights Global on September 17, 2012 at the Bryansk Ice Palace in Bryansk, Russia.

=== Result ===
Fight Card
| Weight Class | | | | Method | Round | Time | Notes |
|---|---|---|---|---|---|---|---|
| MMA Heavyweight 120 kg | (Russia) Vitaly Minakov | def. | (Brazil) Fabiano Scherner | TKO (Punches) | 1 | 3:51 | |
| MMA Flyweight 57 kg | (Russia) Ali Bagautinov | def. | (Belarus) Vadim Zhlobich | Submission (Guillotine Choke) | 2 | 1:01 | |
| MMA Welterweight 77 kg | (Russia) Nikolay Aleksakhin | def. | (Belarus) Ilya Martisyuk | TKO (Punches) | 1 | 2:18 | |
| MMA Welterweight 77 kg | (United States) Tarrance Williams | def. | (Russia) Ivan Kosov | TKO (Punches) | 1 | 3:18 | |
| MMA Welterweight 70 kg | (Russia) Dmitry Silnyagin | def. | (Russia) Daniyal Aselderov | Decision (Unanimous) | 3 | 5:00 | |
| MMA Welterweight 77 kg | (Russia) Gadzhi Gadzhiev | def. | (Belarus) Artem Spichak | TKO (Punches) | 1 | 2:16 | |
| MMA Light Heavyweight 93 kg | (Russia) Artur Astakhov | def. | (Russia) Sergey Klassen | TKO (Punches) | 1 | 2:52 | |

== Fight Nights: Battle Of Moscow 8 ==
Fight Nights: Battle Of Moscow 8
- Promotion: Fight Nights Global
- Date: November 3, 2012
- Venue: Sokolniki Arena
- City: Moscow, Russia

Event chronology
| Fight Nights: Battle of Desne | Fight Nights: Battle Of Moscow 8 | Fight Nights: Battle Of Moscow 9 |

Fight Nights: Battle Of Moscow 8 was a mixed martial arts and kickboxing event held by Fight Nights Global on November 3, 2012 at the Sokolniki Arena in Moscow, Russia.

=== Result ===
Fight Card
| Weight Class | | | | Method | Round | Time | Notes |
|---|---|---|---|---|---|---|---|
| Kickboxing 72 kg | (Russia) Batu Khasikov | def. | (Armenia) Gago Drago | KO (Right Hook) | 1 | 2:38 | |
| MMA Welterweight 77 kg | (Russia) Murad Abdulaev | def. | (Hungary) Viktor Halmi | Decision (Unanimous) | 2 | 5:00 | |
| MMA Heavyweight 120 kg | (Belgium) Marc Vlieger | def. | (Russia) Ibragim Halilov | Submission (Triangle Choke) | 1 | 2:12 | |
| MMA Lightweight 70 kg | (Russia) Zubaira Tukhugov | def. | (Netherlands) Romano de los Reyes | Decision (Unanimous) | 2 | 5:00 | |
| MMA Featherweight 66 kg | (Russia) Timur Valiev | def. | (Russia) Oleg Borisov | Decision (Unanimous) | 3 | 5:00 | |
| MMA Middleweight 84 kg | (Russia) Arsen Aliev | def. | (Germany) Daniel Kimmling | TKO (Punches) | 1 | 1:10 | |
| MMA Lightweight 70 kg | (Russia) Islam Mamedov | def. | (Russia) Evgeniy Zuev | Submission (Armbar) | 2 | 2:33 | |
| MMA Welterweight 77 kg | (Russia) Sergey Yakovlev | def. | (Russia) Aigun Akhmedov | Decision (Unanimous) | 2 | 5:00 | |
| MMA Welterweight 77 kg | (Russia) Marif Piraev | def. | (Russia) Alexey Gannenko | TKO (Punches) | 1 | 2:23 | |
| MMA Lightweight 70 kg | (Russia) Nikolai Denisov | def. | (Russia) Semen Batuev | Submission (Triangle Choke) | 1 | 4:45 | |

== Fight Nights: Battle Of Moscow 9 ==
Fight Nights: Battle Of Moscow 9
- Promotion: Fight Nights Global
- Date: December 16, 2012
- Venue: Dynamo Sports Palace
- City: Moscow, Russia

Event chronology
| Fight Nights: Battle Of Moscow 8 | Fight Nights: Battle Of Moscow 9 |

Fight Nights: Battle Of Moscow 9 was a mixed martial arts and kickboxing event held by Fight Nights Global on December 16, 2012 at the Dynamo Sports Palace in Moscow, Russia.

=== Result ===
Fight Card
| Weight Class | | | | Method | Round | Time | Notes |
|---|---|---|---|---|---|---|---|
| Kickboxing 91 kg | (Russia) Vladimir Mineev | def. | (Turkey) Ali Cenik | Decision (Majority) | 4 | 3:00 | |
| MMA Heavyweight 120 kg | (Belarus) Andrei Arlovski | def. | (United States) Mike Hayes | Decision (Unanimous) | 3 | 5:00 | |
| MMA Flyweight 57 kg | (Russia) Ali Bagautinov | def. | (Germany) Andreas Bernhard | TKO (Punches) | 1 | 0:27 | |
| MMA Welterweight 77 kg | (Russia) Akhmet Aliev | def. | (Hungary) Viktor Halmi | KO (Punch to the Body) | 3 | 4:37 | |
| Kickboxing 91 kg | (Russia) Ramazan Ramazanov | def. | (Netherlands) Fabian Gondorf | Decision (Unanimous) | 3 | 3:00 | |
| Kickboxing 80 kg | (Russia) Alexander Stetsurenko | def. | (Armenia) Karapet Karapetyan | Decision (Split) | 3 | 3:00 | |
| MMA Catchweight 72.5 kg | (Russia) Murad Machaev | def. | (Croatia) Ivica Trušček | Submission (Guillotine Choke) | 1 | 2:13 | |
| MMA Light Heavyweight 93 kg | (Russia) Abdul-Kerim Edilov | def. | (Belarus) Nicholas Boyarchuk | Submission (Rear Naked Choke) | 1 | 1:13 | |
| MMA Heavyweight 120 kg | (Russia) Konstantin Erokhin | def. | (Netherlands) Jermaine Van Rooy | KO (Knee and Punches) | 1 | 0:42 | |
| MMA Middleweight 84 kg | (Russia) Magomed Magomedov | def. | (Russia) Denis Genyuk | Submission (Rear Naked Choke) | 1 | 1:16 | |
