= 2018 in Fight Nights Global =

Information
- First date: February 22, 2018

Events

Fights

Chronology
2017 in Fight Nights Global	2018 in Fight Nights Global	2019 in Fight Nights Global

The year 2018 was the 8th year in the history of the Fight Nights Global, a mixed martial arts promotion based in Russia. The company continues broadcasts through Match TV, Fight Network and is looking for a new US-based platform since the contract with UFC Fight Pass has been terminated.

== List of events ==
#	Event title	Date	Arena	Location
1	Fight Nights Global 83: Alibekov vs. Aliev	February 22, 2018	Luzhniki Palace of Sports	Moscow, Russia
2	Fight Nights Global 84: Deák vs. Chupanov	March 2, 2018	Hant Arena	Bratislava, Slovakia
3	Fight Nights Global 85: Alikhanov vs. Kopylov	March 30, 2018	VTB Ice Palace	Moscow, Russia
4	Fight Nights Global 86: Nam vs. Zhumagulov	April 1, 2018	Almaty Arena	Almaty, Kazakhstan
5	Fight Nights Global 87: Khachatryan vs. Queally	May 19, 2018	KSK Express	Rostov-on-Don, Russia
6	Fight Nights Global: Summer Cup 2018	June 30, 2018	TBA	Bozhou, China
7	Fight Nights Global 88	August 31, 2018	Alau Arena	Astana, Kazakhstan
8	Fight Nights Global 89	September 8, 2018	TBA	Bozhou, China
9	Fight Nights Global 90: Mineev vs. Ismailov	October 19, 2018	VTB Ice Palace	Moscow, Russia
10	Fight Nights Global 91	December 27, 2018	Cition Hall	Moscow, Russia

== Fight Nights Global 83: Alibekov vs. Aliev ==
FNG 83: Alibekov vs. Aliev
- Promotion: Fight Nights Global
- Date: February 22, 2018
- Venue: Luzhniki Palace of Sports
- City: Moscow, Russia

Event chronology
FNG 82	FNG 83: Alibekov vs. Aliev	FNG 84

Fight Nights Global 83: Alibekov vs. Aliev was a mixed martial arts event held by Fight Nights Global on February 22, 2018 at the Luzhniki Palace of Sports (SCCH "Rossiya") in Moscow, Russia.

=== Background ===
This event will feature two world title fights, first for the Fight Nights Global Lightweight Championship between the champion Magomedsaygid Alibekov and Akhmed Aliev as Fight Nights Global 83 headliner, and for the inaugural Fight Nights Global Women's Bantamweight Championship between Marina Mokhnatkina and Liana Jojua as co-headliner.

The event will also feature the debut of Dominique Steele with Fight Nights Global organisation against Nikolay Aleksakhin and the return of Khabib Nurmagomedov cousin Umar Nurmagomedov against the cousin of Featherweight standout Goiti Yamauchi, the Brazilian Shyudi Yamauchi.

=== Results ===
Fight Card
Weight Class				Method	Round	Time	Notes
Lightweight 70 kg	(Russia) Akhmed Aliev	def.	(Russia) Magomedsaygid Alibekov (c)	KO (Spinning Wheel Kick)	3	4:19	For the FNG Lightweight Championship
Women's Bantamweight 61 kg	(Georgia (country)) Liana Jojua	def.	(Russia) Marina Mokhnatkina	Decision (Majority)	5	5:00	For the inaugural FNG Women's Bantamweight Championship
Welterweight 77 kg	(Russia) Nikolay Aleksakhin	def.	(United States) Dominique Steele	TKO (Punches)	1	2:37	
Bantamweight 61 kg	(Russia) Umar Nurmagomedov	def.	(Brazil) Shyudi Yamauchi	Decision (Unanimous)	3	5:00	
Welterweight 77 kg	(Russia) Dmitry Bikrev	def.	(Russia) Vasiliy Zubkov	KO (Punches)	1	4:43	
Flyweight 57 kg	(Russia) Vartan Asatryan	def.	(Russia) Rizvan Abuev	Decision (Unanimous)	3	5:00	
Heavyweight 120 kg	(Russia) Ali Isaev	def.	(Russia) Vladimir Daineko	TKO (Punches)	2	0:40	
Light Heavyweight 93 kg	(Russia) Aleksey Sidorenko	def.	(Iran) Hasan Yousefi	KO (Punch)	1	1:41	
Bantamweight 61 kg	(Russia) Bakhachali Bakhachaliev	def.	(Kazakhstan) Ruslan Serikpulov	Submission (Inverted Triangle Choke)	2	3:26	
Lightweight 70 kg	(Russia) Gadzhi Rabadanov	def.	(Russia) Igor Tarytsa	Decision (Unanimous)	3	5:00	
Women's Bantamweight 61 kg	(Russia) Svetlana Zotkina	def.	(Russia) Olga Vlasova	Submission (Armbar)	1	3:28	

== Fight Nights Global 84: Deák vs. Chupanov ==
FNG 84: Deák vs. Chupanov
- Promotion: Fight Nights Global
- Date: March 2, 2018
- Venue: Hant Arena
- City: Bratislava, Slovakia

Event chronology
FNG 83: Alibekov vs. Aliev	FNG 84: Deák vs. Chupanov

Fight Nights Global 84: Deák vs. Chupanov was a mixed martial arts event held by Fight Nights Global on March 2, 2018 at the Hant Arena in Bratislava, Slovakia.

=== Results ===
Fight Card
Weight Class				Method	Round	Time	Notes
Bantamweight 61 kg	(Slovakia) Tomáš Deák	def.	(Russia) Sharamazan Chupanov	TKO (Punches)	5	3:17	For the FNG Bantamweight Championship
Flyweight 57 kg	(Russia) Ali Bagautinov	def.	(Northern Ireland) Andy Young	Decision (Unanimous)	3	5:00	
Heavyweight 120 kg	(Czech Republic) Viktor Pešta	def.	(Russia) Alexander Gladkov	Decision (Unanimous)	3	5:00	
Welterweight 77 kg	(Switzerland) Yasubey Enomoto	def.	(Russia) Shamil Amirov	TKO (Punches)	3	4:01	
Middleweight 84 kg	(Georgia (country)) Nodar Kudukhashvili	def.	(Slovakia) Samuel Krištofič	Decision (Unanimous)	3	5:00	
Middleweight 84 kg	(Poland) Filip Tomczak	def.	(Slovakia) Jozef Wittner	TKO (Punches)	3	1:57	
Heavyweight 120 kg	(Ukraine) Yevgeny Orlov	def.	(Austria) Dritan Barjamaj	Submission (Von Flue choke)	1	1:03	
Welterweight 77 kg	(Russia) Maxim Butorin	def.	(Ukraine) Vitaliy Stoyan	Submission (Rear-Naked Choke)	1	4:27	
Middleweight 84 kg	(Slovakia) Marek Mazuch	def.	(France) Abdoul Karim Barrate Soulake	TKO (Punches)	2	2:07	

== Fight Nights Global 85: Alikhanov vs. Kopylov ==
FNG 85: Alikhanov vs. Kopylov
- Promotion: Fight Nights Global
- Date: March 30, 2018
- Venue: VTB Ice Palace
- City: Moscow, Russia

Event chronology
FNG 84: Deák vs. Chupanov	FNG 85: Alikhanov vs. Kopylov

Fight Nights Global 85: Alikhanov vs. Kopylov was a mixed martial arts event held by Fight Nights Global on March 30, 2018 at the VTB Ice Palace in Moscow, Russia.

=== Background ===
This event featured two world title fights, first for the Fight Nights Global Middleweight Championship between the champion Abusupyan Alikhanov and the challenger Roman Kopylov as Fight Nights Global 85 headliner, and for the interim Fight Nights Global Welterweight Championship between Aliaskhab Khizriev and Rousimar Palhares as co-headliner.

The card was originally co-headlined by a title fight between champion Alexander Matmuratov and challenger Movlid Khaibulaev for the Fight Nights Global Featherweight Championship. On March 28, it was announced Khaibulaev had to withdraw due to an injury, the fight was canceled.

Vladimir Mineev was injured during his preparation for the against Magomed Ismailov. Mineev is out due to lateral ligament rupture, the bout has been temporarily postponed. Ildemar Alcântara stepped in on short notice to face Ismailov.

=== Results ===
Fight Card
Weight Class				Method	Round	Time	Notes
Middleweight 84 kg	(Russia) Roman Kopylov	def.	(Russia) Abdulsupyan Alikhanov (c)	TKO (Injury)	4	5:00	For the FNG Middleweight Championship
Welterweight 77 kg	(Russia) Aliaskhab Khizriev	def.	(Brazil) Rousimar Palhares	KO (Punches)	1	0:58	For the Interim FNG Welterweight Championship
Middleweight 84 kg	(Russia) Magomed Ismailov	def.	(Brazil) Ildemar Alcântara	TKO (Punches)	1	3:41	
Welterweight 77 kg	(Russia) Raimond Magomedaliev	def.	(Brazil) Valdir Araujo	KO (Head Kick and Punches)	1	0:17	
Featherweight 66 kg	(Russia) Magomed Yunusilau	def.	(South Africa) Boyd Allen	Decision (Unanimous)	3	5:00	
Featherweight 66 kg	(Russia) Akhmed Balkizov	def.	(Tajikistan) Bekhruz Zugurov	Decision (Unanimous)	3	5:00	
Welterweight 77 kg	(Russia) Zelim Imadaev	def.	(Croatia) Ivan Gluhak	KO (Punches)	1	0:13	
Lightweight 70 kg	(Russia) Maxim Shchekin	def.	(Switzerland) Gabriel Sabo	KO (Punches)	1	3:35	
Lightweight 70 kg	(Moldova) Andrei Ciubotaru	def.	(Turkey) Murat Kazgan	TKO (Punches)	1	3:19	
Light Heavyweight 93 kg	(Russia) Vladimir Seliverstov	def.	(Russia) Aleksander Dankov	TKO (Punches)	1	4:33	
Flyweight 57 kg	(Russia) Julia Borisova	def.	(Uzbekistan) Liliya Shakirova	Decision (Unanimous)	3	5:00	Women's Flyweight Grand Prix Semi-Finals
Heavyweight 120 kg	(Russia) Ismail Sagov	def.	(Tajikistan) Eradzh Kholov	KO (Punches)	1	0:10	
Bantamweight 61 kg	(Iran) Ali Yousefi	def.	(Russia) Nikolay Baykin	Decision (Unanimous)	3	5:00	

== Fight Nights Global 86: Nam vs. Zhumagulov ==
FNG 86: Nam vs. Zhumagulov
- Promotion: Fight Nights Global
- Date: April 1, 2018
- Venue: Almaty Arena
- City: Almaty, Kazakhstan

Fight Nights Global 86: Nam vs. Zhumagulov was a mixed martial arts event held by Fight Nights Global on April 1, 2018 at the Almaty Arena in Almaty, Kazakhstan.

=== Results ===
Fight Card
Weight Class				Method	Round	Time	Notes
Flyweight 57 kg	(Kazakhstan) Zhalgas Zhumagulov	def.	(United States) Tyson Nam	Decision (Unanimous)	5	5:00	
Featherweight 66 kg	(Russia) Rasul Mirzaev	def.	(Kazakhstan) Yerzhan Estanov	Decision (Extra Round)	2	4:00	ADCC Rules
Lightweight 70 kg	(Azerbaijan) Nariman Abbasov	def.	(Kazakhstan) Adil Boranbayev	Decision (Unanimous)	3	5:00	
Bantamweight 61 kg	(Kazakhstan) Zhuman Zhumabekov	def.	(Kazakhstan) Nikita Baltabaev	TKO (Punches)	2	1:40	
Bantamweight 61 kg	(Russia) Nikita Mikhailov	def.	(Kazakhstan) Sabit Zhusupov	Decision (Split)	3	5:00	
Middleweight 84 kg	(Kazakhstan) Dauren Ermekov	def.	(Georgia (country)) Giorgi Lobzhanidze	TKO (Punches)	2	2:37	
Featherweight 66 kg	(Kazakhstan) Muratbek Kasimbay	def.	(Russia) Renat Ondar	TKO (Punches)	2	1:40	
Featherweight 66 kg	(Russia) Artur Magomedov	def.	(Kazakhstan) Ruslan Serikpulov	Submission (Armbar)	1	2:19	
Featherweight 66 kg	(Russia) Mansour Khabibulaev	def.	(Russia) Yusup Saadulaev	Decision (Point)	1	8:00	ADCC Rules

== Fight Nights Global 87: Khachatryan vs. Queally ==
FNG 87: Khachatryan vs; Queally
- Promotion: Fight Nights Global
- Date: May 19, 2018
- Venue: KSK Express
- City: Rostov-on-Don, Russia

Fight Nights Global 87: Khachatryan vs. Queally was a mixed martial arts event held by Fight Nights Global on May 19, 2018 in Rostov-on-Don, Russia.

=== Results ===
Fight Card
Weight Class				Method	Round	Time	Notes
Lightweight 70 kg	(Republic of Ireland) Peter Queally	def.	(Armenia) David Khachatryan	TKO (Punches)	1	3:52	
Light Heavyweight 93 kg	(Ukraine) Nikita Krylov	def.	(Brazil) Fábio Maldonado	KO (Punch)	2	3:33	For the FNG Light Heavyweight Championship
Lightweight 70 kg	(Russia) Alexandr Shabliy	def.	(Brazil) Adriano Martins	Decision (Unanimous)	3	5:00	
Light Heavyweight 93 kg	(Russia) Khalid Murtazaliev	def.	(Russia) Alexey Sidorenko	Decision (Unanimous)	3	5:00	
Welterweight 77 kg	(Russia) Nikolay Gaponov	def.	(Russia) Daniil Voevodin	Submission (Rear-Naked Choke)	1	1:18	
Welterweight 77 kg	(United States) Michael Graves	vs.	(Russia) Murat Khasanov	Draw (Majority)	3	5:00	
Welterweight 77 kg	(Brazil) Elias Silvério	def.	(Russia) Saygid Izagakhmaev	Decision (Unanimous)	3	5:00	
Featherweight 66 kg	(Armenia) Mihran Harutyunyan	def.	(Iran) Ali Yousefi	Submission (Shoulder Choke)	2	0:47	
Bantamweight 61 kg	(Russia) Vladimir Egoyan	def.	(Russia) Alexander Yanishev	Decision (Unanimous)	3	5:00	
Welterweight 77 kg	(Russia) David Gladun	def.	(Russia) Chermen Kobesov	TKO (Punches)	1	4:33	
Light Heavyweight 93 kg	(Russia) Shamil Tinagadzhiev	def.	(Russia) Alexey Zhuravlev	DQ (Spitting Out Mouthpiece)	3	2:59	
Middleweight 84 kg	(Russia) Makhach Khvadzhaev	def.	(Russia) Evgeny Gontarev	Decision (Unanimous)	3	5:00	

== Fight Nights Global: Summer Cup 2018 ==
Fight Nights Global: Summer Cup 2018
- Promotion: Fight Nights Global
- Date: June 30, 2018
- Venue: TBA
- City: Bozhou, China

Fight Nights Global: Summer Cup 2018 was a mixed martial arts event held by Fight Nights Global on June 30, 2018 in Bozhou, China.

=== Results ===
Fight Card
Weight Class				Method	Round	Time	Notes
Heavyweight 120 kg	(Belarus) Alexei Kudin	def.	(United States) Cody East	TKO (Retirement)	5		
Flyweight 57 kg	(Russia) Shamil Djakhbarov	def.	(China) Xiaoliang Zheng	Submission (Choke)	2		
Welterweight 77 kg	(China) Yi Da Er Jia	def.	(Russia) Vladimir Tyurin	Decision	3	5:00	
Featherweight 66 kg	(Russia) Alexander Pisarev	def.	(China) Xin Sheng Liu	TKO	1		
Flyweight 57 kg	(China) Xiaoman La Bi	def.	(Russia) Yulia Kuharchuk	Decision	3	5:00	
Heavyweight 120 kg	(Russia) Yusup Shuaev	def.	(China) Buren Mende	TKO	1		
Bantamweight 61 kg	(Russia) Arip Yakubov	def.	(Iran) Ali Fathi	TKO	2		
Lightweight 70 kg	(Russia) Yury Ryaboy	def.	(China) Uighur Shala	Submission (Choke)	1		
Featherweight 66 kg	(Russia) Abdulla Puladov	def.	(China) Wen Ye	Decision	3	5:00	
Flyweight 57 kg	(China) Deligerihu Liu	def.	(Tajikistan) Shuhrat Khakimov	Decision	3	5:00	
Lightweight 70 kg	(China) Ma Shuang	def.	(Russia) Makhach Aliev	Submission (Heel Hook)	1		

== Fight Nights Global 88 ==
FNG 88
- Promotion: Fight Nights Global
- Date: August 31, 2018
- Venue: Alau Arena
- City: Astana, Kazakhstan

Fight Nights Global 88 was a mixed martial arts event held by Fight Nights Global on August 31, 2018 at the Alau Arena in Astana, Kazakhstan.

=== Results ===
Fight Card
Weight Class				Method	Round	Time	Notes
Flyweight 57 kg	(Kazakhstan) Zhalgas Zhumagulov	def.	(Russia) Tagir Ulanbekov	Decision (Majority)	5	5:00	For the FNG Flyweight Championship
Flyweight 57 kg	(Kazakhstan) Asu Almabayev	def.	(Russia) Saud Karagishov	TKO (Punches)	2	4:09	
Bantamweight 61 kg	(Kazakhstan) Sabit Zhusupov	def.	(Russia) Faridzhulla Kurbanov	Decision (Majority)	3	5:00	
Bantamweight 61 kg	(Russia) Mukhamed Eminov	def.	(Kazakhstan) Zhuman Zhumabekov	TKO (Doctor Stoppage)	1	2:12	
Featherweight 66 kg	(Kazakhstan) Zhasulan Akimzhanov	def.	(Tajikistan) Radzhabali Fayzidini	TKO (Punches)	1	3:17	
Flyweight 57 kg	(Kazakhstan) Makhamed Meiramov	def.	(Uzbekistan) Boburmirso Yusupboev	TKO	1	2:36	
Featherweight 66 kg	(Kazakhstan) Zamzagul Fayzallanova	def.	(Russia) Alena Gorchinskaya	TKO	1	2:33	
Lightweight 70 kg	(Kazakhstan) Nikolay Samusev	def.	(Russia) Ilsur Khamzin	TKO	1	4:51	
Featherweight 66 kg	(Russia) Vladimir Ishmenev	def.	(Kazakhstan) Farkhad Sarsenbekov	Decision (Split)	3	5:00	
Bantamweight 61 kg	(Kazakhstan) Daniyar Koishybek	def.	(Russia) Avlied Khamidov	Submission	1	2:29	

== Fight Nights Global 89 ==
FNG 89
- Promotion: Fight Nights Global
- Date: September 8, 2018
- Venue: TBA
- City: Bozhou, China

Fight Nights Global 89 was a mixed martial arts event held by Fight Nights Global on September 8, 2018 in Bozhou, China.

=== Results ===
Fight Card
Weight Class				Method	Round	Time	Notes
Middleweight 84 kg	(Russia) Vladimir Mineev	def.	(Belarus) Pavel Masalski	Submission (Choke)	1	2:25	
Welterweight 77 kg	(Russia) Sergey Lyubimov	def.	(China) Si Le Hu	Submission (Choke)	1	4:52	
Lightweight 70 kg	(Russia) Makhach Aliev	def.	(China) Zheng Zheng Yue	Submission (Choke)	1	2:48	
Featherweight 66 kg	(China) Ba Yer Jeng	def.	(Brazil) Rodrigo Anraku	Submission (Armbar)	1	0:45	
Flyweight 57 kg	(Brazil) Daniel Cruz da Silva	def.	(Russia) Abdurakhman Askhabov	Submission (Choke)	2	1:54	
Strawweight 52 kg	(Russia) Daria Mikheeva	def.	(China) Xin Miao Zhang	Submission (Choke)	1	0:35	
Featherweight 66 kg	(Russia) Konstantin Kireev	def.	(China) Ma Shuang	DQ (Timidity)	2	1:03	
Featherweight 66 kg	(China) Yewen	def.	(Russia) Bashir Ramazanov	Decision (Unanimous)	3	5:00	

== Fight Nights Global 90: Mineev vs. Ismailov ==
FNG 90: Mineev vs. Ismailov
- Promotion: Fight Nights Global
- Date: October 19, 2018
- Venue: VTB Ice Palace
- City: Moscow, Russia

Fight Nights Global 90: Mineev vs. Ismailov was a mixed martial arts event held by Fight Nights Global on October 19, 2018 in Moscow.

=== Results ===
Fight Card
Weight Class				Method	Round	Time	Notes
Middleweight 84 kg	(Russia) Vladimir Mineev	vs.	(Russia) Magomed Ismailov	Draw (Split)	5	5:00	
Heavyweight 120 kg	(Russia) Ali Isaev	def.	(Russia) Alexander Gladkov	KO (Spinning Wheel Kick and Punches)	1	1:36	
Lightweight 70 kg	(Belarus) Ruslan Kolodko	def.	(Russia) Maksim Schekin	Submission (Armbar)	1	4:20	
Bantamweight 61 kg	(Russia) Mukhamed Eminov	def.	(Russia) Vladimir Egoyan	Decision (Majority)	3	5:00	
Featherweight 66 kg	(Tajikistan) Bekhruz Zukhurov	def.	(Russia) Ilya Kurzanov	TKO (Punches)	2	4:15	
Bantamweight 61 kg	(Russia) Evgeniy Ignatiev	def.	(Russia) Sharamazan Shupanov	Decision (Unanimous)	3	5:00	
Welterweight 77 kg	(Russia) Maxim Butorin	def.	(Russia) Maxim Panshin	TKO (Punches)	1	1:27	
Lightweight 70 kg	(Azerbaijan) Nariman Abbasov	def.	(Georgia (country)) Mikhail Gogitidze	TKO (Knee and Punches)	1	2:24	
Featherweight 66 kg	(Russia) Bachachali Bakhachaliev	def.	(Kazakhstan) Igor Zhirkov	Decision (Unanimous)	3	5:00	
Bantamweight 61 kg	(Kazakhstan) Nikita Baltabaev	def.	(Russia) Grachik Engibaryan	Submission (Kneebar)	1	4:13	
Welterweight 77 kg	(Russia) Kirill Kryukov	def.	(Russia) Dmitry Morozov	TKO (Knees)	3	1:35	
Featherweight 66 kg	(Russia) Gadzhi Rabadanov	def.	(Kyrgyzstan) Bekbolot Abdylda	Decision (Unanimous)	3	5:00	
Middleweight 84 kg	(Russia) Karakhan Balakerimov	def.	(Algeria) Azubuike Ikenna Okafor	TKO (Slam and Punches)	1	0:27	
Lightweight 70 kg	(Tajikistan) Safarbek Kurbonov	def.	(Russia) Khamrokul Yusupov	Submission (Rear-Naked Choke)	1	2:13	

== Fight Nights Global 91 ==
FNG 91
- Promotion: Fight Nights Global
- Date: December 27, 2018
- Venue: Cition Hall
- City: Moscow, Russia

Fight Nights Global 91 was a mixed martial arts event held by Fight Nights Global on December 27, 2018 in Moscow.

=== Results ===
Fight Card
Weight Class				Method	Round	Time	Notes
Middleweight 84 kg	(Russia) Roman Kopylov	def.	(Switzerland) Yasubey Enomoto	KO (Punch to the body)	4	3:39	For the FNG Middleweight Championship
Heavyweight 120 kg	(Russia) Anatoly Malykhin	def.	(Russia) Magomedbag Agaev	Submission (Keylock)	1	1:22	
Welterweight 77 kg	(Russia) David Gladun	def.	(Russia) Yurik Smoyan	KO (Punches)	1	3:08	
Welterweight 77 kg	(Russia) Kirill Kryukov	vs.	(Russia) Alexey Martynov	Decision (Majority draw)	3	5:00	
Bantamweight 61 kg	(Russia) Armen Gulyan	def.	(Kyrgyzstan) Sadik Ryskeldi	TKO (Punches)	1	3:37	
Catchweight 80 kg	(Russia) Shamil Ramazanov	def.	(Russia) Supyan Babugov	Submission (Anaconda Choke)	1	4:34	
Welterweight 77 kg	(Russia) Gusein Gadzhiev	def.	(Russia) Vasiliy Palyok	Decision (Unanimous)	3	5:00	
Catchweight 75 kg	(Russia) Ruslan Tedeev	def.	(Russia) Arsen Batyrov	Submission (Rear-Naked choke)	1	3:41	
Middleweight 84 kg	(Russia) Ramazan Gamzatov	def.	(Russia) Maksim Mikhteev	Submission (Rear-Naked choke)	1	3:43	
Welterweight 77 kg	(Russia) Shamil Musaev	def.	(Russia) Marat Khasanov	TKO (Punches)	1	3:08	
Featherweight 66 kg	(Russia) Rasul Magomedov	def.	(Russia) Oleg Belozerov	Submission (Guillotine Choke)	1	1:38	
Catchweight 75 kg	(Russia) Uzair Abdurakov	def.	(Russia) Ruslan Annatdaev	Submission (Rear-Naked choke)	2	1:41	
Catchweight 75 kg	(Russia) Dukvakh Khasaev	def.	(Russia) Viktor Shamray	Submission (Rear-Naked choke)	1	1:39	
Welterweight 77 kg	(Russia) Maor Maasiyaev	def.	(Russia) Denis Dzhivovsky	TKO (Punches)	2	2:23	
Middleweight 84 kg	(Russia) Magomedzagid Isalov	def.	(Russia) Mikhail Moskvin	Submission (North-South Choke)	1	2:51	
