= Zhalgas Zhumagulov =

Kazakh mixed martial arts fighter

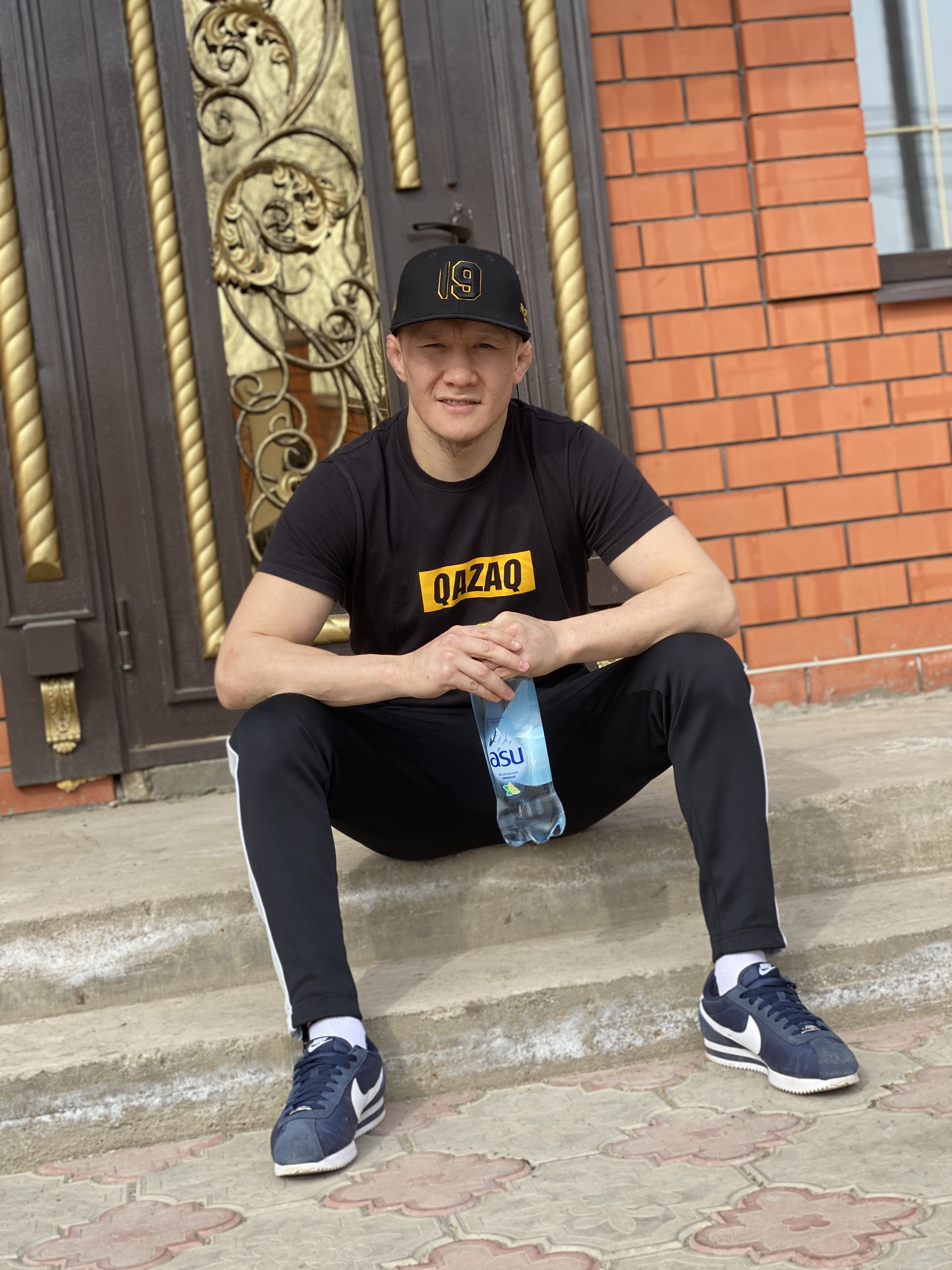
- Born: August 29, 1988 (age 38); Aktobe, Kazakh SSR, Soviet Union
- Other names: Zhako
- Nationality: Kazakh
- Height: 5 ft 4 in (1.63 m)
- Weight: 125 lb (57 kg; 8 st 13 lb)
- Division: Flyweight
- Reach: 66 in (168 cm)
- Fighting out of: Aktobe, Kazakhstan
- Team: Erkin Kush
- Years active: 2014–present

Mixed martial arts record
- Total: 29
- Wins: 19
- By knockout: 9
- By submission: 1
- By decision: 9
- Losses: 9
- By knockout: 2
- By decision: 7
- No contests: 1

Other information
- Mixed martial arts record from Sherdog

Zhalgas Zhumagulov (born August 29, 1988), is a Kazakh mixed martial artist who previously competed in the Flyweight division of the Ultimate Fighting Championship. He is the current Flyweight champion of Oktagon MMA.

== Mixed martial arts career ==
=== Early career ===
Zhumagulov hails from Kazakhstan and sported a 13-3 MMA record before entering the UFC, with notable wins including Tagir Ulanbekov, Tyson Nam at Fight Nights Global 86, Shajidul Haque, Artur Bagautinov, and others.

He won the Fight Nights Global Flyweight Championship defeating fellow future UFC fighter Tagir Ulanbekov at Fight Nights Global 88. His last bout before signing with the UFC was in October 2019, where he edged former UFC flyweight title challenger Ali Bagautinov via split decision in the Fight Nights Global 95 main event.

=== Ultimate Fighting Championship ===
Zhumagulov made his promotional debut against Raulian Paiva on July 11, 2020, at UFC 251. At the weigh ins, Paiva weighed in at 129 pounds, 3 pounds over the flyweight non-title limit. He was fined 20% of his purse, which went to Zhumagulov. The bout proceeded at catchweight. He lost the fight via controversial unanimous decision. 16 out of 20 media outlets scored the bout as a win for Zhumagulov.

Zhumagulov was scheduled to face Amir Albazi at UFC on ESPN: Smith vs. Clark, but Zhumagulov pulled out due to visa issues and the bout was rescheduled for UFC 257 on January 24, 2021. He lost the bout via unanimous decision.

Zhumagulov faced Jerome Rivera on July 10, 2021, at UFC 264. He won the fight via a guillotine choke in round one.

Zhumagulov faced Manel Kape on December 4, 2021, at UFC on ESPN 31. He lost the fight via technical knockout in round one.

Zhumagulov faced Jeff Molina on June 4, 2022, at UFC Fight Night: Volkov vs. Rozenstruik. He lost the bout via controversial split decision. 12 out of 13 media scores gave it to Zhumagulov.

Zhumagulov faced former LFA flyweight champion Charles Johnson UFC Fight Night 215. He lost the fight via split decision. 12 out of 13 media outlets scored the fight in favor of Zhumagulov.

Zhumagulov was scheduled to face Nate Maness on May 6, 2023 at UFC 288, but Nate Maness pulled out of the fight due to injury and was replaced by UFC newcomer Rafael Estevam, who was originally scheduled to face Carlos Candelario on April 22, 2023 at UFC Fight Night 222. In turn, the bout was scratched the day before the event due to Estevam having weight management issues.

Zhumagulov was scheduled to face Felipe Bunes on June 17, 2023 at UFC on ESPN 47. However due to medical issues, Bunes pulled out of the bout and was replaced by Joshua Van. He lost the bout via split decision.

On July 13, 2023, it was announced that Zhumagulov had completed his contract and was not renewed.

=== Post-UFC career ===
Zhumagulov was originally scheduled to fight at Kazakhstan's Naiza FC 55 fight card on December 2, 2023 against Iago Ribeiro. The event was postponed to December 6, 2023 and Zhumagulov faced Masato Nakamura instead. Zhumagulov snapped his four-fight losing streak by winning the bout by TKO due to punches after ground-and-pound.

Zhumagulov faced Cleveland McLean at Kazakhstan's Naiza FC 57 fight card on February 24, 2024 and won by unanimous decision.

Zhumagulov faced Aaron Aby on November 9, 2024 at Oktagon 63. He won the fight by unanimous decision.

On June 28, 2025, Zhumagulov competed for the Oktagon Flyweight Championship against Beno Adamia (who missed weight and was stripped of the title) at Oktagon Flyweight Championship and won the championship via unanimous decision.

On December 28, 2025, Zhumagulov successfully defended the Flyweight Championship via unanimous decision against David Dvořák at Oktagon 81.

== Personal life ==
Zhumagulov has two wives and six children.

== Championships and accomplishments ==
=== Mixed martial arts ===
- Oktagon MMA
  - Oktagon Flyweight Championship (One time, current)
    - One successful defense
- Fight Nights Global
  - Fight Nights Global Flyweight Championship (One time)
    - One successful defense
- Ultimate Fighting Championship
  - Tied (Jesse Ronson & Dennis Bermudez) for most consecutive split decision losses in UFC history (3)

== Mixed martial arts record ==
Professional record breakdown
29 matches	19 wins	9 losses
By knockout	9	2
By submission	1	0
By decision	9	7
No contests	1	

Res.	Record	Opponent	Method	Event	Date	Round	Time	Location	Notes
NC	19–9 (1)	Igor Severino	NC (accidental punch to the groin)	Oktagon 89	June 6, 2026	2	2:26	Bratislava, Slovakia	For the Oktagon Bantamweight Championship. Accidental punch to the groin rendered Zhumagulov unable to continue.
Win	19–9	David Dvořák	TKO (doctor stoppage)	Oktagon 81	December 28, 2025	3	5:00	Prague, Czech Republic	Defended the Oktagon Flyweight Championship.
Win	18–9	Beno Adamia	Decision (unanimous)	Oktagon 73	June 28, 2025	5	5:00	Hamburg, Germany	Won the vacant Oktagon Flyweight Championship. Adamia missed weight (127 lb) and was stripped of the title. Only Zhumagulov was eligible to win the title.
Win	17–9	Aaron Aby	Decision (unanimous)	Oktagon 63	November 9, 2024	3	5:00	Bratislava, Slovakia	
Win	16–9	Cleveland McLean	Decision (unanimous)	Naiza FC 57	February 24, 2024	3	5:00	Almaty, Kazakhstan	Bantamweight bout.
Win	15–9	Masato Nakamura	TKO (punches)	Naiza FC 55	December 6, 2023	1	1:42	Astana, Kazakhstan	
Loss	14–9	Joshua Van	Decision (split)	UFC on ABC: Emmett vs. Topuria	June 24, 2023	3	5:00	Jacksonville, Florida, United States	
Loss	14–8	Charles Johnson	Decision (split)	UFC Fight Night: Nzechukwu vs. Cuțelaba	November 19, 2022	3	5:00	Las Vegas, Nevada, United States	
Loss	14–7	Jeff Molina	Decision (split)	UFC Fight Night: Volkov vs. Rozenstruik	June 4, 2022	3	5:00	Las Vegas, Nevada, United States	
Loss	14–6	Manel Kape	TKO (punches)	UFC on ESPN: Font vs. Aldo	December 4, 2021	1	4:02	Las Vegas, Nevada, United States	
Win	14–5	Jerome Rivera	Submission (guillotine choke)	UFC 264	July 10, 2021	1	2:02	Las Vegas, Nevada, United States	
Loss	13–5	Amir Albazi	Decision (unanimous)	UFC 257	January 24, 2021	3	5:00	Abu Dhabi, United Arab Emirates	
Loss	13–4	Raulian Paiva	Decision (unanimous)	UFC 251	July 12, 2020	3	5:00	Abu Dhabi, United Arab Emirates	Catchweight (129 lb) bout; Paiva missed weight.
Win	13–3	Ali Bagautinov	Decision (split)	Fight Nights Global 95	October 19, 2019	5	5:00	Sochi, Russia	Defended the FNG Flyweight Championship.
Win	12–3	Tagir Ulanbekov	Decision (majority)	Fight Nights Global 88	August 31, 2018	5	5:00	Astana, Kazakhstan	Won the FNG Flyweight Championship.
Win	11–3	Tyson Nam	Decision (unanimous)	Fight Nights Global 86	April 1, 2018	5	5:00	Almaty, Kazakhstan	
Win	10–3	Shajidul Haque	Decision (unanimous)	Fight Nights Global 80	November 26, 2017	3	5:00	Almaty, Kazakhstan	
Loss	9–3	Vartan Asatryan	Decision (split)	Fight Nights Global 65	May 19, 2017	5	5:00	Astana, Kazakhstan	For the FNG Flyweight Championship.
Win	9–2	Artur Bagautinov	KO (punch)	Fight Nights Global 62	March 31, 2017	2	1:53	Moscow, Russia	
Win	8–2	Ivan Andrushchenko	Decision (unanimous)	Fight Nights Global 55	November 22, 2016	3	5:00	Moscow, Russia	
Win	7–2	Oscar Dolchin	Decision (unanimous)	Fight Nights Global 46	April 29, 2016	3	5:00	Moscow, Russia	
Loss	6–2	Zhifa Shang	Decision (split)	Kunlun Fight: Cage Fight Series 3	July 6, 2015	3	5:00	Chongqing, China	Return to Flyweight.
Loss	6–1	Vartan Asatryan	TKO (punches)	Alash Pride: Royal Plaza Volume 2	January 24, 2015	2	3:00	Almaty, Kazakhstan	
Win	6–0	Bekzat Aliev	TKO (punches)	Zhekpe Zhek: Bantamweight Grand Prix	October 6, 2014	3	2:10	Astana, Kazakhstan	Won the Zhekpe Zhek Bantamweight Grand Prix.
Win	5–0	Salat Biskhanov	TKO (punches)	Zhekpe Zhek: Bantamweight Grand Prix	October 6, 2014	1	1:10	Astana, Kazakhstan	Zhekpe Zhek Bantamweight Grand Prix Semifinal.
Win	4–0	Tyjybaev Andos	TKO (punches)	Zhekpe Zhek: Bantamweight Grand Prix	October 6, 2014	3	2:10	Astana, Kazakhstan	Zhekpe Zhek Bantamweight Grand Prix Quarterfinal.
Win	3–0	Nursulat Serker	TKO (punches)	Zhekpe Zhek: Bantamweight Grand Prix	October 6, 2014	1	2:47	Astana, Kazakhstan	Bantamweight debut. Zhekpe Zhek Bantamweight Grand Prix Round of 16.
Win	2–0	Nurbay Mirzaliev	TKO (submission to punches)	White Night FC: Elets Battle	September 25, 2014	2	3:14	Elets, Russia	
Win	1–0	Yerlan Semebekov	TKO (Punches)	Altay Republik MMA League: Altay vs. Siberia	September 7, 2014	1	3:54	Gorno-Altaysk, Russia	Flyweight debut.

== See also ==
- List of male mixed martial artists
