= 2016 in Fight Nights Global =

Information
- First date: February 26

Events

Fights

Chronology
2016 in Fight Nights Global	2017 in Fight Nights Global

The year 2016 was the 6th year in the history of the Fight Nights Global, a mixed martial arts promotion based in Russia. It started broadcasting through a television agreement with Match TV.

== List of events ==
#	Event title	Date	Arena	Location
1	Fight Nights Global 44	February 26, 2016	Luzhniki Palace of Sports	Moscow, Russia
2	Fight Nights Global 45	April 22, 2016	Ufa Arena	Ufa, Russia
3	Fight Nights Global 46	April 29, 2016	Ice Palace Krylatskoye	Moscow, Russia
4	Fight Nights Global 47	May 15, 2016	A2 Arena	Saint Petersburg, Russia
5	Fight Nights Global 48	May 26, 2016	Luzhniki Palace of Sports	Moscow, Russia
6	Fight Nights Global 49	June 4, 2016	Banská Bystrica Ice Stadium	Banská Bystrica, Slovakia
7	Fight Nights Global 50	June 17, 2016	Sibur Arena	Saint Petersburg, Russia
8	Fight Nights Global: Summer Cup 2016	August 27, 2016	Black Sea Arena	(Georgia (country)) Ureki, Georgia
9	Fight Nights Global 51	September 25, 2016	Ali Aliev Sports Palace	Kaspiysk, Russia
10	Fight Nights Global 52	October 1, 2016	Yubileyny Sports Palace	Nizhnevartovsk, Russia
11	Fight Nights Global 53: Day 1	October 7, 2016	Luzhniki Palace of Sports	Moscow, Russia
12	Fight Nights Global 53: Day 2	October 8, 2016	Luzhniki Palace of Sports	Moscow, Russia
13	Fight Nights Global 54	November 16, 2016	KSK Express	Rostov-on-Don, Russia
14	Fight Nights Global 55	November 22, 2016	Crocus City Hall	Moscow, Russia
15	Fight Nights Global 56	December 9, 2016	Fetisov Arena	Vladivostok, Russia
16	Fight Nights Global 57	December 16, 2016	Krylatskoye Sports Palace	Moscow, Russia

== Fight Nights Global 44: Machaev vs. Sarnavskiy ==
FNG 44: Machaev vs. Sarnavskiy
- Promotion: Fight Nights Global
- Date: February 26, 2016
- Venue: Luzhniki Palace of Sports
- City: Moscow, Russia

Fight Nights Global 44: Machaev vs. Sarnavskiy was a mixed martial arts event held by Fight Nights Global on February 26, 2016 at the Luzhniki Palace of Sports in Moscow, Russia.

=== Results ===
Fight Card
Weight Class				Method	Round	Time	Notes
Lightweight 70 kg	(Russia) Murad Machaev	def.	(Russia) Alexander Sarnavskiy	Decision (Unanimous)	3	5:00	
Catchweight 80 kg	(Russia) Vladimir Mineev	def.	(Belarus) Boris Miroshnichenko	Submission (Rear Naked Choke)	2	2:55	
Bantamweight 61 kg	(Russia) Yusup Saadulaev	def.	(Slovakia) Tomáš Deák	Submission (Kimura)	1	0:47	
Lightweight 70 kg	(Azerbaijan) Nariman Abbasov	def.	(Russia) Nikolay Gaponov	Decision (Unanimous)	3	5:00	Lightweight Grand Prix Quarter-Finals
Lightweight 70 kg	(Russia) Islam Begidov	def.	(Russia) Denis Izmodenov	Decision (Split)	3	5:00	Lightweight Grand Prix Quarter-Finals
Featherweight 66 kg	(Russia) Movlid Khaybulaev	def.	(Russia) Ruslan Yamanbaev	Decision (Unanimous)	3	5:00	
Welterweight 70 kg	(Russia) Dmitry Bikrev	def.	(Russia) Ovanes Abgaryan	TKO (Punches)	1	0:06	
Light Heavyweight 93 kg	(Russia) Kurban Omarov	def.	(Russia) Alexandr Derevyanko	Decision (Unanimous)	3	5:00	
Middleweight 84 kg	(Russia) Magomed Abdulvagabov	def.	(Tajikistan) Soleh Khasanov	TKO (Punches)	1	3:06	
Bantamweight 61 kg	(Russia) Vadim Buseev	def.	(Kyrgyzstan) Alym Isabaev	Draw	3	5:00	
Lightweight 70 kg	(Kyrgyzstan) Nemat Abdrashitov	def.	(Russia) Vladimir Skachkov	TKO (Punches)	1	1:57	
Light Heavyweight 93 kg	(Russia) Shamil Akhmedov	def.	(Russia) Maxim Mikhteev	TKO (Punches)	1	2:43	

== Fight Nights Global 45: Galiev vs. Stepanyan ==
FNG 45: Galiev vs. Stepanyan
- Promotion: Fight Nights Global
- Date: April 22, 2016
- Venue: Ufa Arena
- City: Ufa, Russia

Fight Nights Global 45: Galiev vs. Stepanyan was a mixed martial arts event held by Fight Nights Global on April 22, 2016 at the Ufa Arena in Ufa, Russia.

=== Results ===
Fight Card
Weight Class				Method	Round	Time	Notes
Catchweight 73 kg	(Russia) Vener Galiev	def.	(Armenia) Akop Stepanyan	Submission (Rear Naked Choke)	3	3:16	
Lightweight 70 kg	(Russia) Akhmet Aliev	def.	(Brazil) Ivan Jorge	KO (Punch)	2	4:25	
Featherweight 66 kg	(Russia) Akhmed Balkizov	def.	(Russia) Ruslan Yamanbaev	Submission (Guillotine Choke)	1	2:04	Featherweight Grand Prix Quarter-Finals
Light Heavyweight 120 kg	(Russia) Mikhail Ragozin	def.	(Brazil) Luis Carlos Brito	TKO (Punches)	1	1:51	
Featherweight 66 kg	(Russia) Sharamazan Chupanov	def.	(Russia) Ilgiz Sagodeev	Decision (Unanimous)	3	5:00	
Catchweight 59 kg	(Kazakhstan) Asu Almabayev	def.	(Russia) Galamirza Aivazov	Submission (Armbar)	1	3:41	
Featherweight 66 kg	(Russia) Zaur Kasumov	def.	(Russia) Viktor Kichigin	Submission (Rear Naked Choke)	2	2:43	
Catchweight 73 kg	(Russia) Denis Izmodenov	def.	(Kyrgyzstan) Tursunbek Asylgaziev	Decision (Unanimous)	3	5:00	
Light Heavyweight 93 kg	(Russia) Sergey Rakhmatulin	def.	(Uzbekistan) Sukhrob Rakhimbekov	Submission (Punches)	2	3:14	
Featherweight 66 kg	(Russia) Shakhmar Sadygov	def.	(Russia) Rinat Farsin	TKO (Doctor Stoppage)	1	1:45	
Catchweight 93 kg	(Tajikistan) Khamid Davlatov	def.	(Russia) Elnur Samigulin	KO (Punch)	1	1:10	
Featherweight 66 kg	(Russia) Nikita Merkulov	def.	(Russia) Aziz Kadiev	TKO (Punches and Elbows)	2	4:37	

== Fight Nights Global 46: Mokhnatkin vs. Kudin ==
FNG 46: Mokhnatkin vs. Kudin
- Promotion: Fight Nights Global
- Date: April 29, 2016
- Venue: Ice Palace Krylatskoye
- City: Moscow, Russia

Fight Nights Global 46: Mokhnatkin vs. Kudin was a mixed martial arts event held by Fight Nights Global on April 29, 2016 at the Ice Palace Krylatskoye in Moscow, Russia.

=== Results ===
Fight Card
Weight Class				Method	Round	Time	Notes
Heavyweight 120 kg	(Russia) Mikhail Mokhnatkin		(Belarus) Alexei Kudin	Draw	3	5:00	
Catchweight 73 kg	(Russia) Alexander Sarnavskiy	def.	(Russia) Dmitry Bikrev	Submission (Rear Naked Choke)	2	2:35	
Heavyweight 120 kg	(Russia) Sergei Pavlovich	def.	(Russia) Baga Agaev	Decision (Unanimous)	3	5:00	
Lightweight 70 kg	(Russia) Igor Egorov	def.	(Belarus) Eduard Muravitskiy	TKO (Punches)	1	0:46	Lightweight Grand Prix Quarter-Finals
Lightweight 70 kg	(Russia) Magomedsaygid Alibekov	def.	(Russia) Daniil Voevodin	Decision (Unanimous)	3	5:00	Lightweight Grand Prix Quarter-Finals
Welterweight 77 kg	(Russia) Vadim Sandulitsky	def.	(Russia) Vasiliy Zubkov	Decision (Unanimous)	3	5:00	Welterweight Grand Prix Quarter-Finals
Welterweight 77 kg	(Russia) Vladimir Tyurin	def.	(Russia) Nikolai Pryadko	KO (Punch)	1	3:27	Welterweight Grand Prix Quarter-Finals
Heavyweight 120 kg	(Russia) Ali Isaev	def.	(Russia) Timofey Mishev	Decision (Unanimous)	3	5:00	
Flyweight 57 kg	(Kazakhstan) Zhalgas Zhumagulov	def.	(Russia) Oscar Dolchin	Decision (Unanimous)	3	5:00	

== Fight Nights Global 47: Tyurin vs. Magal ==
FNG 47: Tyurin vs. Magal
- Promotion: Fight Nights Global
- Date: May 15, 2016
- Venue: A2 Arena
- City: Saint Petersburg, Russia

Fight Nights Global 47: Tyurin vs. Magal was a mixed martial arts event held by Fight Nights Global on May 15, 2016 at the A2 Arena in Saint Petersburg, Russia.

=== Results ===
Fight Card
Weight Class				Method	Round	Time	Notes
Welterweight 77 kg	(Russia) Vladimir Tyurin	def.	(Brazil) Junior Magal	KO (Punches)	1	1:11	
Welterweight 77 kg	(Russia) Georgiy Kichigin	def.	(Russia) Zalimkhan Yusupov	Decision (Unanimous)	3	5:00	Welterweight Grand Prix Quarter-Finals
Catchweight 80 kg	(Russia) Vasiliy Zubkov	def.	(Russia) Islam Yashaev	TKO (Doctor Stoppage)	1	3:31	
Catchweight 80 kg	(Russia) Dmitry Aryshev	def.	(Kazakhstan) Artem Reznikov	TKO (Punches)	2	4:42	
Light Heavyweight 93 kg	(Russia) Evgeni Kondratov	def.	(Russia) Dmitry Tebekin	Decision (Unanimous)	3	5:00	
Welterweight 77 kg	(Uzbekistan) Abdulaziz Dzhurabaev	def.	(Russia) Dmitry Berezin	Submission (Rear-Naked Choke)	2	4:50	
Female Catchweight 75 kg	(Russia) Svetlana Khautova	def.	(Russia) Daria Radionova	TKO (Punches)	2	4:13	

== Fight Nights Global 48: Enomoto vs. Molodtsov ==
FNG 48: Enomoto vs. Molodtsov
- Promotion: Fight Nights Global
- Date: May 26, 2016
- Venue: Luzhniki Palace of Sports
- City: Moscow, Russia

Fight Nights Global 48: Enomoto vs. Molodtsov was a mixed martial arts event held by Fight Nights Global on May 26, 2016 at the Luzhniki Palace of Sports in Moscow, Russia.

=== Results ===
Fight Card
Weight Class				Method	Round	Time	Notes
Middleweight 84 kg	(Switzerland) Yasubey Enomoto	def.	(Russia) Stanislav Molodtsov	Decision (Unanimous)	3	5:00	
Lightweight 70 kg	(Azerbaijan) Nariman Abbasov	def.	(Russia) Islam Begidov	Decision (Unanimous)	3	5:00	Lightweight Grand Prix Semi-Finals
Welterweight 77 kg	(Russia) Magomed Nurov	def.	(Russia) Grigoriy Kichigin	KO (Head Kick)	2	0:36	Welterweight Grand Prix Quarter-Finals
Middleweight 84 kg	(Russia) Sergey Kalinin	def.	(Belarus) Pavel Katrunov	Decision (Split)	3	5:00	Middleweight Grand Prix Quarter-Finals
Middleweight 84 kg	(Russia) Khalid Murtazaliev	def.	(Brazil) Edilson França	TKO (Punches)	1	4:49	Middleweight Grand Prix Quarter-Finals
Featherweight 66 kg	(Russia) Movlid Khaybulaev	def.	(Azerbaijan) Vugar Bahshiev	TKO (Elbows)	3	3:47	Featherweight Grand Prix Quarter-Finals
Catchweight 73 kg	(Afghanistan) Ahmed Wali Hotak	def.	(Russia) Yuriy Ryaboy	Decision (Unanimous)	3	5:00	

== Fight Nights Global 49: Stoyan vs. Škondrič ==
FNG 49: Stoyan vs. Škondrič
- Promotion: Fight Nights Global
- Date: June 4, 2016
- Venue: Banská Bystrica Ice Stadium
- City: Banská Bystrica, Slovakia

Fight Nights Global 49: Stoyan vs. Škondrič was a mixed martial arts event held by Fight Nights Global on June 4, 2016 at the Banská Bystrica Ice Stadium in Banská Bystrica, Slovakia.

=== Results ===
Fight Card
Weight Class				Method	Round	Time	Notes
Heavyweight 120 kg	(Russia) Alexey Stoyan	def.	(Slovakia) Ilja Škondrič	TKO (Punches)	1	0:15	
Lightweight 70 kg	(Russia) Gazavat Suleymanov	def.	(Slovakia) Miroslav Štrbák	KO (Punch)	1	3:44	
Catchweight 73 kg	(Russia) Dinislam Kamavov	def.	(Czech Republic) Jaroslav Poborský	TKO (Punches)	1	2:18	
Featherweight 66 kg	(Russia) Roman Silagadze	def.	(Spain) Alfonso Perez	TKO (Punches)	1	2:33	Featherweight Grand Prix Quarter-Finals
Welterweight 77 kg	(Czech Republic) David Kozma	def.	(Slovakia) Emin Sefa	Decision (Unanimous)	3	5:00	
Featherweight 66 kg	(Czech Republic) Vít Mrákota	def.	(Slovakia) Michal Těššík	TKO (Punches)	1	3:52	
Heavyweight 120 kg	(Slovakia) Kristof Nataska	def.	(Czech Republic) Martin Chuděj	Decision (Unanimous)	3	5:00	
Middleweight 84 kg	(Slovakia) Jozef Wittner	def.	(Czech Republic) Petr Cajnak	Submission (Guillotine Choke)	1	3:11	
Catchweight 59 kg	(Czech Republic) David Dvořák	def.	(Slovakia) Miroslav Kubáň	TKO (Doctor Stoppage)	2	2:41	
Light Heavyweight 93 kg	(Slovakia) Tomáš Bolo	def.	(Slovakia) Roman Vančo	Submission (Armbar)	1	1:13	

== Fight Nights Global 50: Fedor vs. Maldonado ==
FNG 50: Fedor vs. Maldonado
- Promotion: Fight Nights Global
- Date: June 17, 2016
- Venue: Sibur Arena
- City: Saint Petersburg, Russia

Fight Nights Global 50: Fedor vs. Maldonado was a mixed martial arts event held by Fight Nights Global on June 17, 2016 at the Sibur Arena in Saint Petersburg, Russia.

=== Results ===
Fight Card
Weight Class				Method	Round	Time	Notes
Heavyweight 120 kg	(Russia) Fedor Emelianenko	def.	(Brazil) Fábio Maldonado	Decision (Majority)	3	5:00	
Heavyweight 120 kg	(Russia) Vitaly Minakov	def.	(Australia) Peter Graham	Submission (Armbar)	1	1:02	
Heavyweight 120 kg	(Russia) Kirill Sidelnikov	def.	(Austria) Ruben Wolf	Decision (Unanimous)	3	5:00	
Catchweight 72 kg	(Russia) Akhmet Aliev	def.	(Croatia) Matej Truhan	Decision (Unanimous)	3	5:00	
Catchweight 87 kg	(Russia) Anatoly Tokov	def.	(Serbia) Vladimir Filipović	Decision (Unanimous)	3	5:00	
Heavyweight 120 kg	(Russia) Sergei Pavlovich	def.	(France) Chaban Ka	TKO (Punches)	1	1:54	
Light Heavyweight 93 kg	(Russia) Vadim Nemkov	def.	(Poland) Mikołaj Różanski	TKO (Punches)	1	3:39	
Featherweight 66 kg	(Russia) Rasul Mirzaev	def.	(Brazil) Dioginis Souza	TKO (Punches)	1	4:13	
Heavyweight 120 kg	(Ukraine) Valentin Moldavsky	def.	(Germany) Daniel Dörrer	Submission (Guillotine Choke)	1	0:47	
Welterweight 120 kg	(Russia) Georgiy Kichigin	def.	(Russia) Vladimir Tyurin	Submission (Armbar)	1	2:03	Welterweight Grand Prix Semi-Finals

== Fight Nights Global: Summer Cup 2016 ==
Fight Nights Global: Summer Cup 2016
- Promotion: Fight Nights Global
- Date: August 27, 2016
- Venue: Black Sea Arena
- City: (Georgia (country)) Ureki, Georgia

Fight Nights Global: Summer Cup 2016 was a mixed martial arts event held by Fight Nights Global on August 27, 2016 at the Black Sea Arena in Ureki, Georgia.

=== Results ===
Fight Card
Weight Class				Method	Round	Time	Notes
Catchweight 75 kg	(Armenia) David Khachatryan	def.	(Australia) Wilhelm Ott	Decision (Unanimous)	3	5:00	
Catchweight 69 kg	(Georgia (country)) Paata Robakidze	def.	(Kazakhstan) Sirozhiddin Eshanbaev	Submission (Rear-Naked Choke)	2	1:57	
Middleweight 84 kg	(Georgia (country)) Georgi Lobzhanidze	def.	(Colombia) D. Jaimes Otalora	TKO (Punches)	1	4:13	
Bantamweight 61 kg	(Georgia (country)) Ibragim Navruzov	def.	(Kazakhstan) Altynbek Bazhimov	TKO (Head Kick and Punches)	1	4:58	
Catchweight 80 kg	(Russia) Samir Abdulaev	def.	(Georgia (country)) Zaza Kindzodze	Submission (Triangle Choke)	1	1:22	
Lightweight 70 kg	(Russia) Nikolay Kaushansky	def.	(Russia) Artem Lobanov	Submission (Rear-Naked Choke)	1	4:32	
Lightweight 70 kg	(Georgia (country)) Tazo Bochorishvili	def.	(Moldova) Aleksey Sirkhan	Submission (Armbar)	1	1:16	

== Fight Nights Global 51: Pavlovich vs. Gelegaev ==
FNG 51: Pavlovich vs. Gelegaev
- Promotion: Fight Nights Global
- Date: September 25, 2016
- Venue: Ali Aliev Sports Palace
- City: Kaspiysk, Russia

Fight Nights Global 51: Pavlovich vs. Gelegaev was a mixed martial arts event held by Fight Nights Global on September 25, 2016 at the Ali Aliev Sports Palace in Kaspiysk, Russia.

=== Results ===
Fight Card
Weight Class				Method	Round	Time	Notes
Heavyweight 120 kg	(Russia) Sergei Pavlovich	def.	(Russia) Magomed Gelegaev	TKO (Knee and Punches)	1	3:35	
Featherweight 66 kg	(Russia) Rasul Mirzaev	def.	(Brazil) Diego Nunes	TKO (Punches)	1	1:45	
Catchweight 73 kg	(Russia) Akhmet Aliev	def.	(Russia) Vener Galiev	Decision (Unanimous)	3	5:00	
Lightweight 70 kg	(Russia) Murad Machaev	def.	(England) Jack McGann	Submission (Bulldog Choke)	2	4:48	
Light Heavyweight 93 kg	(Russia) Shamil Akhmedov	def.	(Ukraine) Vasily Babich	Decision (Unanimous)	3	5:00	
Catchweight 68 kg	(Russia) Gadzhi Rabadanov	def.	(Russia) Ruslan Yamanbaev	Submission (Rear-Naked Choke)	2	1:49	
Catchweight 80 kg	(Russia) Raimond Magomedaliev	def.	(Russia) Ruslan Zhemukhov	TKO (Punches and Elbows)	2	2:16	
Welterweight 77 kg	(Russia) Saigid Izagahmayev	def.	(Romania) Aurel Pîrtea	Submission (Armbar)	3	0:42	
Middleweight 84 kg	(Russia) Abusupyan Alikhanov	def.	(Russia) Dmitry Samoilov	Decision (Unanimous)	3	5:00	Middleweight Grand Prix Quarter-Finals

== Fight Nights Global 52: Mokhnatkin vs. Maldonado ==
FNG 52: Mokhnatkin vs. Maldonado
- Promotion: Fight Nights Global
- Date: October 1, 2016
- Venue: Yubileyny Sports Palace
- City: Nizhnevartovsk, Russia

Fight Nights Global 52: Mokhnatkin vs. Maldonado was a mixed martial arts event held by Fight Nights Global on October 1, 2016 at the Yubileyny Sports Palace in Nizhnevartovsk, Russia.

=== Results ===
Fight Card
Weight Class				Method	Round	Time	Notes
Heavyweight 120 kg	(Russia) Mikhail Mokhnatkin	def.	(Brazil) Fábio Maldonado	Decision (Unanimous)	3	5:00	
Middleweight 84 kg	(Russia) Stanislav Molodtsov	def.	(Georgia (country)) Georgi Lobzhanidze	TKO (Punches)	3	3:18	Middleweight Grand Prix Quarter-Finals
Featherweight 66 kg	(Russia) Ilya Kurzanov	def.	(Russia) Alexander Matmuratov	Decision (Majority)	3	5:00	Featherweight Grand Prix Quarter-Finals
Lightweight 70 kg	(Russia) Robert Sharafutdinov	def.	(Russia) Valeriy Mitrichuk	TKO (Punches)	1	2:38	
Heavyweight 120 kg	(Russia) Rashid Sirazhudinov	def.	(Russia) Roman Goncharuk	TKO (Punches)	1	0:57	
Light Heavyweight 93 kg	(Russia) Zalimkhan Magomedaliev	def.	(Russia) Denis Semenov	TKO (Punches)	3	1:57	
Catchweight 63 kg	(Russia) Muslim Ibragimov	def.	(Russia) Ramazan Gadzhikhanov	Decision (Split)	3	5:00	

== Fight Nights Global 53: Day 1 - Gimbatov vs. Shokalo ==
FNG 53: Day 1 - Gimbatov vs. Shokalo
- Promotion: Fight Nights Global
- Date: October 7, 2016
- Venue: Luzhniki Palace of Sports
- City: Moscow, Russia

Fight Nights Global 53: Day 1 - Gimbatov vs. Shokalo was a mixed martial arts event held by Fight Nights Global on October 7, 2016 at the Luzhniki Palace of Sports in Moscow, Russia.

=== Results ===
Fight Card
Weight Class				Method	Round	Time	Notes
Middleweight 84 kg	(Russia) Ayub Gimbatov	def.	(Ukraine) Artem Shokalo	Submission (Armbar)	1	3:35	
Bantamweight 61 kg	(Slovakia) Tomáš Deák	def.	(Russia) Vadim Buseev	Decision (Unanimous)	3	5:00	
Catchweight 100 kg	(Russia) Abdurakhman Bilarov	def.	(Russia) Vyacheslav Ilin	Submission (Guillotine Choke)	1	2:19	Grappling Bout
Welterweight 77 kg	(Russia) G. Khiramagomedov	def.	(Russia) Yuri Izotov	Decision (Unanimous)	3	5:00	
Middleweight 84 kg	(Russia) Aigun Akhmedov	def.	(Ukraine) Vasily Novikov	TKO (Punches)	1	3:54	
Heavyweight 120 kg	(Russia) Ali Isaev	def.	(Russia) Mikhail Kabargin	Decision (Unanimous)	3	5:00	
Bantamweight 61 kg	(Russia) Aleksandr Yanyshev	def.	(Russia) Artur Magomedov	Decision (Split)	3	5:00	

== Fight Nights Global 53: Day 2 - Mineev vs. Enomoto ==
FNG 53: Day 2 - Mineev vs. Enomoto
- Promotion: Fight Nights Global
- Date: October 8, 2016
- Venue: Luzhniki Palace of Sports
- City: Moscow, Russia

Fight Nights Global 53: Day 2 - Mineev vs. Enomoto was a mixed martial arts event held by Fight Nights Global on October 8, 2016 at the Luzhniki Palace of Sports in Moscow, Russia.

=== Results ===
Fight Card
Weight Class				Method	Round	Time	Notes
Middleweight 82 kg	(Russia) Vladimir Mineev	def.	(Switzerland) Yasubey Enomoto	Decision (Unanimous)	3	5:00	
Welterweight 77 kg	(Russia) Magomed Nurov	def.	(Ukraine) Konstantin Linnik	TKO (Elbows)	1	4:30	Welterweight Grand Prix Semi-Finals
Lightweight 70 kg	(Russia) Magomedsaygid Alibekov	def.	(Croatia) Matej Truhan	Submission (Rear Naked Choke)	2	2:56	Lightweight Grand Prix Semi-Finals
Featherweight 66 kg	(Russia) Movlid Khaybulaev	def.	(Georgia (country)) Paata Robakidze	Submission (Guillotine Choke)	1	1:12	Featherweight Grand Prix Semi-Finals
Flyweight 57 kg	(Russia) Vartan Asatryan	def.	(Finland) Mikael Silander	Submission (Guillotine Choke)	2	4:05	Flyweight Grand Prix Quarter-Finals
Flyweight 57 kg	(Azerbaijan) Elnar Ibragimov	def.	(Lithuania) Oleg Lichkovakha	Decision (Unanimous)	3	5:00	Flyweight Grand Prix Quarter-Finals
Welterweight 77 kg	(Russia) Aliaskhab Khizriev	def.	(Ukraine) Sergiy Kobchik	TKO (Punches)	1	3:52	

== Fight Nights Global 54: Pavlovich vs. Kudin ==
FNG 54: Pavlovich vs. Kudin
- Promotion: Fight Nights Global
- Date: November 16, 2016
- Venue: KSK Express
- City: Rostov-on-Don, Russia

Fight Nights Global 54: Pavlovich vs. Kudin was a mixed martial arts event held by Fight Nights Global on November 16, 2016 at the KSK Express in Rostov-on-Don, Russia.

=== Results ===
Fight Card
Weight Class				Method	Round	Time	Notes
Heavyweight 120 kg	(Russia) Sergei Pavlovich	def.	(Belarus) Alexei Kudin	Decision (Unanimous)	3	5:00	Heavyweight Grand Prix Semi-Finals
Featherweight 66 kg	(Georgia (country)) Levan Makashvili	def.	(Russia) Rasul Mirzaev	Decision (Unanimous)	3	5:00	
Catchweight 73 kg	(Armenia) David Khachatryan	def.	(Ukraine) Anatoly Safronov	Decision (Unanimous)	3	5:00	
Middleweight 84 kg	(Russia) Khalid Murtazaliev	def.	(Russia) Sergey Kalinin	TKO (Kick to the Body and Punches)	1	3:20	Middleweight Grand Prix Semi-Finals
Lightweight 70 kg	(Russia) Nikolay Gaponov	def.	(Russia) Islam Begidov	TKO (Knee and Punches)	1	2:31	
Catchweight 100 kg	(Russia) Yusup Suleymanov	def.	(Russia) Oleg Popov	Decision (Unanimous)	3	5:00	
Catchweight 59 kg	(Russia) Tagir Ulanbekov	def.	(Kazakhstan) Shyngys Kairanov	Decision (Unanimous)	3	5:00	

== Fight Nights Global 55: McGann vs. Egorov ==
FNG 55: McGann vs. Egorov
- Promotion: Fight Nights Global
- Date: November 22, 2016
- Venue: Crocus City Hall
- City: Moscow, Russia

Fight Nights Global 55: McGann vs. Egorov was a mixed martial arts event held by Fight Nights Global on November 22, 2016 at the Crocus City Hall in Moscow, Russia.

=== Results ===
Fight Card
Weight Class				Method	Round	Time	Notes
Lightweight 70 kg	(England) Jack McGann	def.	(Russia) Igor Egorov	KO (Punch)	2	0:52	
Featherweight 66 kg	(Russia) Ilya Kurzanov	def.	(Russia) Akhmed Balkizov	Submission (Triangle Choke)	2	3:26	Featherweight Grand Prix Semi-Finals
Middleweight 84 kg	(Russia) Magomed Abdulvagabov	def.	(Russia) Rustam Chsiev	Decision (Unanimous)	3	5:00	
Lightweight 70 kg	(Russia) Abdulla Dadaev	def.	(Ukraine) Andrey Mitrofanov	Submission (Guillotine Choke)	1	0:51	
Middleweight 84 kg	(Russia) Dmitry Aryshev	def.	(Tajikistan) Soleh Khasanov	TKO (Corner Stoppage)	3	2:57	
Bantamweight 61 kg	(Russia) Grachik Engibaryan	def.	(Russia) Artem Lobanov	Submission (Armbar)	1	2:40	
Flyweight 57 kg	(Kazakhstan) Zhalgas Zhumagulov	def.	(Ukraine) Ivan Andrushchenko	Decision (Unanimous)	3	5:00	

== Fight Nights Global 56: Falcão vs. Mineev ==
FNG 56: Falcão vs. Mineev
- Promotion: Fight Nights Global
- Date: December 9, 2016
- Venue: Fetisov Arena
- City: Vladivostok, Russia

Fight Nights Global 56: Falcão vs. Mineev was a mixed martial arts event held by Fight Nights Global on December 9, 2016 at the Fetisov Arena in Vladivostok, Russia.

=== Results ===
Fight Card
Weight Class				Method	Round	Time	Notes
Middleweight 84 kg	(Brazil) Maiquel Falcão	def.	(Russia) Vladimir Mineev	Decision (Majority)	3	5:00	
Lightweight 70 kg	(Russia) Magomedsaygid Alibekov	def.	(Azerbaijan) Nariman Abbasov	Decision (Unanimous)	3	5:00	For the inaugural Fight Nights Lightweight Championship
Middleweight 84 kg	(Russia) Evgeny Shalomaev	def.	(Russia) David Gladun	Decision (Unanimous)	3	5:00	
Catchweight 72 kg	(Russia) Dmitriy Gorobets	def.	(Ukraine) Shamil Magomedov	Decision (Unanimous)	3	5:00	
Heavyweight 120 kg	(Russia) Amirkhan Isagadzhiev	def.	(Russia) Georgy Sakaev	TKO (Punches)	1	1:26	
Light Heavyweight 93 kg	(Russia) Magomed Shakhrudinov	def.	(Russia) Magomedkhan Yarogiev	Decision (Unanimous)	2	5:00	
Middleweight 84 kg	(Russia) Shamil Abdulaev	def.	(Russia) Murad Abdulbekov	Decision (Unanimous)	2	5:00	
Welterweight 77 kg	(Russia) Alibek Rasulov	def.	(Russia) Yunus Akhmedov	TKO (Punches)	2	N/A	

=== Fight Nights Global Lightweight Grand-Prix bracket ===
Quarter-Finals
(Azerbaijan) Nariman Abbasov	DEC
(Russia) Nikolay Gaponov	3-0
(Russia) Islam Begidov	DEC
(Russia) Denis Izmodenov	2-1
(Russia) Igor Egorov	TKO
(Belarus) Eduard Muravitskiy	1r.
(Russia) Magomedsaygid Alibekov	DEC
(Russia) Daniil Voevodin	3-0

Semi-Finals
(Azerbaijan) Nariman Abbasov	DEC
(Russia) Islam Begidov	3-0
(Croatia) Matej Truhan	2r.
(Russia) Magomedsaygid Alibekov	SUB

Final
(Azerbaijan) Nariman Abbasov	0-3
(Russia) Magomedsaygid Alibekov	DEC

== Fight Nights Global 57: Sidelnikov vs. Agaev ==
FNG 57: Sidelnikov vs. Agaev
- Promotion: Fight Nights Global
- Date: December 16, 2016
- Venue: Krylatskoye Sports Palace
- City: Moscow, Russia

Event chronology
Fight Nights Global 56	FNG 57: Sidelnikov vs. Agaev	Fight Nights Global 58

Fight Nights Global 57: Sidelnikov vs. Agaev was a mixed martial arts event held by Fight Nights Global on December 1, 2016 at the Krylatskoye Sports Palace in Moscow, Russia.

=== Results ===
Fight Card
Weight Class				Method	Round	Time	Notes
Heavyweight 120 kg	(Russia) Kirill Sidelnikov	def.	(Russia) Baga Agaev	Decision (Unanimous)	3	5:00	Heavyweight Grand Prix Semi-Finals
Welterweight 77 kg	(Russia) Saigid Izagahmayev	def.	(Russia) Nikolay Aleksakhin	Decision (Unanimous)	3	5:00	
Lightweight 70 kg	(Kazakhstan) Kuat Khamitov	def.	(Russia) Gadzhi Rabadanov	Submission (Arm-Triangle Choke)	3	3:47	
Welterweight 77 kg	(Russia) Gennadiy Kovalev	def.	(Russia) Alexei Ivanov	Submission (Guillotine Choke)	1	1:52	
Light Heavyweight 93 kg	(Tajikistan) Abdul-Khamid Davlatov	def.	(Russia) Denis Semenov	TKO (Elbows)	1	1:17	
Catchweight 88 kg	(Russia) Abusupyan Alikhanov	def.	(Russia) Rustam Abdurapov	TKO (Punches)	1	1:35	
Bantamweight 61 kg	(Russia) Nikita Chistyakov	def.	(Kazakhstan) Zhuman Zhumabekov	Submission (Heel Hook)	1	2:46	
Bantamweight 61 kg	(Russia) Umar Nurmagomedov	def.	(Russia) Rishat Kharisov	Submission (Peruvian Necktie)	2	3:28	
