= 2010 in Fight Nights Global =

Information
- First date: June 5, 2010
- Last date: October 15, 2010

Events
- Total events: 2

Fights

Chronology
2010 in Fight Nights Global	2011 in Fight Nights Global

The year 2010 was the first year in the history of the Fight Nights Global, a mixed martial arts and kickboxing promotion based in Russia. It started broadcasting through a television agreement with REN TV.

== List of events ==
#	Event Title	Date	Arena	Location
1	Fight Nights: Battle of Moscow 1	June 5, 2010	Crocus City Hall	Moscow, Russia
2	Fight Nights: Battle of Moscow 2	October 15, 2010	Crocus City Hall	Moscow, Russia

== Fight Nights: Battle of Moscow 1 ==
Fight Nights: Battle of Moscow 1
- Promotion: Fight Nights Global
- Date: June 5, 2010
- Venue: Crocus City Hall
- City: Moscow, Russia

Event chronology
Fight Nights: Battle of Moscow 1	Fight Nights: Battle of Moscow 2

Fight Nights: Battle of Moscow 1 was a mixed martial arts and kickboxing event held by Fight Nights Global on June 5, 2010, at the Crocus City Hall in Moscow, Russia.

=== Background ===
This event featured a kickboxing world title fights for the WAKO 72 kg Championship between Batu Khasikov and Ricardo Fernandes as headliner. Also this event featured 4-Man Lightweight Tournament.

=== Result ===
Fight Card
Weight Class				Method	Round	Time	Notes
Kickboxing 72 kg	(Russia) Batu Khasikov	def.	(Portugal) Ricardo Fernandes	TKO (Retire)	3	2:16	
MMA Lightweight 70 kg	(Russia) Murad Machaev	def.	(Russia) Zubaira Tukhugov	Submission (Rear-Naked Choke)	1	1:17	Tournament Final
Kickboxing 77 kg	(Russia) Sergei Zimnevich	def.	(Azerbaijan) Rafael Aliev	Decision (Unanimous)	3	3:00	
MMA Lightweight 70 kg	(Russia) Zubaira Tukhugov	def.	(Russia) Danil Turinghe	TKO (Punches)	1	1:26	Tournament Semi-Finals
MMA Lightweight 70 kg	(Russia) Murad Machaev	def.	(Russia) Rasul Abdulaev	Decision (Unanimous)	2	5:00	Tournament Semi-Finals
MMA Bantamweight 61 kg	(Russia) Rasul Mirzaev	def.	(Russia) Marat Pekov	Decision (Unanimous)	3	5:00	

=== MMA Lightweight 70 kg Tournament bracket ===
Semi-finals
(Russia) Murad Machaev	DEC
(Russia) Rasul Abdulaev	2r.
(Russia) Zubaira Tukhugov	TKO
(Russia) Danil Turinghe	1r.

Final
(Russia) Murad Machaev	SUB
(Russia) Zubaira Tukhugov	1r.

== Fight Nights: Battle of Moscow 2 ==
Fight Nights: Battle of Moscow 2
- Promotion: Fight Nights Global
- Date: October 15, 2010
- Venue: Crocus City Hall
- City: Moscow, Russia

Event chronology
Fight Nights: Battle of Moscow 1	Fight Nights: Battle of Moscow 2	Fight Nights: Battle of Moscow 3

Fight Nights: Battle of Moscow 2 was a mixed martial arts and kickboxing event held by Fight Nights Global on October 15, 2010, at the Crocus City Hall in Moscow, Russia.

=== Result ===
Fight Card
Weight Class				Method	Round	Time	Notes
Kickboxing 63.5 kg	(Russia) Sergey Lipinets	def.	(Ukraine) Roman Mailov	KO (Punch)	2	1:43	Tournament Final
MMA Welterweight 77 kg	(Russia) Shamil Zavurov	def.	(Russia) Vener Galiev	Decision (Unanimous)	2	5:00	Tournament Final
MMA Welterweight 77 kg	(Russia) Vasiliy Tsarkov	def.	(Russia) Roman Markovic	Decision (Unanimous)	2	5:00	
MMA Welterweight 77 kg	(Russia) Ivan Kosov	def.	(Ukraine) Evgeni Fomenko	Decision (Unanimous)	2	5:00	
Kickboxing 63.5 kg	(Ukraine) Roman Mailov	def.	(Ukraine) Bogdan Luckin	TKO (Retire)	3	3:00	Tournament Semi-Finals
Kickboxing 63.5 kg	(Russia) Sergey Lipinets	def.	(Turkey) Fikri Arican	TKO (Punches)	2	2:18	Tournament Semi-Finals
MMA Welterweight 77 kg	(Russia) Shamil Zavurov	def.	(Ukraine) Vasily Novikov	Submission (Rear-Naked Choke)	1	2:53	Tournament Semi-Finals
MMA Welterweight 77 kg	(Russia) Vener Galiev	def.	(Tajikistan) Artur Odilbekov	Submission (Armbar)	1	1:19	Tournament Semi-Finals

=== Kickboxing 63.5 kg Tournament bracket ===
Semi-finals
(Russia) Sergey Lipinets	TKO
(Turkey) Fikri Arican	2r.
(Ukraine) Roman Mailov	TKO
(Ukraine) Bogdan Luckin	3r.

Final
(Russia) Sergey Lipinets	KO
(Ukraine) Roman Mailov	2r.

=== MMA Welterweight 77 kg Tournament bracket ===
Semi-finals
(Russia) Shamil Zavurov	SUB
(Ukraine) Vasily Novikov	1r.
(Russia) Vener Galiev	SUB
(Tajikistan) Artur Odilbekov	1r.

Final
(Russia) Shamil Zavurov	DEC
(Russia) Vener Galiev	2r.
