= Rasul Mirzaev =

Russian martial artist

Rasul Mirzaev Расул Мирзаев
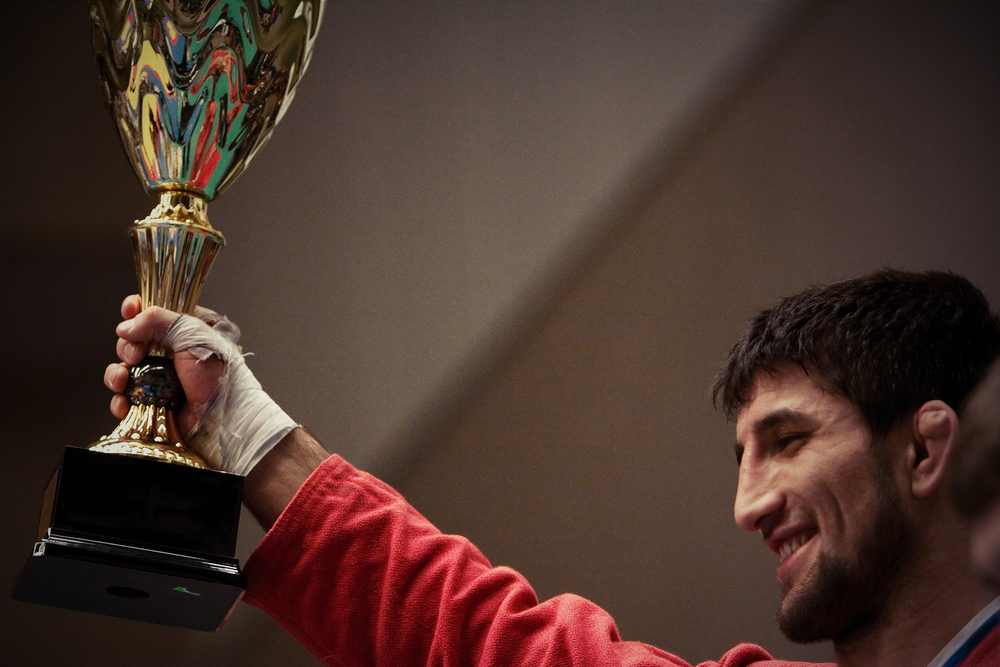
- Mirzaev in 2011
- Born: Rasul Rabadanovich Mirzaev; 30 March 1986 (age 40); Kizlyar, Dagestan ASSR, Soviet Union
- Nickname: Black Tiger
- Height: 5 ft 7 in (170 cm)
- Weight: 145 lb (66 kg; 10 st 5 lb)
- Division: Featherweight
- Reach: 68 in (173 cm)
- Style: Combat Sambo
- Fighting out of: Moscow, Russia
- Rank: International Master of Sports in Combat Sambo
- Years active: 2009–present

Mixed martial arts record
- Total: 23
- Wins: 19
- By knockout: 11
- By submission: 4
- By decision: 4
- Losses: 4
- By knockout: 3
- By decision: 1

Other information
- Mixed martial arts record from Sherdog

Rasul Mirzaev
Medal record

Representing Russia

Men's Combat Sambo

World Championships
Gold medal – first place	2010 Tashkent	62 kg

Rasul Rabadanovich Mirzaev (Russian: Расу́л Рабада́нович Мирза́ев, born 30 March 1986) is an Avar-Dargin mixed martial artist born in Russia.

== Sports career and MMA ==
Mirzaev began training at the Moscow-based Sambo-70 sports club in 2007. In November 2010, Mirzaev won first place at the combat sambo division of the World Sambo Championships that was held in Tashkent, Uzbekistan, submitting his opponent Baasankhun Damlanpurev from Mongolia in thirty seconds. In the same year, the Moscow Sambo Federation awarded Mirzaev with the Best Athlete of the Year in combat sambo.

Mirzaev is undefeated in his mixed martial arts career. His record currently stands at fourteen wins and no losses. His first win was in October 2009 at the Battle of Champions in Elista, in a duel with Danil Turinghe. In June 2010, he defeated Marat Pekov at Fight Nights – Battle of Moscow 1. In March 2010, Mirzayev defeated Evgeni Khavilov at Battle of Moscow 3. In May of that year, he won a fight with Roman Kishev at United Glory 14: 2010–2011 World Series Finals. After a near 2-year gap in his MMA career due to his criminal case, he made his return in March 2013 and has since won nine straight fights. In July 2011, Mirzaev fought for the Euro-Asia Featherweight Championship title in the Fight Nights – Battle of Moscow 4 event. The Japanese MMA Super Star Masanori Kanehara lost to Mirzaev by technical knockout in less than two minutes.

On 16 November 2016 he lost first time in MMA career to UFC veteran Levan Makashvili at Fight Nights 54 via unanimous decision.

Mirzaev faced Abdul-Rakhman Dudaev at ACA 138 on March 27, 2022. He lost the bout after being knocked out in the first round.

== Criminal investigation and Assassination attempt ==
According to the Moscow police, a disagreement between Mirzaev and a 19-year-old Ivan Agafonov took place on 13 August 2011 at 4 a.m., in the center of Moscow near a night club. Mirzaev punched Agafonov down to the pavement. Agafonov died in a hospital four days later. The Agafonov family agreed with the experts, who say the cause of the young man's death was not a punch from Mirzaev, but the head trauma he sustained from falling on the pavement.

After the death of Agafonov, his mother said that doctors failed to provide her son with necessary help. The Moscow Department of Health set up a commission composed of several neurosurgeons. They studied the actions of their colleagues and concluded that physicians who provided first aid to Agafonov indeed made some mistakes, but none of them were fatal. "All the shortcomings were of a formal nature," – the experts said. – "Help to the victim was rendered in full. And to anticipate the development of Agafonov's trauma was not possible."

Although, originally charged with murder, Mirzaev was convicted on 27 November 2012, of negligent manslaughter and released by the court, his 15 months on remand having been taken into account.

On the 1st January 2017 The Russian fighter was shot three times with a high-powered BB gun, including once in the face, beat with a baseball bat and choked with chains in Moscow. He was later rushed to hospital, where he was in a stable condition after surgery to remove the bullets and he survived.

== Mixed martial arts record ==
Professional record breakdown
23 matches	19 wins	4 losses
By knockout	11	3
By submission	4	0
By decision	4	1

Res.	Record	Opponent	Method	Event	Date	Round	Time	Location	Notes
Win	18–5	Umar Magomedov	TKO (punches)	Nashe Delo: Oliveira vs. Grozin	May 25, 2024	2	2:51	Sochi, Russia	Catchweight (151 lb) bout.
Loss	18–4	Abdul-Rakhman Dudaev	KO (punch)	ACA 138: Vagaev vs Gadzhidaudov	26 March 2022	1	4:06	Grozny, Russia	
Loss	18–3	Arman Ospanov	TKO (punches)	ACA 105: Shakhbulatov vs. Oliveira	6 March 2020	1	2:29	Almaty, Kazakhstan	
Loss	18–2	Shamil Shakhbulatov	KO (punch)	ACA 99: Bagov vs. Khaliev	27 September 2019	1	3:57	Moscow, Russia	
Win	18–1	Gleristone Santos	KO (punch)	ACB 90: Vakhaev vs Bilostenniy	10 November 2018	2	4:03	Moscow, Russia	
Loss	17–1	Levan Makashvili	Decision (unanimous)	Fight Nights Global 54: Pavlovich vs. Kudin	16 November 2016	3	5:00	Rostov On Don, Russia	
Win	17–0	Diego Nunes	TKO (punches)	Fight Nights Global 51: Pavlovich vs. Gelegaev	25 September 2016	1	1:45	Kaspiysk, Dagestan, Russia	
Win	16–0	Dioginis Souza	TKO (punches)	Fight Nights Global 50: Fedor vs. Maldonado	17 June 2016	1	4:13	Saint Petersburg, Russia	
Win	15–0	LiGe Teng	TKO (punches)	Oriental MMA Summit 2016	21 January 2016	1	4:50	Shandong, China	
Win	14–0	Ilya Kurzanov	Decision (unanimous)	Fight Nights Moscow	11 December 2015	3	5:00	Moscow, Russia	
Win	13–0	Kevin Croom	TKO (punches)	Fight Nights Dagestan	25 September 2015	2	3:16	Kaspiysk, Dagestan, Russia	
Win	12–0	Ronny Gomez	Submission (rear-naked choke)	Fight Nights: Sochi	31 July 2015	1	2:46	Sochi, Russia	
Win	11–0	Sebastian Romanowski	TKO (punches)	Fight Nights: Battle of Moscow 19	11 June 2015	3	2:30	Moscow, Russia	
Win	10–0	Jose Tavares	TKO (punches)	Battle of the Stars 3	6 December 2014	1	3:40	Kaspiysk, Russia	
Win	9–0	Yerzhan Estanov	TKO (retirement)	Alash Pride: Warriors of the Steppe	23 November 2014	2	5:00	Almaty, Kazakhstan	
Win	8–0	Magomedemin Khazhgeriev	Submission (armbar)	N1 Pro: Nomad Pro MMA Cup 2014	5 October 2014	1	N/A	Grozny, Chechnya, Russia	
Win	7–0	James Saville	Decision (unanimous)	Dare Fight Sports – Rebels of MMA	12 October 2013	3	5:00	Bangkok, Thailand	
Win	6–0	Yerzhan Estanov	Decision (unanimous)	Great Battle	30 March 2013	3	5:00	Almaty, Kazakhstan	
Win	5–0	Masanori Kanehara	TKO (punches)	Fight Nights: Battle of Moscow 4	7 July 2011	1	1:47	Moscow, Russia	
Win	4–0	Roman Kishev	Submission (armbar)	United Glory 14: World Series Finals	28 May 2011	1	3:10	Moscow, Russia	
Win	3–0	Evgeni Khavilov	KO (punch)	Fight Nights: Battle of Moscow 3	12 March 2011	1	1:02	Moscow, Russia	
Win	2–0	Marat Pekov	Decision (unanimous)	Fight Nights: Battle of Moscow 1	5 June 2010	3	5:00	Moscow, Russia	
Win	1–0	Danila Turinghe	Submission (armbar)	Battle of Champions – Elista	2 October 2009	2	4:55	Elista, Russia	
