= Ureki =

Ureki ურეკი
- Town
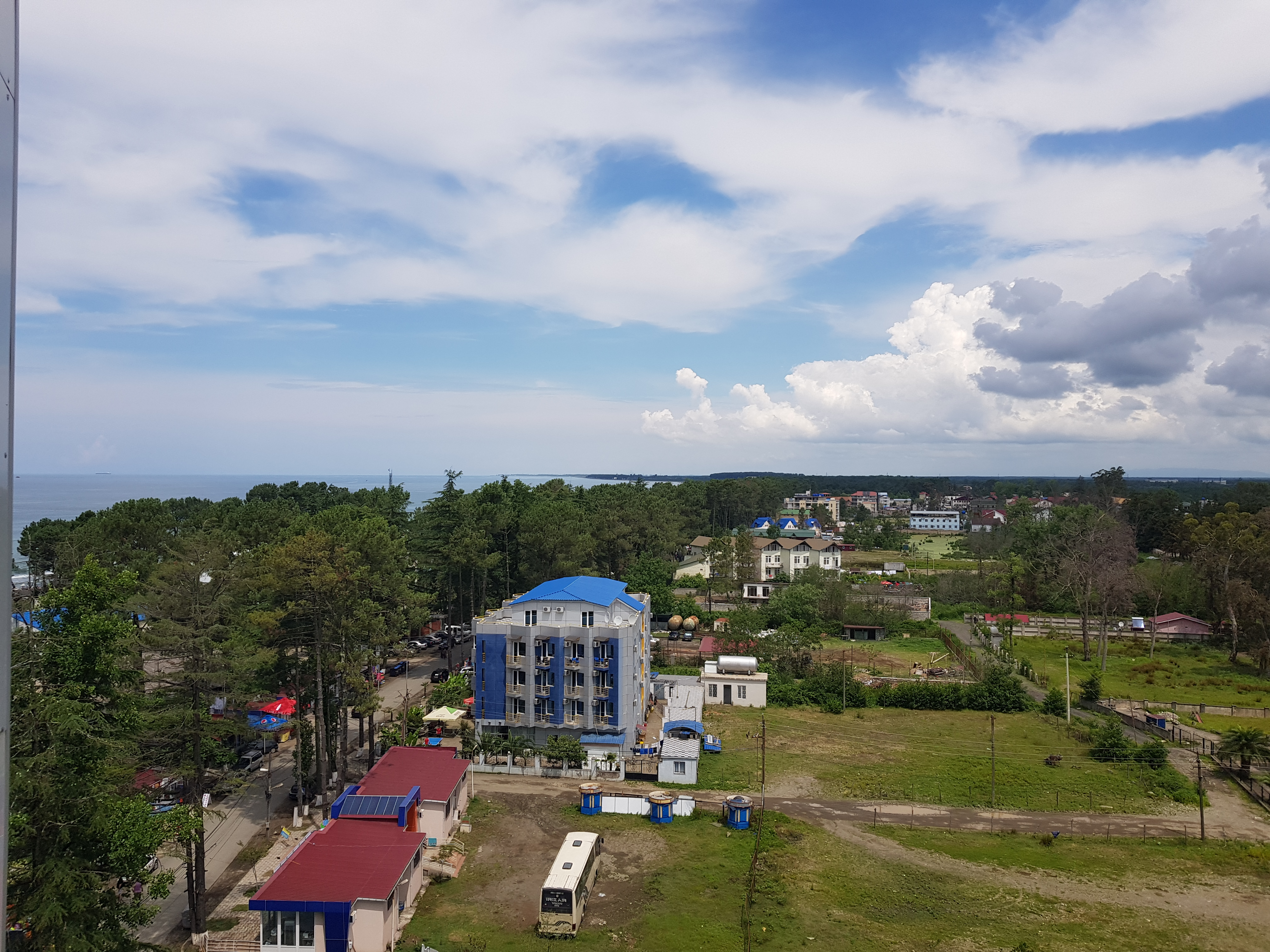
- Sunset on the coast of Ureki

- Location of Ureki in Georgia Ureki (Guria)
- Coordinates: 41°59′49″N 41°46′41″E
- Country: Georgia
- Region: Guria
- District: Ozurgeti
- Elevation: 4 m (13 ft)

Population (2014)
  - Total: 1,166
- Time zone: UTC+4
- Area code: +995

Ureki (Georgian: ურეკი) is a town and a seaside climatic resort on the Black Sea coast of Georgia. Located within Ozurgeti District in the region of Guria, Ureki is 60 kilometers north of Batumi and approximately 300 km west of the nation's capital Tbilisi. It is located 4 meters above the sea level and has a population of 1,166 (2014 all-Georgia Census). It received a status of a town in 1953.

Unlike many areas on the Black Sea, in Ureki beaches are sandy, rather than covered in pebbles. The sand in Ureki is classified as black sand and has magnetic properties, which some believe treat a number of health problems, including cardiovascular diseases.

The whole area was covered by forest once and it was impossible to hunt there, this is why the place is called Ureki, which in the Georgian Language means deep forest.

== See also ==
- Guria
