= Ali Bagautinov =

Russian mixed martial artist

Ali Bagautinov Али Багаутинов
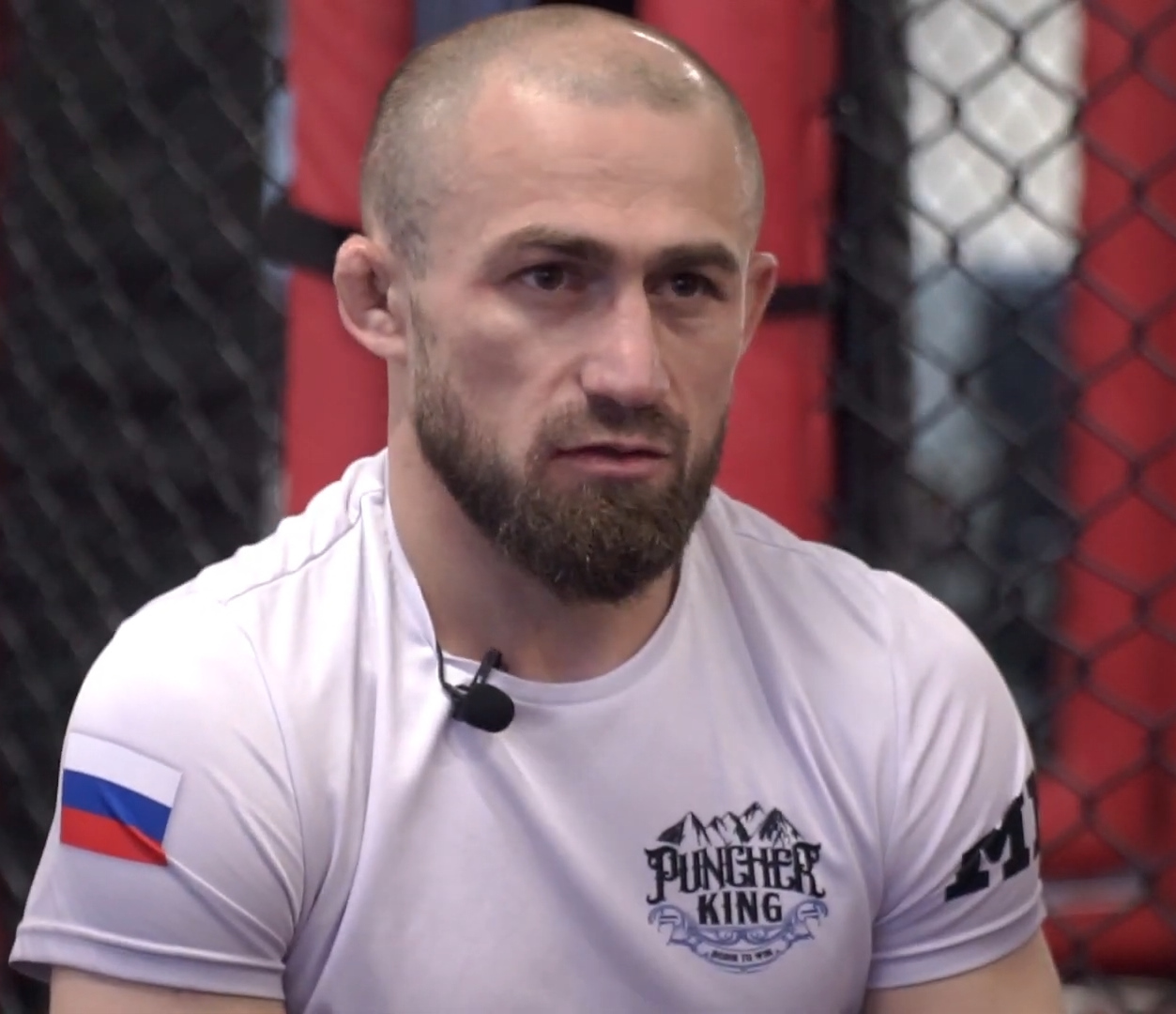
- Bagautinov in 2019
- Born: June 10, 1985 (age 41); Kizlyar, Dagestan ASSR, Russian SFSR, Soviet Union
- Other names: Puncher
- Nationality: Russian
- Height: 5 ft 4 in (1.63 m)
- Weight: 125 lb (57 kg; 8.9 st)
- Division: Flyweight
- Reach: 65 in (165 cm)
- Style: Sambo, Pankration, Wrestling
- Fighting out of: Dagestan, Russia
- Team: Fight Nights Team
- Rank: International Master of Sports in Combat Sambo; International Master of Sports in Pankration; International Master of Sports in Hand-to-hand combat International Master of Sports in Grappling
- Wrestling: Master of Sports in Freestyle Wrestling; Master of Sports in Greco-Roman wrestling
- Years active: 2009–2021

Professional boxing record
- Total: 2
- Wins: 2

Mixed martial arts record
- Total: 29
- Wins: 22
- By knockout: 6
- By submission: 5
- By decision: 11
- Losses: 7
- By knockout: 1
- By decision: 6

Other information
- Mixed martial arts record from Sherdog

Ali Bagautinov
Medal record

Representing Russia

Men's Combat Sambo

World Championships
Silver medal – second place	2010 Tashkent	-57 kg
Disqualified	2012 Minsk	-57 kg

Ali Shamilevich Bagautinov (Russian: Али Шами́льевич Багаутинов; born June 10, 1985) is a Russian former professional mixed martial artist who competed in the Flyweight division of the Ultimate Fighting Championship.

== Combat Sambo career ==
After years of competing in wrestling and sambo, Bagautinov became a world Combat Sambo champion in Minsk.

At the FIAS 2012 World Sambo Championships, Bagautinov defeated Belarusian Novitski Vladislav via decision (15-0) in the quarterfinals. In the semifinals, Bagautinov defeated Kyrgyzian Razykov Alibek via TKO at 2:19 of the first round. In the tournament final, Bagautinov defeated Kazakh Asset Sagyndykov via armbar submission at 0:35 of the first round.

Bagautinov was stripped of all FIAS awards and suspended from competition for two years (November 8, 2012 - November 8, 2014) after testing positive for methylhexanamine.

== Mixed martial arts career ==
=== Early career ===
Bagautinov made his professional MMA debut in December 2009. He is a veteran of the Russian MMA promotion Fight Nights, where he compiled a record of 8–1. In 2013, Bagautinov was listed as one of the top flyweight prospects in all of MMA.

=== Ultimate Fighting Championship ===
It was announced in June 2013 that Bagautinov had signed a five-fight deal with the UFC.

In his UFC debut, Bagautinov faced Marcos Vinicius on September 4, 2013, at UFC Fight Night 28. After a back-and-forth first two rounds, Bagautinov won the fight via TKO in the third round.

In his second fight for the promotion, Bagautinov fought Tim Elliott on November 16, 2013, at UFC 167. Bagautinov won the fight via unanimous decision.

Bagautinov fought John Lineker on February 1, 2014, at UFC 169. Bagautinov won the fight via unanimous decision.

Bagautinov faced Demetrious Johnson on June 14, 2014, at UFC 174 for the UFC Flyweight Championship. Bagautinov lost the fight via unanimous decision. Subsequent to his loss, on July 10, the British Columbia Athletic Commission (BCAC) announced that Bagautinov tested positive for erythropoietin (EPO) prior to the title fight. In response, the BCAC suspended him from mixed martial arts competition for one year.

Bagautinov's first fight after serving his suspension was against Joseph Benavidez on October 3, 2015, at UFC 192. Bagautinov lost the fight via unanimous decision.

Bagautinov next faced Geane Herrera on June 18, 2016, at UFC Fight Night 89. Bagautinov won the fight via unanimous decision.

Bagautinov was expected to face Kyoji Horiguchi on October 15, 2016, at UFC Fight Night 97. However, the promotion announced on October 6 that they had cancelled the event entirely. In turn, the pairing was quickly rescheduled and took place on November 19, 2016, at UFC Fight Night 99. He lost the fight via unanimous decision.

It was announced on January 17, 2017, that Bagautinov had chosen not to renew his contract with the UFC.

=== Post-UFC career ===
As the first bout after the UFC, Bagautinov headlined Fight Nights Global 64: Nam vs. Bagautinov against Tyson Nam on April 27, 2017. He lost the bout via knockout in the third round.

He then faced Pedro Nobre at Fight Nights Global 69: Bagautinov vs. Nobre on June 30, 2017. He won the fight via second-round submission.

On September 23, 2018, Bagautinov faced Denis Oliveira Fontes Araujo at Battle of Volga 6 and won the fight via unanimous decision.

=== Brave Combat Federation ===
Bagautinov made his promotional debut in the Brave CF against Oleg Lichkovakha at Brave CF 46 on January 16, 2021. He won the fight via unanimous decision and subsequently joined Brave CF Flyweight tournament.

His first bout in the Flyweight tournament was a Quarter-final bout against fellow UFC veteran Dustin Ortiz on April 1, 2021, at Brave CF 50. He won a competitive bout via unanimous decision.

Bagautinov was scheduled to face José Torres in the Semi-final of the Flyweight tournament at Brave CF 55 on November 6, 2021. However due to difficulties making weight, Torres pulled out and was replaced by Sean Santella. He won the bout in the first round via ground and pound after defending successfully Santella's takedown attempt. After the end of the contract with BraveFC he announced his retirement.

== Championships and accomplishments ==
=== Mixed martial arts ===
- Ultimate Fighting Championship
  - UFC.com Awards
    - 2013: Ranked #9 Newcomer of the Year
- Fight Nights Global
  - Fight Nights Flyweight Championship (One time)
    - Two successful title defenses
- Federation of MMA of Samara
  - FMMAS Flyweight Championship (One time)

=== Sambo ===
- World Sambo Federation (Not FIAS)
  - World Combat Sambo Champion (Two times)
  - Europe Combat Sambo Champion
- Combat Sambo Federation of Russia
  - Russian National Combat Sambo Champion (Five times)
  - Moscow Combat Sambo Champion (Three times)
  - Dagestan Combat Sambo Champion
  - Moscow Combat Sambo Cup Champion (Four times)

=== Pankration ===
- Russian Federation of Pangration Athlima
  - Pankration Russian National Champion
  - Moscow Cup Champion (Three times)
- World Pangration Athlima Federation
  - Pankration World Champion
  - Pankration World Cup Champion

=== Brazilian jiu-jitsu ===
- Russian Federation of Brazilian jiu-jitsu
  - Russian National Brazilian jiu-jitsu Champion

=== Wrestling ===
- Russian Wrestling Federation
  - Russian Greco-Roman Wrestling Master Rank Tournament Runner-up
  - Dagestan Freestyle Wrestling District Tournament Winner

=== Hand-to-hand combat ===
- Russian Union of Martial Arts
  - Hand-to-hand Combat Dynamo Champion
  - Hand-to-hand Police Force Combat Medalist

=== Grappling ===
- International Federation of Associated Wrestling Styles
  - Russian Grappling National Champion (Two times)
  - Moscow Grappling Cup Champion

== Mixed martial arts record ==
Professional record breakdown
29 matches	22 wins	7 losses
By knockout	6	1
By submission	5	0
By decision	11	6

Res.	Record	Opponent	Method	Event	Date	Round	Time	Location	Notes
Win	22–7	Sean Santella	TKO (punches)	Brave CF 55	November 6, 2021	1	1:01	Rostov-on-Don, Russia	Brave CF Flyweight Tournament Semifinal.
Win	21–7	Dustin Ortiz	Decision (unanimous)	Brave CF 50	April 1, 2021	3	5:00	Arad, Bahrain	Brave CF Flyweight Tournament Quarterfinal.
Win	20–7	Oleg Lichkovakha	Decision (unanimous)	Brave CF 46	January 16, 2021	3	5:00	Sochi, Russia	Catchweight (130 lbs) bout.
Loss	19–7	Zhalgas Zhumagulov	Decision (split)	Fight Nights Global 95: Bagautinov vs. Zhumagulov	October 19, 2019	5	5:00	Sochi, Russia	For the Fight Nights Global Flyweight Championship.
Win	19–6	Vartan Asatryan	Decision (unanimous)	Fight Nights Global 92: Bagautinov vs. Asatryan	April 6, 2019	5	5:00	Moscow, Russia	
Win	18–6	Denis Araujo Oliveira Fontes	Decision (unanimous)	Samara MMA Federation: Battle of Volga 6	September 23, 2018	3	5:00	Samara, Russia	Won the FMMAS Flyweight Championship.
Win	17–6	Andy Young	Decision (unanimous)	Fight Nights Global 84: Deák vs. Chupanov	March 2, 2018	3	5:00	Bratislava, Slovakia	
Win	16–6	Danny Martinez	Decision (unanimous)	Fight Nights Global 76: Bagautinov vs. Martinez	October 13, 2017	5	5:00	Krasnodar, Russia	
Win	15–6	Pedro Nobre	Submission (rear-naked choke)	Fight Nights Global 69: Bagautinov vs. Nobre	June 30, 2017	2	3:51	Novosibirsk, Russia	
Loss	14–6	Tyson Nam	KO (head kick)	Fight Nights Global 64: Nam vs. Bagautinov	April 28, 2017	3	4:59	Moscow, Russia	
Loss	14–5	Kyoji Horiguchi	Decision (unanimous)	UFC Fight Night: Mousasi vs. Hall 2	November 19, 2016	3	5:00	Belfast, Northern Ireland	
Win	14–4	Geane Herrera	Decision (unanimous)	UFC Fight Night: MacDonald vs. Thompson	June 18, 2016	3	5:00	Ottawa, Ontario, Canada	
Loss	13–4	Joseph Benavidez	Decision (unanimous)	UFC 192	October 3, 2015	3	5:00	Houston, Texas, United States	
Loss	13–3	Demetrious Johnson	Decision (unanimous)	UFC 174	June 14, 2014	5	5:00	Vancouver, British Columbia, Canada	For the UFC Flyweight Championship. Bagautinov tested positive for EPO.
Win	13–2	John Lineker	Decision (unanimous)	UFC 169	February 1, 2014	3	5:00	Newark, New Jersey, United States	UFC Flyweight title eliminator.
Win	12–2	Tim Elliott	Decision (unanimous)	UFC 167	November 16, 2013	3	5:00	Las Vegas, Nevada, United States	
Win	11–2	Marcos Vinicius	KO (punches)	UFC Fight Night: Teixeira vs. Bader	September 4, 2013	3	3:28	Belo Horizonte, Brazil	
Win	10–2	Seiji Ozuka	TKO (punches)	Fight Nights - Battle of Moscow 11	April 20, 2013	1	0:25	Moscow, Russia	Defended the Fight Nights Flyweight Championship.
Win	9–2	Andreas Bernhard	TKO (punches)	Fight Nights - Battle of Moscow 9	December 16, 2012	1	0:27	Moscow, Russia	Defended the Fight Nights Flyweight Championship.
Win	8–2	Vadim Zhlobich	Submission (guillotine choke)	Fight Nights - Battle of Desne	September 7, 2012	2	1:01	Bryansk, Russia	Bantamweight bout.
Win	7–2	Mikael Silander	Decision (unanimous)	Fight Nights - Battle of Moscow 7	June 7, 2012	2	5:00	Moscow, Russia	Won the Fight Nights Flyweight Championship.
Win	6–2	Vitaly Maksimov	Submission (rear-naked choke)	Fight Nights - Battle in Kalmykia	May 4, 2012	1	2:50	Elista, Russia	
Win	5–2	Zharkyn Baizakov	Decision (unanimous)	Fight Nights - Battle of Moscow 6	March 8, 2012	2	5:00	Moscow, Russia	
Win	4–2	Vitaliy Panteleev	TKO (punches)	Fight Nights - Battle of Moscow 5	November 5, 2011	1	4:07	Moscow, Russia	
Win	3–2	Asan Aysabekov	TKO (punches)	Fight Nights - The Fights With and Without Rules	September 21, 2011	1	2:06	Moscow, Russia	
Loss	2–2	Evgeniy Lazukov	Decision (unanimous)	FWR - Fights With Rules 2	May 26, 2011	3	5:00	Ufa, Russia	Return to Flyweight.
Loss	2–1	Vitaliy Panteleev	Decision (split)	Fight Nights - Battle of Moscow 3	March 12, 2011	2	5:00	Moscow, Russia	Lightweight debut.
Win	2–0	Dmitry Kazancev	Submission (armbar)	World Absolute FC	June 24, 2010	1	1:34	Cheboksary, Russia	Flyweight debut.
Win	1–0	Aslan Margushev	Submission (armbar)	Challenge Cup	December 19, 2009	2	2:13	Kolomna, Russia	Bantamweight debut.

== Professional boxing record ==
2 Wins (0 knockouts, 2 decisions), 0 Losses, 0 Draws
Res.	Record	Opponent	Type	Rd., Time	Date	Location	Notes
Win	2–0	(Belarus) Andrei Kalechits	UD	4	2020-11-02	Falcon Club, Minsk, Belarus	
Win	1–0	(Belarus) Anton Bekish	UD	4	2013-06-21	Krylatskoe Sport Palace, Moscow, Moscow Oblast	

== International combat sambo record ==
Record	Result	Opponent	Method	Event	Date	Round	Time	Notes
3–0	Win	(Kazakhstan) Asset Sagyndykov	Submission (armbar)	World Sambo Championships (Flyweight Division)	2012	1	0:35	International Master of Sports Final
2–0	Win	(Kyrgyzstan) Razykov Alibek	TKO (retirement)	World Sambo Championships (Flyweight Division)	2012	1	2:19	International Master of Sports Semifinal
1–0	Win	(Belarus) Vladislav Novitski	Points (15–0)	World Sambo Championships (Flyweight Division)	2012	2	5:00	International Master of Sports Quarterfinal

== See also ==
- List of male mixed martial artists
