= Dynamo Sports Palace =

Indoor sporting arena in Moscow, Russia

Coordinates: 55°51′20″N 37°29′43″E

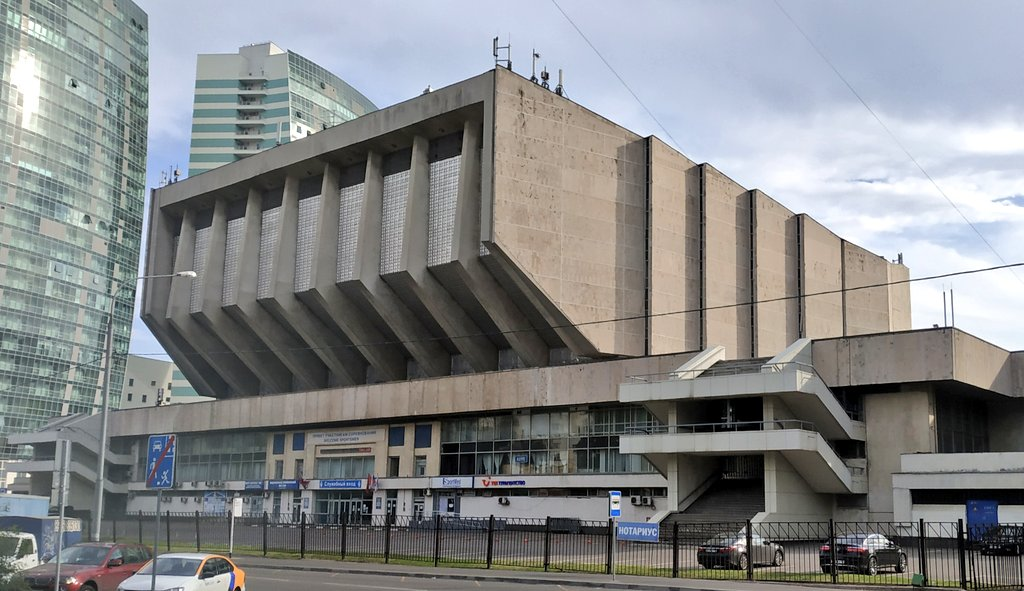
Dynamo Palace of Sports, 2020

Dynamo Palace of Sports (Russian: Дворец спорта «Динамо») is an indoor sporting arena located in Khovrino District, Moscow, Russia. The capacity of the arena is 5,000. It was built during the preparations for the 1980 Summer Olympics, hosted by Moscow, USSR and was used as a venue of the handball tournament there.

It was the home venue of Dynamo Moscow basketball team until 2006. The Dynamo Moscow volleyball team currently play their home matches here.

== See also ==
- Dynamo (disambiguation)
