= AMC Fight Nights =

Russian mixed martial arts promoter

- Current season, competition or edition: 2022 in AMC Fight Nights
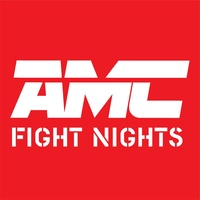
- Sport: Mixed martial arts
- Founded: 2010; 16 years ago
- Founder: Kamil Gadzhiev, Amir Muradov
- Owner: Amir Muradov
- Country: Russia
- Headquarters: Moscow
- Website: http://www.fightnights.ru

AMC Fight Nights (or Fight Nights Global before 2021) is a Russian mixed martial arts organization that previously hosted K-1 and other martial arts events. It is one of the largest promotion companies in the world and features some of the top-ranking fighters of the sport.

Fight Nights Global produces events worldwide, with the first one being held in 2010 in Moscow. As of 2018, Fight Nights Global has held over 80 events in different cities: Saint Petersburg, Novosibirsk, Yekaterinburg, Nizhny Novgorod, Omsk, Rostov-On-Don, Perm, Khabarovsk, Vladivostok, Sochi, Bryansk, Kostroma, Nizhnevartovsk, Kaspiysk, Astana, Elista, Grozny, Dushanbe, Minsk and more.

In different years the company's shows featured Fedor Emelianenko, Batu Khasikov, Vitaly Minakov, Rasul Mirzaev, Ali Bagautinov, Vladimir Mineev, Andrei Arlovski, Alexander Shlemenko, Shamil Zavurov, Murad Machaev, Gasan Umalatov, Antônio Silva, Viktor Pešta, Fábio Maldonado and many other mixed martial artists.

== History ==
=== Founding of Fight Nights Global ===
The company was founded in 2010 by a Russian athlete, businessman and sports ambassador Kamil Gadzhiev, together with a multiple time world kickboxing champion Batu Khasikov, a television producer Sangadji Tarbaev, the "SHANDESIGN" studio head Sergei Shanovich and the Goldman Sachs Russia CEO Sergey Arsenyev.

=== 2010–2015: early years ===
Initially, Fight Nights Global (at that time called FIGHT NIGHTS) fights were held in a ring under MMA and K-1 rules. The first event featured Lightweight Grand Prix, which was won by Murad Machaev. In the main event Batu Khasikov knocked out Ricardo Fernandes. Rasul Mirzaev defeated Marat Pekov via judges decision and became the first FIGHT NIGHTS champion in the Featherweight category.

The first high-profile event happened in November 2011 in Moscow and featured the Greek kickboxer Mike Zambidis facing Batu Khasikov. Batu won by TKO in the first round and broke his opponent's jaw.

In 2012, the company held seven major events with the final one being "FIGHT NIGHTS: Battle of Moscow 9" on December 16. The show featured the debut of the UFC ex-champion Andrei Arlovski. The Belarusian fighter defeated Mike Hayes from the United States via a unanimous decision.

Vitaly Minakov, Fight Nights Global promotion's household name, signed a contract with Bellator MMA in 2012.

In 2013, Vitaly won the Bellator heavyweight Grand Prix tournament and then won the Bellator MMA belt by knocking out Alexander Volkov in the first round. In April 2013, Vitaly became the first FIGHT NIGHTS fighter to make his way to the UFC. The next one was Ali Bagautinov who competed in the Flyweight division and signed a contract with the UFC after a victory over the experienced Japanese mixed martial artist Seiji Ozuka.

In June 2013 the company started using an octagonal cage that is popular in the MMA industry. In November 2013, the company hosted the first event outside of Russia, “FIGHT NIGHTS: Battle on the Nyamiha" at Minsk-Arena, Belarus. The main attraction of the night was the home performance by Andrei Arlovski.

Batu Khasikov had his last professional fight in March 2014 at “Fight Nights: Battle Of Moscow 15” where he again fought Mike Zambidis. The fight went all five rounds, Khasikov was the victor. Vladimir Mineev debuted in MMA at “Fight Nights: Battle Of Moscow 17”. The final tournament of 2014 featured Alexander Shlemenko vs. Yasubey Enomoto.

=== 2015–2016: rise in popularity, rebranding and Summa acquisition ===
In 2015 the company hosted four major shows (Fight Nights: Battle Of Moscow 19, Fight Nights: Sochi, Fight Nights: Dagestan, Fight Nights: Petersburg) and eighteen selection tournaments “Fight club FIGHT NIGHTS".

Vitaly Minakov used his interim in Bellator MMA to return to the Fight Nights Global promotion. From July 2015 to June 2016 the four-time Sambo world champion fought in 4 matches, winning early victories over Adam Maciejewski (Poland), Geronimo dos Santos (Brazil), Josh Copeland (USA) and Peter Graham (Australia).

In 2016 the company was bought by Summa Group, a conglomerate that invested in port logistics, engineering, construction, telecommunications, sports, oil and gas that was founded by Dagestani billionaire Ziyavudin Magomedov. Kamil Gadzhiev, who is also the Vice-President of Moscow MMA Federation, became the president of the newly established Fight Nights Global. Backed by substantial investments of Summa Group, 2016 was the year of a massive breakthrough for FNG on the Russian market.

Fight Nights Global 50 (June 17, 2016) in Saint Petersburg featured a fight card headlined by Fedor Emelianenko. 4 years after retirement, "The Last Emperor" decided to come back to professional sports in the Fight Nights Global cage versus one of the most uncompromising strikers of the UFC, Fabio Maldonado. The tough match ended with a split decision win for the Russian athlete. The event was broadcast worldwide via UFC Fight Pass.

=== 2017–present: global growth ===
In 2017 Fight Nights Global determined champions in all eight weight categories among men and inked plenty of international talent to the roster including Rousimar Palhares, Josh Hill, Tyson Nam and the returning Ali Bagautinov to multi-fight contracts.

The company hosted 25 events, discovering new cities and countries, including Astana and Almaty in Kazakhstan, Dushanbe in Tajikistan, Omsk, Penza, Tolyatti, Surgut, Krasnodar, Yekaterinburg, Bryansk and Ulan-Ude in Russia.

Fight Night Global president Kamil Gadzhiev announced that the promotion will introduce the Anti-Doping Control System.

Fight Nights Global 68, which took place during the International Economic Forum in Saint Petersburg, showcased Vitaly Minakov vs. Antonio Silva. Later, Novosibirsk hosted Fight Nights Global 69, where Ali Bagautinov defeated Pedro Nobre. In September, the notorious Fight Nights Global 73 took place. It featured the Russian-Brazilian confrontations Shamil Amirov vs. Rousimar Palhares, Kurban Omarov vs. Fabio Maldonado and Akhmed Aliev vs. Diego Brandao in the main event, which ended with a scandal.

Other events of the year were Fight Nights Global 77, where newly-signed Nikita Krylov KO’ed Emanuel Newton and Fight Nights Global 82, where the undefeated heavyweight Vitaly Minakov TKO’ed the top fighter from the USA, Tony Johnson.

In 2018 the company announced more international shows, including events in Brazil, USA and EU.

=== Rename to AMC Fight Nights Global ===
In 2020 November Fight Nights Global owner Kamil Gadzhiev sold his promotion to AMC Company owner Amir Muradov. After that they renamed the promotion to AMC Fight Nights Global.

== Rules ==
Fight Nights Global rules are based on the Russian MMA regulations. Elbow strikes on the ground are legal. Referees have the right to raise fighters in a stand up in the absence of activity. If the fight is a draw, additional rounds are not assigned. A typical event lasts five hours and features 11 bouts. Bouts last 3 rounds 5 minutes each and champion bouts or main event bouts are 5 rounds 5 minutes each. The championship features 8 male and 2 female weight categories: 57 kg, 61 kg, 66 kg, 70 kg, 77 kg, 84 kg, 93 kg and over 93 kg.

== List of AMC Fight Nights events ==
By year

- 2010 in Fight Nights Global
- 2011 in Fight Nights Global
- 2012 in Fight Nights Global
- 2016 in Fight Nights Global
- 2017 in Fight Nights Global
- 2018 in Fight Nights Global
- 2019 in Fight Nights Global
- 2020 in Fight Nights Global
- 2021 in AMC Fight Nights
- 2022 in AMC Fight Nights

Scheduled events

AMC Fight Nights
No.	Event	Date	Venue	Location

Events by date

No.	Event	Date	Venue	Location
137	AMC Fight Nights 126	February 21, 2025	Red Arena	Sochi, Russia
136	AMC Fight Nights 125	October 18, 2024	Red Arena	Sochi, Russia
135	AMC Fight Nights 124	August 23, 2024	Karen Demirchyan Complex	Yerevan, Armenia
134	AMC Fight Nights 123	February 23, 2024	Live Arena	Moscow, Russia
133	AMC Fight Nights 122	November 10, 2023	Live Arena	Moscow, Russia
132	AMC Fight Nights 121	July 14, 2023	Irina Viner-Usmanova Gymnastics Palace	Moscow, Russia
131	AMC Fight Nights 120	June 14, 2023	Volga Sport Arena	Ulyanovsk, Russia
130	AMC Fight Nights 119	March 18, 2023	Volga Sport Arena	Ulyanovsk, Russia
129	AMC Fight Nights 118	February 23, 2023	Red Arena	Sochi, Russia
128	AMC Fight Nights 117	January 20, 2023	Adrenaline Stadium	Moscow, Russia
127	AMC Fight Nights 116	November 11, 2022		Astrakhan, Russia
126	AMC Fight Nights 115	October 14, 2022	Red Arena	Sochi, Russia
125	AMC Fight Nights 114	September 3, 2022	Stadium Dinamo	Minsk, Belarus
124	AMC Fight Nights 113	July 15, 2022	Basket-Hall Krasnodar	Krasnodar, Russia
123	AMC Fight Nights 112	June 10, 2022	Irina Viner-Usmanova Gymnastics Palace	Moscow, Russia
122	AMC Fight Nights 111	May 6, 2022	Fetisov Arena	Vladivostok, Russia
121	AMC Fight Nights 110	March 25, 2022	SZK Zvozdnyy	Astrakhan, Russia
120	AMC Fight Nights 109	February 23, 2022	Red Arena	Sochi, Russia
119	AMC Fight Nights 108	January 28, 2022	Crocus Expo, Aquarium Arena	Krasnogorsk, Russia
118	AMC Fight Nights: 107	December 20, 2021	Minsk Arena	Minsk, Belarus
117	AMC Fight Nights: 106	November 27, 2021	Renova Ksts	Syktyvkar, Russia
116	AMC Fight Nights: 105	October 16, 2021	WOW Arena	Sochi, Russia
115	AMC Fight Nights: 104	September 24, 2021	WOW Arena	Sochi, Russia
114	AMC Fight Nights: Abdulmanap Nurmagomedov Memory Tournament	September 17, 2021	Crocus Expo Arena	Moscow, Russia
113	AMC Fight Nights 103	July 15, 2021	WOW Arena	Sochi, Russia
112	AMC Fight Nights 102	June 18, 2021	Ivan Yarygin Sports Palace	Krasnoyarsk, Russia
111	AMC Fight Nights 101: Primorsky Krai Governor's Cup	May 7, 2021	Fetisov Arena	Vladivostok, Russia
110	AMC Fight Nights 100	April 10, 2021	Luzhniki Palace of Sports	Moscow, Russia
109	AMC Fight Nights: Vladimir Voronov Memory Tournament	March 16, 2021	The world concert hall	Moscow, Russia
108	AMC Fight Nights: Sochi	February 23, 2021	WOW Arena	Sochi, Russia
107	AMC Fight Nights: Steel Heart XI	January 22, 2021	Arena Metallurg	Magnitogorsk, Russia
106	AMC Fight Nights Global 99	December 25, 2020	Basket Hall	Moscow, Russia
105	AMC Fight Nights Global: Winter Cup	December 24, 2020	Basket Hall	Moscow, Russia
104	Fight Nights Global 98: Amirov vs Bikrev	September 25, 2020		Moscow, Russia
103	Fight Nights Global 97	September 19, 2020		Elista, Russia
102	Fight Nights Global & GFC: Abdulmanap Nurmagomedov Memory Tournament	September 9, 2020	Irina Viner-Usmanova; Gymnastics Palace	Moscow, Russia
101	MMA Festival: 75th Anniversary of the Great Victory	August 28, 2020	KSK Express	Rostov on Don, Russia
100	Festival Stepping into Immortality	March 1, 2020	DIVS	Ekaterinburg, Russia
99	Fight Nights Global 96	December 28, 2019	Adrenaline Stadium	Moscow, Russia
98	Fight Nights Global 95	October 19, 2019		Sochi, Russia
97	Fight Nights Global 94	October 12, 2019	Luzhniki Palace of Sports	Moscow, Russia
96	Fight Nights Global 93: Mytyshchi Cup	April 26, 2019	Mytishchi Arena	Mytishchi, Russia
95	Fight Nights Global 92: Bagautinov vs. Asatryan	April 6, 2019	Luzhniki Palace of Sports	Moscow, Russia
94	Fight Nights Global 91	December 27, 2018	Cition Hall	Moscow, Russia
93	Fight Nights Global 90: Mineev vs. Ismailov	October 19, 2018	VTB Ice Palace	Moscow, Russia
92	Fight Nights Global 89	September 8, 2018	TBA	Bozhou, China
91	Fight Nights Global 88	August 31, 2018	Alau Arena	Astana, Kazakhstan
90	Fight Nights Global: Summer Cup 2018	June 30, 2018	TBA	Bozhou, China
89	Fight Nights Global 87: Khachatryan vs. Queally	May 19, 2018	KSK Express	Rostov-on-Don, Russia
88	Fight Nights Global 86: Nam vs. Zhumagulov	April 1, 2018	Almaty Arena	Almaty, Kazakhstan
87	Fight Nights Global 85: Alikhanov vs. Kopylov	March 30, 2018	VTB Ice Palace	Moscow, Russia
86	Fight Nights Global 84: Deák vs. Chupanov	March 2, 2018	Hant Arena	Bratislava, Slovakia
85	Fight Nights Global 83: Alibekov vs. Aliev	February 22, 2018	Luzhniki Palace of Sports	Moscow, Russia
84	Fight Nights Global 82: Minakov vs. Johnson	December 16, 2017	Luzhniki Palace of Sports	Moscow, Russia
83	Fight Nights Global 81: Matmuratov vs. Ignatiev	December 15, 2017	Arena Omsk	Omsk, Russia
82	Fight Nights Global 80: Khamitov vs. Queally	November 26, 2017	Almaty Arena	Almaty, Kazakhstan
81	Fight Nights Global 79: Pavlovich vs. Sidelnikov	November 19, 2017	Diesel Arena	Penza, Russia
80	Fight Nights Global 78: Tsarev vs. Guseinov	November 4, 2017	Lada Arena	Tolyatti, Russia
79	Fight Nights Global 77: Krylov vs. Newton	October 13, 2017	SOK Energetik	Surgut, Russia
78	Fight Nights Global 76: Bagautinov vs. Martinez	October 8, 2017	Olympus Arena	Krasnodar, Russia
77	Fight Nights Global 75: Deák vs. Chistyakov	October 6, 2017	Yubileyny Sports Palace	Saint Petersburg, Russia
76	Fight Nights Global 74: Aleksakhin vs. Graves	September 29, 2017	Luzhniki Palace of Sports	Moscow, Russia
75	Fight Nights Global 73: Aliev vs. Brandão	September 4, 2017	Ali Aliyev Sports Palace	Kaspiysk, Russia
74	Fight Nights Global 72: Hill vs. Engibaryan	August 24, 2017	Ice Cube	Sochi, Russia
73	Fight Nights Global 71: Mineev vs. Michailidis	July 29, 2017	Luzhniki Palace of Sports	Moscow, Russia
72	Fight Nights Global 70: Palhares vs. Ivanov	July 7, 2017	FSK Sports Complex	Ulan-Ude, Russia
71	Fight Nights Global 69: Bagautinov vs. Nobre	June 30, 2017	Ice Sports Palace Sibir	Novosibirsk, Russia
70	Fight Nights Global 68: Pavlovich vs. Mokhnatkin	June 2, 2017	Yubileyny Sports Palace	Saint Petersburg, Russia
69	Fight Nights Global 67: Brandão vs. Galiev	May 25, 2017	DIVS Arena	Ekaterinburg, Russia
68	Fight Nights Global 66: Alikhanov vs. Murtazaliev	May 21, 2017	Ali Aliyev Sports Palace	Kaspiysk, Russia
67	Fight Nights Global 65: Asatryan vs. Zhumagulov	May 19, 2017	Barys Arena	Astana, Kazakhstan
66	Fight Nights Global 64: Nam vs. Bagautinov	April 27, 2017	VTB Arena	Moscow, Russia
65	Fight Nights Global 63: Alibekov vs. Khamitov	April 21, 2017	Fetisov Arena	Vladivostok, Russia
64	Fight Nights Global 62: Matmuratov vs.Kurzanov	March 31, 2017	Krylatskoye Sports Palace	Moscow, Russia
63	Fight Nights Global 61: Aleksakhin vs. Enomoto	March 11, 2017	Bryansk Ice Palace	Bryansk, Russia
62	Fight Nights Global 60: Aryshev vs. Khasanov	March 4, 2017	Tax Committee Sports Center	Dushanbe, Tajikistan
61	Fight Nights Global 59: Minakov vs. Linderman	February 23, 2017	Innovator Sports Palace	Khimki, Russia
60	Fight Nights Global 58: Brandão vs. Machaev	January 28, 2017	Ali Aliyev Sports Palace	Kaspiysk, Russia

== Current champions ==
=== Mixed martial arts ===
Division	Champion	Since	Defenses
Heavyweight	Vacant		
Light Heavyweight	(Russia) Vagab Vagabov	October 16, 2021	1
Middleweight	(Russia) Vladimir Mineev	September 9, 2020	1
Welterweight	(Russia) Dmitry Bikrev	April 6, 2019	4
Lightweight	(Russia) Alexander Sarnavskiy	February 23, 2024	0
Featherweight	Vacant		
Bantamweight	(Kazakhstan) Sabit Zhusupov	October 14, 2022	1
Flyweight	Vacant		

== Championship history ==
=== Heavyweight Championship ===
over 93 kg (over 205 lb)

No.	Name	Event	Date	Defenses
Ponomarev vacated the title when he signed for ACA.
3	(Russia) Grigoriy Ponomarev	AMC Fight Nights 115; Sochi, Russia	October 14, 2022	1. def. Yusup Shuaev at AMC Fight Nights 119 on March 18, 2023
2	(Russia) Yusup Shuaev def. Grigoriy Ponomarev	AMC Fight Nights 110; Astrakhan, Russia	March 25, 2022	
Sergei Pavlovich vacated the title when he signed for UFC.
1	(Russia) Sergei Pavlovich def. Mikhail Mokhnatkin	FNG 68; Saint Petersburg, Russia	June 2, 2017	1. def. Kirill Sidelnikov at FNG 79 on November 19, 2017

=== Light Heavyweight Championship ===
93 kg (205 lbs)

No.	Name	Event	Date	Defenses
Current	(Russia) Vagab Vagabov	AMC Fight Nights 105; Sochi, Russia	October 16, 2021	1. def. David Barkhudaryan at AMC Fight Nights 113 on July 15, 2022
4	(Iran) Hasan Yousefi	AMC Fight Nights 102; Krasnoyarsk, Russia	June 18, 2021	
3	(Armenia) Armen Petrosyan def. Artur Aliskerov	MMA Festival; Rostov-on-Don, Russia	August 28, 2020	1. def. Dmitry Minakov at FNG Steel Heart XI on January 22, 2021
Nikita Krylov vacated the title when he signed for UFC.
2	(Ukraine) Nikita Krylov	FNG 87; Rostov-on-Don, Russia	May 19, 2018	
1	(Brazil) Fábio Maldonado def. Kurban Omarov	FNG 73; Kaspiysk, Russia	September 4, 2017	

=== Middleweight Championship ===
84 kg (185 lbs)

No.	Name	Event	Date	Defenses
Interim	(Russia) Dmitriy Aryshev def. Irwing Machado	AMC Fight Nights 122; Moscow, Russia	November 10, 2023	
Current	(Russia) Vladimir Mineev def. Dauren Ermekov	FNG / GFC; Moscow, Russia	September 9, 2020	1. def. Magomed Ismailov at AMC Fight Nights 105 on October 16, 2021
Roman Kopylov vacated the title when he signed for UFC.
2	(Russia) Roman Kopylov	FNG 85; Moscow, Russia	March 30, 2018	1. def. Yasubey Enomoto at FNG 91 on Dec 27, 2018
1	(Russia) Abusupyan Alikhanov def. Khalid Murtazaliev	FNG 66; Kaspiysk, Russia	May 21, 2017	

=== Welterweight Championship ===
77 kg (170 lbs)

No.	Name	Event	Date	Defenses
Current	(Russia) Dmitry Bikrev def. Maxim Butorin	FNG 92; Moscow, Russia	April 6, 2019	1. NC vs. Shamil Amirov at FNG 98 on September 25, 2020; 2. def. Goity Dazaev at FNG 100 on April 10, 2021; 3. def. Ruslan Kolodko at AMC Fight Nights 113 on July 15, 2022; 4. def. Alexey Makhno at AMC Fight Nights 121 on July 14, 2023
Georgiy Kichigin vacated the title when he signed for ONE.
1	(Kazakhstan) Georgiy Kichigin def. Gadzhimurad Khiramagomedov	FNG 65; Astana, Kazakhstan	May 19, 2017	1. def. Magomed Nurov at FNG 80 on November 26, 2017

=== Lightweight Championship ===
70 kg (155 lbs)

No.	Name	Event	Date	Defenses
Current	(Russia) Alexander Sarnavskiy	AMC Fight Nights 123; Moscow, Russia	February 23, 2024	
4	(Russia) Magomed Sulumov def. Akhmed Aliev	AMC Fight Nights 121; Moscow, Russia	July 14, 2023	
Nariman Abbasov vacated the title when he tested free agency.
3	(Azerbaijan) Nariman Abbasov def. Kuat Khamitov	FNG 93; Mytishchi, Russia	April 26, 2019	1. def. Mikhail Gogitidze at FNG 98 on September 25, 2020; 2. def. Shamil Amirov at AMC Fight Nights 100 on April 10, 2021; 3. def. Shamil Zavurov at AMC Fight Nights: Abdulmanap Nurmagomedov Memory Tournament on September 17, 2021; 4. def. Marif Piraev at AMC Fight Nights 112 on June 10, 2022
Akhmed Aliev vacated the title when he signed for PFL.
2	(Russia) Akhmed Aliev	FNG 83; Moscow, Russia	February 22, 2018	
1	(Russia) Magomedsaygid Alibekov def. Nariman Abbasov	FNG 56; Vladivostok, Russia	December 9, 2016	1. def. Kuat Khamitov at FNG 63 on April 21, 2017

=== Featherweight Championship ===
66 kg (145 lbs)

No.	Name	Event	Date	Defenses
Khabibulin vacated the title when he signed for ACA.
3	(Russia) Gleb Khabibulin def. Arkadiy Osipyan	AMC FN 115; Sochi, Russia	October 14, 2022	
Mukhamed Eminov vacated the title when he tested free agency.
2	(Russia) Mukhamed Eminov def. Aleksandr Grozin	Festival Stepping into Immortality; Ekaterinburg, Russia	March 1, 2020	1. def. Muratbek Kasymbay at FNG / GFC on September 9, 2020; 2. def. Akhmed Balkizov at FNG 99 on December 25, 2020; 3. def. Roman Silagadze at AMC Fight Nights 105 on October 16, 2021
Alexander Matmuratov vacated the title when he signed for ACA.
1	(Russia) Alexander Matmuratov def. Ilya Kurzanov	FNG 62; Moscow, Russia	March 31, 2017	1. def. Evgeniy Ignatiev at FNG 81 on December 15, 2017

=== Bantamweight Championship ===
61 kg (135 lbs)

No.	Name	Event	Date	Defenses
Current	(Kazakhstan) Sabit Zhusupov	AMC FN 115; Sochi, Russia	October 14, 2022	1. def. Wanderley Junior at AMC Fight Nights 122 on November 10, 2023
3	(Russia) Vladimir Egoyan def. Gustavo Erak	AMC Fight Nights: Sochi; Sochi, Russia	February 23, 2021	
Evgeniy Ignatiev vacated the title when he signed for RCC Boxing Promotions
2	(Russia) Evgeniy Ignatiev def. Nikita Boltabaev	FNG 94; Moscow, Russia	October 12, 2019	
Tomáš Deák vacated the title when he signed for Oktagon MMA.
1	(Slovakia) Tomáš Deák def. Nikita Chistyakov	FNG 75; Moscow, Russia	October 6, 2017	1. def. Sharamazan Chupanov at FNG 84 on March 2, 2018

=== Flyweight Championship ===
57 kg (125 lbs)

No.	Name	Event	Date	Defenses
Vartan Asatryan vacated the title when he signed for ACA.
5	(Russia) Vartan Asatryan def. Vladimir Alekseev	AMC Fight Nights 109; Sochi, Russia	February 23, 2022	
Moris Boleyan vacated the title when he tested free agency.
4	(Armenia) Moris Boleyan def. Anatoly Kondratyev	FNG Steel Heart XI; Magnitogorsk, Russia	January 22, 2021	1. def. Azizkhan Chorshanbiev at AMC Fight Nights 103 on July 15, 2021
Zhalgas Zhumagulov vacated the title when he signed for UFC.
3	(Kazakhstan) Zhalgas Zhumagulov	FNG 88; Astana, Kazakhstan	August 31, 2018	1. def. Ali Bagautinov at FNG 95 on October 19, 2019
2	(Russia) Tagir Ulanbekov	FNG 76; Moscow, Russia	October 8, 2017	
1	(Russia) Vartan Asatryan def. Zhalgas Zhumagulov	FNG 65; Astana, Kazakhstan	May 19, 2017	

=== Women's Bantamweight Championship ===
61 kg (135 lbs)

No.	Name	Event	Date	Defenses
Current	Vacant	N/A	N/A	N/A
Liana Jojua vacated the title when she signed for UFC.
1	(Georgia (country)) Liana Jojua def. Marina Mokhnatkina	FNG 83; Moscow, Russia	February 22, 2018	

== Notable fighters ==
This is a list of fighters who currently compete and have competed in the past for Fight Nights Global:

=== Mixed Martial Arts ===
- (Brazil) Ildemar Alcântara
- (Russia) Sultan Aliev
- (Belarus) Andrei Arlovski
- (Russia) Ali Bagautinov
- (Brazil) Diego Brandão
- (Russia) Julia Berezikova
- (United States) Rich Crunkilton
- (Russia) Fedor Emelianenko
- (Switzerland) Yasubey Enomoto
- (Mexico) Efraín Escudero
- (Brazil) Maiquel Falcão
- (Russia) Vener Galiev
- (Australia) Peter Graham
- (United States) Michael Graves
- (United States) Mike Hayes
- (Russia) Ali Isayev
- (Poland) Joanna Jędrzejczyk
- (United States) Tony Johnson
- (Brazil) Ivan Jorge
- (Japan) Masanori Kanehara
- (Russia) Nikita Krylov
- (Belarus) Alexei Kudin
- (Russia) Murad Machaev
- (Russia) Ruslan Magomedov
- (Georgia (country)) Levan Makashvili
- (Brazil) Fábio Maldonado
- (United States) Danny Martinez
- (United States) Derrick Mehmen
- (Russia) Vitaly Minakov
- (Russia) Vladimir Mineev
- (Russia) Rasul Mirzaev
- (Russia) Marina Mokhnatkina
- (United States) Tyson Nam
- (United States) Emanuel Newton
- (Brazil) Diego Nunes
- (Netherlands) Valentijn Overeem
- (Brazil) Rousimar Palhares
- (Czech Republic) Viktor Pešta
- (South Africa) Trevor Prangley
- (United States) Brett Rogers
- (United States) Eddie Sanchez
- (Russia) Alexander Sarnavskiy
- (Brazil) Fabiano Scherner
- (Russia) Alexander Shlemenko
- (Russia) Kirill Sidelnikov
- (Brazil) Antônio Silva
- (Brazil) Elias Silvério
- (Thailand) Chommanee Sor Taehiran
- (Cameroon) Rameau Thierry Sokoudjou
- (United States) Dominique Steele
- (Armenia) Akop Stepanyan
- (United States) Tim Sylvia
- (Russia) Michail Tsarev
- (Russia) Albert Tumenov
- (Russia) Shamil Zavurov

=== Kickboxing ===
- (Russia) Dzhabar Askerov
- (Suriname) Redouan Cairo
- (Armenia) Gago Drago
- (Belarus) Andrey Gerasimchuk
- (Armenia) Karapet Karapetyan
- (Russia) Batu Khasikov
- (Netherlands) Albert Kraus
- (Russia) Vladimir Mineev
- (Russia) Alexei Papin
- (Russia) Ramazan Ramazanov
- (Cameroon) Rameau Thierry Sokoudjou
- (Russia) Alexander Stetsurenko
- (South Africa) Warren Stevelmans
- (Greece) Mike Zambidis
