= 2022 in AMC Fight Nights =

Information
- First date: January 28, 2022
- Last date: November 11, 2022

Events
- Total events: 9

Fights
- Total fights: 96
- Title fights: 9

Chronology
2021 in Fight Nights Global	2022 in AMC Fight Nights	2023 in AMC Fight Nights

The year 2022 was the 12th year in the history of the Fight Nights, a mixed martial arts promotion based in Russia. The company continues broadcasts through Match TV and Fight Network.

== List of events ==
#	Event title	Date	Arena	Location
1	AMC Fight Nights 108	January 28, 2022	Crocus Expo, Aquarium Arena	Krasnogorsk, Russia
2	AMC Fight Nights 109	February 23, 2022	Red Arena	Sochi, Russia
3	AMC Fight Nights 110	March 25, 2022	SZK Zvozdnyy	Astrakhan, Russia
4	AMC Fight Nights 111	May 6, 2022	Fetisov Arena	Vladivostok, Russia
5	AMC Fight Nights 112	June 10, 2022	Irina Viner-Usmanova Gymnastics Palace	Moscow, Russia
6	AMC Fight Nights 113	July 15, 2022	Basket-Hall Krasnodar	Krasnodar, Russia
7	AMC Fight Nights 114	September 3, 2022	Stadium Dinamo	Minsk, Belarus
8	AMC Fight Nights 115	October 14, 2022	Red Arena	Sochi, Russia
9	AMC Fight Nights 116	November 11, 2022	N/A	Astrakhan, Russia

== AMC Fight Nights 108 ==
AMC Fight Nights 108
- Promotion: AMC Fight Nights
- Date: January 28, 2022
- Venue: Crocus Expo, Aquarium Arena
- City: Krasnogorsk, Russia

'AMC Fight Nights 108' was a mixed martial arts event held by AMC Fight Nights January 28, 2022 at the Crocus Expo, Aquarium Arena in Krasnogorsk, Russia.

=== Background ===
The event was headlined by a middleweight bout between kickboxer Alexander Stetsurenko and fistfighter Timur Nikulin, while the co-main event was a heavyweight contest between Grigory Ponomarev and the former KSW Heavyweight Champion Fernando Rodrigues Jr.

=== Results ===
AMC Fight Nights
Weight Class				Method	Round	Time	Notes
Heavyweight 120 kg	(Russia) Grigory Ponomarev	def.	(Brazil) Alison Vicente	TKO (Punches)	1	1:22	
Catchweight 82.5 kg	(Russia) Alexander Stetsurenko	def.	(Uzbekistan) Timur Nikulin	KO (Punches)	2	2:32	
Catchweight 80 kg	(Russia) Maxim Butorin	def.	(Russia) Yuriy Ermolenko	Decision (Unanimous)	3	5:00	
Welterweight 77 kg	(Russia) Kirill Kryukov	def.	(Russia) Pavel Ardychev	Decision (Unanimous)	3	5:00	
Featherweight 66 kg	(Russia) Gleb Khabibulin	def.	(Russia) Furkat Komilov	KO (Punches)	3	0:40	
Lightweight 70 kg	(Tajikistan) Dorobshokh Nabotov	def.	(Russia) Murad Abdulazimov	TKO (Punches)	1	3:40	
Featherweight 66 kg	(Russia) Nikolai Denisov	def.	(Tajikistan) Muib Gulobov	Submission (Triangle Choke)	3	1:33	
Welterweight 77 kg	(Russia) Magomed Aliev	def.	(Russia) Imam Saitov	TKO (Punches)	2	2:21	

== AMC Fight Nights 109 ==
AMC Fight Nights 109
- Promotion: AMC Fight Nights
- Date: February 23, 2022
- Venue: Red Arena
- City: Sochi, Russia

'AMC Fight Nights 109' was a mixed martial arts event held by AMC Fight Nights February 23, 2022 at the Red Arena in Sochi, Russia.

=== Background ===
An AMC Fight Nights Featherweight Championship bout between the reigning champion Mukhamed Eminov and Taigro Costa was scheduled for the event.

An AMC Fight Nights Flyweight Championship bout for the vacant title between Vartan Asatryan and Vladimir Alekseev was scheduled for the event.

=== Results ===
AMC Fight Nights
Weight Class				Method	Round	Time	Notes
Catchweight 87 kg	(Armenia) Mikhail Allakhverdian	def.	(Brazil) Márcio Santos	Decision (Unanimous)	3	5:00	
Flyweight 57 kg	(Russia) Vartan Asatryan	def.	(Russia) Vladimir Alekseev	Decision (Unanimous)	5	5:00	For the vacant AMC Fight Nights Flyweight Championship
Light Heavyweight 93 kg	(Russia) David Barkhudaryan	def.	(Brazil) Brendson Ribeiro	TKO (Punches)	1	1:07	
Catchweight 90 kg	(Russia) Artur Alibulatov	def.	(Brazil) Vinicius Cruz	TKO (Injury)	1	3:05	
Featherweight 66 kg	(Russia) Anzor Chakaev	def.	(Russia) Ruslan Khairulin	Decision (Unanimous)	3	5:00	
Welterweight 77 kg	(Russia) Gadzhimurad Amirzhanov	def.	(Russia) Alexander Chernov	Submission (Triangle Choke)	3	4:30	
Lightweight 70 kg	(Turkey) Halil Amir	def.	(Russia) Vasily Kozlov	KO (Knee)	3	0:10	
Bantamweight 61 kg	(Azerbaijan) Magerram Gasanzade	def.	(Russia) Magomed Kamalov	Decision (Split)	3	5:00	
Middleweight 84 kg	(Russia) Amazasp Martirosyan	def.	(Russia) Bashir Zakharov	Submission (Guillotine Choke)	2	3:30	
Catchweight 81 kg	(Russia) Magomed Magomedov	def.	(Russia) Vladimir Chupin	Decision (Unanimous)	3	5:00	

== AMC Fight Nights 110 ==
AMC Fight Nights 110
- Promotion: AMC Fight Nights
- Date: March 25, 2022
- Venue: SZK Zvozdnyy
- City: Astrakhan, Russia

'AMC Fight Nights 110' was a mixed martial arts event held by AMC Fight Nights March 25, 2022 at the SZK Zvozdnyy in Astrakhan, Russia.

=== Background ===
An AMC Fight Nights Heavyweight Championship bout for the vacant title between Grigoriy Ponomarev and Yusup Shuaev was scheduled as the event headliner.

=== Results ===
AMC Fight Nights
Weight Class				Method	Round	Time	Notes
Heavyweight 120 kg	(Russia) Yusup Shuaev	def.	(Russia) Grigoriy Ponomarev	TKO (Punches)	2	4:51	For the vacant AMC Fight Nights Heavyweight Championship
Welterweight 77 kg	(Kazakhstan) Goity Dazaev	def.	(Russia) Oleg Kosinov	Decision (Unanimous)	3	5:00	
Welterweight 77 kg	(Russia) Alexey Makhno	def.	(Russia) Aleksandr Grebnev	Decision (Unanimous)	3	5:00	
Welterweight 77 kg	(Russia) Yuriy Ermolenko	def.	(Russia) Kirill Kryukov	Decision (Unanimous)	3	5:00	
Middleweight 84 kg	(Russia) Salamu Munaev	def.	(Russia) Israel Khizbulaev	Submission (Rear naked choke)	2	3:32	
Featherweight 66 kg	(Russia) Sultanali Davudov	def.	(Russia) Tumer Ondar	TKO (Punches)	2	3:20	
Preliminary Card
Lightweight 70 kg	(Russia) Tamerlan Ashakhanov	def.	(Russia) Ruslan Aliev	Decision (Unanimous)	3	5:00	
Light Heavyweight 93 kg	(Russia) Gadzhimurad Antigulov	def.	(Russia) Viktor Vecherin	TKO (Punches)	2	2:39	
Light Heavyweight 93 kg	(Russia) Satrudin Vakhidov	def.	(Russia) Evgeny Mikhailov	TKO (Punches)	2	1:37	
Welterweight 77 kg	(Russia) Denis Zeinedinov	def.	(Russia) Benyamin Mirolyubov	TKO (Punches)	2	3:25	
Catchweight 100 kg	(Russia) Kamil Guseynov	def.	(Russia) Evgeny Myakinkin	Decision (Unanimous)	3	5:00	
Bantamweight 61 kg	(Russia) Saygid Abdulaev	def.	(Russia) Aydemir Kazbekov	KO (Body kick)	1	2:15	
Lightweight 70 kg	(Azerbaijan) Nurlan Gasanov	def.	(Russia) Kirill Anshakov	TKO (Punches)	2	2:24	
Catchweight 62 kg	(Kyrgyzstan) Syymyk Kultaev	vs.	(Russia) Shamil Bakhachaliev	Submission (Rear naked choke)	1	3:00	

== AMC Fight Nights 111 ==
AMC Fight Nights 111: Kovalev vs. Santos
- Promotion: AMC Fight Nights
- Date: May 6, 2022
- Venue: Fetisov Arena
- City: Vladivostok, Russia

'AMC Fight Nights 111: Kovalev vs. Santos' was a mixed martial arts event held by AMC Fight Nights on May 6, 2022 at the Fetisov Arena in Vladivostok, Russia.

=== Results ===
AMC Fight Nights
Weight Class				Method	Round	Time	Notes
Middleweight 84 kg	(Brazil) Márcio Santos	def.	(Russia) Gennadiy Kovalev	Submission (Rear-naked choke)	1	3:09	
Featherweight 66 kg	(Russia) Magomedshapi Gasayniev	def.	(Brazil) Taigro Costa	Decision (Split)	3	5:00	
Catchweight 75 kg	(Russia) Vladimir Osipov	def.	(Russia) Khamzat Dalgiev	TKO (Doctor Stoppage)	2	5:00	
Welterweight 77 kg	(Russia) Gadzhi Zaipulaev	def.	(Russia) Gela Beridze	TKO (Punches)	2	0:49	
Preliminary Card
Catchweight 63 kg	(Azerbaijan) Magerram Gasanzade	def.	(Russia) Viktor Nizovoy	TKO (Punches)	1	0:36	
Featherweight 66 kg	(Russia) Vladislav Belyaev	def.	(Russia) Maksim Musikhin	Decision (Unanimous)	3	3:00	Kickboxing
Welterweight 77 kg	(Russia) Abakar Arslanbekov	def.	(Russia) Khachik Khlgatyan	Decision (Split)	3	5:00	
Middleweight 84 kg	(Russia) Bashir Zakharov	def.	(Russia) Emir Matuev	Decision (Unanimous)	3	5:00	
Flyweight 57 kg	(Russia) Ilya Pankin	def.	(Russia) Daniil Arapov	Decision (Unanimous)	3	5:00	

== AMC Fight Nights 112 ==
AMC Fight Nights 112: Abbasov vs Piraev
- Promotion: AMC Fight Nights
- Date: June 10, 2022
- Venue: Irina Viner-Usmanova Gymnastics Palace
- City: Moscow, Russia

'AMC Fight Nights 112: Abbasov vs Piraev' was a mixed martial arts event held by AMC Fight Nights on June 10, 2022 at the Irina Viner-Usmanova Gymnastics Palace in Moscow, Russia.

=== Results ===
AMC Fight Nights
Weight Class				Method	Round	Time	Notes
Lightweight 70 kg	(Azerbaijan) Nariman Abbasov (c)	def.	(Russia) Marif Piraev	TKO (Corner Stoppage)	2	5:00	For the AMC Fight Nights Lightweight Championship
Welterweight 77 kg	(Azerbaijan) Tahir Abdullaev	def.	(Russia) Maxim Butorin	Decision (Unanimous)	3	5:00	
Welterweight 77 kg	(Russia) Artur Pronin	def.	(Russia) Yuriy Ermolenko	Decision (Split)	3	5:00	
Welterweight 77 kg	(Armenia) Viktor Azatyan	def.	(Russia) Oleg Kosinov	TKO (Ground And Pound)	2	1:45	
Featherweight 66 kg	(Russia) Roman Silagadze	def.	(Russia) Nikolai Denisov	TKO (Ground And Pound)	2	1:45	
Middleweight 84 kg	(Russia) Sergey Khrisanov	def.	(Russia) Nikita Severov	Decision (Unanimous)	3	5:00	
Heavyweight 120 kg	(Russia) Sultan Murtazaliev	def.	(Russia) Albert Nasugaev	Decision (Unanimous)	3	5:00	
Lightweight 70 kg	(Russia) Magomed Sulumov	def.	(Russia) Roman Avdalyan	Decision (Unanimous)	3	5:00	
Heavyweight 120 kg	(Russia) Aziz Nurillaev	def.	(Russia) Egor Blashkevich	Decision (Unanimous)	3	5:00	
Welterweight 77 kg	(Russia) Magomedkamil Malikov	def.	(Moldova) Mikhai Bachu	TKO (Ground And Pound)	1	3:16	
Middleweight 84 kg	(Russia) Rasul Kadiev	def.	(Russia) Maxim Korotitskiy	Decision (Unanimous)	3	5:00	
Bantamweight 61 kg	(Russia) Semyon Batuev	def.	(Russia) Yakup Ataev	KO (Spinning Back Fist)	1	1:30	
Bantamweight 61 kg	(Russia) Aleksandr Shashutin	def.	(Russia) Rustam Teuvazhukov	TKO (Ground And Pound)	2	0:23	
Lightweight 70 kg	(Russia) Vyacheslav Starikov	def.	(Russia) Danil Kirikov	Submission (Rear-Naked Choke)	2	2:33	

== AMC Fight Nights 113 ==
AMC Fight Nights 113: Vagabov vs Barkhudaryan
- Promotion: AMC Fight Nights
- Date: July 15, 2022
- Venue: Basket-Hall Krasnodar
- City: Krasnodar, Russia

'AMC Fight Nights 113: Vagabov vs Barkhudaryan' was a mixed martial arts event held by AMC Fight Nights on July 15, 2022 at the Basket-Hall Krasnodar in Krasnodar, Russia.

=== Results ===
AMC Fight Nights
Weight Class				Method	Round	Time	Notes
Light Heavyweight 93 kg	(Russia) Vagab Vagabov (c)	def.	(Russia) David Barkhudaryan	TKO (Punches)	4	1:25	For the AMC Fight Nights Light Heavyweight Championship
Welterweight 77 kg	(Russia) Dmitry Bikrev (c)	def.	(Belarus) Ruslan Kolodko	Decision (Split)	5	5:00	For the AMC Fight Nights Welterweight Championship
Bantamweight 61 kg	(Russia) Anatoly Kondratiev	def.	(Azerbaijan) Magerram Gasanzade	Decision (Unanimous)	3	5:00	
Welterweight 77 kg	(Russia) Kirill Kryukov	def.	(Russia) Aleksandr Grebnev	Decision (Unanimous)	3	5:00	
Featherweight 66 kg	(Tajikistan) Ismail Musukaev	def.	(Russia) Anvar Magomaev	Decision (Unanimous)	3	5:00	
Flyweight 57 kg	(Russia) Gadzhimurad Abuev	def.	(Russia) Andrey Tymushev	Decision (Unanimous)	3	5:00	
Welterweight 77 kg	(Russia) Yuriy Ermolenko	def.	(Russia) Amazasp Martirosyan	Submission (Kneebar)	2	4:40	
Middleweight 84 kg	(Afghanistan) Ahmed Wali Hotak	def.	(Russia) Vladimir Osipov	Decision (Unanimous)	3	5:00	
Heavyweight 120 kg	(Russia) Kazbek Saidaliev	def.	(Uruguay) Cafu Falcon	KO	1	0:26	
Featherweight 66 kg	(Russia) Islam Dumanov	def.	(Russia) Kirill Gonin	KO	2	1:35	
Middleweight 84 kg	(Armenia) Armen Torosyan	def.	(Russia) Mikhail Linnik	KO	1	3:44	
Bantamweight 61 kg	(Russia) Alexey Silin	def.	(Russia) Daniil Buslovsky	KO	1	3:13	

== AMC Fight Nights 114 ==
AMC Fight Nights 114: Romankevich vs. Zuluzinho
- Promotion: AMC Fight Nights
- Date: September 3, 2022
- Venue: Stadium Dinamo
- City: Minsk, Belarus

'AMC Fight Nights 114: Romankevich vs. Zuluzinho' was a mixed martial arts event held by AMC Fight Nights on September 3, 2022 at the Stadium Dinamo in Minsk, Belarus.

=== Results ===
AMC Fight Nights 114
Weight Class				Method	Round	Time	Notes
Heavyweight 120 kg	(Belarus) Petr Romankevich	def.	(Brazil) Zuluzinho	KO (Knee)	1	4:52	
Welterweight 77 kg	(Belarus) Mikhail Bondar	def.	(Russia) Alexey Makhno	TKO (Punches)	2	1:12	
Welterweight 77 kg	(Armenia) Viktor Azatyan	def.	(Russia) Yuriy Ermolenko	Decision (Unanimous)	3	5:00	
Women's Strawweight 52 kg	(Belarus) Antonina Kuleshova	def.	(Russia) Maria Makeeva	TKO (Punches)	1	1:43	
Featherweight 66 kg	(Belarus) Artem Bachun	def.	(Tajikistan) Makhram Kholimbekov	Decision (Unanimous)	3	5:00	
Flyweight 61 kg	(Russia) Muso Vistokadamov	def.	(Belarus) Evgeny Manko	Decision (Unanimous)	3	5:00	

== AMC Fight Nights 115 ==
AMC Fight Nights 115
- Promotion: AMC Fight Nights
- Date: October 14, 2022
- Venue: Red Arena
- City: Sochi, Russia

'AMC Fight Nights 115' was a mixed martial arts event held by AMC Fight Nights on October 14, 2022 at the Red Arena in Sochi, Russia.

=== Results ===
AMC Fight Nights 115
Weight Class				Method	Round	Time	Notes
Heavyweight 120 kg	(Russia) Grigoriy Ponomarev	def.	(Russia) Yusup Shuaev (c)	Submission (Rear-Naked Choke)	1	4:03	For the AMC Fight Nights Heavyweight Championship
Featherweight 66 kg	(Russia) Gleb Khabibulin	def.	(Armenia) Arkadiy Osipyan	Decision (Unanimous)	5	5:00	For the vacant AMC Fight Nights Featherweight Championship
Bantamweight 61 kg	(Kazakhstan) Sabit Zhusupov	def.	(Russia) Vladimir Egoyan (c)	Decision (Unanimous)	5	5:00	For the AMC Fight Nights Bantamweight Championship
Preliminary Card
Lightweight 70 kg	(Russia) Tamirlan Ashakhanov	def.	(Russia) Sevak Arakelyan	Decision (Unanimous)	3	5:00	
Heavyweight 120 kg	(Russia) Mikhail Gazaev	def.	(Ukraine) Yuri Kiselov	KO (Punch)	1	0:16	
Middleweight 84 kg	(Russia) Dinislam Zeynedinov	def.	(Ukraine) Dzhonibek Atadzhanov	Submission (Guillotine Choke)	1	3:59	
Featherweight 66 kg	(Russia) Tumer Ondar	def.	(Kyrgyzstan) Adilet Ashimov	Decision (Unanimous)	3	5:00	
Bantamweight 61 kg	(Russia) Takhir Tokarev	def.	(Russia) Gadzhimurad Abuev	Technical Submission (Triangle Choke)	1	1:07	
Welterweight 77 kg	(Russia) Askhab Paskhaev	def.	(Russia) Vladimir Osipov	Decision (Unanimous)	3	5:00	
Catchweight 68 kg	(Russia) Dmitriy Ionin	def.	(Russia) Evgeny Kurovskoy	Decision (Unanimous)	3	5:00	
Flyweight 57 kg	(Tajikistan) Maksud Alinazarov	def.	(Russia) Kavkaz Kerimov	Submission (Rear-Naked Choke)	2	1:41	

== AMC Fight Nights 116 ==
AMC Fight Nights 116
- Promotion: AMC Fight Nights
- Date: November 11, 2022
- City: Astrakhan, Russia

'AMC Fight Nights 116' was a mixed martial arts event held by AMC Fight Nights on November 11, 2022 in Astrakhan, Russia.

=== Results ===
AMC Fight Nights 116
Weight Class				Method	Round	Time	Notes
Welterweight 77 kg	(Kazakhstan) Goity Dazaev	def.	(Russia) Maxim Butorin	Decision (Unanimous)	3	5:00	
Bantamweight 61 kg	(Russia) Vartan Asatryan	def.	(Russia) Anatoly Kondratiev	KO (Flying Knee)	1	0:21	
Middleweight 84 kg	(Russia) Gennady Zuev	def.	(Russia) Magomedkhan Muselemov	Decision (Unanimous)	3	5:00	
Featherweight 66 kg	(Russia) Roman Silagadze	def.	(Russia) Magomed Abdusalamov	Submission (Von Flue choke)	1	4:40	
Heavyweight 120 kg	(Russia) Omar Aliev	def.	(Russia) Denis Cherkasov	Submission (Arm-Triangle Choke)	3	1:15	
Welterweight 77 kg	(Russia) Sergey Sharaev	def.	(Russia) Alexander Storozhuk	TKO (Punches)	1	1:29	
Lightweight 70 kg	(Russia) Ali Khaybulaev	def.	(Russia) Artur Genzheev	TKO (Retirement)	2	5:00	Amateur Bout.
Featherweight 66 kg	(Russia) Erdn Ubushiev	def.	(Russia) Rasul Chekhantaev	Decision (Unanimous)	3	5:00	
Welterweight 77 kg	(Russia) Alexander Aralov	def.	(Russia) Kadyr Bershev	Submission (Rear-Naked Choke)	1	2:48	
Featherweight 66 kg	(Russia) Gairbek Dalgatov	def.	(Russia) Lamet Akhmedov	TKO (punches)	2	4:25	
Featherweight 66 kg	(Russia) Rolan Rakhmetov	def.	(Russia) Emil Arygov	TKO (Punches)	1	4:17	
Bantamweight 61 kg	(Russia) Nikita Starostenko	def.	(Russia) Ilya Polyakov	TKO (Punches)	2	3:35	

== See also ==
- 2022 in UFC
- 2022 in Bellator MMA
- 2022 in ONE Championship
- 2022 in Absolute Championship Akhmat
- 2022 in Konfrontacja Sztuk Walki
- 2022 in Rizin Fighting Federation
- 2022 in LUX Fight League
- 2022 in Brave Combat Federation
- 2022 in Road FC
- 2022 Professional Fighters League season
- 2022 in Eagle Fighting Championship
- 2022 in Legacy Fighting Alliance
