= 2021 in AMC Fight Nights =

Information
- First date: January 22, 2021
- Last date: December 20, 2021

Events
- Total events: 12

Fights
- Total fights: 151
- Title fights: 11

Chronology
2020 in Fight Nights Global	2021 in AMC Fight Nights	2022 in AMC Fight Nights

The year 2021 was the 11th year in the history of the Fight Nights, a mixed martial arts promotion based in Russia. The company continues broadcasts through Match TV and Fight Network.

== List of events ==
#	Event title	Date	Arena	Location
1	AMC Fight Nights: Steel Heart XI	January 22, 2021	Arena Metallurg	Magnitogorsk, Russia
2	AMC Fight Nights: Sochi	February 23, 2021	WOW Arena	Sochi, Russia
3	AMC Fight Nights: Vladimir Voronov Memory Tournament	March 16, 2021	The world concert hall	Moscow, Russia
4	AMC Fight Nights 100	April 10, 2021	Luzhniki Palace of Sports	Moscow, Russia
5	AMC Fight Nights 101: Primorsky Krai Governor's Cup	May 7, 2021	Fetisov Arena	Vladivostok, Russia
6	AMC Fight Nights 102	June 18, 2021	Ivan Yarygin Sports Palace	Krasnoyarsk, Russia
7	AMC Fight Nights 103	July 15, 2021	WOW Arena	Sochi, Russia
8	AMC Fight Nights: Abdulmanap Nurmagomedov Memory Tournament	September 17, 2021	Crocus Expo Arena	Moscow, Russia
9	AMC Fight Nights: 104	September 24, 2021	WOW Arena	Sochi, Russia
10	AMC Fight Nights: 105	October 16, 2021	WOW Arena	Sochi, Russia
11	AMC Fight Nights: 106	November 27, 2021	Renova Ksts	Syktyvkar, Russia
12	AMC Fight Nights: 107	December 20, 2021	Minsk Arena	Minsk, Belarus

== AMC Fight Nights: Steel Heart XI ==
AMC Fight Nights: Steel Heart XI
- Promotion: AMC Fight Nights
- Date: January 22, 2021
- Venue: Arena Metallurg
- City: Magnitogorsk, Russia

'AMC Fight Nights Global: Steel Heart XI' was a mixed martial arts event held by AMC Fight Nights January 22, 2021 at the Arena Metallurg in Magnitogorsk, Russia.

=== Background ===
The event was headlined by a Fight Nights Light Heavyweight title fight between Armen Petrosyan and Dmitry Minakov, while the co-main event was contested between Anatoly Kondratiev and Moris Boleyan for the flyweight title.

Kuat Khamitov was scheduled to fight Magomed Magomedov in a lightweight bout. Magomedov later withdrew from the fight, and was replaced by Alexey Ilyenko.

In the sole women's fight of the card, Viktoriya Khodko faced the debuting Sofiya Shvyreva at featherweight.

=== Results ===
AMC Fight Nights
Weight class				Method	Round	Time	Notes
Light Heavyweight 93 kg	(Armenia) Armen Petrosyan (c)	def.	(Russia) Dmitry Minakov	KO (Kick to the Body)	2	3:09	For the AMC Fight Nights Light Heavyweight Championship
Welterweight 77 kg	(Russia) Maxim Butorin	def.	(Russia) Maxim Korotitsky	Submission (Triangle Choke)	2	3:03	
Flyweight 57 kg	(Armenia) Moris Boleyan	def.	(Russia) Anatoly Kondratyev	Submission (Triangle Choke)	2	3:43	For the vacant AMC Fight Nights Flyweight Championship
W.Featherweight 66 kg	(Russia) Viktorya Khodko	def.	(Russia) Sofiya Shvyryova	Decision (Unanimous)	3	5:00	
Light Heavyeight 93 kg	(Russia) Artur Aliskerov	def.	(Ukraine) Vitaly Kiselyov	TKO (Punches)	1	0:24	
Catchweight 80 kg	(Kazakhstan) Kuat Khamitov	def.	(Russia) Maxim Panteleyev	TKO (Punches)	1	0:49	
Featherweight 66 kg	(Kyrgyzstan) Nizambek Zhunusov	def.	(Kazakhstan) Vladimir Byalobzhitsky	TKO (Retirement)	2	5:00	
Lightweight 70 kg	(Russia) Vladimir Ishmenev	def.	(France) Anthony Serre	Submission (Rear-Naked Choke)	1	1:57	
Flyweight 57 kg	(Kyrgyzstan) Muhamedali Arykov	def.	(Tajikistan) Sayfullo Mirzoev	Decision (Unanimous)	3	5:00	
Welterweight 77 kg	(Russia) Akhmed Magomadov	def.	(Cameroon) Frank Yussa	Submission (Punches)	2	1:11	
Catchweight 64 kg	(Tajikistan) Nadjmudin Sobirov	def.	(Russia) Mikhail Dekterev	TKO (Punches)	1	1:24	
Catchweight 81.5 kg	(Russia) Aleksandr Ivaschenko	def.	(Russia) Egor Belkov	Submission (Rear-Naked Choke)	1	3:28	

== AMC Fight Nights: Sochi ==
AMC Fight Nights: Sochi
- Promotion: AMC Fight Nights
- Date: February 23, 2021
- Venue: WOW Arena
- City: Sochi, Russia

'AMC Fight Nights: Sochi' was a mixed martial arts event held by AMC Fight Nights February 23, 2021 at the WOW Arena in Sochi, Russia.

=== Background ===
The event was headlined by a welterweight bout between the former Bellator Welterweight champion Andrey Koreshkov and the former Shooto Brazil Middleweight champion Adriano Rodrigues.

In the co-main event, Vladimir Egoyan and Sharamazan Chupanov were scheduled to fight for the vacant AMC Fight Nights Bantamweight Championship.

The event also featured the return of the former PRIDE openweight Zuluzinho, who was scheduled to fight the undefeated heavyweight Yusup Shuaev.

=== Results ===
AMC Fight Nights
Weight class				Method	Round	Time	Notes
Welterweight 77 kg	(Russia) Andrey Koreshkov	def.	(Brazil) Adriano Rodrigues	Submission (Armbar)	1	4:38	
Bantamweight 61 kg	(Russia) Vladimir Egoyan	def.	(Brazil) Gustavo Erak	TKO (Arm Injury)	4	3:09	For the vacant AMC Fight Nights Bantamweight Championship
Openweight	(Russia) Yusup Shuaev	def.	(Brazil) Zuluzinho	Decision (Majority)	3	5:00	
Middleweight 84 kg	(Russia) David Barkhudaryan	def.	(Brazil) Márcio Santos	TKO (Punches)	1	2:19	
Flyweight 57 kg	(Russia) Badmatsyren Dorzhiev	def.	(Brazil) Rildeci Dias	Decision (Unanimous)	3	5:00	
Lightweight 70 kg	(Russia) Shamil Michilov	def.	(Russia) Ruslan Khubolov	Submission (Guillotine Choke)	1	1:56	
Catchweight 68 kg	(Russia) Azamat Achmiz	def.	(Russia) Sergei Borisov	TKO (Punches)	2	1:25	
Welterweight 77 kg	(Russia) Alibeg Rasulov	def.	(Russia) Mikhail Turkanov	TKO (Punches)	1	3:04	
Bantamweight 61 kg	(Russia) Anzor Abzhamov	def.	(Russia) Anton Vakunov	Decision (Unanimous)	3	5:00	

== AMC Fight Nights: Vladimir Voronov Memory Tournament ==
AMC Fight Nights: Vladimir Voronov Memory Tournament
- Promotion: AMC Fight Nights
- Date: March 16, 2021
- Venue: The world concert hall
- City: Moscow, Russia

'AMC Fight Nights: Vladimir Voronov Memory Tournament' was a mixed martial arts event held by AMC Fight Nights March 16, 2021 at The world concert hall in Moscow, Russia.

=== Background ===
The event was headlined by a welterweight bout between Alexey Makhno and the 60-fight veteran Vaso Bakočević.

=== Results ===
AMC Fight Nights
Weight class				Method	Round	Time	Notes
Welterweight 77 kg	(Russia) Alexey Makhno	def.	(Montenegro) Vaso Bakočević	Decision (Unanimous)	3	5:00	
Heavyweight 120 kg	(Russia) Magomed Malikov	def.	(Ukraine) Yuri Kiselov	TKO (Submission to Strikes)	1	2:55	
Heavyweight 120 kg	(Russia) Grigory Ponomaryov	def.	(Russia) Timofey Mishev	TKO (Punches)	1	0:46	
Welterweight 77 kg	(Russia) Oleg Kosinov	def.	(Serbia) Aleksandar Jankovich	Decision (Unanimous)	3	5:00	
Featherweight 66 kg	(Russia) Sultanali Davudov	def.	(Brazil) Antônio Carlos Ribeiro	TKO (Punches)	3	0:27	
Middleweight 84 kg	(Russia) Sadrudin Vakhidov	def.	(Russia) Roman Gnezdilov	KO (Knee to the Body)	1	4:24	
Preliminary card
Welterweight 77 kg	(Russia) Makhmud Gaziev	def.	(Russia) Aleksandr Chernov	Decision (Unanimous)	3	5:00	
Middleweight 84 kg	(Russia) Salamu Munaev	def.	(Belarus) Pavel Masalsky	Submission (Guillotine Choke)	2	2:00	
Middleweight 84 kg	(Russia) Yuriy Ermolenko	def.	(Russia) Aslan Tsalkosov	Submission (Rear-Naked Choke)	3	3:21	
Welterweight 77 kg	(Georgia (country)) Zalimkhan Yusupov	def.	(Moldova) Mikhay Bachu	Submission (Rear-Naked Choke)	1	3:33	
Flyweight 57 kg	(Tajikistan) Khizbula Khabirov	def.	(Russia) Nikolay Andreev	Submission (Rear-Naked Choke)	1	3:03	
Heavyweight 120 kg	(Azerbaijan) Emin Sharifov	vs.	(Kyrgyzstan) Shergazi Saktanov	TKO (Punches)	1	1:53	
Light Heavyweight 93 kg	(Tajikistan) Said Munaev	def.	(Russia) Maxim Erofeev	Submission (Armbar)	1	0:26	
Heavyweight 120 kg	(Russia) Kamil Guseinov	def.	(Tajikistan) Maksad Mansurov	TKO (Punches)	1	2:38	
Welterweight 77 kg	(Russia) Ruslan Barkalaev	def.	(Kyrgyzstan) Oskon Zhumadylov	Submission (Triangle Choke)	1	3:13	
W.Strawweight 52 kg	(Russia) Viktoria Dudakova	def.	(Russia) Anastasia Moskvicheva	Submission (Rear-Naked Choke)	1	0:30	

== AMC Fight Nights 100 ==
AMC Fight Nights 100
- Promotion: AMC Fight Nights
- Date: April 10, 2021
- Venue: Luzhniki Palace of Sports
- City: Moscow, Russia

'AMC Fight Nights 100' was a mixed martial arts event held by AMC Fight Nights on April 10, 2021, in Moscow, Russia.

=== Background ===
This event featured two title fights, first the reigning AMC Fight Nights Welterweight Champion Dmitry Bikrev made his second title defense against Goity Dazaev as the event headliner. And in the co-main event, a bout for the AMC Fight Nights Lightweight Championship between the reigning champ Nariman Abbasov and top contender Shamil Amirov.

=== Results ===
AMC Fight Nights 100
Weight class				Method	Round	Time	Notes
Welterweight 77 kg	(Russia) Dmitry Bikrev (c)	def.	(Kazakhstan) Goity Dazaev	TKO (Punches)	3	0:42	For the AMC Fight Nights Welterweight Championship
Lightweight 70 kg	(Azerbaijan) Nariman Abbasov (c)	def.	(Russia) Shamil Amirov	TKO (Punches)	3	3:20	For the AMC Fight Nights Lightweight Championship
Featherweight 66 kg	(Russia) Roman Silagadze	def.	(Armenia) Akop Stepanyan	Submission (Arm-Triangle Choke)	2	4:44	
Lightweight 70 kg	(Russia) Vladimir Kuzminykh	def.	(Russia) Egor Khodakov	TKO (Injury)	1	5:00	
Welterweight 77 kg	(Afghanistan) Sami Fayzi	def.	(Russia) Sergey Denisov	Decision (Unanimous)	3	5:00	
Catchweight 68 kg	(Russia) Gleb Khabibulin	def.	(Russia) Nabi Ashurlaev	Decision (Unanimous)	3	5:00	
Light Heavyweight 93 kg	(Russia) Vagab Vagabov	def.	(Brazil) Eder de Souza	KO (Punches)	2	1:48	
Featherweight 66 kg	(Russia) Murad Nukkhadiev	def.	(Russia) Vladislav Tsimbalist	Submission (Kimura)	1	3:17	
Welterweight 77 kg	(Russia) Shamil Shikhshabekov	def.	(Russia) Aleksandr Grebnev	Decision (Unanimous)	3	5:00	
Featherweight 66 kg	(Russia) Anzor Chakaev	def.	(Russia) Ruslan Khairulin	TKO (Punches)	1	3:50	
Middleweight 84 kg	(Russia) Dmitriy Aryshev	def.	(Ukraine) Andrey Bragovskiy	TKO (Punches)	2	1:10	
Catchweight 75 kg	(Afghanistan) Wahid Najand	def.	(Russia) Pavel Ardyshev	Decision (Unanimous)	3	5:00	
Catchweight 59 kg	(Russia) Magomedgadzhi Sirazhudinov	def.	(Uzbekistan) Bakhodir Bokiev	KO (Punches)	2	1:09	
Flyweight 57 kg	(Russia) Lenar Suleymanov	def.	(Russia) Dordzhi Daraev	Decision (Unanimous)	3	5:00	
Lightweight 70 kg	(Belarus) Shamil Yakhiyaev	def.	(Uzbekistan) Bobur Ibrahimov	TKO (Punches)	1	1:24	
Welterweight 77 kg	(Russia) Tagir Magomedov	def.	(Russia) Vadim Suleymanov	Decision (Unanimous)	3	5:00	
Flyweight 57 kg	(Russia) Ruslan Satiev	def.	(Russia) Artem Koshansky	TKO (Punches)	1	2:28	

== AMC Fight Nights 101: Primorsky Krai Governor's Cup ==
AMC Fight Nights 101: Primorsky Krai Governor's Cup
- Promotion: AMC Fight Nights
- Date: May 7, 2021
- Venue: Fetisov Arena
- City: Vladivostok, Russia

'AMC Fight Nights 101: Primorsky Krai Governor's Cup' was a mixed martial arts event held by AMC Fight Nights on May 7, 2021, at the Fetisov Arena in Vladivostok, Russia.

=== Background ===
The event featured a middleweight bout that saw Alexander Shlemenko return after seventeen months layoff to headline AMC Fight Nights 101.

=== Results ===
AMC Fight Nights 101
Weight class				Method	Round	Time	Notes
Middleweight 84 kg	(Russia) Alexander Shlemenko	def.	(Brazil) Márcio Santos	Decision (Unanimous)	3	5:00	
Middleweight 84 kg	(Russia) Vyacheslav Babkin	def.	(Russia) Gennady Kovalev	TKO (Punches)	2	4:57	
Welterweight 77 kg	(Russia) Mikhail Doroshenko	def.	(Armenia) David Khachatryan	KO (Punches)	2	1:14	
Catchweight 68 kg	(Russia) Alexandr Osetrov	def.	(Russia) Konstantin Kiriev	TKO (Punches)	1	3:03	
Heavyweight 120 kg	(Russia) Denis Arkhireev	def.	(Russia) Denis Podyninogin	TKO (Corner Stoppage)	3	2:04	
Catchweight 68 kg	(Russia) Magomedshapi Gasayniev	def.	(Russia) Sergey Kuznetsov	Decision (Unanimous)	3	5:00	
Bantamweight 61 kg	(Azerbaijan) Magherram Gasanzadeh	def.	(Russia) Yuri Aleksandrov	TKO (Punches)	1	3:32	
Middleweight 84 kg	(Russia) Aleksandr Chemaev	def.	(Russia) Ruslan Yarochkin	TKO (Punches)	1	3:24	

== AMC Fight Nights 102 ==
AMC Fight Nights 102
- Promotion: AMC Fight Nights
- Date: June 18, 2021
- Venue: Ivan Yarygin Sports Palace
- City: Krasnoyarsk, Russia

'AMC Fight Nights 102' was a mixed martial arts event held by AMC Fight Nights on June 4, 2021, in Krasnoyarsk, Russia.

=== Background ===
A light-heavyweight title bout contested by the reigning champion Armen Petrosyan and Hasan Yousefi served as the event headliner.

A middleweight bout between David Barkhudaryan and the former M-1 Global Light Heavyweight champion Vyacheslav Vasilevsky was announced as the co-main event.

=== Results ===
AMC Fight Nights 102
Weight class				Method	Round	Time	Notes
Light Heavyweight 93 kg	(Iran) Hasan Yousefi	def.	(Armenia) Armen Petrosyan (c)	TKO (Punches)	1	1:02	For the AMC Fight Nights Light Heavyweight Championship
Middleweight 84 kg	(Armenia) David Barkhudaryan	def.	(Russia) Vyacheslav Vasilevsky	TKO (Punches)	1	3:05	
Welterweight 77 kg	(Russia) Makxim Butorin	def.	(Russia) Makhmud Gaziev	TKO (Punches)	2	4:04	
Lightweight 70 kg	(Kazakhstan) Muratbek Kasymbay	def.	(Russia) Vasily Kozlov	Submission (Triangle Choke)	1	1:34	
Flyweight 57 kg	(Russia) Vladimir Alekseev	def.	(Tajikistan) Firdavs Zaripov	TKO (Punches)	2	4:16	
Flyweight 57 kg	(Russia) Zayundin Suleymanov	def.	(Brazil) Rildeci Dias	KO (Punches)	2	3:26	
Featherweight 66 kg	(Russia) Murad Nukkhadiev	def.	(Russia) Mikhail Tarkhanov	TKO (Punches)	3	3:08	
Bantamweight 61 kg	(Russia) Magerram Gasanzade	def.	(Russia) Konstantin Podoynitsyn	Decision (Unanimous)	3	5:00	
Light Heavyweight 93 kg	(Russia) Viktor Vecherin	def.	(Russia) Ilya Gunenko	Decision (Unanimous)	3	5:00	
Middleweight 84 kg	(Russia) Mikhail Allakhverdian	def.	(Russia) Richard Totrov	Decision (Split)	3	5:00	
Lightweight 70 kg	(Russia) Gusein Gadzhiev	def.	(Russia) Denis Andriyanov	Submission (Rear-Naked Choke)	2	1:54	
Featherweight 66 kg	(Russia) Tumer Ondar	def.	(Tajikistan) Murodali Salimov	TKO (Punches)	2	2:33	

== AMC Fight Nights 103 ==
AMC Fight Nights 103
- Promotion: AMC Fight Nights
- Date: July 15, 2021
- Venue: WOW Arena
- City: Sochi, Russia

AMC Fight Nights 103 was a mixed martial arts event held by AMC Fight Nights on July 15, 2021, in Sochi, Russia.

=== Background ===
The event was headlined by a welterweight bout between the former ACB featherweight champion Yusuf Raisov and Alexey Makhno.

Moris Boleyan was scheduled to make his first AMC flyweight title defense against the undefeated Azizkhan Chorshanbiev.

=== Results ===
AMC Fight Nights 103
Weight class				Method	Round	Time	Notes
Welterweight 77 kg	(Russia) Yusuf Raisov	def.	(Russia) Alekxey Makhno	TKO (Corner Stoppage)	2	0:54	
Catchweight 68 kg	(Russia) Mukhammed Eminov	def.	(Belarus) Makxim Pugachyov	Decision (Unanimous)	3	5:00	
Flyweight 57 kg	(Armenia) Moris Boleyan (c)	def.	(Tajikistan) Azizkhan Chorshanbiev	Submission (Triangle Choke)	1	3:17	For the AMC Fight Nights Flyweight Championship
Welterweight 77 kg	(Russia) Artur Pronin	def.	(Russia) Magomed Isaev	Submission (Triangle Choke)	2	2:52	
Featherweight 66 kg	(Kazakhstan) Aslan Oraz	-	(Russia) Gleb Khabibullin	Draw (Split)	3	5:00	
Heavyweight 120 kg	(Russia) Kazbek Saidaliev	def.	(Russia) Dmitry Andryushko	Decision (Unanimous)	3	5:00	
Welterweight 77 kg	(Russia) Sergey Denisov	def.	(Russia) Aleksandr Grebnev	TKO (Doctor Stoppage)	3	1:00	
Light Heavyweight 93 kg	(Russia) Akhmad Gasanov	def.	(Russia) Artur Aliskerov	TKO (Punches)	2	4:13	
Middleweight 84 kg	(Russia) Sharabutdin Magomedov	def.	(Russia) Yakub Kediev	TKO (Knees to the Body)	1	2:35	
Lightweight 70 kg	(Russia) Magomed Sulumov	def.	(Kyrgyzstan) Zhyldyzbek Syimyk	Decision (Unanimous)	3	5:00	
Middleweight 84 kg	(Russia) Sergey Khrisanov	def.	(Russia) Vladimir Ivashkin	Decision (Unanimous)	3	5:00	
Heavyweight 120 kg	(Russia) Yusup Shuaev	def.	(Georgia (country)) David Kitiya	TKO (Punches)	1	1:33	
Welterweight 77 kg	(Russia) Islam Kartlykov	def.	(Russia) Maksim Rakovskyi	TKO (Punches)	1	4:46	
Catchweight 68 kg	(Uzbekistan) Furkat Komilov	def.	(Russia) Ivan Kozachenko	Decision (Unanimous)	3	5:00	
Catchweight 64 kg	(Russia) Anzhor Abzhamov	def.	(Russia) Magomedzakir Amirchupanov	Submission (Triangle Choke)	1	0:50	

== AMC Fight Nights: Abdulmanap Nurmagomedov Memory Tournament ==
AMC Fight Nights: Abdulmanap Nurmagomedov Memory Tournament
- Promotion: AMC Fight Nights
- Date: September 17, 2021
- Venue: Crocus Expo Arena
- City: Moscow, Russia

'AMC Fight Nights: Abdulmanap Nurmagomedov Memory Tournament' was a mixed martial arts event held by Fight Nights Global in association with Eagle Fighting Championship on September 17, 2021, at Crocus Expo Arena in Moscow, Russia.

=== Background ===
The main event featured an AMC lightweight championship bout between the reigning champion Nariman Abbasov and the contender Shamil Zavurov. The bout was the last of Zavurov.

=== Results ===
AMC Fight Nights
Weight class				Method	Round	Time	Notes
Lightweight 70 kg	(Azerbaijan) Nariman Abbasov	def.	(Russia) Shamil Zavurov	KO (Punches)	1	4:13	For the AMC Fight Nights Lightweight Championship
Welterweight 77 kg	(Tajikistan) Samandar Murodov	def.	(Ukraine) Maxim Shvets	TKO (Punches)	4	4:43	For the EFC Welterweight Championship
Welterweight 77 kg	(Russia) Saygid Izagakhmaev	def.	(Russia) Maxim Butorin	Submission (Rear-Naked Choke)	2	4:40	
Welterweight 77 kg	(Tajikistan) Nurullo Aliev	def.	(Ukraine) Kirill Krikunov	Decision (Unanimous)	3	5:00	
Middleweight 84 kg	(Turkey) Ibragim Chuzhigaev	def.	(Russia) Evgeny Myakinkin	TKO (Punches)	3	2:47	
Featherweight 66 kg	(Russia) Dinislam Kamavov	def.	(Kazakhstan) Konstantin Cherednichenko	TKO (Punches)	1	0:58	
Featherweight 66 kg	(Russia) Timur Khizriev	def.	(Tajikistan) Ruslan Ryskul	Technical Submission (Guillotine Choke)	1	3:06	
Bantamweight 61 kg	(Kazakhstan) Sabit Zhusupov	def.	(Kyrgyzstan) Nurbek Abdykadyrov	Decision (Unanimous)	3	5:00	
Bantamweight 61 kg	(Russia) Imran Satiev	def.	(Tajikistan) Rustam Machidov	TKO (Punches)	1	3:23	
Flyweight 57 kg	(Russia) Israil Gadzhiagaev	def.	(Russia) Arzhaan Chylbak	Decision (Unanimous)	3	5:00	
Welterweight 77 kg	(Russia) Maor Maasiaev	def.	(Uzbekistan) Omadzhon Otazhonov	Submission (Rear-Naked Choke)	1	4:52	
Catchweight 59 kg	(Russia) Sheykhakhmat Tokaev	def.	(Uzbekistan) Shakhzod Abdurakhmonov	TKO (Punches)	1	1:11	

== AMC Fight Nights 104 ==
AMC Fight Nights 104
- Promotion: AMC Fight Nights
- Date: September 24, 2021
- Venue: WOW Arena
- City: Sochi, Russia

AMC Fight Nights 104 was a mixed martial arts event held by AMC Fight Nights on September 24, 2021, at the WOW Arena in Sochi, Russia.

=== Background ===
The main event featured a catchweight bout between Marif Piraev and Kuat Khamitov.

=== Results ===
AMC Fight Nights 104
Weight class				Method	Round	Time	Notes
Catchweight 75 kg	(Russia) Marif Piraev	def.	(Kazakhstan) Kuat Khamitov	Decision (Unanimous)	3	5:00	
Heavyweight 120 kg	(Russia) Shamil Gaziev	def.	(Russia) Grigoriy Ponomarev	TKO (Punches)	2	0:38	
Featherweight 66 kg	(Brazil) Taigro Costa	def.	(Russia) Sultanali Davudov	Decision (Majority)	3	5:00	
Catchweight 63 kg	(Russia) Goga Shamatava	def.	(Brazil) Gustavo Erak	Decision (Unanimous)	3	5:00	
Catchweight 63 kg	(Russia) Khizbula Khabirov	def.	(Russia) Petr Berg	Decision (Unanimous)	3	5:00	
Welterweight 70 kg	(Russia) Azamat Dzhigkaev	def.	(Russia) Yuriy Ermolenko	TKO (Doctor Stoppage)	2	5:00	
Featherweight 66 kg	(Russia) Rustam Teuvazhukov	def.	(Uzbekistan) Shakhriyor Panjiev	Submission (Choke)	1	2:25	
Light Heavyweight 93 kg	(Russia) Satrudin Vakhidov	def.	(Russia) Khanilav Khanilaev	TKO (Doctor Stoppage)	1	5:00	
Lightweight 70 kg	(Russia) Saygidguseyn Surkhaev	def.	(Russia) Stanislav Slavyanov	Submission (Guillotine Choke)	2	0:51	
Welterweight 77 kg	(Russia) Ramazan Gasanov	def.	(Russia) Mahmud Gaziev	TKO (Retirement)	2	5:00	
Featherweight 66 kg	(Russia) Magomed Kadiev	def.	(Kazakhstan) Nurbek Kabdrakhmanov	Decision (Unanimous)	3	5:00	
Welterweight 77 kg	(Russia) Gadzhimurad Amirzhanov	def.	(Uzbekistan) Shokhrukhbek Latifjonov	TKO (Doctor Stoppage)	1	2:13	
Featherweight 66 kg	(Russia) Shamil Magomedov	def.	(Uzbekistan) Farokhiddin Abduraimov	Submission (Rear-Naked Choke)	1	1:25	
Lightweight 70 kg	(Uzbekistan) Turdali Turgunboev	def.	(Russia) Ruslan Barkalaev	TKO (Doctor Stoppage)	2	5:00	

== AMC Fight Nights 105 ==
AMC Fight Nights 105
- Promotion: AMC Fight Nights
- Date: October 16, 2021
- Venue: WOW Arena
- City: Sochi, Russia

AMC Fight Nights 105 was a mixed martial arts event held by AMC Fight Nights on October 16, 2021, at the WOW Arena in Sochi, Russia.

=== Background ===
A middleweight title bout between the champion Vladimir Mineev and title challenger Magomed Ismailov served as the event headliner.

=== Results ===
AMC Fight Nights 105
Weight class				Method	Round	Time	Notes
Middleweight 84 kg	(Russia) Vladimir Mineev (c)	def.	(Russia) Magomed Ismailov	TKO (Punches)	3	4:40	For the AMC Fight Nights Middleweight Championship
Light Heavyweight 93 kg	(Russia) Vagab Vagabov	def.	(Iran) Hasan Yousefi (c)	KO (Punch)	3	0:29	For the AMC Fight Nights Light Heavyweight Championship
Featherweight 66 kg	(Russia) Mukhamed Eminov (c)	def.	(Russia) Roman Silagadze	Submission (Guillotine Choke)	1	2:28	For the AMC Fight Nights Featherweight Championship
Catchweight 90 kg	(Russia) Artur Alibulatov	def.	(Russia) David Barkhudaryan	TKO (Punches)	2	1:19	
Catchweight 81 kg	(Russia) Alexey Makhno	def.	(Armenia) Viktor Azatyan	Decision (Unanimous)	3	5:00	
Middleweight 84 kg	(Russia) Sharaputdin Magomedov	def.	(Armenia) Mikhail Allakhverdian	KO (Elbow)	1	4:41	
Lightweight 70 kg	(Russia) Magomed Sulumov	def.	(Russia) Shamil Michilov	KO (Punch)	2	1:30	
Catchweight 67.5 kg	(Russia) Anzor Chakaev	def.	(Tajikistan) Vokhidchon Surobov	Decision (Unanimous)	3	5:00	
Catchweight 72 kg	(Russia) Soslan Gagloev	def.	(Russia) Isa Isaev	TKO (Punches)	3	3:42	
Catchweight 96 kg	(Russia) Akhmed Akhmedov	def.	(Russia) Magomed Akhmedilov	TKO (Elbows and Punches)	2	3:21	

== AMC Fight Nights 106 ==
AMC Fight Nights 106
- Promotion: AMC Fight Nights
- Date: November 27, 2021
- City: Syktyvkar, Russia

AMC Fight Nights 106 was a mixed martial arts event held by AMC Fight Nights on November 27, 2021, in Syktyvkar, Russia.

=== Background ===
A middleweight bout between Vyacheslav Vasilevsky and Márcio Santos was slated to serve as the event headliner. However, the Russian was have to withdraw for this event due to illness. On November 18, it is announced that Santos will fought against Alexander Emelianenko.

=== Results ===
AMC Fight Nights 106
Weight Class				Method	Round	Time	Notes
Heavyweight 120 kg	(Brazil) Márcio Santos	def.	(Russia) Alexander Emelianenko	Submission (Arm-Triangle Choke)	1	4:00	
Catchweight 81 kg	(Russia) Maxim Butorin	def.	(Russia) Vladimir Migovich	Submission (Rear-Naked Choke)	3	4:52	
Welterweight 77 kg	(Russia) Oleg Kosinov	def.	(Russia) Artur Pronin	KO (Punch to the Body)	2	3:05	
Middleweight 84 kg	(Russia) Sharaputdin Magomedov	def.	(Brazil) Joel dos Santos	KO (Head Kick)	2	0:13	
Light Heavyweight 93 kg	(Russia) Ahmad Gasanov	def.	(Russia) Viktor Vecherin	Decision (Split)	3	5:00	
Bantamweight 61 kg	(Russia) Gegorg Kirakosyan	def.	(Russia) Sheyk-Akhmat Tokaev	Decision (Unanimous)	3	5:00	
Bantamweight 61 kg	(Russia) Albert Misikov	def.	(Russia) Vadim Malygin	KO (Punches)	1	2:56	
Welterweight 77 kg	(Russia) Aleksandr Grebnev	def.	(Russia) Artem Yamschitov	Decision (Unanimous)	3	5:00	
Lightweight 70 kg	(Russia) Vasily Kozlov	def.	(Russia) Tamerlan Ashakhanov	Decision (Unanimous)	3	5:00	
Light Heavyweight 93 kg	(Russia) Alexander Piskun	def.	(Russia) Nikita Burchak	TKO (Punches)	1	0:22	
Flyweight 57 kg	(Azerbaijan) Inal Hasbulatov	def.	(Russia) Eltun Mamedov	Submission (D'arce Choke)	1	4:20	
Featherweight 66 kg	(Russia) Ali Razhbudinov	def.	(Kyrgyzstan) Islyar Aliev	Submission (Guillotine Choke)	1	1:47	
Catchweight 73 kg	(Russia) Aleksey Ilyenko	def.	(Russia) Dalgat Magomedragimov	KO (Head Kick)	2	4:30	

== AMC Fight Nights 107 ==
AMC Fight Nights 107
- Promotion: AMC Fight Nights
- Date: December 20, 2021
- City: Minsk, Belarus

AMC Fight Nights 107 was a mixed martial arts event held by AMC Fight Nights on December 20, 2021, in Minsk, Belarus.

=== Results ===
AMC Fight Nights 107
Weight class				Method	Round	Time	Notes
Catchweight 80 kg	(Belarus) Ruslan Kolodko	def.	(Russia) Alexey Makhno	TKO (Knee and Punches)	2	2:41	
Middleweight 84 kg	(Russia) Artem Zemlyakov	-	(Belarus) Sergey Chmel	Draw (Split)	3	5:00	
Heavyweight 120 kg	(Russia) Grigory Ponomarev	def.	(Iran) Alireza Safara	TKO (Punches)	1	3:29	
Middleweight 84 kg	(Belarus) Igor Litoshik	def.	(Russia) Sergey Khrisanov	Submission (Guillotine Choke)	2	3:41	
Catchweight 60 kg	(Russia) Ruslan Satiev	def.	(Belarus) Artem Lukyanov	Submission (Rear-Naked Choke)	1	2:57	
Preliminary card
Lightweight 70 kg	(Belarus) Yuri Satsuk	def.	(Belarus) Egor Drozd	KO (Knees)	1	1:16	Kickboxing
Catchweight 81 kg	(Russia) Khamzat Chapanov	def.	(Belarus) Vladislav Trusevich	KO (Spinning Back Kick)	1	0:31	
Catchweight 63 kg	(Russia) Ilyas Eziev	def.	(Belarus) Ivan Semenyuk	KO (Punches)	1	0:13	
Welterweight 77 kg	(Russia) Rasul Kadiev	def.	(Belarus) Denis Ashmarov	KO (Punch)	2	0:46	
Catchweight 78 kg	(Belarus) Pavel Shelest	def.	(Russia) Mikhail Stashko	TKO (Doctor Stoppage)	1	1:54	Kickboxing
Welterweight 77 kg	(Russia) Kamalutdin Guseynov	def.	(Russia) Artur Saetgareev	TKO (Punches)	1	1:34	
Catchweight 65 kg	(Russia) Aleksandr Vavilov	def.	(Belarus) Artem Belanovskiy	Decision (Ext.r Unanimous)	4	3:00	Kickboxing
Catchweight 89 kg	(Russia) Stanislav Klybik	def.	(Uzbekistan) Gairat Usmondjanov	KO (Head Kick)	1	1:20	

== See also ==
- 2021 in UFC
- 2021 in Bellator MMA
- 2021 in ONE Championship
- 2021 in Rizin Fighting Federation
- 2021 in Konfrontacja Sztuk Walki
- 2021 in Absolute Championship Akhmat
- 2021 in Legacy Fighting Alliance
