= 2020 in Fight Nights Global =

Information
- First date: March 1, 2020

Events

Fights

Chronology
2019 in Fight Nights Global	2020 in Fight Nights Global	2021 in Fight Nights Global

The year 2020 was the 10th year in the history of the Fight Nights Global, a mixed martial arts promotion based in Russia. The company continues broadcasts through Match TV and Fight Network.

== List of events ==
#	Event Title	Date	Arena	Location
1	Festival Stepping into Immortality	March 1, 2020	DIVS	Ekaterinburg, Russia
2	MMA Festival: 75th Anniversary of the Great Victory	August 28, 2020	KSK Express	Rostov on Don, Russia
3	Fight Nights Global & GFC: Abdulmanap Nurmagomedov Memory Tournament	September 9, 2020	Irina Viner-Usmanova Gymnastics Palace	Moscow, Russia
4	Fight Nights Global 97	September 19, 2020		Elista, Russia
5	Fight Nights Global 98: Amirov vs Bikrev	September 25, 2020		Moscow, Russia
6	AMC Fight Nights Global: Winter Cup	December 24, 2020	Basket Hall	Moscow, Russia
7	AMC Fight Nights Global 99	December 25, 2020	Basket Hall	Moscow, Russia

== Festival Stepping into Immortality ==
Festival Stepping into Immortality
- Promotion: Fight Nights Global
- Date: March 01, 2020
- Venue: DIVS
- City: Yekaterinburg, Russia

Festival Stepping into Immortality was a mixed martial arts event held by Fight Nights Global on March 1, 2020 at the Dynamo Palace Of Sports in Yekaterinburg, Russia.

=== Fight Card ===
Weight Class				Method	Round	Time	Notes
Featherweight 66 kg	(Russia) Mukhamed Eminov	def.	(Russia) Aleksandr Grozin	Decision (Unanimous)	5	5:00	For the Fight Nights Featherweight Championship
Welterweight 77 kg	(Russia) Aleksandr Abramov	def.	(Russia) Talip Khalilov	Decision (Split)	5	3:00	Kickboxing
Bantamweight 61 kg	(Georgia (country)) Suradzhi Gasanov	def.	(Russia) Galamirza Ayvazov	Decision (Unanimous)	3	5:00	
Middleweight 84 kg	(Russia) Timofey Vedernikov	def.	(Russia) Ilya Bogomolov	TKO (Punches)	2	3:30	
Bantamweight 61 kg	(Russia) Kuanysh Aleksandrov		(Russia) Ernest Sadykov	Draw (Split)	3	5:00	

== MMA Festival: 75th Anniversary of the Great Victory ==
MMA Festival: 75th Anniversary of the Great Victory
- Promotion: Fight Nights Global
- Date: August 28, 2020
- Venue: KSK Express
- City: Rostov on Don, Russia

MMA Festival: 75th Anniversary of the Great Victory was a mixed martial arts event held by Fight Nights Global on August 28, 2020 at the KSK Express in Rostov on Don, Russia.

=== Fight Card ===
Weight Class				Method	Round	Time	Notes
Light heavyweight 93 kg	(Armenia) Armen Petrosyan	def.	(Russia) Artur Aliskerov	TKO (Punches)	2	3:32	For the Fight Nights Light Heavyweight Championship
Welterweight 77 kg	(Ukraine) Renat Lyatifov	def.	(Belarus) Boris Miroshnichenko	Submission (Rear-Naked Choke)	3	3:20	
Middleweight 84 kg	(Russia) Shamil Magomedov	def.	(Georgia (country)) Nodar Kudukhashvili	Decision (Unanimous)	3	5:00	
Welterweight 77 kg	(Russia) Artur Sviridov	def.	(Armenia) Hovhannes Abgaryan	Decision (Unanimous)	3	5:00	
Light heavyweight 93 kg	(Ukraine) Yuri Kiselov	def.	(Russia) Timur Magdiev	TKO (Punches)	1	2:12	
Featherweight 66 kg	(Russia) Shamil Gasanov	def.	(Russia) Said Khatiev	Decision (Unanimous)	3	5:00	
Bantamweight 61 kg	(Russia) Sharamazan Chupanov	def.	(Russia) Aslanbek Karov	Decision (Unanimous)	3	5:00	
Lightweight 70 kg	(Russia) Valery Gritsutin	def.	(Ukraine) Sergey Prokopyuk	Submission (Guillotine Choke)	3	3:13	
Lightweight 70 kg	(Russia) Bulach Magomedov	def.	(Russia) Tornike Svanidze	Submission (Guillotine Choke)	1	3:56	
Bantamweight 61 kg	(Kyrgyzstan) Adilet Begaliev	def.	(Russia) Yuri Roschin	Submission (Rear-Naked Choke)	1	4:46	
Flyweight 57 kg	(Russia) Rustam Mavlyudov	def.	(Ukraine) Vladislav Malakhov	Submission (Rear-Naked Choke)	1	4:02	

== Fight Nights Global & GFC: Abdulmanap Nurmagomedov Memory Tournament ==
Fight Nights Global & GFC: Abdulmanap Nurmagomedov Memory Tournament
- Promotion: Fight Nights Global
- Date: September 09, 2020
- City: Moscow, Russia

'Fight Nights Global & GFC: Abdulmanap Nurmagomedov Memory Tournament' was a mixed martial arts event held by Fight Nights Global on September 9, 2020 at the Irina Viner-Usmanova Gymnastics Palace in Moscow, Russia.

=== Fight Card ===
Weight Class				Method	Round	Time	Notes
Middleweight 84 kg	(Russia) Vladimir Mineev	def.	(Kazakhstan) Dauren Ermekov	TKO (Elbows and Knee)	3	2:16	For the Fight Nights Middleweight Championship
Lightweight 70 kg	(Russia) Usman Nurmagomedov	def.	(Russia) Svyatoslav Shabanov	TKO (Punches)	2	3:37	
Featherweight 66 kg	(Russia) Mukhamed Eminov (c)	def.	(Kazakhstan) Muratbek Kasymbay	Decision (Unanimous)	5	5:00	For the Fight Nights Featherweight Championship
Featherweight 66 kg	(Russia) Ivan Eremenko	def.	(Russia) Al Abdullah Magomedov	KO (Punch)	2	0:53	
Preliminary Card
Welterweight 77 kg	(Kazakhstan) Goity Dazaev	def.	(Russia) Maxim Butorin	TKO (Doctor Stoppage)	3	1:39	
Bantamweight 61 kg	(Kazakhstan) Sabit Zhusupov	def.	(Brazil) Rildeci Dias	TKO (Punches)	3	2:05	
Welterweight 77 kg	(Russia) Artur Pronin	def.	(Russia) Ivan Shpedt	Decision (Unanimous)	3	5:00	
Featherweight 66 kg	(Russia) Khasan Magomedsharipov	def.	(Georgia (country)) Timur Akaba	Submission (Rear-Naked Choke)	1	3:48	
Heavyweight 120 kg	(Russia) Yusup Shuaev	def.	(Russia) Telman Sherifov	TKO (Punches)	1	3:36	
Heavyweight 120 kg	(Kazakhstan) Darkhan Bakenov	def.	(Ukraine) Vladimir Brik	TKO (Punches and Elbows)	1	2:58	
Bantamweight 61 kg	(Russia) Nikita Boltabaev	def.	(Kazakhstan) Azamat Markabaev	Decision (Unanimous)	3	5:00	
Flyweight 57 kg	(Russia) Shamil Iraskhanov	def.	(Kyrgyzstan) Nursultan Abdurasul Uulu	Decision (Unanimous)	3	5:00	
Welterweight 77 kg	(Russia) Shakhban Alkhasov	def.	(Kyrgyzstan) Orozbek Imamali Uulu	Submission (Rear-Naked Choke)	1	1:41	
Featherweight 66 kg	(Russia) Roman Silagadze	def.	(Russia) David Lobanov	Submission (Shoulder Lock)	1	3:18	
Catchweight 79 kg	(Georgia (country)) Gela Beridze	def.	(Uzbekistan) Doston Bozorov	Submission (Heel Hook)	1	1:21	
Bantamweight 61 kg	(Kazakhstan) Sultan Zholdoshbekov	def.	(Armenia) Grant Akopyan	TKO (Injury)	1	5:00	

== Fight Nights Global 97 ==
Fight Nights Global 97
- Promotion: Fight Nights Global
- Date: September 19, 2020
- City: Elista, Russia

Fight Nights Global 97 was a mixed martial arts event held by Fight Nights Global on September 19, 2020 in Elista, Russia.

=== Fight Card ===
Weight Class				Method	Round	Time	Notes
Lightweight 70 kg	(Tajikistan) Chorshanbe Chorshanbiev	def.	(Russia) Radomir Filippov	Decision (Unanimous)	3	5:00	
heavyweight 120 kg	(Russia) Oleg Popov	def.	(Russia) Baga Agaev	Decision (Unanimous)	3	5:00	
Lightweight 70 kg	(Russia) Alexey Makhno	def.	(Kazakhstan) Adil Boranbayev	Decision (Unanimous)	3	5:00	
Flyweight 57 kg	(Armenia) Moris Boleyan	def.	(Russia) Bair Asalkhanov	Submission (Guillotine Choke)	1	4:08	
Bantamweight 61 kg	(Russia) Dordzhi Daraev	def.	(Russia) Petr Dmitriev	Submission (Heel Hook)	1	4:34	
Welterweight 77 kg	(Russia) Alexey Aranzaev	def.	(Russia) David Vasilevskiy	TKO (Punches)	3	3:54	
Bantamweight 61 kg	(Russia) Rustam Tevazhukov	def.	(Russia) Valeriy Vidunov	TKO (Punches)	3	2:05	
Featherweight 66 kg	(Kazakhstan) Valeriy Davaev	def.	(Kazakhstan) Asker Eskerov	Submission (Heel Hook)	1	2:01	

== Fight Nights Global 98: Amirov vs Bikrev ==
Fight Nights Global 98: Amirov vs Bikrev
- Promotion: Fight Nights Global
- Date: September 25, 2020
- City: Moscow, Russia

Fight Nights Global 98: Amirov vs Bikrev was a mixed martial arts event held by Fight Nights Global on September 25, 2020 in Moscow, Russia.

=== Fight Card ===
Weight Class				Method	Round	Time	Notes
Welterweight 77 kg	(Russia) Shamil Amirov	def.	(Russia) Dmitry Bikrev (c)	No Contest (Overturned by Promoter)	3	2:48	For the Fight Nights Welterweight Championship
Lightweight 70 kg	(Azerbaijan) Nariman Abbasov (c)	def.	(Georgia (country)) Mikhail Gogitidze	Submission (Rear-Naked Choke)	2	1:10	For the Fight Nights Lightweight Championship
Catchweight 74 kg	(Kazakhstan) Kuat Khamitov	def.	(Russia) Akhmadkhan Bokov	Submission (Rear-Naked Choke)	1	2:27	
Middleweight 84 kg	(Moldova) Andrei Ciubotaru	def.	(Russia) Yuriy Ermolenko	Decision (Unanimous)	3	5:00	
Welterweight 77 kg	(Ukraine) Andrey Bragovskiy	def.	(Russia) Magomed Sheikhmagomedov	KO (Front Kick)	3	2:42	
Welterweight 77 kg	(Russia) Kirill Kryukov	def.	(Russia) Vasiliy Zubkov	Decision (Unanimous)	3	5:00	
Welterweight 77 kg	(Russia) Aleksandr Vasiliev	def.	(Russia) Nikolay Bitter	Submission (Triangle Choke)	1	4:20	
Heavyweight 120 kg	(Russia) Sultan Murtazaliev	def.	(Kazakhstan) Akbar Tairov	Submission (Rear-Naked Choke)	1	4:03	
Heavyweight 120 kg	(Belarus) Timofey Mishev	def.	(Russia) Akhmed Bazaev	Submission (Keylock)	2	2:56	
Lightweight 70 kg	(Belarus) Ilya Khodkevich	def.	(Russia) Kurbanali Isabekov	Decision (Unanimous)	3	5:00	
Middleweight 84 kg	(Russia) Maksim Tsapenko	def.	(Russia) Nikita Prytkov	TKO (Punches)	3	0:52	
Flyweight 57 kg	(Russia) Vladimir Alekseev	def.	(Kyrgyzstan) Adilet Begaliev	Submission (Rear-Naked Choke)	2	3:12	
Featherweight66 kg	(Russia) Magomedshapi Gasayniev	def.	(Kazakhstan) Arman Saparov	TKO (Punches)	1	1:02	
Lightweight 70 kg	(Russia) Boris Magomedov	def.	(Russia) Vasiliy Sokolov	Submission (Triangle Choke)	1	0:55	
Lightweight 70 kg	(Russia) Filipp Kosyrev	def.	(Russia) Pavel Sundukov	Submission (Armbar)	2	4:42	
Catchweight 73 kg	(Russia) Shamil Michilov	def.	(Tajikistan) Ramazon Hofizzoda	Submission (Guillotine Choke)	1	0:51	
Welterweight 77 kg	(Russia) Shamil Shikhshabekov	def.	(Russia) Vladimir Osipov	Submission (Rear-Naked Choke)	1	3:47	
W.Strawweight 52 kg	(Russia) Viktoriya Dudakova	def.	(Russia) Irina Degtyareva	Submission (Armbar)	3	2:49	

== AMC Fight Nights Global: Winter Cup ==
AMC Fight Nights Global: Winter Cup
- Promotion: Fight Nights Global
- Date: December 24, 2020
- Venue: Basket Hall
- City: Moscow, Russia

AMC Fight Nights Global: Winter Cup was a mixed martial arts event held by Fight Nights Global on December 24, 2020 at Basket Hall in Moscow, Russia.

=== Fight Card ===
Weight Class				Method	Round	Time	Notes
Middleweight 84 kg	(Russia) Vyacheslav Vasilevsky	def.	(Uzbekistan) Bogdan Guskov	TKO (Punches)	1	3:01	
Middleweight 84 kg	(Russia) Shamil Magomedov	def.	(Russia) Movsar Bokov	Decision (Unanimous)	3	5:00	
Light heavyweight 93 kg	(Russia) Vagab Vagabov	def.	(Russia) Dmitriy Andryushko	TKO (Corner Stoppage)	3	0:00	
Welterweight 77 kg	(Tajikistan) Nurullo Aliev	def.	(Russia) Aleksandr Grebnev	Decision (Unanimous)	3	5:00	
Welterweight 77 kg	(Russia) Oleg Kosinov	def.	(Russia) Ivan Shpedt	Decision (Unanimous)	3	5:00	
Flyweight 57 kg	(Uzbekistan) Bakhodir Bakiev	def.	(Brazil) Denilson Matos	Decision (Unanimous)	3	5:00	
Heavyweight 120 kg	(Russia) Vyacheslav Ryabov	def.	(Iran) Alireza Safara	TKO	2	3:04	
Flyweight 57 kg	(Russia) Imran Satiev	def.	(Ukraine) Oleg Levin	Decision (Unanimous)	3	5:00	
Middleweight 84 kg	(Russia) Islam Kartlykov	def.	(Azerbaijan) Emil Akhmadov	TKO (Punches)	2	3:28	
Bantamweight 61 kg	(Tajikistan) Sarvadzhon Khamidov	def.	(Russia) Aslan Tovsultanov	Decision (Unanimous)	3	5:00	
Featherweight 66 kg	(Tajikistan) Azizkhan Chorshanbiev	def.	(Russia) Amirkhan Oev	TKO (Punches)	1	2:15	
Bantamweight 61 kg	(Russia) Vladimir Alekseev	def.	(Russia) Ramzan Dzaurov	Decision (Unanimous)	3	5:00	
Flyweight 57 kg	(Russia) Ruslan Satiev	def.	(Belarus) Mikhail Bitel	TKO (Punches)	1	0:47	
Bantamweight 61 kg	(Azerbaijan) Magerram Gasanzade	def.	(Russia) Murad Malamagomedov	Decision (Unanimous)	3	5:00	
Featherweight 66 kg	(Russia) Isa Isaev	def.	(Russia) Danila Rengevich	TKO (Punches)	2	2:20	
Welterweight 77 kg	(Russia) Magomed Chopanov	def.	(Russia) Vladimir Kozlov	TKO (Knees)	1	2:59	
Heavyweight 120 kg	(Russia) Aleksandr Yaroslavkin	def.	(Russia) Aleksey Safonov	TKO (Injury)	1	2:46	

== AMC Fight Nights Global 99 ==
AMC Fight Nights Global 99
- Promotion: Fight Nights Global
- Date: December 25, 2020
- City: Moscow, Russia

AMC Fight Nights Global 99 was a mixed martial arts event held by Fight Nights Global on December 25, 2020 in Moscow, Russia.

=== Fight Card ===
Weight Class				Method	Round	Time	Notes
Featherweight 66 kg	(Russia) Mukhamed Eminov (c)	def.	(Russia) Akhmed Balkizov	Decision (Split)	5	5:00	For the Fight Nights Featherweight Championship
Welterweight 77 kg	(Russia) Alexey Makhno	def.	(Armenia) David Khachatryan	Submission	1	4:43	
Welterweight 77 kg	(Russia) Maxim Butorin	def.	(Russia) Artur Pronin	TKO	2	0:39	
Lightweight 70 kg	(Russia) Vladimir Kuzminykh	def.	(Tajikistan) Ramazon Hofizzoda	Submission (Rear-Naked Choke)	2	2:17	
Lightweight 70 kg	(Iran) Mohammad Heybati	def.	(Kazakhstan) Muratbek Kasymbay	Decision (Split)	3	5:00	
Lightweight 70 kg	(Armenia) Akop Stepanyan	def.	(Georgia (country)) Mikhail Gogitidze	TKO (Punches)	2	0:59	
Middleweight 84 kg	(Russia) David Barkhudaryan	def.	(Russia) Vladimir Radzhabov	TKO (Injury)	1	0:53	
Featherweight 66 kg	(Russia) Khasan Magomedsharipov	def.	(Russia) Mikhail Tarkhanov	TKO (Punches)	1	4:30	
Flyweight 57 kg	(Russia) Dordzhi Daraev	def.	(Russia) Yan Sleptsov	Submission (Heel Hook)	1	1:42	
Heavyweight 120 kg	(Russia) Grigoriy Ponomarev	def.	(Kazakhstan) Shakhmaral Dzhetpisov	TKO (Punches)	1	1:43	
Featherweight 66 kg	(Russia) Timur Khizriev	def.	(Russia) Alexander Belikh	Decision (Unanimous)	3	5:00	
Welterweight 77 kg	(Russia) Aleksandr Vasiliev	def.	(Russia) Denis Dzhibraev	Decision (Unanimous)	3	5:00	
Heavyweight 120 kg	(Russia) Kazbek Saidaliev	def.	(Brazil) Alison Vicente	TKO (Punches)	3	0:50	
Welterweight 77 kg	(Russia) Gadzhimurad Amirzhanov	def.	(Russia) Vasiliy Zubkov	Decision (Unanimous)	3	5:00	
Middleweight 84 kg	(Russia) Vladimir Osipov	def.	(Russia) Maksim Tsapenko	Decision (Unanimous)	3	5:00	
Lightweight 70 kg	(Russia) Ivan Ohlopkov	def.	(Cameroon) Theodore Bela Mvondo	TKO (Submission to Strikes)	1	1:06	
Featherweight 66 kg	(Russia) Akhmadkhan Bokov	def.	(Russia) Dmitriy Shevtsov	TKO (Punches)	1	3:35	

== See also ==
- 2020 in UFC
- 2020 in ONE Championship
- 2020 in Rizin Fighting Federation
- 2020 in Konfrontacja Sztuk Walki
- 2020 in Absolute Championship Akhmat
- 2020 in Legacy Fighting Alliance
