= Armen Petrosyan (fighter) =

Russian-Armenian mixed martial arts (MMA) fighter

- Born: Armen Petrosyan; 3 November 1990 (age 36); Krasnoyarsk, Russian SFSR, Soviet Union
- Other names: Superman
- Nationality: Russian; Armenian
- Height: 6 ft 3 in (1.91 m)
- Weight: 186 lb (84 kg; 13.3 st)
- Division: Light heavyweight Middleweight
- Fighting out of: Yerevan, Armenia
- Team: Academy MMA
- Rank: Honored Master of Sport in Muay Thai
- Years active: 2018–present

Mixed martial arts record
- Total: 17
- Wins: 10
- By knockout: 7
- By decision: 3
- Losses: 7
- By knockout: 2
- By submission: 3
- By decision: 2

Other information
- Mixed martial arts record from Sherdog

Armen Petrosyan (born 3 November 1990) is an Armenian and Russian mixed martial artist. He competed in the Middleweight division of the Ultimate Fighting Championship (UFC). A professional since 2018, he has previously also fought in AMC Fight Nights, where he held the Light Heavyweight Championship.

== Background ==
Petrosyan was born in Krasnoyarsk on 3 November 1990. He holds dual Russian and Armenian citizenship.

Petrosyan competed in the IFMA World Muaythai Championships winning the gold and silver medal in 2015 and 2016 respectively. He competed in the Russian Muay Thai Cup, winning the gold medal in 2017. He also competed in the Russian Muay Thai Championship, winning the silver medal in 2014, 2015 and 2017, as well as the bronze medal in 2016.

== Mixed martial arts career ==
=== Early career and AMC Fight Nights ===
Petrosyan began his career in professional MMA in 2018. He made his debut at the WCSA Combat Ring - Steel Heart 9 tournament where he faced Makhmadsharif Mirzokhodzhaev. Petrosyan won the bout by knockout in the first round.

Petrosyan performed at the Fight Nights Global and WCSA Combat Ring - Steel Heart tournaments. Representing the Haysport team, he defeated fighters such as Dmitry Minakov and Artur Aliskerov.

Petrosyan faced Artur Aliskerov for the Fight Nights Light Heavyweight Championship on 28 August 2020 at MMA Festival: 75th Anniversary of the Great Victory. He won the bout by first-round TKO.

Petrosyan made his first title defense against Dmitry Minakov on 22 January 2021, at Steel Heart XI. He won the bout by knockout in the second round.

Petrosyan faced Hasan Yousefi on 18 June 2021, at AMC Fight Nights 102. He lost the title by first-round TKO.

=== Dana White's Contender Series ===
Petrosyan faced Kaloyan Konev on October 19, 2021, at Dana White's Contender Series 44. He won the bout won via first-round knockout, earning a contract with the UFC.

=== Ultimate Fighting Championship ===
In his UFC debut, Petrosyan faced Gregory Rodrigues on February 26, 2022, at UFC Fight Night: Makhachev vs. Green. He won the fight via controversial split decision in which 10 out of 14 media outlets scored the fight for Rodrigues.

Petrosyan next faced Caio Borralho on July 9, 2022, at UFC Fight Night: dos Anjos vs. Fiziev. He lost the bout by unanimous decision.

Petrosyan faced A.J. Dobson on October 22, 2022, at UFC 280. He won the bout by unanimous decision.

Petrosyan faced Christian Leroy Duncan on June 17, 2023, at UFC on ESPN: Vettori vs. Cannonier. He won the bout by unanimous decision.

Petrosyan was scheduled to face Rodolfo Vieira on November 4, 2023, at UFC Fight Night: Almeida vs. Lewis. However, the bout was scrapped after Petrosyan became ill backstage during the event. The pair was rebooked for UFC Fight Night 236 on February 10, 2024. He lost the bout by submission due to an arm-triangle choke with seconds remaining in the first round.

Petrosyan faced Sharabutdin Magomedov on October 26, 2024 at UFC 308. He lost the fight by a spinning backfist knockout at the end of the second round.

Petrosyan faced Brunno Ferreira on March 8, 2025, at UFC 313. After Petrosyan was deducted one point due to repeated groin strikes, he lost the fight via a triangle armbar submission in the second round.

On March 14, 2025, following three consecutive losses via finish, it was reported that Petrosyan finished up with his recent contract and was not renewed by the UFC.

== Championships and accomplishments ==
- AMC Fight Nights
  - AMC Fight Nights Light Heavyweight Championship (One time)
    - One successful title defense

== Mixed martial arts record ==
Professional record breakdown
| 17 matches | 10 wins | 7 losses |
| By knockout | 7 | 2 |
| By submission | 0 | 3 |
| By decision | 3 | 2 |

| Res. | Record | Opponent | Method | Event | Date | Round | Time | Location | Notes |
|---|---|---|---|---|---|---|---|---|---|
| Loss | 10–7 | Mikhail Kolobegov | Decision (unanimous) | BetCity Fight Nights 136 | April 24, 2026 | 3 | 5:00 | Rostov-on-Don, Russia | Return to Light Heavyweight. |
| Loss | 10–6 | Vladislav Kovalev | Submission (neck crank) | RCC 24 | December 12, 2025 | 2 | 3:11 | Yekaterinburg, Russia | For the RCC Middleweight Championship. |
| Win | 10–5 | Igor Svirid | KO (punches) | Modern Fighting Pankration 260 | October 4, 2025 | 1 | 4:09 | Krasnoyarsk, Russia | |
| Loss | 9–5 | Brunno Ferreira | Submission (triangle armbar) | UFC 313 | March 8, 2025 | 2 | 4:27 | Las Vegas, Nevada, United States | Petrosyan was deducted one point in round 1 due to repeated groin strikes. |
| Loss | 9–4 | Sharabutdin Magomedov | KO (spinning backfists) | UFC 308 | October 26, 2024 | 2 | 4:52 | Abu Dhabi, United Arab Emirates | |
| Loss | 9–3 | Rodolfo Vieira | Submission (arm-triangle choke) | UFC Fight Night: Hermansson vs. Pyfer | February 10, 2024 | 1 | 4:48 | Las Vegas, Nevada, United States | |
| Win | 9–2 | Christian Leroy Duncan | Decision (unanimous) | UFC on ESPN: Vettori vs. Cannonier | June 17, 2023 | 3 | 5:00 | Las Vegas, Nevada, United States | |
| Win | 8–2 | A.J. Dobson | Decision (unanimous) | UFC 280 | October 22, 2022 | 3 | 5:00 | Abu Dhabi, United Arab Emirates | |
| Loss | 7–2 | Caio Borralho | Decision (unanimous) | UFC on ESPN: dos Anjos vs. Fiziev | July 9, 2022 | 3 | 5:00 | Las Vegas, Nevada, United States | |
| Win | 7–1 | Gregory Rodrigues | Decision (split) | UFC Fight Night: Makhachev vs. Green | February 26, 2022 | 3 | 5:00 | Las Vegas, Nevada, United States | |
| Win | 6–1 | Kaloyan Kolev | KO (head kick and punches) | Dana White's Contender Series 44 | October 19, 2021 | 1 | 4:27 | Las Vegas, Nevada, United States | Return to Middleweight. |
| Win | 5–1 | Alexander Zemlyakov | TKO (body kick and punches) | Colosseum MMA: Battle of Champions 22 | July 25, 2021 | 1 | 0:15 | Moscow, Russia | |
| Loss | 4–1 | Hassan Yousefi | TKO (punches) | AMC Fight Nights 102 | June 18, 2021 | 1 | 1:02 | Krasnoyarsk, Russia | Lost the AMC Light Heavyweight Championship. |
| Win | 4–0 | Dmitry Minakov | KO (body kick) | AMC Fight Nights: Steel Heart XI | January 22, 2021 | 2 | 3:09 | Magnitogorsk, Russia | Defended the AMC Light Heavyweight Championship. |
| Win | 3–0 | Artur Aliskerov | TKO (punches) | MMA Festival: 75th Anniversary of the Great Victory | August 28, 2020 | 3 | 3:32 | Rostov-on-Don, Russia | Light Heavyweight debut. Won the AMC Light Heavyweight Championship. |
| Win | 2–0 | Sultan Gizatulin | TKO (head kick) | WCSA Combat Ring 29 | April 26, 2019 | 3 | 2:07 | Magnitogorsk, Russia | |
| Win | 1–0 | Makhmadsharif Mirzokhodzhaev | TKO (punches) | WCSA Combat Ring 27 | October 12, 2018 | 1 | 2:28 | Magnitogorsk, Russia | Middleweight debut. |
