= 2019 in Fight Nights Global =

Information
- First date: April 6, 2019

Events

Fights

Chronology
2018 in Fight Nights Global	2019 in Fight Nights Global	2020 in Fight Nights Global

The year 2019 was the 9th year in the history of the Fight Nights Global, a mixed martial arts promotion based in Russia. The company continues broadcasts through Match TV and Fight Network.

== List of events ==
#	Event title	Date	Arena	Location
1	Fight Nights Global 92: Bagautinov vs. Asatryan	April 6, 2019	Luzhniki Palace of Sports	Moscow, Russia
2	Fight Nights Global 93: Mytyshchi Cup	April 26, 2019	Mytishchi Arena	Mytishchi, Russia
3	Fight Nights Global 94	October 12, 2019	Luzhniki Palace of Sports	Moscow, Russia
4	Fight Nights Global 95	October 19, 2019		Sochi, Russia
5	Fight Nights Global 96	December 28, 2019	Adrenaline Stadium	Moscow, Russia

== Fight Nights Global 92: Bagautinov vs. Asatryan ==
Fight Nights Global 92: Bagautinov vs. Asatryan
- Promotion: Fight Nights Global
- Date: April 06, 2019
- Venue: Dynamo Palace Of Sports
- City: Moscow, Russia

'Fight Nights Global 92: Bagautinov vs. Asatryan' was a mixed martial arts event held by Fight Nights Global on April 06, 2019 at the Dynamo Palace Of Sports in Moscow, Russia.

=== Fight Card ===
Weight Class				Method	Round	Time	Notes
Flyweight 57 kg	(Russia) Ali Bagautinov	def.	(Russia) Vartan Asatryan	Decision (Unanimous)	5	5:00	
Welterweight 77 kg	(Russia) Dmitry Bikrev	def.	(Russia) Maxim Butorin	Decision (Unanimous)	5	5:00	For the Fight Nights Welterweight Championship
Bantamweight 61 kg	(Russia) Nikita Mikhailov	def.	(Russia) Mukhamed Eminov	Decision (Majority)	3	5:00	
Lightweight 70 kg	(Russia) Maxim Schekin	def.	(Russia) Denis Dzhivovsky	Submission (Armbar)	1	0:46	
Welterweight 77 kg	(Russia) Makkasharip Zaynukov	def.	(Russia) Oleg Kosinov	Decision (Unanimous)	3	5:00	
Bantamweight 61 kg	(Russia) Vladimir Egoyan	def.	(Russia) Nikita Boltabaev	Decision (Unanimous)	3	5:00	
Bantamweight 61 kg	(Russia) Sharamazan Chupanov	def.	(Russia) Kamo Agavyan	Decision (Unanimous)	3	5:00	
Lightweight 70 kg	(Russia) Ali Abdulkhalikov	def.	(Russia) Ruslan Yamanbaev	Decision (Unanimous)	3	5:00	
Featherweight 66 kg	(Russia) Oleg Belozerov	def.	(Russia) Dmitriy Kuznetsov	Decision (Unanimous)	3	5:00	
Lightweight 70 kg	(Georgia (country)) Mikhail Gogitidze	def.	(Russia) Vladimir Kuzminykh	Decision (Majority)	3	5:00	
Light heavyweight 93 kg	(Afghanistan) Ajmal Atalwal	def.	(Ukraine) Dmitriy Navolokin	Submission (Rear-Naked Choke)	1	1:33	
Featherweight 66 kg	(Russia) Ali Yousefi	def.	(Russia) Magomed-Ali Bakhmudov	TKO (Punches)	1	4:28	
Lightweight 70 kg	(Russia) Radomir Filippov	def.	(Tajikistan) Emomali Kurbonov	Decision (Split)	3	5:00	
Welterweight 77 kg	(Russia) Samir Abdulaev	def.	(Kazakhstan) Aizhigit Shakirmamatov	Submission (Armbar)	1	2:45	
Welterweight 77 kg	(Russia) Kirill Kryukov	def.	(Tajikistan) Nurboki Kurbonbokizoda	Submission (Rear-Naked Choke)	1	1:57	
Middleweight 84 kg	(Russia) Karakhan Balakerimov	def.	(Ukraine) Dmitriy Perekupka	TKO (Punches)	1	0:40	

== Fight Nights Global 93: Mytyshchi Cup ==
Fight Nights Global 93: Mytyshchi Cup
- Promotion: Fight Nights Global
- Date: April 26, 2019
- Venue: Mytishchi Arena
- City: Mytishchi, Russia

'Fight Nights Global 93: Mytyshchi Cup' was a mixed martial arts event held by Fight Nights Global on April 26, 2019 at the Mytishchi Arena in Mytishchi, Russia.

=== Fight Card ===
Weight Class				Method	Round	Time	Notes
Heavyweight 120 kg	(Russia) Anatoly Malykhin	def.	(Belarus) Alexei Kudin	TKO (Punches)	2	3:32	
Lightweight 70 kg	(Azerbaijan) Nariman Abbasov	def.	(Kazakhstan) Kuat Khamitov	Decision (Unanimous)	5	5:00	For the Fight Nights Lightweight Championship
Light heavyweight 93 kg	(Russia) Artur Aliskerov	def.	(Russia) Dmitry Minakov	Decision (Split)	3	5:00	
Middleweight 84 kg	(Georgia (country)) Nodar Kudukhashvili	def.	(Russia) Ramazan Gamzatov	Decision (Majority)	3	5:00	
Light heavyweight 93 kg	(Russia) Sergey Ananyin	def.	(Russia) Asar Kulbatirov	Decision (Unanimous)	3	5:00	
Middleweight 84 kg	(Russia) Magomed Isaev	def.	(Armenia) Arman Karapetyan	Submission (Rear-Naked Choke)	1	4:44	
Welterweight 77 kg	(Russia) Shamil Ramazanov	def.	(Russia) Zaur Isaev	Decision (Unanimous)	3	5:00	
Light heavyweight 93 kg	(Russia) Farkhad Ibilkasumov	def.	(Kyrgyzstan) Almazbek Uulu Tynarbek	Submission (Rear-Naked Choke)	1	2:40	
Bantamweight 61 kg	(Russia) Magomedrasul Gadzhiev	def.	(Russia) Nikolay Shakhobov	TKO (Punches)	1	3:47	
Welterweight 77 kg	(Russia) Uzair Abdurakov	def.	(Russia) Maksim Panshin	Decision (Unanimous)	3	5:00	
Lightweight 70 kg	(Russia) Kamil Magomedov	def.	(Kyrgyzstan) Ayman Khadzhimanov	Submission (Rear-Naked Choke)	1	1:56	
Bantamweight 61 kg	(Russia) Oleg Korotkov	def.	(Russia) Rustam Islamov	Decision (Unanimous)	3	5:00	
Bantamweight 61 kg	(Russia) Nauruz Dzamikhov	def.	(Kyrgyzstan) Zaman Kamchybekov	TKO (Punches)	1	4:57	
Middleweight 84 kg	(Russia) Islam Tsechoev	def.	(Russia) Gagasha Imamaliev	TKO (Punches)	1	4:20	
Lightweight 70 kg	(Russia) Kamil Abdulazizov	def.	(Russia) Pavel Sundukov	Submission (Rear-Naked Choke)	1	1:25	
Middleweight 84 kg	(Russia) Magomedzagid Isalov	def.	(Russia) Gadzhimagomed Magomadov	Submission (Armbar)	1	1:33	
Welterweight 77 kg	(Russia) Murad Ramazanov	def.	(Russia) Ulugbek Oskanov	Submission (Rear-Naked Choke)	2	3:18	
Welterweight 77 kg	(Russia) Kamal Magomedov	def.	(Kyrgyzstan) Almanbet Zhanybekov	Submission (Rear-Naked Choke)	1	0:43	

== Fight Nights Global 94 ==
Fight Nights Global 94
- Promotion: Fight Nights Global
- Date: October 12, 2019
- City: Moscow, Russia

Fight Nights Global 94 was a mixed martial arts event held by Fight Nights Global on October 12, 2019 in Moscow, Russia.

=== Fight Card ===
Weight Class				Method	Round	Time	Notes
Bantamweight 61 kg	(Russia) Evgeniy Ignatiev	def.	(Russia) Nikita Boltabaev	TKO (Punches)	2	3:26	For the Fight Nights Bantamweight Championship
Heavyweight 120 kg	(Iran) Hasan Yousefi	def.	(Russia) Dmitry Smolyakov	Decision (Unanimous)	3	5:00	
Welterweight 77 kg	(Russia) Maxim Butorin	def.	(Russia) Magomed Isaev	Submission (Rear-Naked Choke)	2	3:20	
Bantamweight 61 kg	(Russia) Sharamazan Chupanov	def.	(Iran) Ali Yousefi	Decision (Unanimous)	3	5:00	
Lightweight 70 kg	(Russia) Nikita Basun	def.	(Russia) Oleg Kosinov	Submission (Guillotine Choke)	3	1:42	
Lightweight 70 kg	(Georgia (country)) Mikhail Gogitidze	def.	(Russia) Vladimir Kuzminykh	TKO	1	2:00	
Featherweight 66 kg	(Russia) Akhmed Balkizov	def.	(Russia) Magomed-Ali Bakhmudov	Decision (Split)	3	5:00	
Lightweight 70 kg	(Russia) Aleskandr Vasiliev	def.	(Russia) Vitaliy Nikitin	TKO (Punches)	1	1:30	
Light heavyweight 93 kg	(Tajikistan) Said Samadov	def.	(Russia) Anton Krasilnikov	Submission (Rear-Naked Choke)	1	0:54	
Bantamweight 61 kg	(Russia) Bair Asalkhanov	def.	(Kyrgyzstan) Nursultan Turduev	Decision (Split)	3	5:00	
Welterweight 77 kg	(Russia) Vitaliy Yakubenya	def.	(Russia) Ruslan Dzhafarov	KO (Punches)	1	4:30	
Lightweight 70 kg	(Iran) Mohammad Heybati	def.	(Russia) Filipp Kosyrev	Decision (Split)	3	5:00	
Heavyweight 120 kg	(Russia) Nikita Akhrarov	def.	(Russia) Rafael Aliev	TKO (Punches)	1	1:35	
Catchweight 90 kg	(Russia) Denis Dzhibraev	def.	(Russia) Abubakar Mamedov	TKO (Punches)	3	1:42	
Lightweight 70 kg	(Russia) Dzhabrail Tsechoev	def.	(Tajikistan) Shohjahon Boboev	Submission (Kimura)	2	0:00	

== Fight Nights Global 95 ==
Fight Nights Global 95
- Promotion: Fight Nights Global
- Date: October 19, 2019
- City: Sochi, Russia

Fight Nights Global 95 was a mixed martial arts event held by Fight Nights Global on October 19, 2019 in Sochi, Russia.

=== Fight Card ===
Weight Class				Method	Round	Time	Notes
Flyweight 57 kg	(Kazakhstan) Zhalgas Zhumagulov (c)	def.	(Russia) Ali Bagautinov	Decision (Split)	5	5:00	For the Fight Nights Flyweight Championship
Flyweight 57 kg	(Russia) Vartan Asatryan	def.	(Brazil) Raymison Bruno	Decision (Split)	3	5:00	
Heavyweight 120 kg	(Russia) Sultan Murtazaliev	def.	(Russia) Anton Vinnikov	Decision (Unanimous)	3	5:00	
Middleweight 84 kg	(Russia) David Barkhudaryan	def.	(Kazakhstan) Erkinbek Inzhel	TKO (Doctor Stoppage)	3	0:51	
Light heavyweight 93 kg	(Russia) Artur Aliskerov	def.	(Ukraine) Aleksandr Lugaylo	TKO (Punches)	1	0:00	
Catchweight 73 kg	(Russia) Shamil Amirov	def.	(Russia) Arsen Batyrov	TKO	2	0:00	
Featherweight 66 kg	(Russia) Sergey Klyuev	def.	(Russia) Pavel Klimov	Submission	1	1:10	
Lightweight 70 kg	(Kazakhstan) Nurbek Kabdrakhmanov	def.	(Kazakhstan) Fedor Babich	Submission	2	0:00	
Flyweight 57 kg	(Russia) Aren Akopyan	def.	(Russia) Magomed Kamalov	Decision (Unanimous)	3	5:00	
Welterweight 77 kg	(Russia) Islam Kartlygov	def.	(Georgia (country)) Enrik Agrba	TKO (Punches)	2	4:42	

== Fight Nights Global 96 ==
Fight Nights Global 96
- Promotion: Fight Nights Global
- Date: December 28, 2019
- Venue: Adrenaline Stadium
- City: Moscow, Russia

'Fight Nights Global 96' was a mixed martial arts event held by Fight Nights Global on December 28, 2019 at the Adrenaline Stadium in Moscow, Russia.

=== Fight Card ===
Weight Class				Method	Round	Time	Notes
Welterweight 77 kg	(Russia) Dmitry Bikrev	def.	(Serbia) Aleksandar Janković	TKO (Punches)	2	2:36	
Lightweight 70 kg	(Russia) Alexey Makhno	def.	(Russia) Vladimir Kuzminykh	TKO (Punches)	2	4:37	
Lightweight 70 kg	(Russia) Igor Egorov	def.	(Russia) Vyacheslav Danilov	TKO (Punches)	1	2:22	
Lightweight 70 kg	(Russia) David Samuel	def.	(Russia) Ilya Kovalev	Decision (Unanimous)	3	2:00	For Amateur Tournament Championship (3x2min)
Featherweight 66 kg	(Afghanistan) Hussain Bakhsh Safari	def.	(Russia) Petr Berg	Decision (Unanimous)	3	5:00	
Heavyweight 120 kg	(Russia) Yusup Shuaev	def.	(Russia) Vyacheslav Skotnikov	TKO (Punches)	1	4:08	
Featherweight 66 kg	(Russia) Dmitriy Kuznetsov	def.	(Kyrgyzstan) Shamyrbek Mukhambet Uulu	TKO (Punches)	1	0:49	
Middleweight 84 kg	(Russia) Roman Gnezdilov	def.	(Kyrgyzstan) Almanbet Zhanybekov	Decision (Unanimous)	3	5:00	

== See also ==
- 2019 in UFC
- 2019 in ONE Championship
- 2019 in Rizin Fighting Federation
- 2019 in Konfrontacja Sztuk Walki
- 2019 in Absolute Championship Akhmat
- 2019 in Legacy Fighting Alliance
