= Mir (theatre) =

Coordinates: 55°46′14″N 37°37′18″E

Mir (Russian: Концертный зал «Мир») is a theatre and concert hall in the center of Moscow (Tsvetnoy Boulevard, House 11). It is located in a building built in 1881.

== History ==
An eight-stone building was built on Tsvetnoy Boulevard in 1881, designed to show the panorama of "Plevna". In 1886 the building was bought by the brothers Nikitin and they opened a circus there. Later, a horse riding arena was established in the building. During the Russian Civil War, the arena burned down, and since then the building was empty.

In 1957, the reconstruction of the building for a cinema was started by architects V. A. Butuzov, N. S. Strigalova, M. I. Bogdanov, and engineers L. Bogatkin, V. Kotov, and A. Levenshtein. During the reconstruction only the original brick walls were preserved. The new cinema "Mir" (translating as "world") was opened on February 28, 1958 as a Kinopanorama cinema. In 1960, it was converted into a larger widescreen cinema with 1,220 seats.

In 2006 the cinema was again reconstructed, after which it opened as a concert hall for 923 spectators. The last reconstruction was carried out in 2017, after which Mir became a concert and entertainment venue.

== Architecture ==
The building is brick, octagonal in plan. The diameter of the cylindrical auditorium is about 40 m. Its walls were lined with vertical wooden slats in order to improve the building's acoustics. The hall is covered with a conical dome from metal trusses. Outside, the walls are faced with gray ceramic tiles. The octagon of the main volume rises above the glazed rectangular volume, where the lobby of the cinema is located. The combination of glass and the matte surfaces of the walls is characteristic of Soviet architecture of the second half of the 1950s.
