= Irina Viner-Usmanova Gymnastics Palace =

Stadium in Moscow, Russia

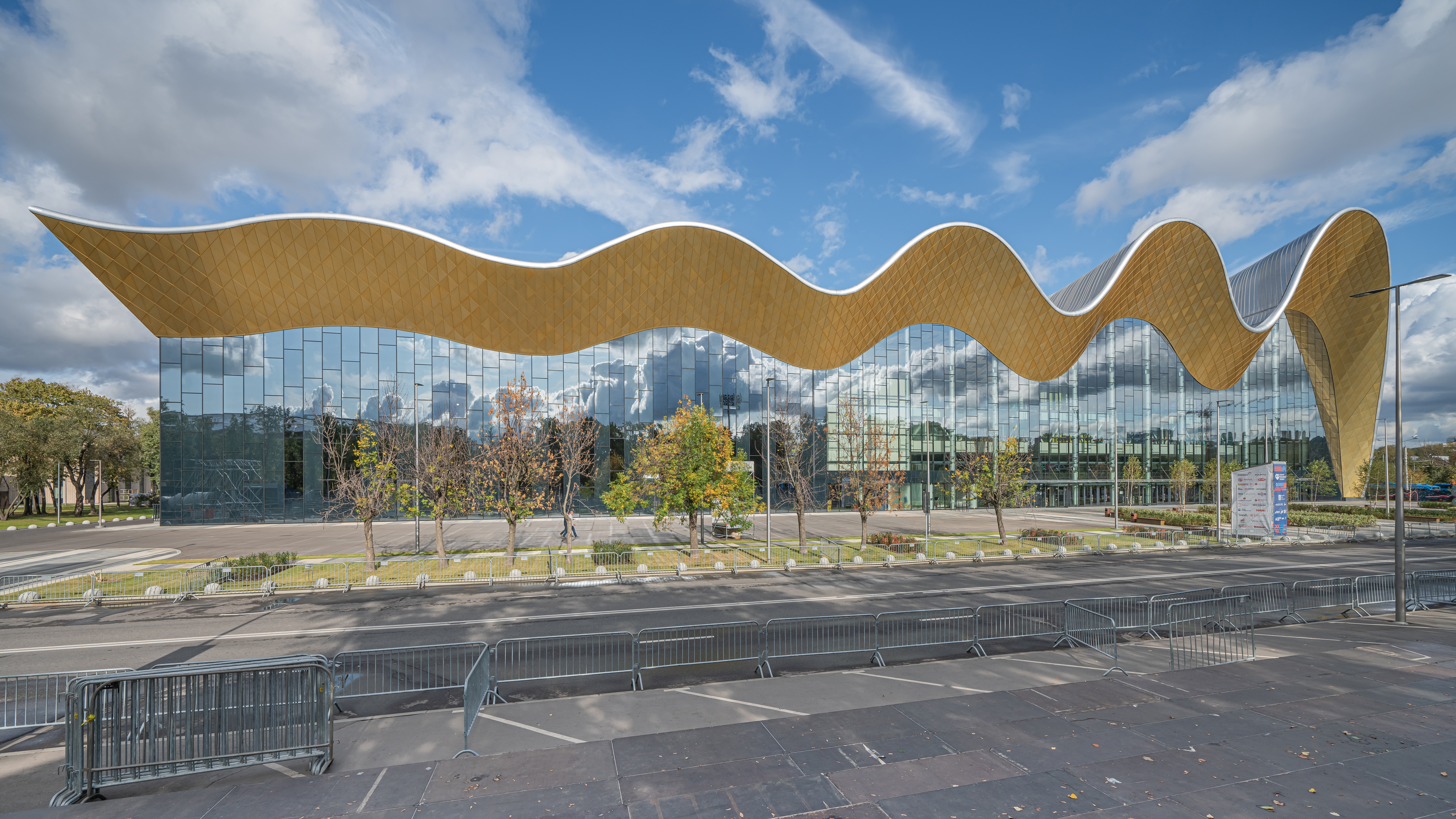
- Interactive map of Irina Viner-Usmanova Gymnastics Palace
- Location: Luzhniki Olympic Complex, Moscow, Russia
- Coordinates: 55°43′03″N 37°33′45″E
- Operator: Elena Smirnova
- Capacity: 4,000
- Field size: 130 by 80 metres (142.2 yd × 87.5 yd)
- Public transit: Moscow Central Circle

Construction
- Built: 2017–2019
- Opened: 18 June 2019
- Architect: Pride ООО
- Structural engineer: Sergey Kuznetsov

The Irina Viner-Usmanova Gymnastics Palace is a stadium located in the Luzhniki Olympic Complex in Moscow, Russia. Projected by Moscow's head architect Sergey Kuznetsov and financed by billionaire Alisher Usmanov and named after his wife and head gymnastics coach Irina Viner-Usmanova, it was constructed from 2017 to 2019 and was officially opened on 18 June 2019. Despite its name, the venue has been used not only for rhythmic gymnastics events, but also for musical concerts and festivals. Other sports events, including dancesport and sport climbing, took also place in the Gymnastics Palace.

== Construction ==
The main designer of the stadium is Moscow's head architect Sergey Kuznetsov, and the construction was fulfilled by the commercial and industrial company Pride ООО. The overall size of the building accounts for 23,500 m^{2}. With a height of 25–26 m, the building includes 5 basements, and upstairs. The object, including its facade, is almost fully enveloped with glass. Its roof has a difficult, ribbon-like structure, with an installed water disposal system and a lightning discharger. The building's main part is a 54×36 m large arena, which is surrounded by transformable stands for 958 spectators and fixed stands which can hold up to 2954 visitors. Depending on the event type, the arena may hold from 150 people during practice up to 250 athletes and almost 4000 spectators during main events.

On the first basement, there are three practicing rooms, dressing rooms, coach and judge rooms, saunas and canteens. The second basement contains spectator zones with a bar, two choreographic halls, a gym and a health center. A press center hall with a capacity of 150 people, as well as commentary rooms and rooms for various activities, such as masteries, lie on the third floor. The 4th floor includes seats stipulated for up to 80 VIPs. The fifth and last basement provides a small hotel for athletes, which can accommodate not more than 113 people in 39 rooms.

== Opening ==
The Palace was opened on 18 June 2019 by the Mayor of Moscow, Sergey Sobyanin.

== Awards ==
- "2016 BIM Technology", in the nomination "Best BIM Project. Sports Objects"
- Winner of the Moscow Architecture Award by the Board of Architects (2017–2018) and winner in the nomination "Best Architectural and Town-Planning Solution for a Sports Object" (2020)
- "AlumForum" Grand-Prix for the best aluminium projected building
- Winner of the National Sport Award of the Ministry of Sports of Russia, in the nomination "Russian Sports Objects" (2019).
- Laureate of the BISPO AWARDS, a national independent award in the field of sport business and effective management of sport objects, in the nomination "Best Building and Reconstruction Project of Sports Objects" (2019).
- Award of the MIPIM Awards in the nomination "Best Sports and Cultural Object" (2020).
