= Fetisov Arena =

Indoor arena in Vladivostok, Russia

Coordinates: 43°14′13″N 132°02′28″E

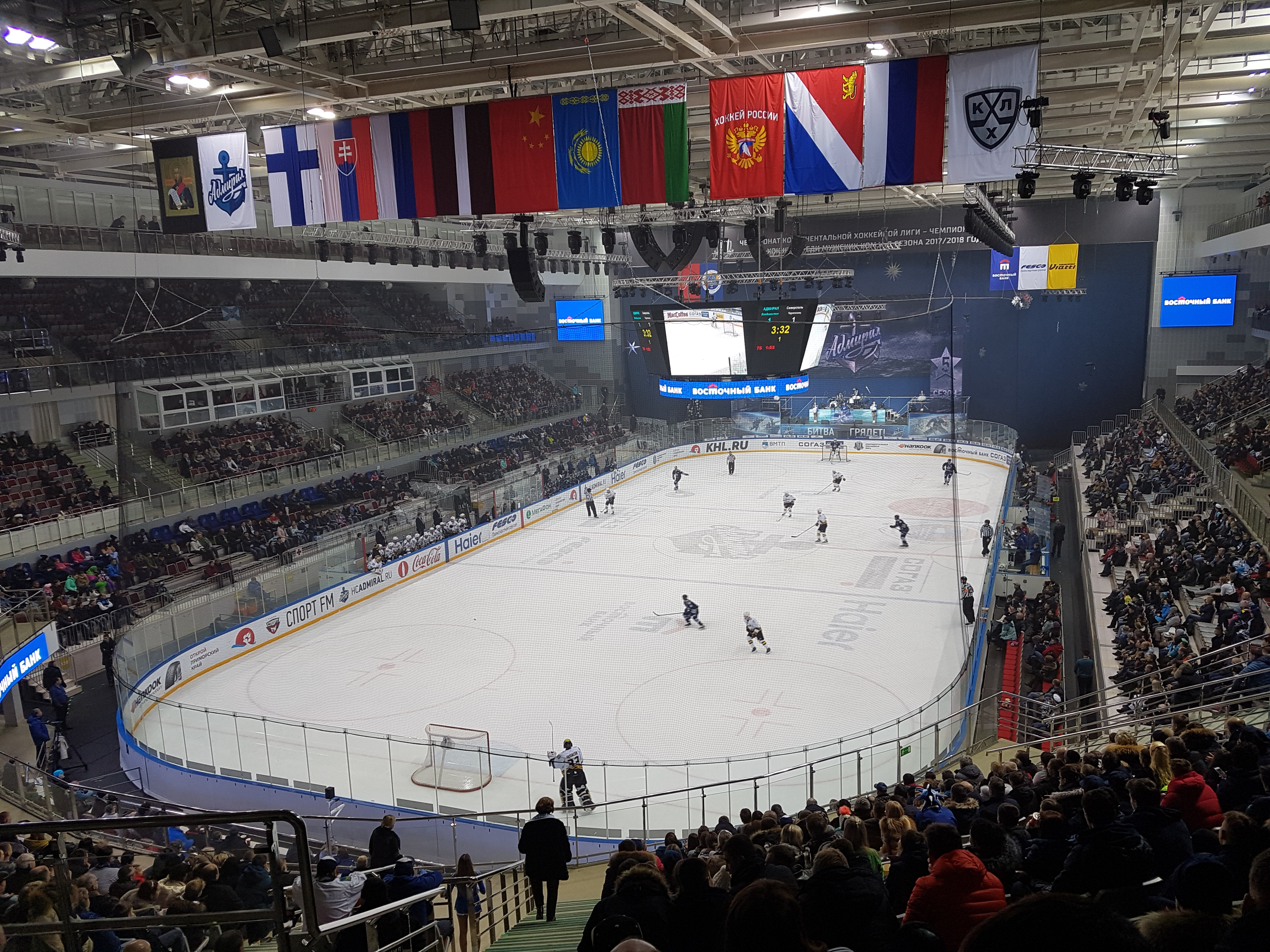
- Interior of Fetisov Arena in 2017
- Interactive map of Fetisov Arena
- Location: Vladivostok, Russia
- Capacity: Hockey: 5,915; Concerts: 8,000

Construction
- Groundbreaking: 2010
- Opened: 2013

Tenant
- Admiral Vladivostok (2013-present)

Fetisov Arena (Russian: Фетисов-Арена) is an indoor arena located in Vladivostok, Russia. Completed in 2013, it has a seating capacity of 6,000 spectators for hockey matches and up to 8,000 for concerts. The venue is home of Admiral Vladivostok of the Kontinental Hockey League.

The arena is named in honor of Viacheslav Fetisov.

== See also ==
- List of indoor arenas in Russia
- List of Kontinental Hockey League arenas
