= 2017 in Fight Nights Global =

Information
- First date: January 28

Events

Fights

Chronology
2016 in Fight Nights Global	2017 in Fight Nights Global	2018 in Fight Nights Global

The year 2017 was the 7th year in the history of the Fight Nights Global, a mixed martial arts promotion based in Russia. It started broadcasting through a television agreement with Match TV.

== List of events ==
#	Event Title	Date	Arena	Location
1	Fight Nights Global 58: Brandão vs. Machaev	January 28, 2017	Ali Aliyev Sports Palace	Kaspiysk, Russia
2	Fight Nights Global 59: Minakov vs. Linderman	February 23, 2017	Ali Aliyev Sports Palace	Kaspiysk, Russia
3	Fight Nights Global 60: Aryshev vs. Khasanov	March 4, 2017	Tax Committee Sports Center	Dushanbe, Tajikistan
4	Fight Nights Global 61: Aleksakhin vs. Enomoto	March 11, 2017	Bryansk Ice Palace	Bryansk, Russia
5	Fight Nights Global 62: Matmuratov vs. Kurzanov	March 31, 2017	Krylatskoye Sports Palace	Moscow, Russia
6	Fight Nights Global 63: Alibekov vs. Khamitov	April 21, 2017	Fetisov Arena	Vladivostok, Russia
7	Fight Nights Global 64: Nam vs. Bagautinov	April 27, 2017	VTB Arena	Moscow, Russia
8	Fight Nights Global 65: Asatryan vs. Zhumagulov	May 19, 2017	Barys Arena	Astana, Kazakhstan
9	Fight Nights Global 66: Alikhanov vs. Murtazaliev	May 21, 2017	Ali Aliyev Sports Palace	Kaspiysk, Russia
10	Fight Nights Global 67: Brandão vs. Galiev	May 25, 2017	DIVS Arena	Ekaterinburg, Russia
11	Fight Nights Global 68: Pavlovich vs. Mokhnatkin	June 2, 2017	Yubileyny Sports Palace	Saint Petersburg, Russia
12	Fight Nights Global 69: Bagautinov vs. Nobre	June 30, 2017	Ice Sports Palace Sibir	Novosibirsk, Russia
13	Fight Nights Global 70: Palhares vs. Ivanov	July 7, 2017	FSK Sports Complex	Ulan-Ude, Russia
14	Fight Nights Global 71: Mineev vs. Michailidis	July 29, 2017	Luzhniki Palace of Sports	Moscow, Russia
15	Fight Nights Global 72: Hill vs. Engibaryan	August 24, 2017	Ice Cube	Sochi, Russia
16	Fight Nights Global 73: Aliev vs. Brandão	September 4, 2017	Ali Aliyev Sports Palace	Kaspiysk, Russia
17	Fight Nights Global 74: Aleksakhin vs. Graves	September 29, 2017	Luzhniki Palace of Sports	Moscow, Russia
18	Fight Nights Global 75: Deák vs. Chistyakov	October 6, 2017	Yubileyny Sports Palace	Saint Petersburg, Russia
19	Fight Nights Global 76: Bagautinov vs. Martinez	October 8, 2017	Olympus Arena	Krasnodar, Russia
20	Fight Nights Global 77: Krylov vs. Newton	October 13, 2017	SOK Energetik	Surgut, Russia
21	Fight Nights Global 78: Tsarev vs. Guseinov	November 4, 2017	Lada Arena	Tolyatti, Russia
22	Fight Nights Global 79: Pavlovich vs. Sidelnikov	November 19, 2017	Diesel Arena	Penza, Russia
23	Fight Nights Global 80: Khamitov vs. Queally	November 26, 2017	Almaty Arena	Almaty, Kazakhstan
24	Fight Nights Global 81: Matmuratov vs. Ignatiev	December 15, 2017	Arena Omsk	Omsk, Russia
25	Fight Nights Global 82: Minakov vs. Johnson	December 16, 2017	Luzhniki Palace of Sports	Moscow, Russia

== Fight Nights Global 58: Brandão vs. Machaev ==
FNG 58: Brandão vs. Machaev
- Promotion: Fight Nights Global
- Date: January 28, 2017
- Venue: Ali Aliyev Sports Palace
- City: Kaspiysk, Russia

Event chronology
Fight Nights Global 57	FNG 58: Brandão vs. Machaev	Fight Nights Global 59

Fight Nights Global 58: Brandão vs. Machaev was a mixed martial arts event held by Fight Nights Global on January 28, 2017, at the Ali Aliyev Sports Palace in Kaspiysk, Russia.

=== Background ===
This event featured a lightweight superfight between one of the most dominant lightweight in Europe, former Bellator heavyweight champion Murad Machaev and UFC veteran the Brazilian Diego Brandão as headliner.

For undisclosed reason Stanislav Molodtsov was forced to withdraw from his Grand-Prix match against Abusupyan Alikhanov, he was subsequently replaced by Pavel Doroftei.

=== Results ===
Fight Card
Weight Class				Method	Round	Time	Notes
Lightweight 70 kg	(Brazil) Diego Brandão	def.	(Russia) Murad Machaev	Submission (Armbar)	2	0:58	
Middleweight 84 kg	(Russia) Abusupyan Alikhanov	def.	(Moldova) Pavel Doroftei	TKO (Corner Stoppage)	2	5:00	Middleweight Grand Prix Semi-Finals
Bantamweight 61 kg	(Russia) Shamil Magomedov	def.	(Russia) Bakhachali Bakhachaliev	Draw (Majority)	3	5:00	
Catchweight 68 kg	(Russia) Marat Magomedov	def.	(Ukraine) Maksim Maryanchuk	TKO (Punches)	1	4:14	
Welterweight 77 kg	(Russia) Kamal Magomedov	def.	(Russia) Rasul Abdulaev	TKO (Punches)	1	4:23	
Lightweight 70 kg	(Russia) Gusen Gadzhiev	def.	(Russia) Denis Izmodenov	Submission (Rear Naked Choke)	2	3:52	
Flyweight 57 kg	(Russia) Tagir Ulanbekov	def.	(Kazakhstan) Asu Almabayev	TKO (Submission to punches)	3	4:51	
Flyweight 57 kg	(Russia) Artur Bagautinov	def.	(Russia) Ilya Kosnyrev	TKO (Doctor Stoppage)	2	1:48	
Welterweight 70 kg	(Russia) Shamil Amirov	def.	(Russia) Vladimir Palchenkov	Decision (Unanimous)	3	5:00	
Light Heavyweight 93 kg	(Tajikistan) Soleh Khasanov	def.	(Russia) Arnold Balkitskiy	TKO (Punches)	3	1:13	
Middleweight 84 kg	(Russia) Magomed Isaev	def.	(Russia) Cory Alexander	Decision (Majority)	3	5:00	

== Fight Nights Global 59: Minakov vs. Linderman ==
FNG 59: Minakov vs. Linderman
- Promotion: Fight Nights Global
- Date: February 23, 2017
- Venue: Ali Aliyev Sports Palace
- City: Kaspiysk, Russia

Event chronology
Fight Nights Global 58	FNG 59: Minakov vs. Linderman	Fight Nights Global 60

Fight Nights Global 59: Minakov vs. Linderman was a mixed martial arts event held by Fight Nights Global on February 23, 2017, at the Ali Aliyev Sports Palace in Kaspiysk, Russia.

=== Background ===
This event featured a heavyweight superfight between one of the most dominant heavyweights in the game, unbeaten former Bellator heavyweight champion Vitaly Minakov and the American DJ Linderman as headliner.

Also featured on the card, was a number one contender fight for the Fight Nights Lightweight Championship between Akhmet Aliev and Efrain Escudero.

=== Results ===
Fight Card
Weight Class				Method	Round	Time	Notes
Heavyweight 120 kg	(Russia) Vitaly Minakov	def.	(United States) D.J Linderman	KO (Punch)	3	3:10	
Lightweight 70 kg	(Russia) Akhmet Aliev	def.	(Mexico) Efraín Escudero	Decision (Split)	3	5:00	
Bantamweight 61 kg	(Slovakia) Tomáš Deák	def.	(Russia) Aleksandr Yanyshev	Submission (Rear-Naked Choke)	2	1:24	Bantamweight Grand Prix Semi-Finals
Middleweight 84 kg	(Russia) Roman Kopylov	def.	(Ukraine) Artem Shokalo	TKO (Punches)	3	4:11	
Featherweight 66 kg	(Russia) Alexander Matmuratov	def.	(Bosnia and Herzegovina) Adi Alic	Decision (Majority)	3	5:00	
Light Heavyweight 93 kg	(Russia) Aleksey Sidorenko	def.	(Russia) Yusup Suleymanov	Decision (Majority)	3	5:00	
Flyweight 57 kg	(Russia) Vartan Asatryan	def.	(Azerbaijan) Elnar Ibragimov	TKO (Elbows and Punches)	1	4:07	Flyweight Grand Prix Semi-Finals
Light Heavyweight 93 kg	(Russia) Kurban Omarov	def.	(Brazil) Joaquim Ferreira	TKO (Retirement)	2	1:36	Light Heavyweight Grand Prix Quarter-Finals
Lightweight 70 kg	(Azerbaijan) Nariman Abbasov	def.	(Russia) Artur Zaynullin	Decision (Unanimous)	3	5:00	
Flyweight 57 kg	(Russia) Rizvan Abuev	def.	(Kyrgyzstan) Kanybek Beysheev	TKO (Punches)	1	3:40	

== Fight Nights Global 60: Aryshev vs. Khasanov ==
FNG 60: Aryshev vs. Khasanov
- Promotion: Fight Nights Global
- Date: March 4, 2017
- Venue: Tax Committee Sports Center
- City: Dushanbe, Tajikistan

Event chronology
Fight Nights Global 59	FNG 60: Aryshev vs. Khasanov	Fight Nights Global 61

Fight Nights Global 60: Aryshev vs. Khasanov was a mixed martial arts event held by Fight Nights Global on March 4, 2017, at the Tax Committee Sports Center in Dushanbe, Tajikistan.

=== Results ===
Fight Card
Weight Class				Method	Round	Time	Notes
Middleweight 84 kg	(Russia) Dmitry Aryshev	def.	(Tajikistan) Soleh Khasanov	TKO (Punches)	3	1:52	
Heavyweight 120 kg	(Brazil) Fábio Maldonado	def.	(Tajikistan) Abdul-Khamid Davlyatov	TKO (punches)	1	4:20	
Flyweight 57 kg	(Russia) Oskar Dolchin	def.	(Tajikistan) Shuhrat Khakimov	Decision (Unanimous)	3	5:00	
Lightweight 70 kg	(Kazakhstan) Asif Tagiev	def.	(Brazil) David Clay	Decision (Unanimous)	3	5:00	
Light Heavyweight 93 kg	(Russia) Abulmuslim Magomedov	def.	(Kyrgyzstan) Sadyrbek uulu Uzak	TKO (Punches)	2	1:39	
Featherweight 66 kg	(Tajikistan) Bekhruz Zukhurov	def.	(Iran) Ali Yousefi	KO (Punch)	1	2:48	
Lightweight 70 kg	(Russia) Georgiy Kichigin	def.	(Ukraine) Anatoly Safronov	Submission (Armbar)	1	2:07	
Lightweight 70 kg	(Russia) Stanislav Iluschenkov	def.	(Tajikistan) Emomali Kurbanov	TKO (Retirement)	1	1:15	
Lightweight 70 kg	(Tajikistan) Bakhtier Ibragimov	def.	(Tajikistan) Farid Lutfulloev	Submission (Rear-Naked Choke)	1		
Featherweight 66 kg	(Tajikistan) Akmaldzhon Mamurov	def.	(Tajikistan) Amretdin Emomerbekov	Submission (Rear-Naked Choke)	1		

== Fight Nights Global 61: Aleksakhin vs. Enomoto ==
FNG 61: Aleksakhin vs. Enomoto
- Promotion: Fight Nights Global
- Date: March 11, 2017
- Venue: Bryansk Ice Palace
- City: Bryansk, Russia

Event chronology
Fight Nights Global 60	FNG 61: Aleksakhin vs. Enomoto	Fight Nights Global 62

Fight Nights Global 61: Aleksakhin vs. Enomoto was a mixed martial arts event held by Fight Nights Global on March 11, 2017, at the Bryansk Ice Palace in Bryansk, Russia.

=== Background ===
This event featured a middleweight superfight between Nikolay Aleksakhin and Yasubey Enomoto as headliner.

Ayub Gimbatov was injured during the preparation for his fight and was forced to withdraw from his match against Giorgi Lobzhanidze. Instead Lobzhanidze has fight with the double world champion and European MMA champion Gadzhimurad Khiramagomedov.

=== Results ===
Fight Card
Weight Class				Method	Round	Time	Notes
Middleweight 84 kg	(Russia) Nikolay Aleksakhin	def.	(Switzerland) Yasubey Enomoto	TKO (Injury)	2	1:10	
Light Heavyweight 93 kg	(Russia) Artur Astakhov	def.	(United States) Emanuel Newton	Decision (Unanimous)	3	5:00	Light Heavyweight Grand Prix Quarter-Finals
Middleweight 84 kg	(Russia) Gadzhimurad Khiramagomedov	def.	(Georgia (country)) Georgi Lobjanidze	Decision (Unanimous)	3	5:00	
Welterweight 77 kg	(Russia) David Gladun	def.	(Russia) Yuri Izotov	Decision (Unanimous)	3	5:00	
Lightweight 70 kg	(Russia) Evgeniy Ignatiev	def.	(Russia) Gadzhi Rabadanov	Decision (Majority)	3	5:00	
Featherweight 66 kg	(Russia) Nikita Mikhailov	def.	(Russia) Ignatiy Androsov	Decision (Unanimous)	3	5:00	
Lightweight 70 kg	(Russia) Maxim Panshin	def.	(Russia) Andrey Zheltov	Decision (Unanimous)	3	5:00	
Welterweight 77 kg	(Russia) Ishaq Aliyev	def.	(Russia) Roman Tkachenko	Decision (Unanimous)	3	5:00	

== Fight Nights Global 62: Matmuratov vs. Kurzanov ==
FNG 62: Matmuratov vs. Kurzanov
- Promotion: Fight Nights Global
- Date: March 31, 2017
- Venue: Krylatskoye Sports Palace
- City: Moscow, Russia

Event chronology
Fight Nights Global 61	FNG 62: Matmuratov vs. Kurzanov

Fight Nights Global 62: Matmuratov vs. Kurzanov was a mixed martial arts event held by Fight Nights Global on March 31, 2017, at the Krylatskoye Sports Palace in Moscow, Russia.

=== Background ===
This event will feature two Grand-Prix final, first for the inaugural Fight Nights Global Heavyweight Championship between Sergey Pavlovich and Mikhail Mokhnatkin as headliner, second For the inaugural Fight Nights Global Featherweight Championship between Ilya Kurzanov and Movlid Khaibulaev as co-headliner.

Kirill Sidelnikov was injured and couldn't participate in the Final of the Grand Prix, and was subsequently replaced by Mikhail Mokhnatkin.

=== Results ===
Fight Card
Weight Class				Method	Round	Time	Notes
Featherweight 66 kg	(Russia) Alexander Matmuratov	def.	(Russia) Ilya Kurzanov	KO (Punches)	2	0:49	GP Final For the inaugural FNG Featherweight Championship
Lightweight 70 kg	(Georgia (country)) Levan Makashvili	def.	(England) Jack McGann	Decision (Unanimous)	3	5:00	
Flyweight 57 kg	(Kazakhstan) Zhalgas Zhumagulov	def.	(Russia) Artur Bagautinov	KO (Punch)	2	2:51	Flyweight Grand Prix Semi-Finals
Welterweight 77 kg	(Russia) Aliaskhab Khizriev	def.	(Croatia) Matej Truhan	KO (Punch to the Body)	1	0:37	
Featherweight 66 kg	(Russia) Magomed Yunisulau	def.	(Brazil) Allan Popeye	Submission (Arm-Triangle Choke)	1	2:06	
Bantamweight 61 kg	(Russia) Umar Nurmagomedov	def.	(Kyrgyzstan) Alym Isabaev	TKO (Punches)	2	3:32	
Bantamweight 61 kg	(Russia) Grachik Engibaryan	def.	(Romania) Paul Marin	KO (Punches)	2	0:13	
Lightweight 70 kg	(Russia) Ramil Mustapayev	def.	(Belarus) Sergey Faley	KO (Punch)	3	3:39	
Bantamweight 61 kg	(Russia) Nauruz Dzamikhov	vs.	(Russia) Magomed Al-Abdullah	DRAW	3	5:00	
Flyweight 57 kg	(Russia) Nikita Burchak	def.	(Russia) Alexey Safonov	KO (Punch)	2	0:10	
Featherweight 66 kg	(Russia) Kamil Abdulazizov	def.	(Russia) Vadim Panevin	Submission (Kimura)	2	3:12	

=== Fight Nights Global Featherweight Grand-Prix bracket ===
Quarter-Finals
(Russia) Roman Silagadze	TKO
(Spain) Alfonso Perez	1r.
(Russia) Movlid Khaibulaev	TKO
(Azerbaijan) Vugar Bahshiev	3r.
(Russia) Akhmed Balkizov	SUB
(Russia) Ruslan Yamanbaev	1r.
(Russia) Ilya Kurzanov	DEC
(Russia) Alexander Matmuratov	3r.

Semi-Finals
(Georgia (country)) Paata Robakidze	1r.
(Russia) Movlid Khaibulaev	SUB
(Russia) Akhmed Balkizov	2r.
(Russia) Ilya Kurzanov	SUB

Final
(Russia) Movlid Khaibulaev	2r.
(Russia) Ilya Kurzanov	KO

^{1}Roman Silagadze was injured and couldn't participate in the Semi-Finals of the Grand Prix, and was subsequently replaced by Paata Robakidze.

== Fight Nights Global 63: Alibekov vs. Khamitov ==
FNG 63: Alibekov vs. Khamitov
- Promotion: Fight Nights Global
- Date: April 21, 2017
- Venue: Fetisov Arena
- City: Vladivostok, Russia

Fight Nights Global 63: Alibekov vs. Khamitov was a mixed martial arts event held by Fight Nights Global on April 21, 2017, at the Fetisov Arena in Vladivostok, Russia.

=== Results ===
Fight Card
Weight Class				Method	Round	Time	Notes
Lightweight 70 kg	(Russia) Magomedsaygid Alibekov	def.	(Kazakhstan) Kuat Khamitov	Decision (Unanimous)	5	5:00	For the FNG Lightweight Championship
Middleweight 84 kg	(Russia) Vladimir Mineev	def.	(Brazil) Maiquel Falcão	TKO (Punches)	1	3:36	
Welterweight 77 kg	(Brazil) Jorge de Oliveira	def.	(Russia) Gennadiy Kovalev	Submission (Anaconda Choke)	3	2:51	
Middleweight 84 kg	(Russia) Mikhail Kabargin	def.	(Russia) Sergey Kalinin	TKO (Punches)	2	4:20	
Middleweight 84 kg	(Greece) Andreas Michailidis	def.	(Russia) Evgeny Shalomaev	TKO (Punches)	1	2:56	
Lightweight 70 kg	(Russia) Konstantin Karaulnyj	def.	(Russia) Konstantin Yurchenko	KO (Kick to the Body)	2	1:24	
Lightweight 70 kg	(Russia) Dmitriy Gorobets	def.	(Russia) Hushkadam Zavurbekov	Submission (Triangle Choke)	1	4:11	
Lightweight 70 kg	(Russia) Kamo Agavyan	def.	(Russia) Roman Turkana-Surinovich	Submission (Armbar)	2	3:05	
Flyweight 57 kg	(Russia) Sergey Lesnikov	def.	(Russia) Magomedrasul Sheikhmagomedov	Submission (Triangle Choke)	1	1:41	

== Fight Nights Global 64: Nam vs. Bagautinov ==
FNG 64: Nam vs. Bagautinov
- Promotion: Fight Nights Global
- Date: April 27, 2017
- Venue: VTB Arena
- City: Moscow, Russia

Fight Nights Global 64: Nam vs. Bagautinov was a mixed martial arts event held by Fight Nights Global on April 27, 2017, at the VTB Arena in Moscow, Russia.

=== Results ===
Fight Card
Weight Class				Method	Round	Time	Notes
Flyweight 57 kg	(United States) Tyson Nam	def.	(Russia) Ali Bagautinov	KO (Head Kick)	3	4:59	
Heavyweight 120 kg	(Belarus) Alexei Kudin	def.	(United States) Derrick Mehmen	Decision (Split)	3	5:00	
Lightweight 70 kg	(Republic of Ireland) Peter Queally	def.	(Russia) Igor Egorov	Decision (Unanimous)	3	5:00	
Middleweight 84 kg	(Russia) Ayub Gimbatov	def.	(Kazakhstan) Dauren Ermekov	TKO (Punches)	1	3:10	
Bantamweight 61 kg	(Russia) Artur Magomedov	def.	(Russia) Evgeniy Bondarev	Submission (Rear Naked Choke)	2	3:49	
Flyweight 57 kg	(Tajikistan) Shuhrat Khakimov	def.	(Russia) Dmitriy Kuznetsov	Decision (Unanimous)	3	5:00	
Women Welterweight 77 kg	(Russia) Svetlana Khautova	def.	(Kazakhstan) Zamzagul Fayzallanova	Decision (Unanimous)	3	5:00	
Lightweight 70 kg	(Russia) Sultan Abdurazakov	def.	(Belarus) Eduard Muravitskiy	Decision (Unanimous)	3	5:00	
Flweight 57 kg	(Russia) Ilya Kosnyrev	vs.	(Belarus) Suren Osipov	Draw	3	5:00	

== Fight Nights Global 65: Asatryan vs. Zhumagulov ==
FNG 65: Asatryan vs. Zhumagulov
- Promotion: Fight Nights Global
- Date: May 19, 2017
- Venue: Barys Arena
- City: Astana, Kazakhstan

Fight Nights Global 65: Asatryan vs. Zhumagulov was a mixed martial arts event held by Fight Nights Global on May 19, 2017, at the Barys Arena in Astana, Kazakhstan.

=== Results ===
Fight Card
Weight Class				Method	Round	Time	Notes
Flyweight 57 kg	(Russia) Vartan Asatryan	def.	(Kazakhstan) Zhalgas Zhumagulov	Decision (Unanimous)	5	5:00	GP Final For the inaugural FNG Flyweight Championship
Welterweight 77 kg	(Kazakhstan) Georgiy Kichigin	def.	(Russia) Gadzhimurad Khiramagomedov	Decision (Split)	5	5:00	GP Final For the inaugural FNG Welterweight Championship
Bantamweight 61 kg	(Kazakhstan) Erzhan Estanov	def.	(Russia) Sergey Razin	Submission (Armbar)	1	3:45	
Welterweight 77 kg	(Kazakhstan) Sultan Kiyalov	def.	(France) Michael Dubois	TKO (Punches)	2	3:36	
Flyweight 57 kg	(Russia) Tagir Ulanbekov	def.	(Bangladesh) Shajidul Haque	Decision (Unanimous)	3	5:00	
Bantamweight 61 kg	(Russia) Akhmed Musakaev	def.	(Kazakhstan) Ruslan Serikpulov	Decision (Unanimous)	3	5:00	
Featherweight 66 kg	(Kazakhstan) Zhasulan Akhimzanov	def.	(Tajikistan) Ardarsher Murodaliev	Submission (Triangle Choke)	1	3:58	
Welterweight 77 kg	(Kazakhstan) Adil Boranbayev	def.	(Russia) Vladislav Shabalin	TKO (Corner Stoppage)	3	4:28	
Featherweight 66 kg	(Kazakhstan) Sabit Zhusupov	def.	(Argentina) Martin Gil	Submission (Rear Naked Choke)	2	2:58	
Featherweight 66 kg	(Kazakhstan) Ermek Tlauov	def.	(Russia) Sergey Malykov	Submission (Guillotine choke)	1	1:32	
Lightweight 70 kg	(Armenia) Aik Virabyan	def.	(Russia) Mikhail Sarbashev	TKO (Punches)	1	1:59	
Featherweight 66 kg	(Kazakhstan) Nurbek Kabdrakhmanov	def.	(Kazakhstan) Kanat Kulmagambetov	Submission (Rear Naked Choke)	2	3:56	

== Fight Nights Global 66: Alikhanov vs. Murtazaliev ==
FNG 66: Alikhanov vs. Murtazaliev
- Promotion: Fight Nights Global
- Date: May 21, 2017
- Venue: Ali Aliyev Sports Palace
- City: Kaspiysk, Russia

Fight Nights Global 66: Alikhanov vs. Murtazaliev was a mixed martial arts event held by Fight Nights Global on May 21, 2017, at the Ali Aliyev Sports Palace in Kaspiysk, Russia.

=== Results ===
Fight Card
Weight Class				Method	Round	Time	Notes
Middleweight 84 kg	(Russia) Abusupyan Alikhanov	def.	(Russia) Khalid Murtazaliev	KO (Punch)	4	0:53	GP Final For the inaugural FNG Middleweight Championship
Middleweight 84 kg	(Russia) Gasan Umalatov	def.	(Russia) Khalid Murtazaliev	TKO (Punches)	1	4:30	
Welterweight 77 kg	(Russia) Magomed Nurov	def.	(Greece) Panagiotis Stroumpoulis	KO (Head Kick)	2	2:37	
Catchweight 81.5 kg	(Russia) Aigun Akhmedov	def.	(England) Dez Parker	TKO (Referee Stoppage)	2	4:43	
Bantamweight 61 kg	(Russia) Sharamazan Chupanov	def.	(Russia) Salman Magomedov	Decision (Unanimous)	3	5:00	
Welterweight 77 kg	(Russia) Shamil Amirov	def.	(Russia) Konstantin Veselkin	TKO(Punches)	1	4:18	
Featherweight 66 kg	(Russia) Gadzhidaud Gasanov	def.	(Russia) Umar Tagirov	Submission (Guillotine Choke)	1	2:20	
Featherweight 66 kg	(Tajikistan) Emomali Kurbanov	def.	(Russia) Umar Tagirov	Submission (Arm triangle choke)	2	3:30	
Welterweight 77 kg	(Russia) Zelim Imadaev	def.	(Azerbaijan) Kenan Guliev	TKO (Referee Stoppage)	1	1:33	
Flyweight 57 kg	(Kyrgyzstan) Alimardan Abdykaarov	def.	(Russia) Murad Magomedov	TKO (Punches)	3	4:50	
Bantamweight 61 kg	(Russia) Ilmiyamin Dzhavadov	def.	(Russia) Mail Dzhenetov	TKO (Punches)	1	2:50	

== Fight Nights Global 67: Brandão vs. Galiev ==
FNG 67: Brandão vs. Galiev
- Promotion: Fight Nights Global
- Date: May 25, 2017
- Venue: DIVS Arena
- City: Ekaterinburg, Russia

Fight Nights Global 67: Brandão vs. Galiev was a mixed martial arts event held by Fight Nights Global on May 25, 2017, at the DIVS Arena in Ekaterinburg, Russia.

=== Results ===
Fight Card
Weight Class				Method	Round	Time	Notes
Featherweight 66 kg	(Brazil) Diego Brandão	def.	(Russia) Vener Galiev	TKO (Punches)	1	0:39	
Featherweight 66 kg	(Russia) Murad Machaev	def.	(Brazil) Ary Santos	Submission (Rear Naked Choke)	1	4:50	
Middleweight 84 kg	(Russia) Kurban Omarov	def.	(Russia) Artur Astakhov	KO (Punch)	1	0:27	
Featherweight 66 kg	(Russia) Aleksandr Yanyshev	def.	(Russia) Shamil Magomedov	Submission (Armbar)	2	3:49	
Catchweight 68 kg	(Russia) Ruslan Yamanbaev	def.	(Russia) Viktor Kichigin	Submission (Armbar)	2	2:26	
Bantamweight 61 kg	(Russia) Evgeniy Ignatiev	def.	(Russia) Artur Soloviev	Decision (Unanimous)	3	5:00	
Flyweight 57 kg	(Ukraine) Ivan Andrushchenko	def.	(Tajikistan) Shuhrat Khakimov	Decision (Unanimous)	3	5:00	
Lightweight 70 kg	(Russia) Danil Erlich	def.	(Kyrgyzstan) Maksutbek Baltabaev	Submission (Guillotine Choke)	1	1:58	
Catchweight 60 kg	(Russia) Azamat Pshukov	def.	(Russia) Timur Haziyev	Submission (Rear Naked Choke)	1	2:04	

== Fight Nights Global 68: Pavlovich vs. Mokhnatkin ==
FNG 68: Pavlovich vs. Mokhnatkin
- Promotion: Fight Nights Global
- Date: June 2, 2017
- Venue: Yubileyny Sports Palace
- City: Saint Petersburg, Russia

Fight Nights Global 68: Pavlovich vs. Mokhnatkin was a mixed martial arts event held by Fight Nights Global on June 2, 2017, at the Yubileyny Sports Palace in Saint Petersburg, Russia.

=== Results ===
Fight Card
Weight Class				Method	Round	Time	Notes
Heavyweight 120 kg	(Russia) Sergei Pavlovich	def.	(Russia) Mikhail Mokhnatkin	Decision (Unanimous)	5	5:00	GP Final For the inaugural FNG Heavyweight Championship
Heavyweight 120 kg	(Russia) Vitaly Minakov	def.	(Brazil) Antônio Silva	TKO (Punches)	2	1:37	
Light Heavyweight 93 kg	(Ukraine) Nikita Krylov	def.	(Croatia) Stipe Bekavac	Submission (Guillotine Choke)	1	0:53	
Heavyweight 120 kg	(United States) Tony Johnson	def.	(Russia) Magomedbag Agaev	KO (Punches)	1	1:20	
Welterweight 70 kg	(Russia) Oleg Dadonov	def.	(Greece) Jackie Gosh				
Middleweight 84 kg	(Russia) Rustam Chsiev	def.	(Georgia (country)) Georgi Lobzhanidze	TKO Punches)	3	3:30	
Light Heavyweight 93 kg	(Russia) Artur Guseinov	def.	(Tajikistan) Hasan Yousefi	KO (Punch)	2	0:52	
Catchweight 80 kg	(Russia) Vladimir Ivanov	def.	(Russia) Dmitry Aryshev	Decision (Unanimous)	3	5:00	
Welterweight 77 kg	(Russia) Vasiliy Zubkov	def.	(Russia) Islam Yashaev	Submission (Guillotine Choke)	1	5:00	

=== Fight Nights Global Heavyweight Grand-Prix bracket ===
Semi-Finals; FNG 54 & FNG 57
(Russia) Sergey Pavlovich	DEC
(Belarus) Alexei Kudin	3r.
(Russia) Kirill Sidelnikov	DEC
(Russia) Baga Agaev	3r.

Final; FN Global 68
(Russia) Sergey Pavlovich	DEC
(Russia) Mikhail Mokhnatkin	5r.

^{1}Kirill Sidelnikov was injured and couldn't participate in the Final of the Grand Prix, and was subsequently replaced by Mikhail Mokhnatkin.

== Fight Nights Global 69: Bagautinov vs. Nobre ==
FNG 69: Bagautinov vs. Nobre
- Promotion: Fight Nights Global
- Date: June 30, 2017
- Venue: Ice Sports Palace Sibir
- City: Novosibirsk, Russia

Fight Nights Global 69: Bagautinov vs. Nobre was a mixed martial arts event held by Fight Nights Global on June 30, 2017, at the Ice Sports Palace Sibir, in Novosibirsk, Russia.

=== Results ===
Fight Card
Weight Class				Method	Round	Time	Notes
Flyweight 57 kg	(Russia) Ali Bagautinov	def.	(Brazil) Pedro Nobre	Decision (Unanimous)	2	3:49	
Middleweight 84 kg	(Russia) Roman Kopylov	def.	(United States) Jacob Ortiz	TKO (Corner Stoppage)	2	5:00	
Lightweight 70 kg	(Russia) Nikolay Gaponov	def.	(England) Jack McGann	TKO (Punches)	1	0:37	
Light Heavyweight 93 kg	(Russia) Dmitry Minakov	def.	(Russia) Magomed Geroev	Decision (Unanimous)	3	5:00	
Light Heavyweight 93 kg	(Uzbekistan) Bogdan Guskov	def.	(Russia) Ilya Gunenko	KO (Punch)	2	0:31	
Female Bantamweight 61 kg	(Russia) Marina Mokhnatkina	def.	(Russia) Irina Degtyareva	Submission (Armbar)	1	1:26	
Lightweight 70 kg	(Uzbekistan) Makhamadzhon Kurbanov	def.	(Tajikistan) Iftihor Muminov	TKO (Punches)	1	3:50	
Bantamweight 61 kg	(Russia) Nikolai Baikin	def.	(Russia) Vladimir Alekseev	Decision (Unanimous)	3	5:00	
Featherweight 66 kg	(Russia) Murad Gasanov	def.	(Russia) Vyacheslav Pristenskiy	Decision (Unanimous)	3	5:00	

== Fight Nights Global 70: Palhares vs. Ivanov ==
FNG 70: Palhares vs. Ivanov
- Promotion: Fight Nights Global
- Date: July 7, 2017
- Venue: FSK Sports Complex
- City: Ulan-Ude, Russia

Fight Nights Global 70: Palhares vs. Ivanov was a mixed martial arts event held by Fight Nights Global on July 7, 2017, at the FSK Sports Complex in Ulan-Ude, Russia.

=== Results ===
Fight Card
Weight Class				Method	Round	Time	Notes
Welterweight 77 kg	(Brazil) Rousimar Palhares	def.	(Russia) Alexei Ivanov	Submission (Heel Hook)	1	0:37	
Bantamweight 61 kg	(Russia) Vadim Buseev	def.	(China) Yunpeng Guo	TKO (Punches)	1	2:46	
Welterweight 77 kg	(Russia) Maksim Butorin	vs.	(Canada) Mike Hill	DRAW	3	5:00	
Bantamweight 61 kg	(Kazakhstan) Sabit Zhusupov	def.	(Russia) Aldar Budanaev	Decision (Unanimous)	3	5:00	
Featherweight 66 kg	(Uzbekistan) Renat Ondar	def.	(Russia) Bato Damdinov	TKO (Punches)	3	4:14	
Welterweight 77 kg	(Russia) Dzhamal Ibragimgadzhiev	def.	(Kyrgyzstan) Samat Nurmamatov	TKO (Punches)	2	3:44	
Lightweight 70 kg	(Russia) Valeriy Mitrichuk	def.	(Mongolia) Batsuren Davaajamts	TKO (Punches)	1	4:27	
Bantamweight 61 kg	(Russia) Bair Asalkhanov	def.	(Russia) Vladimir Tsoi	Decision (Unanimous)	3	5:00	

== Fight Nights Global 71: Mineev vs. Michailidis ==
FNG 71: Mineev vs. Michailidis
- Promotion: Fight Nights Global
- Date: July 29, 2017
- Venue: Luzhniki Palace of Sports
- City: Moscow, Russia

Fight Nights Global 71: Mineev vs. Michailidis was a mixed martial arts event held by Fight Nights Global on July 29, 2017, at the Luzhniki Palace of Sports in Moscow, Russia.

=== Results ===
Fight Card
Weight Class				Method	Round	Time	Notes
Middleweight 84 kg	(Russia) Vladimir Mineev	def.	(Greece) Andreas Michailidis	TKO (Punches)	3	3:11	
Light Heavyweight 93 kg	(Russia) Mikhail Kabargin	def.	(Tajikistan) Abdul-Khamid Davlatov	TKO (Punches)	1	1:48	
Women’s Bantamweight 61 kg	(Georgia (country)) Liana Jojua	def.	(Russia) Karina Vasilenko	Submission (Armbar)	1	4:15	
Bantamweight 61 kg	(Russia) Umar Nurmagomedov	def.	(Uzbekistan) Valisher Rakhmonov	Submission (Rear-Naked Choke)	2	4:45	

== Fight Nights Global 72: Hill vs. Engibaryan ==
FNG 72: Hill vs. Engibaryan
- Promotion: Fight Nights Global
- Date: August 24, 2017
- Venue: Ice Cube
- City: Sochi, Russia

Fight Nights Global 72: Hill vs. Engibaryan was a mixed martial arts event held by Fight Nights Global on August 24, 2017, at the Ice Cube in Sochi, Russia.

=== Results ===
Fight Card
Weight Class				Method	Round	Time	Notes
Bantamweight 61 kg	(Canada) Josh Hill	def.	(Russia) Grachik Engibaryan	Submission (Rear Naked Choke)	1	4:12	
Lightweight 70 kg	(Russia) Islam Begidov	def.	(Republic of Ireland) Peter Queally	Decision (Majority)	3	5:00	

== Fight Nights Global 73: Aliev vs. Brandão ==
FNG 73: Aliev vs. Brandão
- Promotion: Fight Nights Global
- Date: September 4, 2017
- Venue: Ali Aliev Sports Palace
- City: Kaspiysk, Russia

Fight Nights Global 73: Aliev vs. Brandão was a mixed martial arts event held by Fight Nights Global on September 4, 2017, at the Ali Aliev Sports Palace in Kaspiysk, Russia.

=== Results ===
Fight Card
Weight Class				Method	Round	Time	Notes
Lightweight 70 kg	(Russia) Akhmet Aliev	def.	(Brazil) Diego Brandão	TKO (Retirement)	2	3:44	
Light Heavyweight 93 kg	(Brazil) Fábio Maldonado	def.	(Russia) Kurban Omarov	Submission (Guillotine Choke)	3	3:00	GP Final For the inaugural FNG Light Heavyweight Championship
Welterweight 77 kg	(Brazil) Rousimar Palhares	vs.	(Russia) Shamil Amirov	Draw (Split)	3	5:00	

== Fight Nights Global 74: Aleksakhin vs. Graves ==
FNG 74: Aleksakhin vs. Graves
- Promotion: Fight Nights Global
- Date: September 29, 2017
- Venue: Luzhniki Palace of Sports
- City: Moscow, Russia

Fight Nights Global 74: Aleksakhin vs. Graves was a mixed martial arts event held by Fight Nights Global on September 29, 2017, at the Luzhniki Palace of Sports in Moscow, Russia.

=== Results ===
Fight Card
Weight Class				Method	Round	Time	Notes
Welterweight 77 kg	(Russia) Nikolay Aleksakhin	def.	(United States) Michael Graves	TKO (Punches)	3	3:06	
Welterweight 77 kg	(Russia) Aliaskhab Khizriev	def.	(Switzerland) Yasubey Enomoto	Decision (Unanimous)	3	5:00	
Lightweight 70 kg	(Armenia) David Khachatryan	def.	(Switzerland) Ivan Musardo	Decision (Unanimous)	3	5:00	
Featherweight 66 kg	(Russia) Gadzhi Rabadanov	def.	(Kyrgyzstan) Turgunaly Abdullaev	TKO (Punches)	2	4:59	

== Fight Nights Global 75: Deák vs. Chistyakov ==
FNG 75: Deák vs. Chistyakov
- Promotion: Fight Nights Global
- Date: October 6, 2017
- Venue: Yubileyny Sports Palace
- City: Saint Petersburg, Russia

Fight Nights Global 75: Deák vs. Chistyakov was a mixed martial arts event held by Fight Nights Global on October 6, 2017, at the Yubileyny Sports Palace in Saint Petersburg, Russia.

=== Results ===
Fight Card
Weight Class				Method	Round	Time	Notes
Bantamweight 61 kg	(Slovakia) Tomáš Deák	def.	(Russia) Nikita Chistyakov	TKO (punches)	1	4:00	GP Final For the inaugural FNG Bantamweight Championship
Heavyweight 120 kg	(Russia) Mikhail Mokhnatkin	def.	(United States) Derrick Mehmen	Decision (unanimous)	3	5:00	
Flyweight 57 kg	(United States) Tyson Nam	def.	(Russia) Rizvan Abuev	KO (punch)	1	4:45	
Light Heavyweight 93 kg	(Russia) Aleksey Sidorenko	def.	(France) Malik Merad	TKO (punches)	1	3:10	

== Fight Nights Global 76: Bagautinov vs. Martinez ==
FNG 76: Bagautinov vs. Martinez
- Promotion: Fight Nights Global
- Date: October 8, 2017
- Venue: Olympus Arena
- City: Krasnodar, Russia

Fight Nights Global 76: Bagautinov vs. Martinez was a mixed martial arts event held by Fight Nights Global on October 8, 2017, at the Olympus Arena in Krasnodar, Russia.

=== Results ===
Fight Card
Weight Class				Method	Round	Time	Notes
Flyweight 57 kg	(Russia) Ali Bagautinov	def.	(United States) Danny Martinez	Decision (unanimous)	5	5:00	
Flyweight 57 kg	(Russia) Tagir Ulanbekov	def.	(Russia) Vartan Asatryan (c)	Submission (guillotine choke)	4	1:39	For the FNG Flyweight Championship
Lightweight 70 kg	(Russia) Ruslan Yamanbaev	def.	(Russia) Islam Begidov	TKO (flying knee and punches)	1	3:43	
Lightweight 70 kg	(Russia) Dinislam Kamavov	def.	(Russia) Zaur Kairov	Submission (arm triangle choke)	2	3:21	
Bantamweight 61 kg	(Russia) Umar Nurmagomedov	def.	(Russia) Nauruz Dzamikhov	Decision (unanimous)	3	3:00	
Lightweight 70 kg	(Russia) Igor Tarytsa	def.	(Azerbaijan) Akhad Mamedov	Decision (unanimous)	3	5:00	

== Fight Nights Global 77: Krylov vs. Newton ==
FNG 77: Krylov vs. Newton
- Promotion: Fight Nights Global
- Date: October 13, 2017
- Venue: SOK Energetik
- City: Surgut, Russia

Fight Nights Global 77: Krylov vs. Newton was a mixed martial arts event held by Fight Nights Global on October 13, 2017, at the SOK Energetik in Surgut, Russia.

=== Results ===
Fight Card
Weight Class				Method	Round	Time	Notes
Light Heavyweight 93 kg	(Ukraine) Nikita Krylov	def.	(United States) Emanuel Newton	KO (Knee)	1	0:43	
Featherweight 66 kg	(Russia) Movlid Khaybulaev	def.	(Russia) Ilya Kurzanov	Decision (Unanimous)	3	5:00	
Welterweight 77 kg	(Russia) Saigid Izagahmayev	def.	(Brazil) Valdir Araujo	Decision (Unanimous)	3	5:00	

== Fight Nights Global 78: Tsarev vs. Guseinov ==
FNG 78: Tsarev vs. Guseinov
- Promotion: Fight Nights Global
- Date: November 4, 2017
- Venue: Lada Arena
- City: Tolyatti, Russia

Fight Nights Global 78: Tsarev vs. Guseinov was a mixed martial arts event held by Fight Nights Global on November 4, 2017, at the Lada Arena in Tolyatti, Russia.

=== Results ===
Fight Card
Weight Class				Method	Round	Time	Notes
Light Heavyweight 93 kg	(Russia) Michail Tsarev	def.	(Russia) Artur Guseinov	TKO (Elbows)	1	4:26	
Middleweight 84 kg	(Russia) Ayub Gimbatov	def.	(Brazil) Maiquel Falcão	TKO (Punches)	1	4:12	
Heavyweight 120 kg	(Russia) Shamil Abasov	def.	(Russia) Georgy Sakaev	KO (Head Kick and Punches)	1	1:24	
Women's Bantamweight 61 kg	(Russia) Yulia Kutsenko	def.	(Russia) Zlata Sheftor	KO (Punches)	2	3:17	
Light Heavyweight 93 kg	(Iran) Hasan Yousefi	def.	(Russia) Dinislam Murtazaliev	TKO (Punches)	2	0:40	
Lightweight 70 kg	(Russia) Denis Izmodenov	def.	(Russia) Nikita Podkovalnikov	Decision (Unanimous)	3	5:00	
Lightweight 70 kg	(Russia) Anvar Chergesov	def.	(Kazakhstan) Adil Boranbayev	Decision (Unanimous)	3	5:00	
Featherweight 66 kg	(Russia) Anatoly Kondratiev	def.	(Russia) Magomed Isaev	Submission (Guillotine Choke)	1	4:30	
Welterweight 77 kg	(Georgia (country)) Levan Solodovnik	def.	(Russia) Magomed Isaev	Decision (Unanimous)	3	5:00	
Welterweight 77 kg	(Russia) Murat Khasanov	def.	(Russia) Alexander Khmara	Submission (Guillotine Choke)	1	0:30	
Lightweight 70 kg	(Russia) Maksim Panshin	def.	(Russia) Alisafa Mardaliev	Decision (Unanimous)	3	5:00	
Lightweight 70 kg	(Russia) Konstantin Nazarov	def.	(Russia) Grigory Vlasyan	Decision (Unanimous)	3	5:00	

== Fight Nights Global 79: Pavlovich vs. Sidelnikov ==
FNG 79: Pavlovich vs. Sidelnikov
- Promotion: Fight Nights Global
- Date: November 19, 2017
- Venue: Diesel Arena
- City: Penza, Russia

Fight Nights Global 79: Pavlovich vs. Sidelnikov was a mixed martial arts event held by Fight Nights Global on November 19, 2017, at the Diesel Arena in Penza, Russia.

=== Results ===
Fight Card
Weight Class				Method	Round	Time	Notes
Heavyweight 120 kg	(Russia) Sergei Pavlovich	def.	(Russia) Kirill Sidelnikov	TKO (punches)	1	2:45	For the FNG Heavyweight Championship
Heavyweight 120 kg	(Czech Republic) Viktor Pešta	def.	(Belarus) Alexei Kudin	Submission (Rear-Naked Choke)	1	4:52	
Light Heavyweight 93 kg	(Russia) Vladimir Seliverstov	def.	(Brazil) Charles Andrade	Decision (unanimous)	3	5:00	
Featherweight 66 kg	(Russia) Marat Magomedov	def.	(Russia) Rashad Muradov	Decision (unanimous)	3	5:00	
Welterweight 77 kg	(Russia) Rustam Madoyan	def.	(Russia) Mikhail Lebedev	KO (Punch)	1	0:30	
Lightweight 70 kg	(Russia) Ramil Mustapaev	def.	(Ukraine) Vagif Askerov	Submission (North-South Choke)	2	1:32	
Welterweight 77 kg	(Russia) Chermen Kobesov	def.	(Russia) Andrey Kurochkin	Submission (Guillotine Choke)	1	3:19	
Lightweight 70 kg	(Russia) Sergey Kistanov	def.	(Russia) Emil Khametov	Submission (Rear-Naked Choke)	1	4:28	
Lightweight 70 kg	(Russia) Ivan Okhlopkov	def.	(Russia) Mikhail Sarbashev	Submission (Guillotine Choke)	1	2:38	
Bantamweight 61 kg	(Russia) Ivan Laponov	def.	(Russia) Oleg Savkin	TKO (Punches)	2	4:15	

== Fight Nights Global 80: Khamitov vs. Queally ==
FNG 80: Khamitov vs. Queally
- Promotion: Fight Nights Global
- Date: November 26, 2017
- Venue: Almaty Arena
- City: Almaty, Kazakhstan

Fight Nights Global 80: Khamitov vs. Queally was a mixed martial arts event held by Fight Nights Global on November 26, 2017, at the Almaty Arena in Almaty, Kazakhstan.

=== Results ===
Fight Card
Weight Class				Method	Round	Time	Notes
Lightweight 70 kg	(Kazakhstan) Kuat Khamitov	vs.	(Republic of Ireland) Peter Queally	Draw	5	5:00	Original result overturned by Russian MMA Union
Welterweight 77 kg	(Kazakhstan) Georgiy Kichigin	def.	(Russia) Magomed Nurov	Submission (armbar)	4	2:15	For the FNG Welterweight Championship
Flyweight 57 kg	(Kazakhstan) Zhalgas Zhumagulov	def.	(Bangladesh) Shajidul Haque	Decision (unanimous)	3	5:00	

== Fight Nights Global 81: Matmuratov vs. Ignatiev ==
FNG 81: Matmuratov vs. Ignatiev
- Promotion: Fight Nights Global
- Date: December 15, 2017
- Venue: Arena Omsk
- City: Omsk, Russia

Fight Nights Global 81: Matmuratov vs. Ignatiev was a mixed martial arts event held by Fight Nights Global on December 15, 2017, at the Arena Omsk in Omsk, Russia.

=== Results ===
Fight Card
Weight Class				Method	Round	Time	Notes
Featherweight 66 kg	(Russia) Alexander Matmuratov	def.	(Russia) Evgeniy Ignatiev	Decision (unanimous)	5	5:00	For the FNG Featherweight Championship
Featherweight 66 kg	(Russia) Akhmed Balkizov	def.	(Kazakhstan) Zhasulan Akhimzanov	Decision (unanimous)	3	5:00	
W.Bantamweight 61 kg	(Russia) Marina Mokhnatkina	def.	(Brazil) Karine Silva	Submission (kneebar)	1	0:58	

== Fight Nights Global 82: Minakov vs. Johnson ==
FNG 82: Minakov vs. Johnson
- Promotion: Fight Nights Global
- Date: December 16, 2017
- Venue: Luzhniki Palace of Sports
- City: Moscow, Russia

Fight Nights Global 82: Minakov vs. Johnson will be a mixed martial arts event held by Fight Nights Global on December 16, 2017, at the Luzhniki Palace of Sports in Moscow, Russia.

=== Results ===
Fight Card
Weight Class				Method	Round	Time	Notes
Heavyweight 120 kg	(Russia) Vitaly Minakov	def.	(United States) Tony Johnson	TKO (punches)	2	0:38	
Lightweight 70 kg	(Russia) Vener Galiev	def.	(Russia) Nikolay Gaponov	KO (punches)	1	4:14	
Light Heavyweight 93 kg	(Turkey) Shamil Erdogan	vs.	(Brazil) Leonardo Silva de Oliveira	KO (punches)	3	3:14	
Lightweight 70 kg	(Russia) Alexandr Shabliy	def.	(Slovakia) Miroslav Štrbák	KO (punch)	2	3:02	
Middleweight 84 kg	(Russia) Khalid Murtazaliev	def.	(Poland) Grzegorz Siwy	TKO (punches)	1	4:31	
Welterweight 77 kg	(Russia) Dmitry Bikrev	def.	(Kazakhstan) Asif Tagiev	TKO (punches)	1	2:53	
