= 2010 in M-1 Global =

Mixed martial arts events

Information
- First date: February 5, 2010
- Last date: December 25, 2010

Events
- Total events: 39

Fights
- Total fights: 388

Chronology
2009 in M-1	2010 in M-1 Global	2011 in M-1

The year 2010 is the 14th year in the history of M-1 Global, a mixed martial arts promotion based in Russia. In 2010 M-1 Global held 37 events beginning with, M-1 Selection 2010: Western Europe Round 1.

== Events list ==
#	Event title	Date	Arena	Location
121	M-1 Selection Belarus: Finals	December 25, 2010	Minsk Sports Hall	Minsk, Belarus
120	Northwestern League of Combat Sambo: Tournament in Memory of Marshal Govorov	December 25, 2010	Taifun Club	Saint Petersburg, Russia
119	M-1 Challenge 22: Narkun vs. Vasilevsky	December 10, 2010	Druzhba Arena	Moscow, Russia
118	M-1 Ukraine: Battle of Champions	November 26, 2010	Simferopol Circus	Simferopol, Crimea, Ukraine
117	M-1 Selection Ukraine 2010: Round 6	November 6, 2010	Acco International Exhibition Center	Kyiv, Ukraine
116	M-1 Selection Belarus: Quarterfinals	November 6, 2010		Brest, Belarus
115	M-1 Challenge 21: Guram vs. Garner	October 28, 2010	Ice Palace Saint Petersburg	Saint Petersburg, Leningrad Oblast, Russia
114	M-1 Selection Ukraine 2010: Round 5	October 24, 2010		Donetsk, Donetsk Oblast, Ukraine
113	Northwestern League of Combat Sambo: Tournament in Memory of Private Korzun	October 23, 2010	Taifun Club	Saint Petersburg, Russia
112	M-1 Selection Belarus: First Round	October 17, 2010		Bobruysk, Mogilev Region, Belarus
111	M-1 Global: M-1 Ukraine Battle of Lions	October 1, 2010	Lviv Circus	Lviv, Lviv Oblast, Russia
110	M-1 Selection Ukraine 2010: Clash of the Titans	September 18, 2010	Acco International Exhibition Center	Kyiv, Ukraine
109	M-1 Selection 2010: The Americas Finals	September 18, 2010	Bally's Atlantic City	Atlantic City, New Jersey, United States
108	Northwestern League of Combat Sambo: Tournament in Memory of Partisan German	September 11, 2010		Saint Petersburg, Russia
107	M-1 Global: Battle on the Neva 4	August 19, 2010	The Flying Dutchman	Saint Petersburg, Russia
106	M-1 Selection Ukraine 2010: Round 3	August 10, 2010	Genova Fortress Hall	Sudak, Crimea, Ukraine
105	M-1 Fighter: Elimination Round	August 8, 2010		Saint Petersburg, Russia
104	M-1 Selection 2010: The Americas Round 3	August 7, 2010	Bally's Atlantic City	Atlantic City, New Jersey, United States
103	M-1 Selection 2010: Eastern Europe Finals	July 22, 2010		Moscow, Russia
102	Sambo-70 / M-1 Global: Sochi Open European Championships	July 14, 2010		Sochi, Russia
101	M-1 Fighter 2010: Stage 1	July 10, 2010		Saint Petersburg, Russia
100	M-1 Selection 2010: Asia Finals	July 3, 2010	Tokyo Dome City Hall	Tokyo, Japan
99	M-1 Selection 2010: The Americas Round 2	June 26, 2010	Bally's Atlantic City	Atlantic City, New Jersey, United States
98	M-1 Belarus: Belarus vs. Ukraine	June 4, 2010	Bobruysk Arena	Bobruysk, Mogilev Region, Belarus
97	M-1 Selection 2010: Western Europe Round 3	May 29, 2010	Helsinki Ice Hall	Helsinki, Uusimaa, Finland
96	M-1 Selection 2010: Eastern Europe Round 3	May 28, 2010	National Circus of Ukraine	Kyiv, Ukraine
95	M-1 Georgia: M-1 Georgia 2010	May 15, 2010		Tbilisi, Georgia
94	M-1 Selection 2010: Western Europe Reserve Matches	May 8, 2010	Wellness Profi Center	Pumerand, North Holland, Netherlands
93	M-1 Selection Ukraine 2010: Round 2	May 7, 2010	National Circus	Kyiv, Ukraine
92	Northwestern League of Combat Sambo: Tournament in Memory of Marshal Zhukov	April 29, 2010	Etazh club	Saint Petersburg, Russia
91	M-1 Ukraine: 2010 Selections 1	April 29, 2010	Simferopol Circus	Simferopol, Crimea, Ukraine
90	M-1 Selection 2010: Japan Round 1	April 16, 2010	Shinjuku Face	Tokyo, Japan
89	M-1 Selection 2010: Eastern Europe Round 2	April 10, 2010	National Circus of Ukraine	Kyiv, Ukraine
88	M-1 Selection 2010: The Americas Round 1	April 3, 2010	Bally's Atlantic City	Atlantic City, New Jersey, United States
87	M-1 Selection 2010: Western Europe Round 2	March 27, 2010	Studio 11	Weesp, North Holland, Netherlands
86	M-1 Challenge: Belarus	March 20, 2010		Brest, Belarus
85	M-1 Selection 2010: Asia Round 1	March 5, 2010	Olympic Hall	Seoul, South Korea
84	M-1 Selection 2010: Eastern Europe Round 1	February 26, 2010	Yubileyny Sports Palace	Saint Petersburg, Leningrad Oblast, Russia
83	M-1 Selection 2010: Western Europe Round 1	February 5, 2010	Studio 31	Hilversum, North Holland, Netherlands

== M-1 Selection 2010: Western Europe Round 1 ==
M-1 Selection 2010: Western Europe Round 1 was an event held on February 5, 2010, at Studio 31 in Hilversum, North Holland, Netherlands.

=== Results ===
Main Card
Weight class				Method	Round	Time	Notes
	Cindy Dandois	def.	Maria Hougaard Djursaa	TKO (Punches)	1	1:12
	Jermaine Voetman	def.	Geronimo de Groot	TKO (Punches)	2	1:49
	Ahmed Bayrak	def.	Clarence Noordzee	Submission (Rear-Naked Choke)	1	3:38
	Rafal Moks	def.	Serghei Popa	Submission (Rear-Naked Choke)	1	4:13
	Danijel Dzebic	def.	Lopez Owonyebe	Submission (Heel Hook)	1	0:59
	Miljan Jaksic	def.	Jaouad Ikan	Submission (Rear-Naked Choke)	1	4:28
	Semih Arslan	def.	Jedrzej Kubski	Decision (Split)	3	5:00
	Abner Lloveras	def.	Sunnat Ilyasov	KO (Knee)	2	1:18
	Ville Rasanen	def.	Joao Neves	Submission (Arm-Triangle Choke)	1	3:08
	Victor Kuku	def.	Jawaad Hussein	Submission (Flying Knee)	1	1:29
	Danial Sharifi	def.	Deividas Flederzinkas	Submission (Armbar)	1	2:42
	Mairbek Taisumov	def.	Borys Mankowski	TKO (Punches)	2	0:55
	Julien Boussuge	def.	Ivica Truscek	Submission (Kimura)	1	2:11
	Fatih Dogan	def.	Patrick Asscher	TKO (Punches)	1	0:00

== M-1 Selection 2010: Eastern Europe Round 1 ==
M-1 Selection 2010: Eastern Europe Round 1 was an event held on February 26, 2010, at The Yubileyny Sports Palace in Saint Petersburg, Leningrad Oblast, Russia.

=== Results ===
Main Card
Weight class				Method	Round	Time	Notes
	Alikhan Magomedov	def.	Ibragim Halilov	Submission (Rear-Naked Choke)	2	0:44
	Shamil Tinagadjiev	def.	Igor Savelyev	Submission (Rear-Naked Choke)	1	3:10
	Rasul Magomedov	def.	Ilya Malyukov	Decision (Split)	3	5:00
	Murad Magomedov	def.	Ruslan Khaskhanov	Submission (Armbar)	2	0:38
	Alexei Belyaev	def.	Gasan Umalatov	Decision (Split)	3	5:00
	Dibir Zagirov	def.	Anatoly Lavrov	Decision (Unanimous)	3	5:00
	Magomed Sultanakhmedov	def.	Pavel Kusch	KO (Punch)	3	0:56
	Artiom Damkovsky	def.	Shamil Abdulkerimov	Decision (Unanimous)	3	5:00
	Arsen Ubaidulaev	def.	Yuri Saakyan	Decision (Unanimous)	3	5:00
	Alexander Sarnavskiy	def.	Maxim Kuptsov	Submission (Rear-Naked Choke)	1	4:03
	Karen Grigoryan	def.	Magomed Magomedov	Submission (Rear-Naked Choke)	2	1:56
	Ratmir Teuvazhukov	def.	Maxim Rozhkov	Submission (Triangle Choke)	1	2:10

== M-1 Selection 2010: Asia Round 1 ==
M-1 Selection 2010: Asia Round 1 was an event held on March 5, 2010, at Olympic Hall in Seoul, South Korea.

=== Results ===
Main Card
Weight class				Method	Round	Time	Notes
	Young Jun Jang	def.	Chang Hee Kim	TKO (Punches)	1	1:31
	Jong Jik Kim	def.	Won Ho Seo	TKO (Knee to the Body and Punches)	1	5:00
	Jee Hyun Choi	def.	Yoon Seob Kwak	Submission (Arm-Triangle Choke)	1	2:20
	Hee Seung Kim	def.	Han Keun Lee	Decision (Unanimous)	3	5:00
	No Joo Ki	def.	Ji Sun Jeon	TKO (Punches)	1	3:10
	Yong Jae Lee	def.	Jung Yong Yu	TKO (Punches)	2	3:26
	Jun-Hee Moon	def.	Ho Joong Kim	Submission (Omoplata)	2	2:21
	Bae Yong Kwon	def.	Tae Hwan Bae	TKO (Punches)	1	1:38
	Choi Doo-ho	def.	Jong Hwa Lee	TKO (Punches)	2	3:20
	Gyo Pyung Hwang	def.	Jae Suk Lee	TKO (Retirement)	1	5:00
	Min Gu Lee	def.	Jin Min Song	Decision (Unanimous)	2	5:00

== M-1 Challenge: Belarus ==
M-1 Challenge: Belarus was an event held on March 20, 2010, in Brest, Belarus.

=== Results ===
Main Card
Weight class				Method	Round	Time	Notes
	Alexei Kudin	def.	Denis Ivanets	Submission (Punches)	1	1:58

== M-1 Selection 2010: Western Europe Round 2 ==
M-1 Selection 2010: Western Europe Round 2 was an event held on March 27, 2010, at Studio 11 in Weesp, North Holland, Netherlands.

=== Results ===
Main Card
Weight class				Method	Round	Time	Notes
	Robert Jocz	def.	Nathan Schouteren	Submission (Armbar)	1	3:47
	Victor Kuku	def.	Fatih Dogan	KO (Flying Knee)	2	2:23
	Drazen Forgac	def.	Arya Hosseni	TKO (Punch)	2	1:25
	Guram Gugenishvili	def.	Jur Dekker	Submission (Rear-Naked Choke)	1	0:36
	Dawid Baziak	def.	Borislav Iglev	Submission (Rear-Naked Choke)	1	4:42
	Cindy Dandois	def.	Daria Ibragimova	Submission (Triangle Choke)	1	3:02
	Hracho Darpinyan	def.	Roodi Troost	Submission (Slam and Punches)	1	0:32
	David Tkeshelashvili	def.	Haik Soukiasian	Decision (Unanimous)	3	5:00
	Timo Karttunen	def.	Johan Romming	Submission (Rear-Naked Choke)	2	3:10
	Tomasz Narkun	def.	Olutobi Ayodeji Kalejaiye	Submission (Rear-Naked Choke)	1	0:52
	David Everts	def.	Patrick Asscher	TKO (Punches)	1	0:00
	Jeroen Jansen	def.	Paul Gruntjes	Submission (Armbar)	1	0:00

== M-1 Selection 2010: The Americas Round 1 ==
M-1 Selection 2010: The Americas Round 1 was an event held on April 3, 2010, at Bally's Atlantic City in Atlantic City, New Jersey, United States.

=== Results ===
Main Card
Weight class				Method	Round	Time	Notes
	Zach Makovsky	def.	Josh Rave	Technical Submission (Guillotine Choke)	3	1:49
	Pat Audinwood	def.	Robert Conner	Decision (Unanimous)	3	5:00
	Dennis Bermudez	def.	Kevin Roddy	Decision (Unanimous)	3	5:00
	George Sheppard	def.	Mervin Rodriguez	Decision (Split)	3	5:00
	John Salgado	def.	Renato Migliaccio	Decision (Split)	3	5:00
	Mike Geurin	def.	Todd Chattelle	TKO (Punches)	3	0:32
	Plinio Cruz	def.	John Doyle	Decision (Unanimous)	3	5:00
	Lennox Chance	def.	Rami Ibrahim	Submission (Rear-Naked Choke)	1	4:46
	Colin Schrader	def.	Josh Smidt	Submission (Guillotine Choke)	1	0:30

== M-1 Selection 2010: Eastern Europe Round 2 ==
M-1 Selection 2010: Eastern Europe Round 2 was an event held on April 10, 2010, at The National Circus of Ukraine in Kyiv, Ukraine.

=== Results ===
Main Card
Weight class				Method	Round	Time	Notes
	Valeriy Shcherbakov	def.	Ibragim Ibragimov	DQ (Soccer Kick)	1	3:10
	Murad Magomedov	def.	Ali Omarov	TKO (Punches)	2	2:03
	Alexander Romaschenko	def.	Ruslan Stepanyan	TKO (Punches)	1	1:50
	Alexander Volkov	def.	Vitalii Yalovenko	TKO (Doctor Stoppage)	2	1:05
	Maxim Grishin	def.	Gadzhimurad Nurmagomedov	TKO (Punches)	1	2:05
	Arsen Abdulkerimov	def.	Denis Komkin	KO (Punch)	1	3:05
	Vyacheslav Vasilevsky	def.	Sergey Guzev	Decision (Split)	3	5:00
	Magomedrasul Khasbulaev	def.	Rashid Magomedov	Decision (Split)	3	5:00
	Arsen Temirkhanov	def.	Vladimir Opanasenko	Submission (Rear-Naked Choke)	2	0:00
	Shamil Zavurov	def.	Radik Iboyan	TKO (Punches)	2	3:54
	Ramazan Abdulzhalilov	def.	Said Khalilov	Submission (Rear-Naked Choke)	1	1:05
	Vitaly Minakov	def.	Ruslan Kabdulin	Submission (Armbar)	1	0:00
	Viktor Nemkov	def.	Shamil Vajsurov	Decision (Unanimous)	2	5:00
	Abdul-Kerim Edilov	def.	Igor Savelyev	Decision (Unanimous)	2	5:00
	Isa Musaev	def.	Ivan Kosov	Decision (Unanimous)	2	5:00
	Maxim Kuptsov	def.	Kuanysh Turmyshev	Submission (Armbar)	2	1:16
	Shahriyar Abbasov	def.	Ishkhan Zakharian	Submission (Armbar)	2	3:31
	Anzor Kardanov	def.	Bislan Atleshev	Decision (Unanimous)	3	5:00

== M-1 Selection 2010: Japan Round 1 ==
M-1 Selection 2010: Japan Round 1 was an event held on April 16, 2010, at Shinjuku Face in Tokyo, Japan.

=== Results ===
Main Card
Weight class				Method	Round	Time	Notes
	Motohiro Tachihara	def.	Yoshiyuki Nagase	Submission (Heel Hook)	1	0:00
	Nobuo Odakura	def.	Edison dos Santos	Technical Submission (Arm-Triangle Choke)	1	0:00
	Fernando Wolverine	def.	Kazuki Nakajima	Decision (Unanimous)	3	5:00
	Hiromu Nagado	def.	Kazuki Nakatake	Submission (Triangle Choke)	1	0:00
	Yusuke Kasuya	def.	Kenjiro Takahashi	TKO (Doctor Stoppage)	2	0:00
	Toshikatsu Harada	def.	Nobuo Kosaka	Submission (Rear-Naked Choke)	2	0:00
	Masaki Kosugi	def.	Shinji Tsukataru	TKO (Punches)	1	0:00
	Shogo Ohashi	def.	Junpei Nakamura	TKO (Punches)	1	0:00

== M-1 Ukraine: 2010 Selections 1 ==
M-1 Ukraine: 2010 Selections 1 was an event held on April 29, 2010, at Simferopol Circus in Simferopol, Crimea, Ukraine.

=== Results ===
Main Card
Weight class				Method	Round	Time	Notes
	Vahan Bojukyan	def.	Evgeni Babich	KO (Punch)	1	0:00
	Vasily Klepikov	def.	Abdulkhalik Magomedov	KO (Punch)	1	0:13
	Igor Shpatenko	def.	Murad Kamilov	Submission	1	0:00
	Alexej Savastenko	def.	Sergey Tkachenko	Submission	1	0:00
	Kirill Krikunov	def.	Alim Ablyakimov	Submission	1	0:00
	Andrei Balabolkin	def.	Andrei Shtefan	Submission (Rear-Naked Choke)	2	4:40
	Renat Lyatifov	def.	Sergey Kolotsey	Submission	1	0:00
	Igor Kukurudziak	def.	Sergey Kudinov	TKO (Punches)	1	2:33
	Abdurahman Nurmagomedov	def.	Andrei Embolaev	Submission (Armbar)	1	2:40
	Pavel Pokatilov	def.	Artyom Egorov	TKO (Punches)	2	0:00
	Igor Grytskiv	def.	Alexander Agafonov	Decision (Unanimous)	2	5:00
	Vadim Khaitulov	def.	Peter Gruby	TKO (Corner Stoppage)	2	5:00
	Pavel Katrunov	def.	Artem Akopyan	Submission (Rear-Naked Choke)	1	0:00
	Denis Glukhov	def.	Dmitry Karpenko	Submission (Armbar)	1	0:00

== Northwestern League of Combat Sambo: Tournament in Memory of Marshal Zhukov ==
Northwestern League of Combat Sambo: Tournament in Memory of Marshal Zhukov was an event held on April 29, 2010, at Etazh club in Saint Petersburg, Russia.

=== Results ===
Main Card
Weight class				Method	Round	Time	Notes
	Akhmed Zulfikarov	def.	Sergey Lepenin	TKO (Punches)	1	1:38
	Anton Kostischin	def.	Ruslan Agaev	Submission (Armbar)	1	1:51
	Arsen Magomedov	def.	Davrbek Isakov	Submission (Rear-Naked Choke)	1	2:56
	Sadig Kerimov	def.	Anton Telepnev	Submission (Armbar)	1	1:21
	Ramis Kurbanov	def.	Ivan Telkov	Submission (Armbar)	1	1:24
	Yaroslav Bizyaev	def.	Vladimir Naumchuk	Submission (Rear-Naked Choke)	1	3:03
	Rustam Abdurapov	def.	Yuri Lagoida	Submission (Armbar)	2	1:29

== M-1 Selection Ukraine 2010: Round 2 ==
M-1 Selection Ukraine 2010: Round 2 was an event held on May 7, 2010, at National Circus in Kyiv, Ukraine.

=== Results ===
Main Card
Weight class				Method	Round	Time	Notes
	Alexander Dolotenko	def.	Sergei Radko	Submission (Rear-Naked Choke)	3	3:45
	Ruslan Khaskhanov	def.	Denis Gunich	Submission (Armbar)	1	0:20
	Vitaliy Ostrovskiy	def.	Vladimir Opanasenko	KO (Punch)	1	4:24
	Serhiy Adamchuk	def.	Eduard Pestrak	TKO (Punches)	1	0:44
	Vladimir Kryzhanovsky	def.	Roman Bagin	Submission (Anaconda Choke)	2	2:32
	Anatoly Safronov	def.	Rostislav Khvorost	Submission (Armbar)	1	2:45
	Roman Savochka	def.	Ivan Bogdanov	Submission (Armbar)	1	1:42
	Pavel Snigur	def.	Ilya Vityuk	TKO (Punches)	2	2:43
	Rustam Khabilov	def.	Andrei Balakhonov	Submission (Armbar)	1	1:34
	Alexander Voitenko	def.	Konstantin Molodanov	Submission (Heel Hook)	1	1:10
	Andrei Prizyuk	def.	Alexander Zinchenko	Submission (Rear-Naked Choke)	1	0:32
	Andrei Tiupin	def.	Pavel Andrutsky	Submission (Armbar)	1	0:23
	Yuri Saakyan	def.	Igor Zaytsev	Submission (Triangle Choke)	1	4:30

== M-1 Selection 2010: Western Europe Reserve Matches ==
M-1 Selection 2010: Western Europe Reserve Matches was an event held on May 8, 2010, at The Wellness Profi Center in Pumerand, North Holland, Netherlands.

=== Results ===
Main Card
Weight class				Method	Round	Time	Notes
	Alen Dolicanin	def.	Jamy Sanders	TKO (Punches)	3	0:00
	Tomislav Spahovic	def.	Christoph Meyer	TKO (Punches)	1	0:00
	Islam Dugazaev	def.	Micha Van Bellen	Decision (Unanimous)	3	5:00
	Berrie Bunthof	def.	Ivica Jakopic	Submission (Triangle Choke)	2	0:00
	Sebastian Nowak	def.	Jimmy Immonen	Submission (Rear-Naked Choke)	3	3:35

== M-1 Georgia: M-1 Georgia 2010 ==
M-1 Georgia: M-1 Georgia 2010 was an event held on May 15, 2010, in Tbilisi, Georgia.

=== Results ===
Main Card
Weight class				Method	Round	Time	Notes
	Shota Akulashvili	def.	Gia Barkalaia	TKO	1	0:00
	Davit Koberidze	def.	Zviad Kabaliya	Decision	3	0:00
	Emzar Tkeshelashvili	def.	Jaba Shioshvili	Submission	2	0:00
	Paata Robakidze	def.	Gocha Smoyan	Decision	3	0:00
	Guram Kutateladze	def.	Dimitri Izoria	Submission (Armbar)	1	0:00
	Michael Goriashvili	def.	Giorgi Khufenia	Submission (Guillotine Choke)	1	0:00

== M-1 Selection 2010: Eastern Europe Round 3 ==
M-1 Selection 2010: Eastern Europe Round 3 was an event held on May 28, 2010, at The National Circus of Ukraine in Kyiv, Ukraine.

=== Results ===
Main Card
Weight class				Method	Round	Time	Notes
	Mayindur Magomedov	def.	Visampasha Mirzakhanov	N/A	3	0:00
	Islam Edilgeriev	def.	David Grigoryan	Decision (Unanimous)	2	5:00
	Alexander Agafonov	def.	Sergey Tkachenko	Submission (Armbar)	1	0:00
	Vadim Khaitulov	def.	Yuri Saakyan	Decision (Unanimous)	2	5:00
	Guram Gugenishvili	def.	Valeriy Shcherbakov	Submission (Punches)	1	2:00
	David Tkeshelashvili	def.	Hracho Darpinyan	Decision (Unanimous)	3	5:00
	Alexander Volkov	def.	Alexander Romaschenko	Submission (Rear-Naked Choke)	1	2:59
	Maxim Grishin	def.	Arsen Abdulkerimov	TKO (Punches)	1	1:52
	Vyacheslav Vasilevsky	def.	Alikhan Magomedov	Submission (Rear-Naked Choke)	1	3:21
	Shamil Tinagadjiev	def.	Murad Magomedov	TKO (Punches)	2	3:26
	Alexei Belyaev	def.	Murad Magomedov	Decision (Unanimous)	3	5:00
	Magomed Sultanakhmedov	def.	Dibir Zagirov	KO (Punch)	1	0:00
	Magomedrasul Khasbulaev	def.	Radik Iboyan	Submission (Armbar)	1	1:50
	Shamil Zavurov	def.	Ramazan Abdulzhalilov	Decision (Unanimous)	3	5:00
	Artiom Damkovsky	def.	Arsen Ubaidulaev	Decision (Unanimous)	3	5:00
	Alexander Sarnavskiy	def.	Karen Grigoryan	Decision (Split)	3	5:00
	Daria Ibragimova	def.	Ludmila Radko	Submission (Rear-Naked Choke)	1	0:34

== M-1 Selection 2010: Western Europe Round 3 ==
M-1 Selection 2010: Western Europe Round 3 was an event held on May 29, 2010, at The Helsinki Ice Hall in Helsinki, Uusimaa, Finland.

=== Results ===
Main Card
Weight class				Method	Round	Time	Notes
	Yuri Ivlev	def.	Mario Stapel	KO (Punches)	1	3:18
	Jordan Radev	def.	Maro Perak	Decision (Split)	3	5:00
	Cindy Dandois	def.	Sheila Gaff	DQ (Illegal Knee to the Head)	3	0:10
	Dawid Baziak	def.	Drazen Forgac	Submission (Punches)	2	4:38
	Tomasz Narkun	def.	Timo Karttunen	Submission (Triangle Armbar)	1	0:49
	Ahmed Bayrak	def.	Jermaine Voetman	Submission (Armbar)	1	2:11
	Rafal Moks	def.	Danijel Dzebic	Submission (Guillotine Choke)	1	4:56
	David Bielkheden	def.	Musa Khamanaev	TKO (Punches)	2	1:57
	Matteus Lahdesmaki	def.	Jean Robert Monier	Submission (Rear-Naked Choke)	1	2:28
	Abner Lloveras	def.	Miljan Jaksic	Submission (Rear-Naked Choke)	1	4:20
	Berrie Bunthof	def.	Semih Arslan	Submission (Rear-Naked Choke)	2	4:52
	Victor Kuku	def.	Sebastian Nowak	TKO (Punches)	3	1:02
	Mairbek Taisumov	def.	Julien Boussuge	KO (Punch)	1	4:11
	Michael Gronfors	def.	Kriss Larcin	Submission (Guillotine Choke)	1	0:35
	Jani Lax	def.	Danny van Bergen	Submission (Armbar)	1	2:40
	Juha Saarinen	def.	Enoc Solves Torres	Submission (Kimura)	1	3:09

== M-1 Belarus: Belarus vs. Ukraine ==
M-1 Belarus: Belarus vs. Ukraine was an event held on June 4, 2010, at Bobruysk Arena in Bobruysk, Mogilev Region, Belarus.

=== Results ===
Main Card
Weight class				Method	Round	Time	Notes
	Vladena Yavorskaya	def.	Ludmila Radko	Submission	1	0:00
	Alexander Kozyr	def.	Eduard Pestrak	Submission	1	0:00
	Zamin Guseinov	def.	Grachik Gevorgyan	TKO (Punches)	1	0:00
	Vitaliy Ostrovskiy	def.	Anatoly Safronov	Submission (Rear-Naked Choke)	1	0:00
	Denis Gunich	def.	Ivan Polischuk	Submission (Rear-Naked Choke)	1	0:00
	Maksim Protesenya	def.	Sergey Molchanov	Decision (Unanimous)	2	5:00
	Ivan Gladkiy	def.	Evgeny Ogurtsov	TKO (Punches)	1	0:00
	Oleg Sirich	def.	Denis Bulovatskiy	Submission	1	0:00
	Sergey Faley	def.	Anton Kononyuk	Submission	1	0:00
	Aleksander Miroshnichenko	def.	Sergey Nesterenko	Submission	1	0:00

== M-1 Selection 2010: The Americas Round 2 ==
M-1 Selection 2010: The Americas Round 2 was an event held on June 26, 2010, at Bally's Atlantic City in Atlantic City, New Jersey, United States.

=== Results ===
Main Card
Weight class				Method	Round	Time	Notes
	Tom Gallicchio	def.	Reggie Pena	Decision (Split)	3	5:00
	Shane Primm	def.	Wesley Welch	Submission (Guillotine Choke)	2	0:39
	Pat Bennett	def.	Nick Smiley	KO (Punches)	1	0:37
	Josh Bacallao	vs.	Joshua Key	NC (Key Fell From Ring)	1	2:44
	Kenny Garner	def.	Matt Hopkins	TKO (Punches)	1	1:56
	Andrei Kapylou	def.	Ed Carpenter	Submission (Guillotine Choke)	1	1:09
	Tyson Jeffries	def.	Mike Johnson	Submission (Eye Injury)	3	1:59
	Aaron Meisner	def.	Vagner Fernandes	TKO (Knees and Punches)	1	0:25
	Byron Byrd	def.	Mike Shenkenberg	KO (Punch)	1	0:10
	Mehdi Hassan	def.	Robert Leonard	KO (Punch)	1	3:34
	Daniel Vizcaya	def.	Ariel Sepulveda	KO (Punches)	1	4:40
	Robert Rodriguez	def.	Antuan Mitchell	TKO (Punches)	3	4:29

== M-1 Selection 2010: Asia Finals ==
M-1 Selection 2010: Asia Finals was an event held on July 3, 2010, at Tokyo Dome City Hall in Tokyo, Japan.

=== Results ===
Main Card
Weight class				Method	Round	Time	Notes
	Hae Jun Yang	def.	Edmund Cavalcante Jr.	TKO (Punch)	1	3:31
	Tae Hyun Bang	def.	Cameron Silva	TKO (Punches)	1	3:02
	Jong-Dae Kim	def.	Chohei Kimura	TKO (Punches)	1	2:55
	Maurcio Ishizuka	def.	Jong Hwa Lee	Submission (Armbar)	1	2:41
	Won Ho Seo	def.	Motohiro Tachihara	TKO (Punches)	1	2:37
	Nobuo Odakura	def.	Jee Hyun Choi	Decision (Unanimous)	3	5:00
	Hee Seung Kim	def.	Gabriel Tomikawa	Submission (Straight Armbar)	1	0:53
	Hiromu Nagado	def.	Jae Ho Jeon	Submission (Arm-Triangle Choke)	1	1:38
	Han Keun Lee	def.	Kazutoshi Fujita	Decision (Unanimous)	3	5:00
	Jun-Hee Moon	def.	Yusuke Horimoto	Submission (Triangle Choke)	2	4:03
	Jung Gi Hong	def.	Masaki Kosugi	Submission (Rear-Naked Choke)	1	1:18
	Toshikatsu Harada	def.	Eui Hwan Joo	Submission (Rear-Naked Choke)	1	3:27
	Takeo Iida	def.	Koichi Sugi	Decision (Unanimous)	2	5:00
	2Face 2Face	def.	Tobizaru Tobizaru	DQ (Punches to Back of Head)	2	2:27
	Hiroki Narita	def.	Katsuya Nagamine	Decision (Split)	2	5:00
	Hitoshi Okada	def.	Ryosuke Taihei	TKO (Punches)	2	1:02
	Kenta Tamura	def.	Yosuke Takahashi	Decision (Unanimous)	2	5:00
	Kazuki Ogawa	def.	Hiroki Nakamura	Technical Submission (Armbar)	1	2:48

== M-1 Fighter 2010: Stage 1 ==
M-1 Fighter 2010: Stage 1 was an event held on July 10, 2010, in Saint Petersburg, Russia.

=== Results ===
Main Card
Weight class				Method	Round	Time	Notes
	Evgeni Myakinkin	def.	Igor Kukurudziak	Submission (Choke)	2	2:00
	Arsen Abdulkerimov	def.	Gadzhimurad Nurmagomedov	Submission (Armbar)	1	3:30
	Vasily Klepikov	def.	Igor Savelyev	TKO (Punches)	1	2:00
	Viktor Nemkov	def.	Artur Korchemny	Submission (Arm-Triangle Choke)	1	2:55
	Ruslan Khaskhanov	def.	Abdula Mutalimov	Submission (Leg Lock)	1	1:00
	Gasanali Gasanaliev	def.	Alexander Agafonov	Decision (Unanimous)	3	5:00
	Anton Telepnev	def.	Vitaliy Ostrovskiy	Decision (Unanimous)	2	5:00
	Vadim Khaitulov	def.	Dmitry Godynsky	TKO (Punches)	2	0:10
	Vusal Bayramov	def.	Denis Glukhov	TKO (Doctor Stoppage)	1	5:00

== Sambo-70 / M-1 Global: Sochi Open European Championships ==
Sambo-70 / M-1 Global: Sochi Open European Championships was an event held on July 14, 2010, in Sochi, Russia.

=== Results ===
Main Card
Weight class				Method	Round	Time	Notes
	Vyacheslav Vasilevsky	def.	Xavier Foupa-Pokam	Submission (Rear-Naked Choke)	3	1:58
	Vitaly Minakov	def.	Alexander Zubachov	Submission (Rear-Naked Choke)	1	0:27
	Dmitry Zabolotny	def.	Serge Canario	TKO (Punches)	1	4:51
	Dmitry Samoilov	def.	Sebastian Libebe	Submission (Armbar)	2	2:18
	Jerome Bouisson	def.	Maxim Kuptsov	Decision (Split)	3	5:00
	Yuri Ivlev	def.	Daniel Thomas	KO (Punch)	2	3:14
	Rashid Magomedov	def.	Dan Hope	KO (Punch)	1	0:57

== M-1 Selection 2010: Eastern Europe Finals ==
M-1 Selection 2010: Eastern Europe Finals was an event held on July 22, 2010, in Moscow, Russia.

=== Results ===
Main Card
Weight class				Method	Round	Time	Notes
	Maxim Grishin	def.	Alexander Volkov	Submission (Rear-Naked Choke)	1	2:39
	Magomed Sultanakhmedov	def.	Alexei Belyaev	TKO (Punches)	2	0:23
	Shamil Zavurov	def.	Magomedrasul Khasbulaev	Submission (Rear-Naked Choke)	1	3:16
	Artiom Damkovsky	def.	Arsen Ubaidulaev	Decision (Unanimous)	3	5:00
	Magomed Shikshabekov	def.	Marvin Aboeli	Submission (Triangle Choke)	1	1:09
	Guram Gugenishvili	def.	Alexander Romaschenko	Submission (Rear-Naked Choke)	1	1:25
	Tomasz Narkun	def.	David Tkeshelashvili	Submission (Rear-Naked Choke)	1	1:50
	Rafal Moks	def.	Ahmed Bayrak	Decision (Unanimous)	3	5:00
	Abner Lloveras	def.	Berrie Bunthof	KO (Punch)	1	3:23
	Mairbek Taisumov	def.	Serhiy Adamchuk	Submission (Rear-Naked Choke)	1	3:04
	Vitaly Minakov	def.	Vitalii Yalovenko	Decision (Unanimous)	3	5:00
	Shamil Tinagadjiev	def.	Andrei Embolaev	Submission (Armbar)	1	0:00

== M-1 Selection 2010: The Americas Round 3 ==
M-1 Selection 2010: The Americas Round 3 was an event held on August 7, 2010, at Bally's Atlantic City in Atlantic City, New Jersey, United States.

=== Results ===
Main Card
Weight class				Method	Round	Time	Notes
	Tom Gallicchio	def.	Aaron Meisner	Submission (Rear-Naked Choke)	3	1:26
	Kenny Garner	def.	Andrei Kapylou	Decision (Unanimous)	3	5:00
	Tyson Jeffries	def.	Plinio Cruz	Decision (Split)	3	5:00
	Pat Bennett	def.	Mehdi Hassan	Decision (Unanimous)	3	5:00
	Mike Geurin	def.	Shane Primm	Decision (Unanimous)	3	5:00
	Daniel Vizcaya	def.	Chris Sydnor	Submission (Arm-Triangle Choke)	1	2:02
	Len Bentley	def.	Colin Schrader	KO (Punch)	2	1:45
	George Sheppard	def.	Josh Bacallao	Decision (Split)	3	5:00
	Jose Figueroa	def.	Joshua Thorpe	Decision (Unanimous)	3	5:00
	Byron Byrd	def.	Sammy Collingwood	TKO (Punches)	1	0:40

== M-1 Fighter: Elimination Round ==
M-1 Fighter: Elimination Round was an event held on August 8, 2010, in Saint Petersburg, Russia.

=== Results ===
Main Card
Weight class				Method	Round	Time	Notes
	Vadim Khaitulov	def.	Vusal Bayramov	Submission (Armbar)	2	2:40
	Evgeni Myakinkin	def.	Igor Kukurudziak	Submission (Armbar)	2	1:15
	Vusal Bayramov	def.	Denis Glukhov	Decision (Unanimous)	2	5:00
	Vadim Khaitulov	def.	Dmitry Godynsky	KO (Punch)	2	0:10

== M-1 Selection Ukraine 2010: Round 3 ==
M-1 Selection Ukraine 2010: Round 3 was an event held on August 10, 2010, at Genova Fortress Hall in Sudak, Crimea, Ukraine.

=== Results ===
Main Card
Weight class				Method	Round	Time	Notes
	Andrei Glushko	def.	Anatoly Bazik	Submission (Rear-Naked Choke)	1	0:00
	Jaroslav Franchuk	def.	Vladimir Oleshkevych	TKO (Doctor Stoppage)	1	0:00
	Amir Gerandokov	def.	Dilyaver Mambetov	Submission (Rear-Naked Choke)	1	2:03
	Vitaly Baryshnikov	def.	Dmitry Karpenko	Submission (Guillotine Choke)	2	0:00
	Alexey Naumov	def.	Salim Kaskulov	Decision (Unanimous)	3	5:00
	Roman Bagin	def.	Sergey Sokha	Submission (Rear-Naked Choke)	1	0:00
	Riza Seydametov	def.	Rostislav Yaroschenko	Submission (Armbar)	1	0:49
	Artyom Egorov	def.	Andrei Balakhonov	Submission (Armbar)	1	0:41
	Islam Edilgeriev	def.	Alexander Dolotenko	TKO (Doctor Stoppage)	2	5:00
	Konstantin Molodanov	def.	Anatoly Safronov	Decision (Unanimous)	3	5:00
	Artem Perehristyuk	def.	Dmitry Tkachenko	Submission (Armbar)	1	0:42

== M-1 Global: Battle on the Neva 4 ==
M-1 Global: Battle on the Neva 4 was an event held on August 19, 2010, at The Flying Dutchman in Saint Petersburg, Russia.

=== Results ===
Main Card
Weight class				Method	Round	Time	Notes
	Denis Goltsov	def.	Igor Kukurudziak	Decision (Unanimous)	3	5:00
	Vyacheslav Vasilevsky	def.	Shamil Tinagadjiev	Decision (Unanimous)	3	5:00
	Magomedrasul Khasbulaev	def.	Kirill Krikunov	Submission (Triangle Choke)	1	2:13
	Ramazan Abdulzhalilov	def.	Hamiz Mamedov	Decision (Unanimous)	3	5:00
	Mikhail Dronov	def.	Davrbek Isakov	TKO (Punches)	1	4:15
	Sergey Faustov	def.	Vugar Bakhshiev	Decision (Unanimous)	3	5:00
	Alexey Nevzorov	def.	Christian Vuapi	Submission (Armbar)	1	4:24
	Mikhail Drinovski	def.	Alex Hakim	TKO (Punches)	1	0:38

== Northwestern League of Combat Sambo: Tournament in Memory of Partisan German ==
Northwestern League of Combat Sambo: Tournament in Memory of Partisan German was an event held on September 11, 2010, in Saint Petersburg, Russia.

=== Results ===
Main Card
Weight class				Method	Round	Time	Notes
	Alexander Kosarev	def.	Stepan Egorov	Submission (Armbar)	1	0:35
	Artur Korchemny	def.	Alexander Grebenkin	Decision (Unanimous)	2	5:00
	Alexander Volabuev	def.	Rustam Abdurapov	Submission (Rear-Naked Choke)	1	4:37
	Sergey Yakovlev	def.	Pavel Nikanorov	Decision (Split)	2	5:00
	Akop Stepanyan	def.	Kazbek Magomedov	TKO (Punches)	1	3:24
	Sergey Yanshin	def.	Christian Vuapi	Submission (Armbar)	1	0:57
	Alexey Efimenko	def.	Alexey Dodonov	Submission (Armbar)	1	1:01

== M-1 Selection 2010: The Americas Finals ==
M-1 Selection 2010: The Americas Finals was an event held on September 18, 2010, at Bally's Atlantic City in Atlantic City, New Jersey, United States.

=== Results ===
Main Card
Weight class				Method	Round	Time	Notes
	Tom Gallicchio	def.	Len Bentley	Submission (Rear-Naked Choke)	1	4:38
	Jose Figueroa	def.	George Sheppard	TKO (Retirement)	2	0:34
	Kenny Garner	def.	Pat Bennett	TKO (Punches)	1	2:31
	Tyson Jeffries	def.	Mike Geurin	Submission (Triangle Choke)	3	3:43
	Mike Winters	def.	Joseph Agostini	Decision (Unanimous)	3	5:00
	Luigi Fioravanti	def.	Woody Weatherby	TKO (Punches)	1	2:51
	Byron Byrd	def.	Daniel Vizcaya	Submission (Triangle Choke)	1	2:43
	Bristol Marunde	def.	Shane Primm	Decision (Unanimous)	3	5:00
	Joshua Thorpe	def.	Brendan Weafer	Decision (Unanimous)	3	5:00

== M-1 Selection Ukraine 2010: Clash of the Titans ==
M-1 Selection Ukraine 2010: Clash of the Titans was an event held on September 18, 2010, at Acco International Exhibition Center in Kyiv, Ukraine.

=== Results ===
Main Card
Weight class				Method	Round	Time	Notes
	Sergey Guzev	def.	Denis Ivanets	Submission (Armbar)	1	1:15
	Rustam Khabilov	def.	Gleb Morozov	Submission (Armbar)	1	4:36
	Khabib Nurmagomedov	def.	Vitaliy Ostrovskiy	TKO (Punches)	1	4:06
	Andrei Prizyuk	def.	Ivan Gladkiy	Submission (Guillotine Choke)	1	2:50
	Vahan Bojukyan	def.	Igor Kukurudziak	Submission (Guillotine Choke)	1	2:30
	Vasily Klepikov	def.	Sergey Sokha	TKO (Punches)	1	1:50
	Pavel Pokatilov	def.	Igor Shpatenko	Submission (Punches)	2	4:05
	Vasily Novikov	def.	Igor Grytskiv	Decision (Unanimous)	2	5:00
	Magomedrasul Khasbulaev	def.	Kirill Krikunov	Submission (Armbar)	1	5:00
	Guram Gugenishvili	def.	Vladimir Gerasimchik	Submission (Neck Crank)	1	0:29
	Roman Bagin	def.	Pavel Snigur	Submission (Armbar)	1	0:41
	Ruslan Khaskhanov	def.	Andrei Balakhonov	Submission (Armbar)	1	0:46
	Artem Grodnik	def.	Renat Lyatifov	Submission (Armbar)	2	1:06
	Sergey Adamchuk	def.	Alexander Zinchenko	Decision (Unanimous)	2	5:00

== M-1 Global: M-1 Ukraine Battle of Lions ==
M-1 Global: M-1 Ukraine Battle of Lions was an event held on October 1, 2010, at Lviv Circus in Lviv, Lviv Oblast, Ukraine.

=== Results ===
Main Card
Weight class				Method	Round	Time	Notes
	Vyacheslav Kostyuk	def.	Igor Kukurudziak	Submission (Armbar)	1	2:43
	Sergey Sokha	def.	Dmitry Batok	Submission (Armbar)	1	1:21
	Islam Mamedov	def.	Sergey Korol	TKO (Punches)	2	3:15
	Magomedrasul Khasbulaev	def.	Sergey Grechka	Submission (Rear-Naked Choke)	1	3:30
	Makasharip Makasharipov	def.	Andrey Tsabal	Decision (Unanimous)	2	5:00

== M-1 Selection Belarus: First Round ==
M-1 Selection Belarus: First Round was an event held on October 17, 2010, in Bobruysk, Mogilev Region, Belarus.

=== Results ===
Main Card
Weight class				Method	Round	Time	Notes
	Dmitry Voitov	def.	Alexander Basariya	Submission (Armbar)	1	0:00
	Denis Gunich	def.	Vitaly Shershevets	Submission (Guillotine Choke)	1	0:00
	Roman Mironenko	def.	Evgeniy Kretsu	Submission (Rear-Naked Choke)	2	0:00
	Viktor Talashov	def.	Alexander Kadelya	Submission (Armbar)	1	0:00
	Alexander Gladky	def.	Dmitriy Vazhnik	Submission (Rear-Naked Choke)	2	0:00
	Artur Yanchenko	def.	Vladimir Gorokhov	Decision (Unanimous)	2	5:00
	Kiril Runets	def.	Alexei Tikhonov	Submission (Heel Hook)	1	0:00
	Sergey Sinkevich	def.	Eduard Pestrak	Submission (Rear-Naked Choke)	1	N/A
	Oleg Syrich	def.	Arnold Vanyan	TKO	0	N/A

== Northwestern League of Combat Sambo: Tournament in Memory of Private Korzun ==
Northwestern League of Combat Sambo: Tournament in Memory of Private Korzun was an event held on October 23, 2010, at Taifun Club in Saint Petersburg, Russia.

=== Results ===
Main Card
Weight class				Method	Round	Time	Notes
	Vladimir Kuchenko	def.	David Gromov	Decision (Unanimous)	2	5:00
	Ilya Doderkin	def.	Alexander Volabuev	Submission (Kneebar)	1	4:37
	Ramazan Esenbaev	def.	Ramz Kurbanov	Decision (Split)	2	5:00
	Alexey Nevzorov	def.	Anton Telepnev	Submission (Ankle Lock)	1	4:50
	Akop Stepanyan	def.	Mikhail Drinovski	Decision (Unanimous)	2	5:00
	Rustam Abdurapov	def.	Dmitriy Terentiev	Submission (Armbar)	1	1:39
	Vugar Bakhshiev	def.	Radzhi Aliev	Submission (Armbar)	1	1:04

== M-1 Selection Ukraine 2010: Round 5 ==
M-1 Selection Ukraine 2010: Round 5 was an event held on October 24, 2010, in Donetsk, Donetsk Oblast, Ukraine.

=== Results ===
Main Card
Weight class				Method	Round	Time	Notes
	Visampasha Mirzakhanov	def.	Sergey Polischyuk	KO (Punch)	1	0:00
	Alexey Smirnov	def.	Dmitry Batok	TKO (Doctor Stoppage)	1	0:00
	Arsen Akopyan	def.	Yuri Gamali	Submission (Guillotine Choke)	1	0:00
	Renat Lyatifov	def.	Pavel Andrutsky	Submission (Armbar)	1	1:43
	Alexander Zinchenko	def.	Eros Iris	Submission (Triangle Choke)	1	0:00
	Vahan Bojukyan	def.	Vitaly Smirnov	Decision (Unanimous)	2	5:00
	Roman Bagin	def.	Vladimir Kryzhanovsky	Submission (Armbar)	1	0:00
	Ruslan Khaskhanov	def.	Abusupiyan Alikhanov	Submission (Armbar)	1	0:00
	Alexander Agafonov	def.	Yuri Sherstyuk	Submission (Armbar)	1	0:00
	Vadim Khaitulov	def.	Anton Blank	Decision (Unanimous)	2	5:00
	Vyacheslav Kostyuk	def.	Anatoly Bazik	TKO (Punches)	1	0:00
	Denis Ivanets	def.	Alexey Lipovoy	TKO (Doctor Stoppage)	1	0:00
	Denis Gunich	def.	Andrei Balabolkin	TKO (Doctor Stoppage)	1	5:00
	Konstantin Molodanov	def.	Vitaliy Ostrovskiy	TKO (Doctor Stoppage)	2	0:00
	Oleg Sirich	def.	Kiril Ivanov	TKO (Punches)	1	0:00

== M-1 Challenge 21: Guram vs. Garner ==
M-1 Challenge 21: Guram vs. Garner was an event held on October 28, 2010, at The Ice Palace Saint Petersburg in Saint Petersburg, Leningrad Oblast, Russia.

=== Results ===
Main Card
Weight class				Method	Round	Time	Notes
	Dmitry Samoilov	def.	Gadzhimurad Omarov	TKO (Doctor Stoppage)	3	0:28
	Alexei Belyaev	def.	Alexei Nazarov	Submission (Guillotine Choke)	2	0:41
	Guram Gugenishvili	def.	Kenny Garner	Technical Submission (Guillotine Choke)	2	0:54
	Artiom Damkovsky	def.	Mairbek Taisumov	TKO (Doctor Stoppage)	3	2:52
	Alexander Sarnavskiy	def.	Victor Kuku	TKO (Spinning Back Fist and Punches)	1	0:14
	Che Mills	def.	Magomed Shikshabekov	Decision (Unanimous)	4	5:00
	Rashid Magomedov	def.	Igor Araujo	Decision (Unanimous)	3	5:00
	Daniel Weichel	def.	Yuri Ivlev	TKO (Doctor Stoppage)	3	2:24
	Mikhail Zayats	def.	Matias Baric	Submission (Rear-Naked Choke)	3	3:12
	Denis Goltsov	def.	Marat Aliaskhabov	Submission (Straight Armbar)	1	4:56
	Vusal Bayramov	def.	Joakhim Apie	TKO (Knees and Punches)	1	2:13

== M-1 Selection Belarus: Quarterfinals ==
M-1 Selection Belarus: Quarterfinals was an event held on November 6, 2010, in Brest, Belarus.

=== Results ===
Main Card
Weight class				Method	Round	Time	Notes
	Roman Silvanovich	def.	Denis Ivanets	Submission (Rear-Naked Choke)	1	3:16
	Pavel Katrunov	def.	Ivan Gromov	Submission (Armbar)	1	1:25
	Boris Miroshnichenko	def.	Alexander Makasy	KO (Punch)	2	3:28
	Roman Mironenko	def.	Alexander Malkoch	Submission (Rear-Naked Choke)	1	4:28
	Vitaliy Ostrovskiy	def.	Evgeni Ciunchik	TKO (Punches)	2	2:35
	Sergey Faley	def.	Sergey Kashpor	Submission (Rear-Naked Choke)	1	0:00
	Ruslan Kolodko	def.	Gleb Morozov	Submission (Rear-Naked Choke)	1	0:33
	Alexander Gladky	def.	Artur Yanchenko	Decision (Unanimous)	3	5:00
	Semen Tyrlya	def.	Sergey Sinkevich	Decision (Unanimous)	3	5:00
	Zamin Guseinov	def.	Ivan Gladkiy	TKO (Punches)	1	1:36
	Semen Selyukov	def.	Vitaly Lazovski	Submission (Armbar)	3	0:35
	Arnold Vanyan	def.	Pavel Golenkov	Submission (Rear-Naked Choke)	1	0:00

== M-1 Selection Ukraine 2010: Round 6 ==
M-1 Selection Ukraine 2010: Round 6 was an event held on November 6, 2010, at The Acco International Exhibition Center in Kyiv, Ukraine.

=== Results ===
Main Card
Weight class				Method	Round	Time	Notes
	Yuri Ogirya	def.	Yaroslav Kochubinsky	Submission (Rear-Naked Choke)	1	0:00
	Visampasha Mirzakhanov	def.	Ruslan Chapko	TKO (Retirement)	2	1:49
	Magomed Magomedkerimov	def.	Viktor Kuzmenko	Submission (Rear-Naked Choke)	1	1:25
	Anatoly Safronov	def.	Maxim Palyi	Submission (Rear-Naked Choke)	1	0:51
	Marat Gafurov	def.	Yuri Vlasenko	Submission (Rear-Naked Choke)	1	1:18
	Arsen Akopyan	def.	Besik Gobedzhashvili	Submission (Heel Hook)	1	4:28
	Tengiz Khuchua	def.	Yuri Gamali	Submission (Rear-Naked Choke)	1	1:52
	Alexander Romaschenko	def.	Renat Muslyadinov	TKO (Doctor Stoppage)	1	0:00
	Sergey Guzev	def.	Andrei Embolaev	Submission (Rear-Naked Choke)	1	2:13
	Rustam Khabilov	def.	Sergei Utochkin	Submission (Armbar)	1	1:28
	Magomedrasul Khasbulaev	def.	Jaroslav Franchuk	TKO (Punches)	1	4:47
	Evgeni Khavilov	def.	Serhiy Adamchuk	Decision (Unanimous)	3	5:00
	Dzhambuli Tsotadze	def.	Islam Edilgeriev	TKO (Corner Stoppage)	2	4:00
	Andrei Prizyuk	def.	Artem Grodnik	Submission (Rear-Naked Choke)	1	4:48

== M-1 Ukraine: Battle of Champions ==
M-1 Ukraine: Battle of Champions was an event held on November 26, 2010, at Simferopol Circus in Simferopol, Crimea, Ukraine.

=== Results ===
Main Card
Weight class				Method	Round	Time	Notes
	Maxim Mazenko	def.	Vasiliy Kutsiy	Submission (Guillotine Choke)	1	0:35
	Stanislav Tkachenko	def.	Vitaliy Koval	KO (Punch)	1	0:15
	Dilyaver Mambetov	def.	Anton Volovenko	Submission (Rear-Naked Choke)	1	3:39
	Alexander Voitenko	def.	Pavel Zhukov	Submission (Armbar)	1	1:04
	Andrei Prizyuk	def.	Amir Gerandokov	KO (Punch)	1	1:49
	Alyona Rassohyna	def.	Olga Denisenko	Decision (Unanimous)	2	5:00
	Andrei Brovko	def.	Vyacheslav Kostyuk	Submission (Rear-Naked Choke)	1	2:43
	Pavel Snigur	def.	Alexey Tsukanov	Submission (Armbar)	1	1:30
	Vladimir Katyhin	def.	Andrei Balabolkin	Decision (Unanimous)	2	5:00
	Alkhas Mukba	def.	Andrei Balakhonov	Submission (Armbar)	1	3:26
	Dmitriy Kozhukovsky	def.	Ruslan Chapko	Decision (Unanimous)	2	5:00
	Alexei Maksimchuk	def.	Igor Chaplygin	Decision (Unanimous)	2	5:00

== M-1 Challenge 22: Narkun vs. Vasilevsky ==
M-1 Challenge 22: Narkun vs. Vasilevsky was an event held on December 10, 2010, at Druzhba Arena in Moscow, Russia.

=== Results ===
Main Card
Weight class				Method	Round	Time	Notes
	Viktor Nemkov	def.	Daniel Vizcaya	Submission (Triangle Choke)	1	1:09
	Mikhail Zayats	def.	David Tkeshelashvili	Submission (Rear-Naked Choke)	1	2:26
	Luigi Fioravanti	def.	Artur Guseinov	Submission (Rear-Naked Choke)	4	0:33
	Vyacheslav Vasilevsky	def.	Tomasz Narkun	TKO (Retirement)	2	2:20
	Rafal Moks	def.	Magomed Sultanakhmedov	Submission (Heel Hook)	1	0:17
	Shamil Zavurov	def.	Abner Lloveras	TKO (Punches)	4	4:22
	Pat Bennett	def.	Alexander Volkov	Decision (Unanimous)	4	5:00
	Vinny Magalhaes	def.	Alikhan Magomedov	Submission (Triangle Armbar)	2	1:10
	Alexander Sarnavskiy	def.	Arsen Ubaidulaev	Submission (Rear-Naked Choke)	1	0:43
	Yana Kunitskaya	def.	Cindy Dandois	TKO (Punches)	1	0:34
	Vitaly Minakov	def.	Valeriy Shcherbakov	Submission (Armbar)	1	1:05
	Alexander Tokarev	def.	Vusal Bayramov	KO (Punch)	1	1:47

== Northwestern League of Combat Sambo: Tournament in Memory of Marshal Govorov ==
Northwestern League of Combat Sambo: Tournament in Memory of Marshal Govorov was an event held on December 25, 2010, at Taifun Club in Saint Petersburg, Russia.

=== Results ===
Main Card
Weight class				Method	Round	Time	Notes
	Alexander Salimon	vs.	Dmitriy Alferiev	Draw	3	5:00
	Murad Chachanov	def.	Mikhail Mokhnatkin	Submission (Rear-Naked Choke)	1	1:20
	Mikhail Akhrestin	def.	Alexander Volabuev	Submission (Kneebar)	1	1:59
	Anatoly Tokov	def.	Rustam Abdurapov	Submission (Armbar)	2	0:40
	Vugar Bakhshiev	def.	Ruslan Tarin	Submission (Armbar)	1	0:42
	Robert Okreashvili	def.	Vitaliy Umnikh	TKO (Punches)	1	1:40

== M-1 Selection Belarus: Finals ==
M-1 Selection Belarus: Finals was an event held on December 25, 2010, at The Minsk Sports Hall in Minsk, Belarus.

=== Results ===
Main Card
Weight class				Method	Round	Time	Notes
	Yuriy Snegovskoy	def.	Dmitriy Dennischik	Submission (Rear-Naked Choke)	2	1:07
	Roman Silvanovich	def.	Sergei Radko	TKO (Retirement)	3	2:13
	Roman Mironenko	def.	Boris Miroshnichenko	Submission (Rear-Naked Choke)	2	4:37
	Sergey Faley	def.	Vitaly Lazovski	Decision (Unanimous)	2	5:00
	Semen Tyrlya	def.	Sergey Sinkevich	Decision (Unanimous)	2	5:00
	Vitaly Lazovski	def.	Viktor Talashov	Decision (Unanimous)	2	5:00
	Sergey Faley	def.	Gleb Morozov	Decision (Unanimous)	2	5:00
	Sergey Sinkevich	def.	Alexander Gladky	Decision (Unanimous)	2	5:00
	Semen Tyrlya	def.	Pavel Mikhaylov	Decision (Unanimous)	2	5:00

== See also ==
- M-1 Global
