= Vitaly Minakov =

Russian sambist, judoka and mixed martial artist

Vitaly Minakov Виталий Минаков
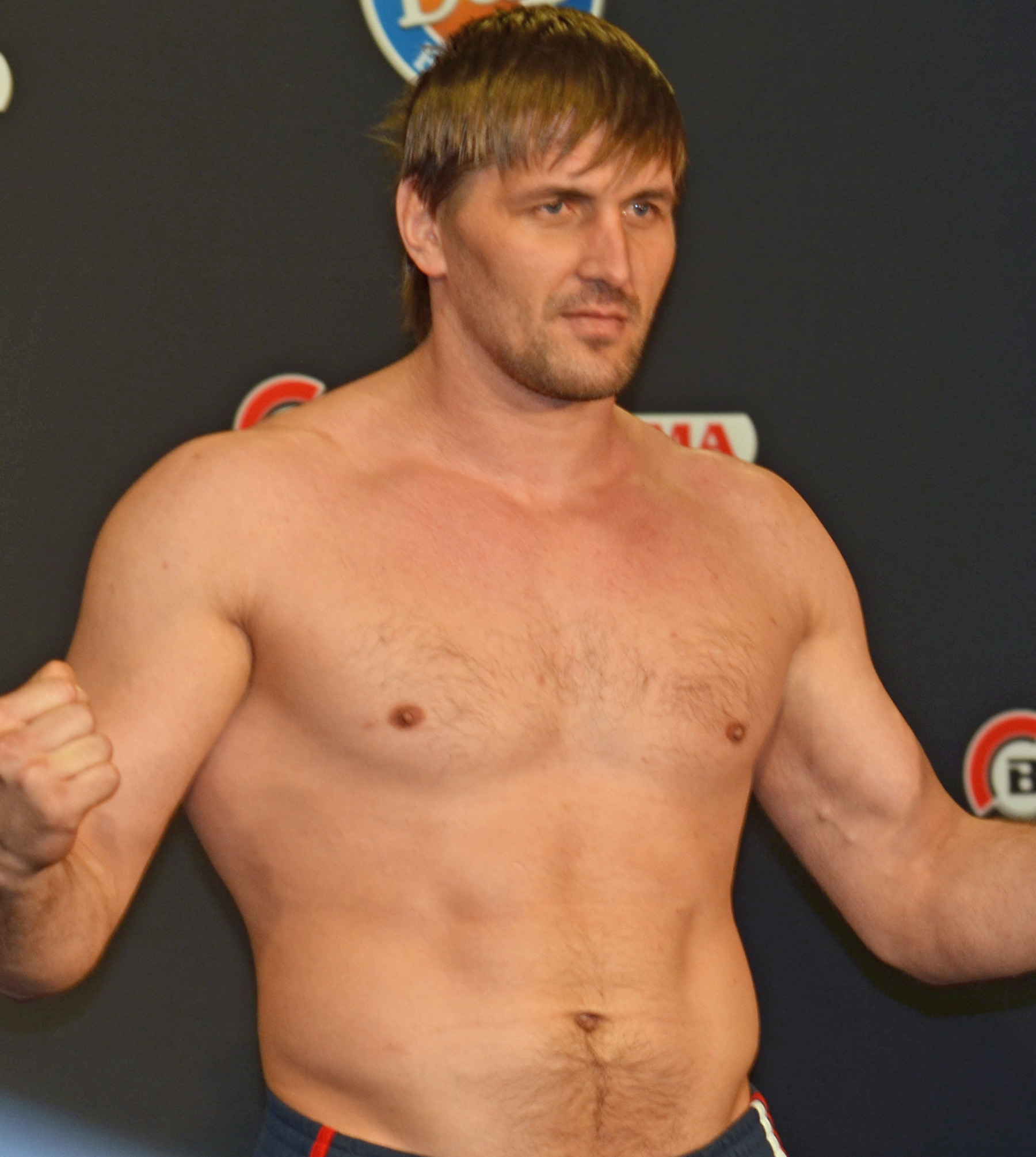
- Born: Vitaly Viktorovich Minakov; February 6, 1985 (age 41); Bryansk, Russian SFSR, Soviet Union
- Nationality: Russian
- Height: 6 ft 2 in (1.88 m)
- Weight: 265 lb (120 kg; 18.9 st)
- Division: Heavyweight (265 lb)
- Reach: 78 in (198 cm)
- Style: Sambo
- Stance: Orthodox
- Fighting out of: Bryansk, Russia
- Team: Eagles MMA; Fight Nights Team
- Rank: 1st Razryad Grand Master in Sambo; Black belt in Judo; Master of Sports in Freestyle Wrestling
- Years active: 2010–2021

Mixed martial arts record
- Total: 24
- Wins: 22
- By knockout: 13
- By submission: 7
- By decision: 2
- Losses: 2
- By knockout: 1
- By decision: 1

Other information
- Mixed martial arts record from Sherdog

Vitaly Viktorovich Minakov (Russian: Виталий Викторович Минаков; born February 6, 1985) is a Russian mixed martial artist, sambist and judoka who competed in the heavyweight division. A professional competitor from 2010 till 2021, he competed for Bellator MMA, where he is the former Bellator MMA Heavyweight World Champion, M-1 Global and Fight Nights Global.

== Mixed martial arts career ==
=== MMA career ===
Minakov made his professional MMA debut in November 2010. He is a Sambo World Champion, (2008–2011).

Minakov defeated UFC and Bellator veteran Eddie Sanchez on June 7, 2012 at Fight Nights - Battle of Moscow 7. He won via KO in the first round.

Minakov defeated Brazilian Jiu-Jitsu World Champion and UFC veteran Fabiano Scherner on September 17, 2012 at Fight Nights - Battle of Desne. He won via KO in the first round.

=== Bellator MMA ===
In June 2012, Minakov was signed in Bellator.

He made his debut the following fall at Bellator 79 on November 2, 2012. He defeated a Moldavian National Champion & Judo Black Belt Vladimir Starcencov via TKO in the second round to win his Bellator and North American debut.

Minakov faced Ron Sparks on June 19, 2013 in the Bellator Heavyweight Tournament Semifinal. He won in the first round by technical knockout.

Minakov faced Ryan Martinez at Bellator 97 in the finals on July 31, 2013. He got the TKO victory via punches in the third round, after he took Martinez down and secured full mount.

Minakov faced and defeated Alexander Volkov on November 15, 2013 at Bellator 108 to win the Bellator Heavyweight Championship.

Minakov faced Bellator Season 9 Heavyweight Tournament winner Cheick Kongo at Bellator 115 on April 4, 2014. He won via unanimous decision to retain the Bellator Heavyweight Championship.

Minakov was stripped of his Bellator MMA title on May 14, 2016 due to inactivity.

=== Post-Bellator ===
After leaving Bellator MMA, Minakov returned to fight in his native Russia, under Fight Nights Global promotion. He fought seven times since July 2015 and won all seven of his bouts by finishes.

=== Return to Bellator ===
On August 23, 2018 it was revealed that Minakov and his management team had reconciled with Bellator and reached an agreement for a new contract. The new contract was for six bouts at $300,000 per fight, with his win bonuses applied on top of that fee.

On January 16, 2019, RusFighters LLC, Minakov's agent and manager, filed a lawsuit in the Orange County Superior Court against Minakov and Ali Abdelaziz, claiming Minakov breached the agreement with RusFighters when he used Abdelaziz to sign the new contract with Bellator. On February 28, 2020, the courts agreed that RusFighters LLC is owed 20% of any gross performance compensation of any bout during the term of his six-bout Bellator contract.

In his return, Minakov faced Cheick Kongo in a rematch at Bellator 216 on February 16, 2019. He lost the fight via unanimous decision, marking his first professional loss in MMA.

Minakov was to face Javy Ayala at Bellator 225 on August 24, 2019. However, on the day of the fight, it was announced that Ayala was pulled from the bout due to undisclosed medical reasons. Minakov instead faced Tim Johnson. Minakov won the bout via first round knockout.

Minakov was rescheduled to meet Ayala at Bellator 232 on October 26, 2019. However, Minakov was unable to obtain visa for the bout, leading to Ayala being pulled from the card also.

Minakov was scheduled to face Tyrell Fortune on October 23, 2021 at Bellator 269. However in August, it was announced that Fortune pulled out for unknown reasons and was replaced by Said Sowma. He lost the bout after it was stopped due to a broken finger.

== Championships and accomplishments ==
=== Martial arts ===
- Bellator MMA
  - Bellator Heavyweight World Championship (One time)
  - One Successful Title Defense.
  - Bellator 2013 Summer Series Heavyweight Tournament Championship.
  - Tied (with Tyrell Fortune) for most knockout victories in Bellator Heavyweight division (five)
- Fight Nights Global
  - Undefeated in Fight Nights (9-0)
- Global-MMA
  - Global-MMA Fighter of the Year 2013.

=== Sambo ===
- Fédération Internationale de Sambo (FIAS)
  - Sambo World Champion (4 time)
  - Russian National Champion (4 time)
  - Russian Presidential Cup Sambo Champion (3 time - 2008, 2009, 2010)

=== Judo ===
- Russian Judo Federation
  - 2006 Russian U23 Championships: 1st place
  - 2005 Russian U23 Championships: 3rd place
  - 2004 Russian U20 Championships: 2nd place

== Mixed martial arts record ==
Professional record breakdown
24 matches	22 wins	2 losses
By knockout	13	1
By submission	7	0
By decision	2	1

Res.	Record	Opponent	Method	Event	Date	Round	Time	Location	Notes
Loss	22–2	Said Sowma	TKO (finger injury)	Bellator 269	October 23, 2021	3	3:08	Moscow, Russia	
Win	22–1	Timothy Johnson	KO (punches)	Bellator 225	August 24, 2019	1	1:45	Bridgeport, Connecticut, United States	
Loss	21–1	Cheick Kongo	Decision (unanimous)	Bellator 216	February 16, 2019	3	5:00	Uncasville, Connecticut, United States	
Win	21–0	Tony Johnson	TKO (punches)	Fight Nights Global 82: Minakov vs. Johnson	December 16, 2017	2	0:38	Moscow, Moscow Oblast, Russia	
Win	20–0	Antônio Silva	KO (punches)	Fight Nights Global 68: Pavlovich vs. Mokhnatkin	June 2, 2017	2	1:37	St. Petersburg, Leningrad oblast, Russia	
Win	19–0	DJ Linderman	KO (punches)	Fight Nights Global 59: Minakov vs. Linderman	February 23, 2017	3	3:09	Khimki, Moscow Oblast, Russia	
Win	18–0	Peter Graham	Submission (armbar)	Fight Nights Global 50: Fedor vs. Maldonado	June 17, 2016	1	1:01	St. Petersburg, Leningrad oblast, Russia	
Win	17–0	Josh Copeland	Submission (kimura)	Fight Nights: Battle of Moscow 20	December 11, 2015	2	2:50	Moscow, Moscow oblast, Russia	
Win	16–0	Geronimo dos Santos	Submission (armbar)	Fight Nights Global: Dagestan	September 25, 2015	1	3:14	Kaspiysk, Dagestan, Russia	Openweight bout.
Win	15–0	Adam Maciejewski	TKO (punches)	Fight Nights Global: Sochi	July 31, 2015	1	0:20	Sochi, Krasnodar krai, Russia	
Win	14–0	Cheick Kongo	Decision (unanimous)	Bellator 115	April 4, 2014	5	5:00	Reno, Nevada, United States	Defended the Bellator Heavyweight World Championship. Later stripped of the championship following a contract dispute.
Win	13–0	Alexander Volkov	TKO (punches)	Bellator 108	November 15, 2013	1	2:57	Atlantic City, New Jersey, United States	Won the Bellator Heavyweight World Championship.
Win	12–0	Ryan Martinez	TKO (punches)	Bellator 97	July 31, 2013	3	4:02	Rio Rancho, New Mexico, United States	
Win	11–0	Ron Sparks	KO (punches)	Bellator 96	June 19, 2013	1	0:32	Thackerville, Oklahoma, United States	
Win	10–0	Vladimir Starcencov	TKO (punches)	Bellator 79	November 2, 2012	2	0:27	Rama, Ontario, Canada	
Win	9–0	Fabiano Scherner	TKO (punches)	Fight Nights: Battle of Desne	September 17, 2012	1	3:51	Bryansk, Bryansk Oblast, Russia	
Win	8–0	Eddie Sanchez	KO (punch)	Fight Nights: Battle of Moscow 7	June 7, 2012	1	1:59	Moscow, Moscow Oblast, Russia	
Win	7–0	Karol Celinski	TKO (corner stoppage)	Faxe Forward Challenge 2: Russia vs. Latvia	April 14, 2012	1	0:55	Riga, Vidzeme, Latvia	
Win	6–0	Ivan Frolov	Submission (guillotine choke)	AntMMA: Ultimate Fighting of Bryansk	June 29, 2011	1	0:45	Bryansk, Bryansk Oblast, Russia	
Win	5–0	Juan Espino	TKO (punches)	League S-70: Sambo 70 vs. Spain	April 21, 2011	1	0:09	Moscow, Russia	
Win	4–0	Valery Scherbakov	Submission (armbar)	M-1 Challenge 22: Narkun vs. Vasilevsky	December 10, 2010	1	1:05	Moscow, Moscow Oblast, Russia	
Win	3–0	Vitalii Yalovenko	Decision (unanimous)	M-1 Selection 2010: Eastern Europe Finals	July 22, 2010	3	5:00	Moscow, Moscow Oblast, Russia	
Win	2–0	Alexander Zubachov	Submission (rear-naked choke)	Sambo-70/M-1 Global: Sochi Open European Championships	July 14, 2010	1	0:27	Sochi, Krasnodar Krai, Russia	
Win	1–0	Ruslan Kabdulin	Submission (armbar)	M-1 Selection 2010: Eastern Europe Round 2	April 10, 2010	1	4:19	Kyiv, Kyiv Oblast, Ukraine	

== See also ==
- List of Bellator MMA alumni
- List of male mixed martial artists
- List of multi-sport athletes
- List of multi-sport champions
