= Tomasz Narkun =

Polish mixed martial arts fighter

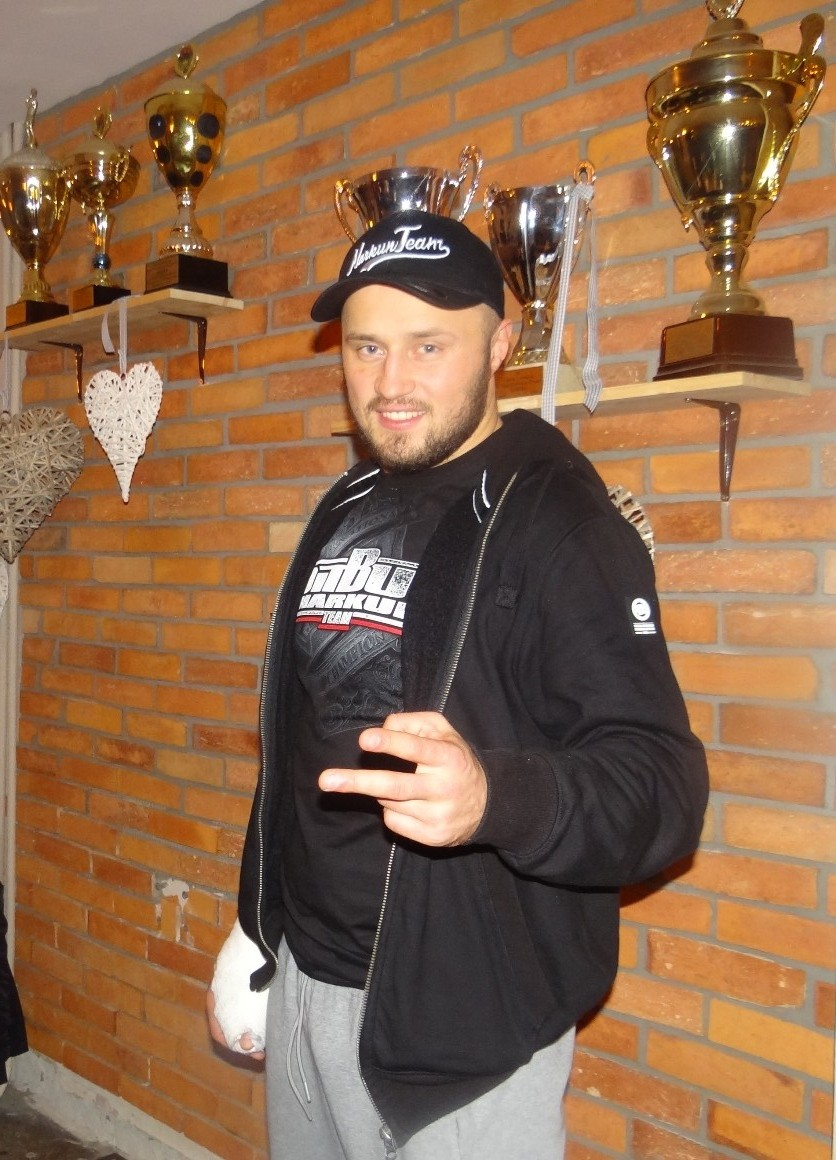
- Born: Tomasz Narkun; December 3, 1989 (age 36); Stargard, Poland
- Other names: Zyrafa ("Giraffe")
- Nationality: Polish
- Height: 6 ft 3 in (191 cm)
- Weight: 224 lb (102 kg; 16 st 0 lb)
- Division: Heavyweight; Light Heavyweight
- Reach: 76.8 in (195 cm)
- Stance: Orthodox
- Fighting out of: Stargard Szczeciński, Poland
- Team: Berserkers Team
- Rank: Black belt in Brazilian Jiu-Jitsu under Piotr Bagiński
- Years active: 2009–2011, 2013–present

Mixed martial arts record
- Total: 29
- Wins: 22
- By knockout: 5
- By submission: 16
- By decision: 1
- Losses: 7
- By knockout: 3
- By decision: 4

Other information
- Mixed martial arts record from Sherdog

Tomasz "Giraffe" Narkun (born December 3, 1989) is a Polish mixed martial artist currently competing for KSW. A professional MMA competitor since 2009, he is the former KSW Light Heavyweight Champion and has also competed for M-1 Global, where he is the former Light Heavyweight Champion.

== Background ==
Weighing in at around 205 lb (93 kg; 14.6 st), Narkun is considered small by North American standards for light heavyweights. He has, however, earned respect for his tactical and defensive capabilities. Gegard "Dreamcatcher" Mousasi, a regular training partner of Narkun, has said of Narkun: "Tactically and technically he has reached a very high level". Mousasi has also stated his belief that Narkun "is the future light heavyweight champion".

== Career ==
=== Early career ===
Narkun made his professional MMA debut in 2009, winning via armbar submission in the first round.

=== M-1 Global ===
In 2010 Narkun appeared for M-1 Global at their Western Europe Selections Light Heavyweight Tournament in 2010. Narkun won his first two bouts with relative ease; submitting each opponent within a minute of the first round. In the Tournament Final in July, Narkun faced Georgian David Tkeshelashvili, winning again via first-round submission. This also awarded Narkun the M-1 Global Light Heavyweight Championship belt.

Narkun next faced Vyacheslav Vasilevsky in his first title defense on December 10, 2010. Narkun was handed his first professional loss via second-round TKO after Narkun's corner threw in the towel.

At the weigh-ins for M-1 Challenge 28 in Russia, for his fight against Saparbek Safarov, both fighters ended up slapping each other. At first it appeared to be a joke, but when Safarov threw a right hook at Narkun, M-1 officials intervened. Safarov was disqualified from the event.

Narkun fought only once in 2011; winning via first-round submission; this would be his last fight under the M-1 Global banner. After not returning to the cage until 2013, Narkun won his next three fights via submission before signing with KSW in his native Poland.

=== KSW ===
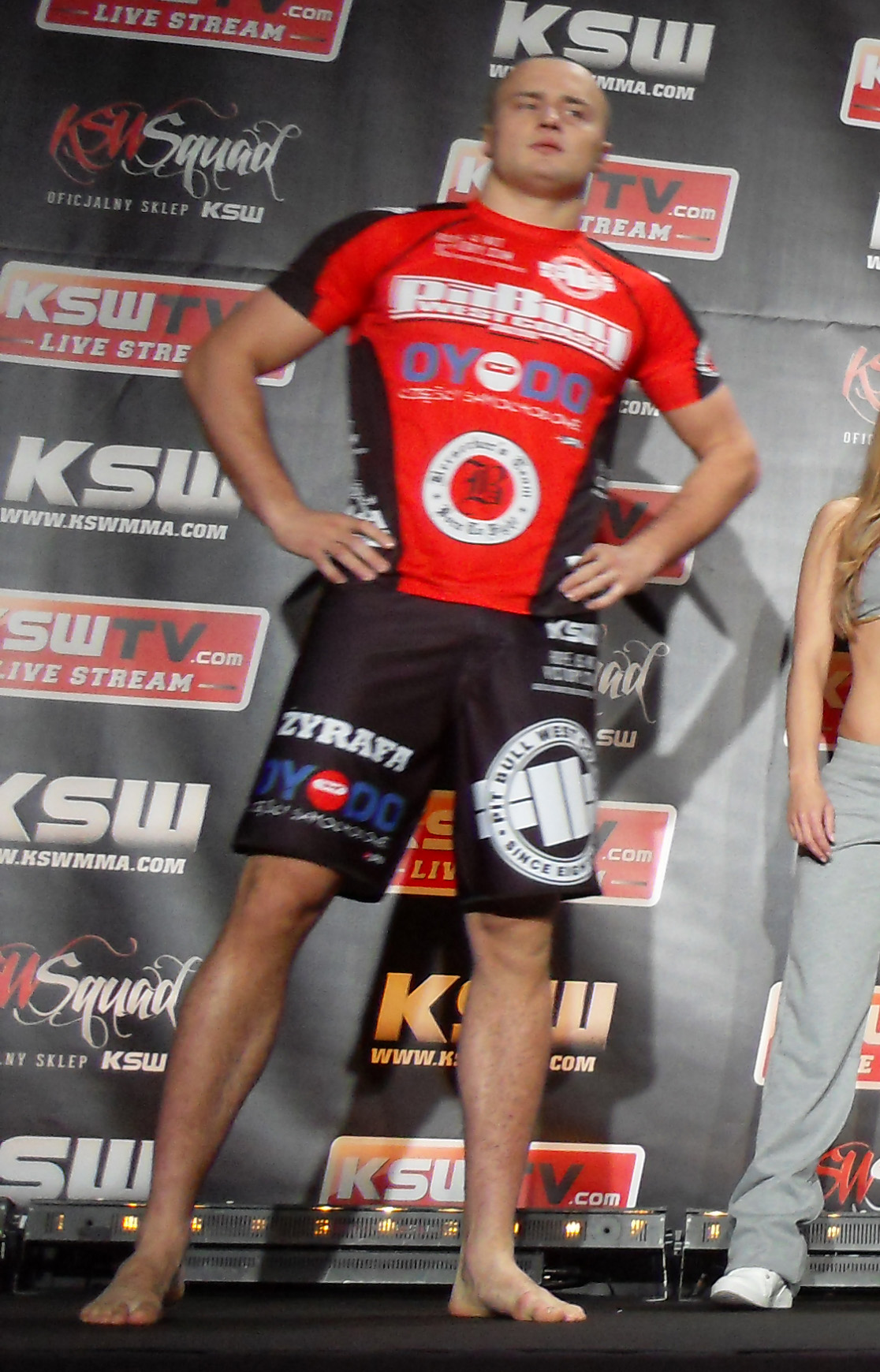
Narkun during the official weigh-in before KSW 27 (May 16, 2014)

Narkun made his promotional debut against Brazilian veteran Charles Andrade at KSW 27 on May 17, 2014. He won via kneebar submission in the first round.

==== KSW Light Heavyweight Champion ====
Narkun returned to face Croatian Goran Reljić at KSW 29. Narkun was defeated via majority decision. In 2015, Narkun defeated Karol Celinski via first-round rear-naked choke before being given a rematch with Reljic, who had since defeated Attila Végh to become KSW Light Heavyweight Champion, at KSW 32. Narkun won via first-round knockout, becoming the KSW Light Heavyweight Champion.

After defeating Reljic in their rematch for the belt, Narkun had his first title defense against Brazilian Cassio "Jacare" de Oliveira at KSW 34 in early 2016, and then defeated Sokoudjou for his second defense in October of that year. For his third defense, Narkun defeated Marcin Wójcik via triangle choke with just a second left in the first round at KSW 39: Colosseum.

At KSW 42, Narkun prepared for a non-title bout against Mamed Khalidov, the former KSW Middleweight Champion. The pair met at a Catchweight of 203 lbs. After getting knocked down twice in the first round, Narkun was able to regroup, he won via triangle choke submission in the third round; breaking Khalidov's 15-fight unbeaten streak. The pair met again at KSW 46 on December 1, 2018. Narkun won again, this time via unanimous decision after three rounds.

Narkun next challenged KSW Heavyweight Champion and former UFC veteran Phil De Fries for his title at KSW 47 on March 23, 2019. Narkun lost via unanimous decision.

Narkun next defended his Light Heavyweight Championship at KSW 50: London against Przemysław Mysiala, winning via guillotine choke submission in the first round.

Narkun faced Ivan Erslan at KSW 56: Polska vs. Chorwacja on November 14, 2020. He defended his title, winning the fight via second round submission.

Narkun rematched Phil De Fries on April 24, 2021, at KSW 60: De Fries vs. Narkun 2 for the KSW Heavyweight Championship. The pair previously met on March 23, 2019, in the main event at KSW 47: The X-Warriors, where De Fries defeated Narkun by unanimous decision and defended his KSW heavyweight title. He lost the bout in the second round via ground and pound.

Narkun faced Ibragim Chuzhigaev on January 15, 2022, at KSW 66: Ziółkowski vs. Mańkowski. Narkun lost via unanimous decision, ending his reign as the Light Heavyweight champion.

==== Post Title Reign ====
In his first appearance after losing the belt, Narkun faced Henrique da Silva on October 14, 2022, at KSW 75: Ruchała vs. Stasiak. After dominating on the ground in the first round, Narkun was knocked out via a front kick 28 seconds into the second round.

== Championships and accomplishments ==
=== Mixed martial arts ===
- Konfrontacja Sztuk Walki
  - KSW Light Heavyweight Championship (One time)
    - Five Successful Title Defenses
  - Fight of the Night (Two times) vs. Mamed Khalidov and Ibragim Chuzhigaev
  - Submission of the Night (One times) vs. Przemyslaw Mysiala (KSW 50)
- European MMA
  - EUMMA Light Heavyweight Championship (One time)
- M-1 Global
  - 2010 M-1 Global Western Europe Selection Tournament Winner
- Super League of MMA
  - Fight of the Night (One time)
  - Submission of the Night (One time)

=== Grappling ===
- 2012: ADCC European Championship - 1st place in 99 kg category (Ljubljana)
- 2014: ADCC European Championship - 1st place in 99 kg category (Sofia)

== Mixed martial arts record ==
Professional record breakdown
29 matches	22 wins	7 losses
By knockout	5	3
By submission	16	0
By decision	1	4

Res.	Record	Opponent	Method	Event	Date	Round	Time	Location	Notes
Win	22–7	Daniel Škvor	Submission (rear-naked choke)	Oktagon 95	October 17, 2026	1	2:29	Karlovy Vary, Czech Republic	
Loss	21–7	Alexander Poppeck	Decision (unanimous)	Oktagon 86	April 11, 2026	3	5:00	Szczecin, Poland	
Win	21–6	Arkadiusz Jędraczka	TKO (elbows)	Seaside BattleS MMA 5	May 11, 2024	1	1:26	Szczecin, Poland	
Win	20–6	Jussi Halonen	Submission (triangle choke)	Seaside BattleS MMA 4	December 1, 2023	1	0:30	Płoty, Poland	
Win	19–6	Antonio Zovak	TKO (punches)	Seaside BattleS MMA 3	June 7, 2023	1	0:16	Szczecin, Poland	
Loss	18–6	Henrique da Silva	KO (front kick)	KSW 75	October 14, 2022	2	0:28	Nowy Sącz, Poland	
Loss	18–5	Ibragim Chuzhigaev	Decision (unanimous)	KSW 66	January 15, 2022	5	5:00	Szczecin, Poland	Lost the KSW Light Heavyweight Championship. Fight of the Night.
Loss	18–4	Phil De Fries	TKO (punches)	KSW 60	April 24, 2021	2	3:37	Łódź, Poland	For the KSW Heavyweight Championship.
Win	18–3	Ivan Erslan	Submission (rear-naked choke)	KSW 56	November 14, 2020	2	0:51	Łódź, Poland	Defended the KSW Light Heavyweight Championship.
Win	17–3	Przemysław Mysiala	Submission (guillotine choke)	KSW 50	September 14, 2019	1	4:03	London, England	Defended the KSW Light Heavyweight Championship. Submission of the Night.
Loss	16–3	Phil De Fries	Decision (unanimous)	KSW 47	March 23, 2019	5	5:00	Łódź, Poland	Heavyweight debut. For the KSW Heavyweight Championship.
Win	16–2	Mamed Khalidov	Decision (unanimous)	KSW 46	December 1, 2018	3	5:00	Gliwice, Poland	Catchweight (203 lb) bout. Fight of the Night.
Win	15–2	Mamed Khalidov	Submission (triangle choke)	KSW 42	March 3, 2018	3	1:18	Łódź, Poland	Catchweight (203 lb) bout. Submission of the Night. Fight of the Night.
Win	14–2	Marcin Wójcik	Submission (triangle choke)	KSW 39	May 27, 2017	1	4:59	Warsaw, Poland	Defended the KSW Light Heavyweight Championship.
Win	13–2	Rameau Thierry Sokoudjou	TKO (punches)	KSW 36	October 1, 2016	1	4:38	Zielona Góra, Poland	Defended the KSW Light Heavyweight Championship.
Win	12–2	Cássio Barbosa de Oliveira	TKO (knee and punches)	KSW 34	March 5, 2016	1	1:46	Warsaw, Poland	Defended the KSW Light Heavyweight Championship. Knockout of the Night.
Win	11–2	Goran Reljić	KO (punches)	KSW 32	October 31, 2015	1	1:55	London, England	Won the KSW Light Heavyweight Championship.
Win	10–2	Karol Celiński	Submission (rear-naked choke)	KSW 31	May 23, 2015	1	2:17	Gdańsk, Poland	Submission of the Night.
Loss	9–2	Goran Reljić	Decision (majority)	KSW 29	December 6, 2014	3	5:00	Kraków, Poland	
Win	9–1	Charles Andrade	Submission (kneebar)	KSW 27	May 17, 2014	1	1:02	Gdańsk, Poland	
Win	8–1	Simon Carlsen	Submission (armbar)	European MMA 7	November 7, 2013	2	3:30	Aarhus, Denmark	Won the EMMA Light Heavyweight Championship.
Win	7–1	Michal Gutowski	Submission (rear-naked choke)	XCage: Extreme Cage 5	May 17, 2013	2	3:30	Toruń, Poland	
Win	6–1	Rafal Zawidzki	Submission (guillotine choke)	Super League Mixed Martial Arts	April 18, 2013	1	3:45	Warsaw, Poland	
Win	5–1	Shamil Tinagadjiev	Submission (triangle choke)	M-1 Challenge 23	March 5, 2011	1	3:33	Moscow, Russia	
Loss	4–1	Vyacheslav Vasilevsky	TKO (retirement)	M-1 Challenge 22	December 10, 2010	2	2:20	Moscow, Russia	For the inaugural M-1 Global Light Heavyweight Championship.
Win	4–0	David Tkeshelashvili	Submission (rear-naked choke)	M-1: Europe Selection 2010 (Stage 8)	July 22, 2010	1	1:50	Moscow, Russia	Won the 2010 M-1 Western Europe Selection Light Heavyweight Tournament.
Win	3–0	Timo Karttunen	Submission (triangle armbar)	M-1: European Selection 2010 (Stage 7)	May 29, 2010	1	0:49	Helsinki, Finland	2010 M-1 Western Europe Selection Light Heavyweight Tournament Semifinal.
Win	2–0	Olutobi Ayodeji Kalejaiye	Submission (rear-naked choke)	M-1: European Selection 2010 (Stage 3)	March 27, 2010	1	0:52	Weesp, Netherlands	2010 M-1 Western Europe Selection Light Heavyweight Tournament Quarterfinal.
Win	1–0	Daniel Biskupic	Submission (armbar)	Fight Club Berlin 14	November 15, 2009	1	N/A	Berlin, Germany	Light Heavyweight debut.

== See also ==
- List of current KSW fighters
- List of male mixed martial artists
