= Venues of the 2014 Winter Olympics and Paralympics =

The 2014 Winter Olympics and Paralympics venues are divided between two "clusters" located in and around Sochi, Russia.

== Venues ==
=== Coastal Cluster ===
Located in the Adler City District of Sochi, Imeretinsky Valley, on the Black Sea, the Olympic Park houses the main Olympic Stadium used for the Games' ceremonies, and venues for indoor sports such as hockey, figure skating, curling, and speed skating. It also houses training facilities, the Olympic Village, the international broadcasting centre, and other amenities. The park is designed so that all of the venues are accessible within walking distance of each other. The venues are situated around a water basin containing a fountain known as "The Waters of the Olympic Park"; designed by California-based WET (which also designed the cauldron for the 2002 Winter Olympics in Salt Lake City), the fountain measures 5.3 meters in diameter with a capacity of about 700,000 gallons of water, featuring more than 250 nozzles and jet systems that can create fog and choreographed water displays set to music.

Coastal Cluster concept with all venues gathered around the Medals Plaza

Venue	Coordinates	Sports		Capacity	Ref.
Venue	Coordinates	Olympics	Paralympics	Capacity	Ref.
Bolshoy Ice Dome	43°24′16″N 39°57′00″E	Hockey (final)	-	12,000	
Fisht Olympic Stadium	43°24′08″N 39°57′22″E	Ceremonies (opening/ closing)	Ceremonies (opening/ closing)	40,000	
Shayba Arena	43°24′08″N 39°57′07″E	Hockey	Ice sledge hockey	7,000	
Ice Cube Curling Center	43°24′24.48″N 39°56′58.54″E	Curling	Wheelchair Curling	3,000	
Adler Arena Skating Center	43°24′31″N 39°57′10″E	Speed skating	-	8,000	
Iceberg Skating Palace	43°24′27″N 39°57′30″E	Figure skating. Short track speed skating	-	12,000	
Sochi Medals Plaza	43°24′20″N 39°57′17″E	Victory ceremonies	-		

=== Mountain Cluster ===
2014 Winter Olympics Mountain Cluster Venues

Venue	Coordinates	Sports		Capacity	Ref.
Venue	Coordinates	Olympics	Paralympics	Capacity	Ref.
Laura Biathlon & Ski Complex	43°41′32″N 40°19′29″E	Biathlon, Cross-country skiing, Nordic combined (cross-country skiing)	Biathlon, Cross-country skiing	7,500	
Rosa Khutor Extreme Park	43°39′27″N 40°19′11″E	Freestyle skiing, Snowboarding	Snowboarding	4,000 (freestyle); 6,250 (snowboard)	
Rosa Khutor Alpine Resort	43°38′47″N 40°19′56″E	Alpine skiing	Alpine skiing	7,500	
RusSki Gorki Jumping Center	43°40′33″N 40°14′28″E	Nordic combined (ski jumping), Ski jumping	-	7,500	
Sliding Center Sanki	43°40′01″N 40°17′19″E	Bobsleigh, Luge, Skeleton	-	5,000	

=== The Olympic Village ===
The Sochi 2014 Olympic Village was a comprehensive setup, consisting of three distinct "villages" designed to accommodate athletes and delegates for the Winter Olympics: Usadba Coastal Olympic Village in the coastal cluster, Mountain Olympic Village and Sloboda Endurance Village in the mountain cluster.

The Usadba Coastal Olympic Village, located on the Black Sea coast in the Imereti Lowlands, consisted of 47 buildings covering 72 hectares. This village had the capacity to host up to 2,000 athletes and delegates. During the Olympic Winter Games, it housed athletes competing in hockey, curling, figure skating, speed skating, and short track. Yelena Isinbaeva served as the "mayor" of this village, and its mascot was the Polar Bear. The Mountain Olympic Village was the largest of the three, able to accommodate up to 3,000 athletes and delegates. It was home to athletes participating in alpine skiing, bobsleigh, freestyle, luge, Nordic combined, skeleton, ski jumping, and snowboarding. This village also featured the International Zone for interactions between athletes, media representatives, dignitaries, and visitors. It was conveniently located near the Rosa Khutor cable car stations. The village's mayor was Svetlana Zhurova and its mascot was the Leopard.

Sloboda Endurance Village, situated near the cross-country skiing and biathlon competition complex, was designed to provide accommodation for up to 1,100 athletes in cross-country skiing and biathlon, along with delegation members. Maxim Chudov was appointed as the mayor, and the village's mascot was the Hare.

In total, the Olympic Village had the capacity to house up to 6,000 athletes from 85 nations. The construction of the Olympic Village was undertaken by Basic Element, with Deputy CEO Andrey Elinson being in charge for the whole development. For his "significant contribution to the preparation and conduct of the 2014 Winter Olympics and Paralympics in Sochi", Elinson was awarded the Order of Friendship by the President of the Russian Federation in December 2014. The total cost of Sochi 2014 Olympic village's construction was $778M

== Updates ==
Environmental protection measures are being used in venue construction. These include being climate-neutral, games in harmony with nature, zero waste, and raising environmental awareness in preparing and hosting the 2014 Games. The 100th environmental protection measure was completed in October 2010. Slopes at the Rosa Khutor Alpine Resort were completed on 26 November 2010. A European Ski competition took place in early 2011 while a World Cup event took place in 2012.

== Post-Olympic usage ==
In October 2010, it was announced that the area around the Coastal Cluster would be used as part of a Formula 1 racing circuit to hold its first race in 2014. The Winter Games were completed with no problems and the first Grand Prix at the Sochi Autodrom took place on 12 October 2014, which was won by Lewis Hamilton and the fastest lap was set by Valtteri Bottas.

The World Chess Championship 2014 was held in Sochi in November.

On 2 December 2010, FIFA (International Federation of Association Football) awarded their 2018 World Cup to Russia. Among the venues used was Central Stadium (known as Sochi Olympic Stadium in Russia's bid package to FIFA), which was expanded to seat 47,659 after the Games.
