= Sochi Olympic Park =

Olympic park in Sochi

Coordinates: 43°24′20″N 39°57′17″E

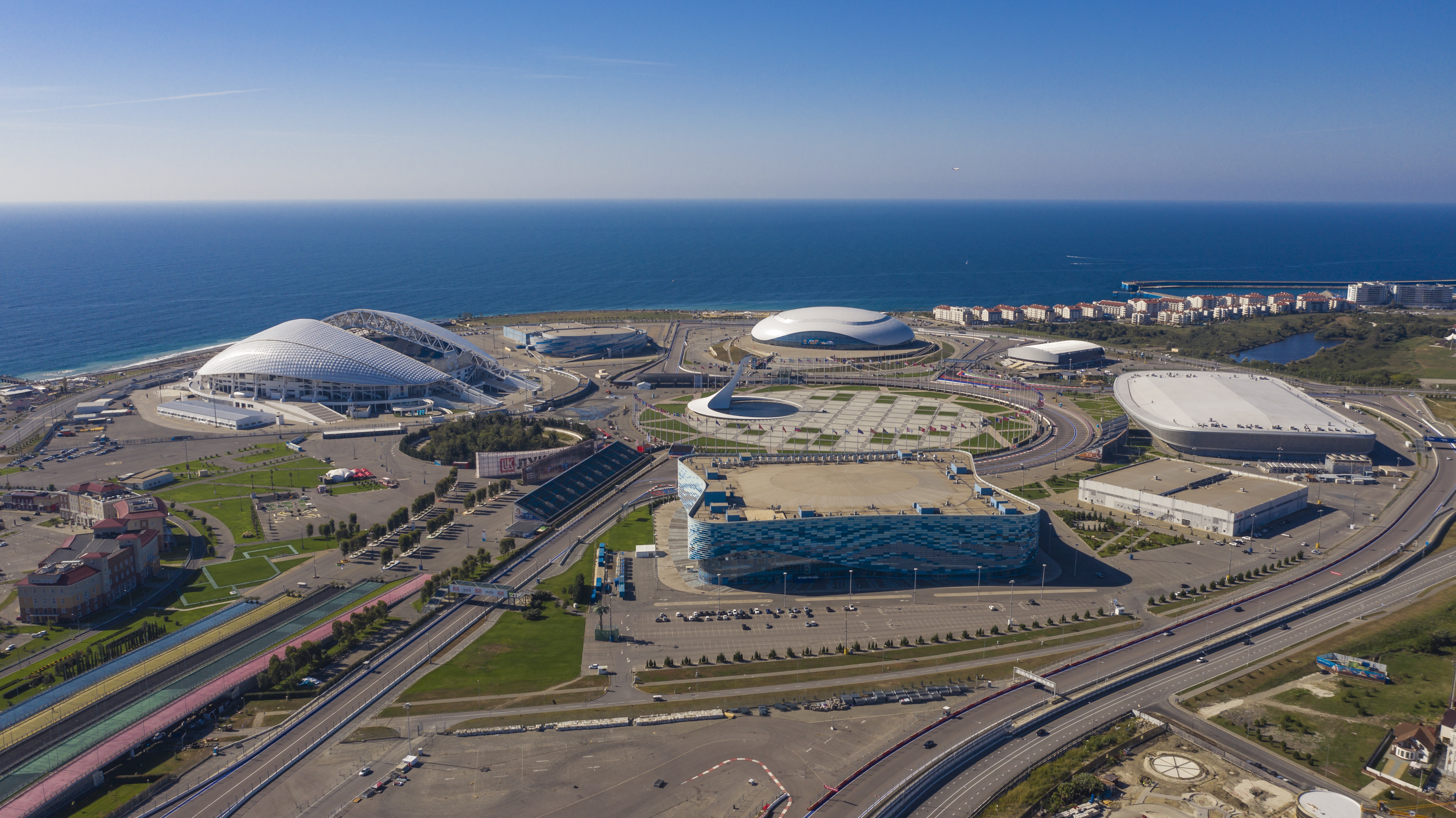
- Aerial view of Sochi Olympic Park in 2018
- Interactive map of Sochi Olympic Park
- Address: ул. Просвещения, Bolshoy Sochi, Krasnodar Krai
- Location: Sirius, Sochi, Russia.
- Type: Olympic Park

Construction
- Built: 2007–2013

Website
- Olympic Park

Sochi Olympic Park (Russian: Олимпийский парк Сочи) is an Olympic Park in Sochi, Russia. It situated in the urban-type settlement of Sirius in Imeretinsky Valley, on the coast of the Black Sea. The Olympic Park houses the main Olympic Stadium used for the Games' ceremonies, and the venues that were used for indoor sports such as hockey, figure skating, curling, and speed skating. It also houses training facilities, the Olympic Village, the international broadcasting centre, and other amenities. The park was designed so that all of the venues would be accessible within walking distance of each other. The venues are situated around a water basin containing a fountain known as "The Waters of the Olympic Park".

== History ==
Construction of the complex in the Imereti Lowlands began in 2007. The Imereti Lowlands was an important bird area that had been protected since 1911, most of which was destroyed during construction. Most of the venues were completed by 2013. The Olympic Park was located in the Adlersky City District of Sochi until 2019. However, in 2019, it was transferred into the newly established urban-type settlement of Sirius.

== Facilities ==
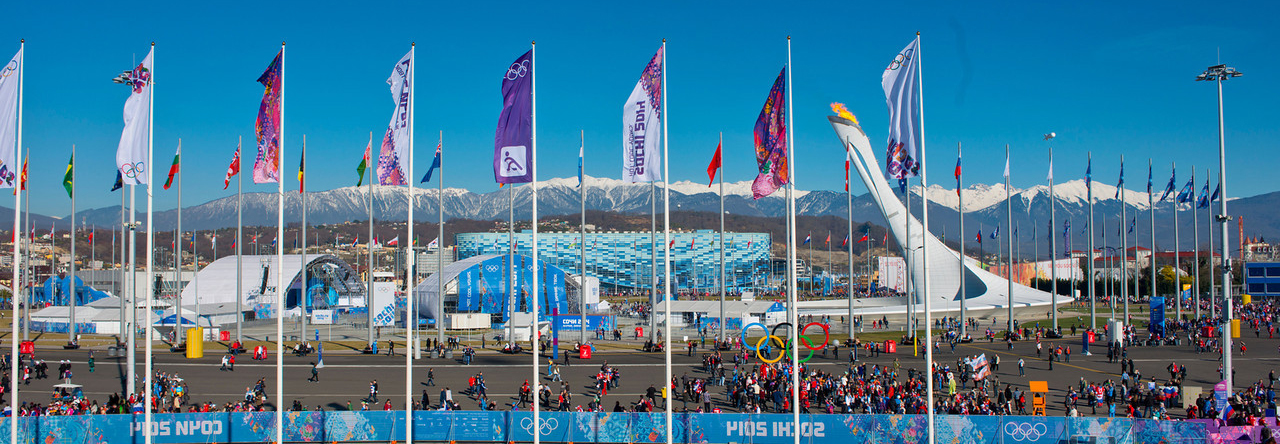
Panoramic view of Sochi Olympic Park around the time of the 2014 games

=== Current ===
Map of the Olympic Park during the 2014 Olympic Games, with all venues gathered around the Medals Plaza (Note: This map does not include the Sochi Autodrom, which was not finished at the time of the Olympics. This map also does not account for any other post-game modifications to the Olympic Park. While included in the map, the cemetery is not labeled)

- Adler Arena Skating Center: This 8,000-seat arena hosted the speed skating component of the Olympics. There are plans to potentially transform this arena into an exhibition hall for a more sustainable post-games use.
- Bolshoy Ice Dome: This 12,000-seat arena first opened in 2012. This venue hosted the 2013 IIHF World U18 Championships and the 2013 Channel One Cup. During the Olympics Bolshoy Ice Dome played host to matches of the ice hockey competition. It was the main venue of the men's tournament, as well as the medal round of the women's tournament. The arena was designed to resemble a frozen water droplet. Its signature feature is its roof, which contains LED lights on its outer shell that illuminate the arena at night. The Ice Dome will be converted into an entertainment centre and concert venue. The primary tenant of the arena is currently HC Sochi, a member of the KHL. Has also hosted other events, including the Channel One Cup in 2013.
- Fisht Olympic Stadium: This was the Olympic Stadium of the 2014 games, hosting the opening ceremony and the closing ceremony of the 2014 Winter Olympics, as well as the opening ceremony and the closing ceremony of the 2014 Winter Paralympics. For the winter games the stadium held a capacity of 40,000 spectators. The venue was one of eleven arenas to host matches in the 2018 FIFA World Cup and one of four to host the 2017 FIFA Confederations Cup. The stadium seated 47,659 when it hosted these matches. It was transformed from a domed stadium into an open-air venue during its World Cup renovation.
- Ice Cube Curling Center: This 3,000-seat arena hosted curling component of the Olympics, as well as the wheelchair curling component of the Paralympics.
- Iceberg Skating Palace: This 12,000-seat arena hosted the figure skating and the short track speed skating events of the Olympics. There have been plans to transform this venue into a track cycling velodrome for its post-game use.
- Shayba Arena: This 7,000-seat arena hosted some matches of the ice hockey competition during the Olympics, and was the venue for the ice sledge hockey tournament during the Paralympics. Shayba Arena and the Bolshoy Ice Dome are located 300 metres (980 ft) apart.
- Sochi Autodrom: This 5.848 km Formula One racing street circuit loops around the Sochi Olympic Park and has a capacity of 55,000 spectators. This venue was opened 21 September 2014, in time for the inaugural running of the Russian Grand Prix. It hosted Formula One from 2014 to 2021, as the race did not run in 2022, when the contract to host the race was terminated in response to Russia's invasion of Ukraine.
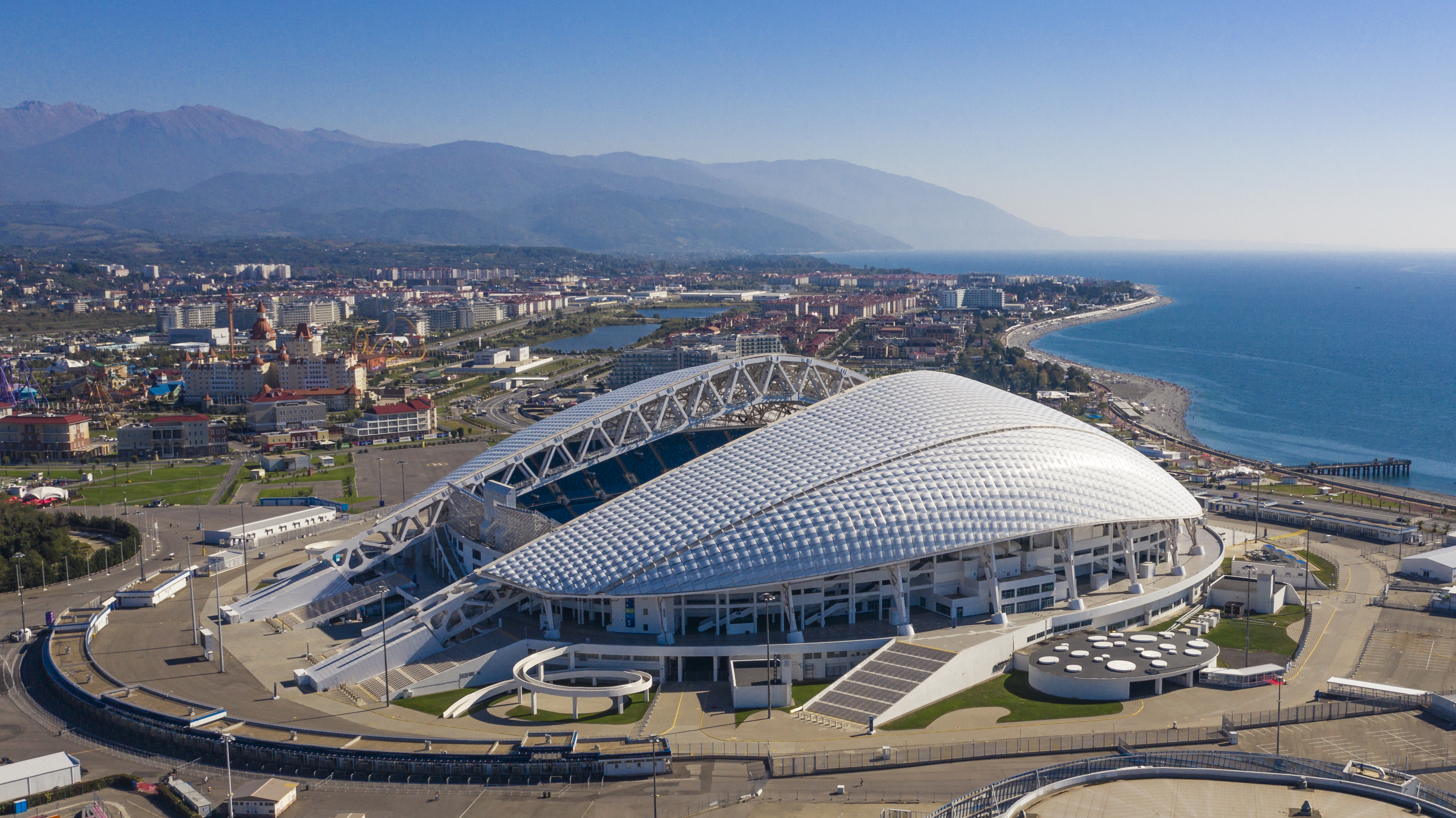
Fisht Olympic Stadium

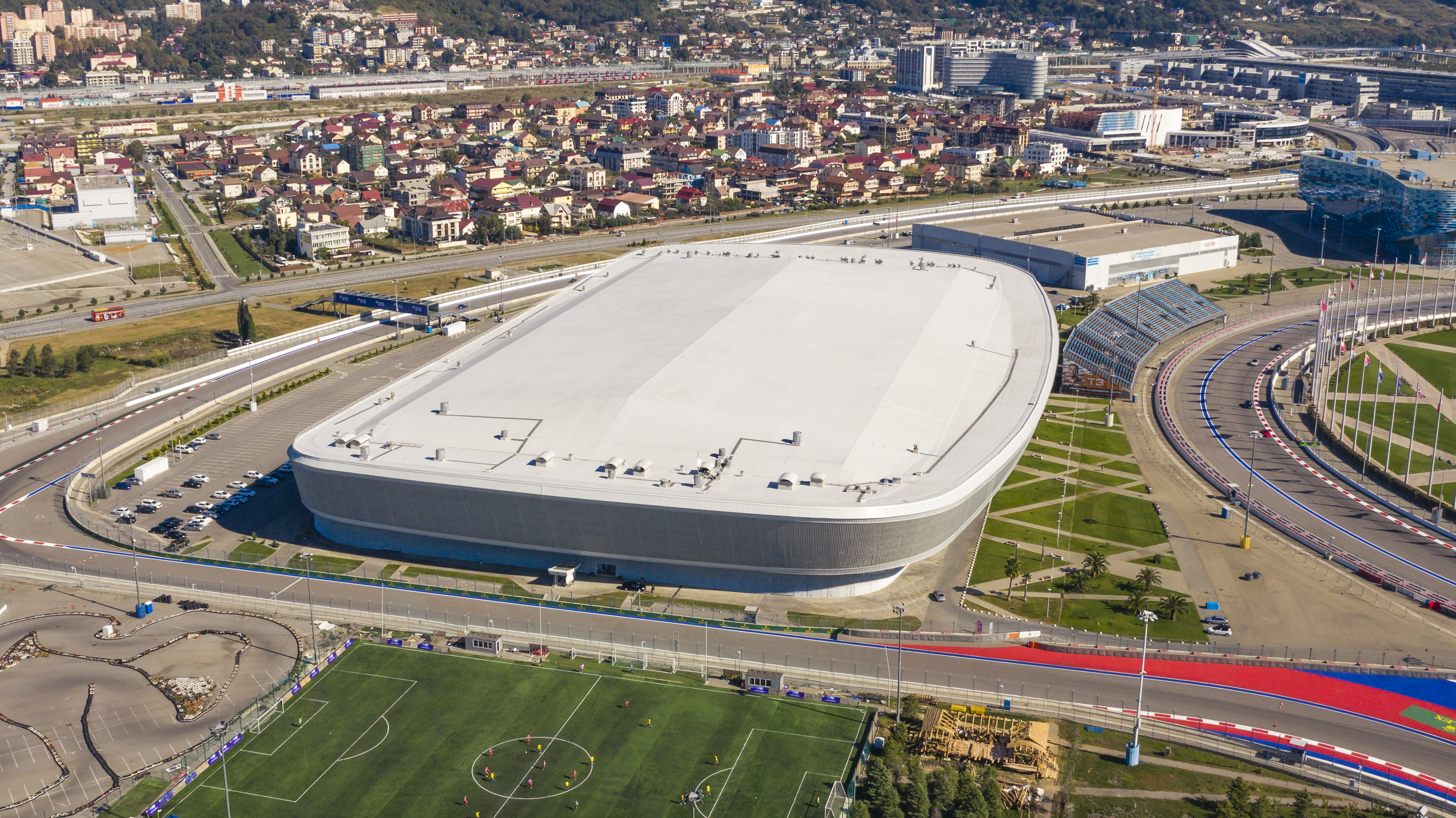
Adler Arena

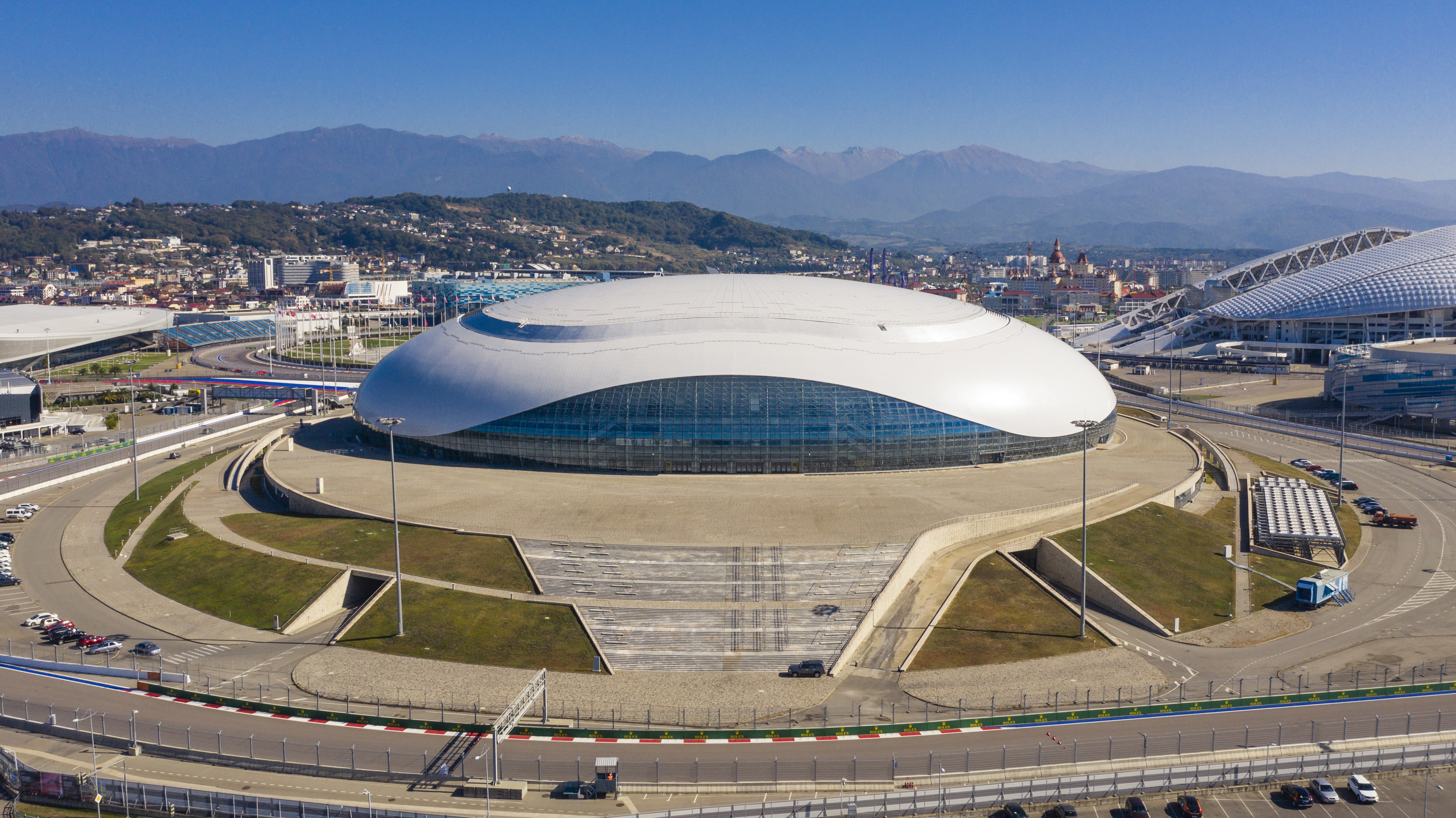
Bolshoy Ice Dome

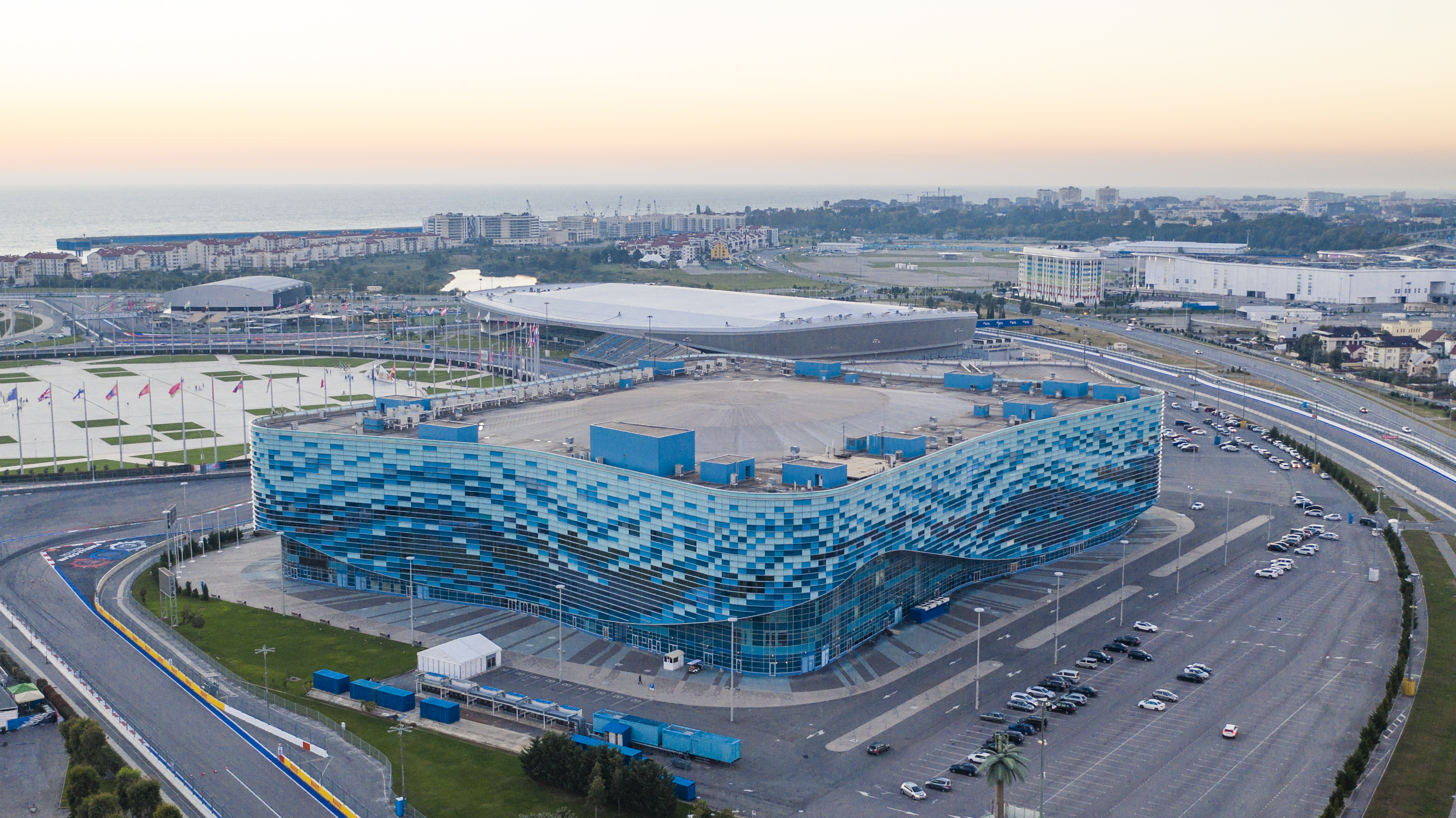
Iceberg Palace

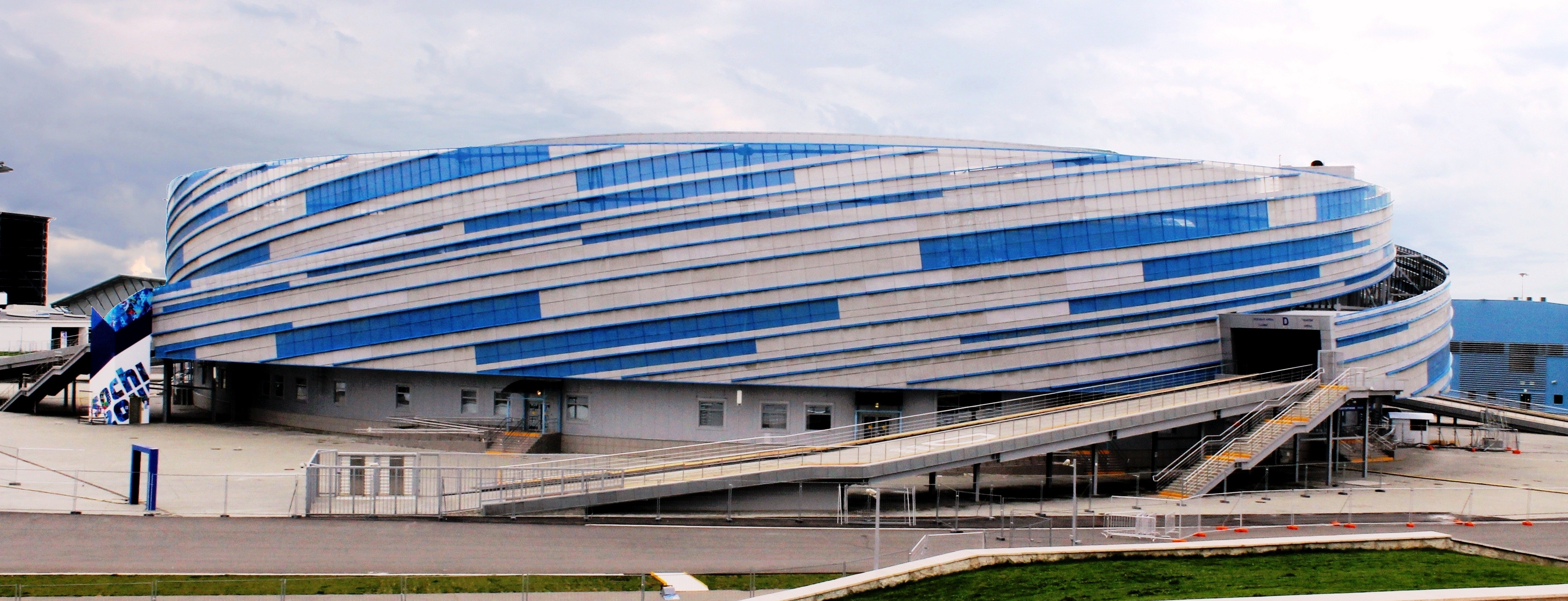
Shayba Arena

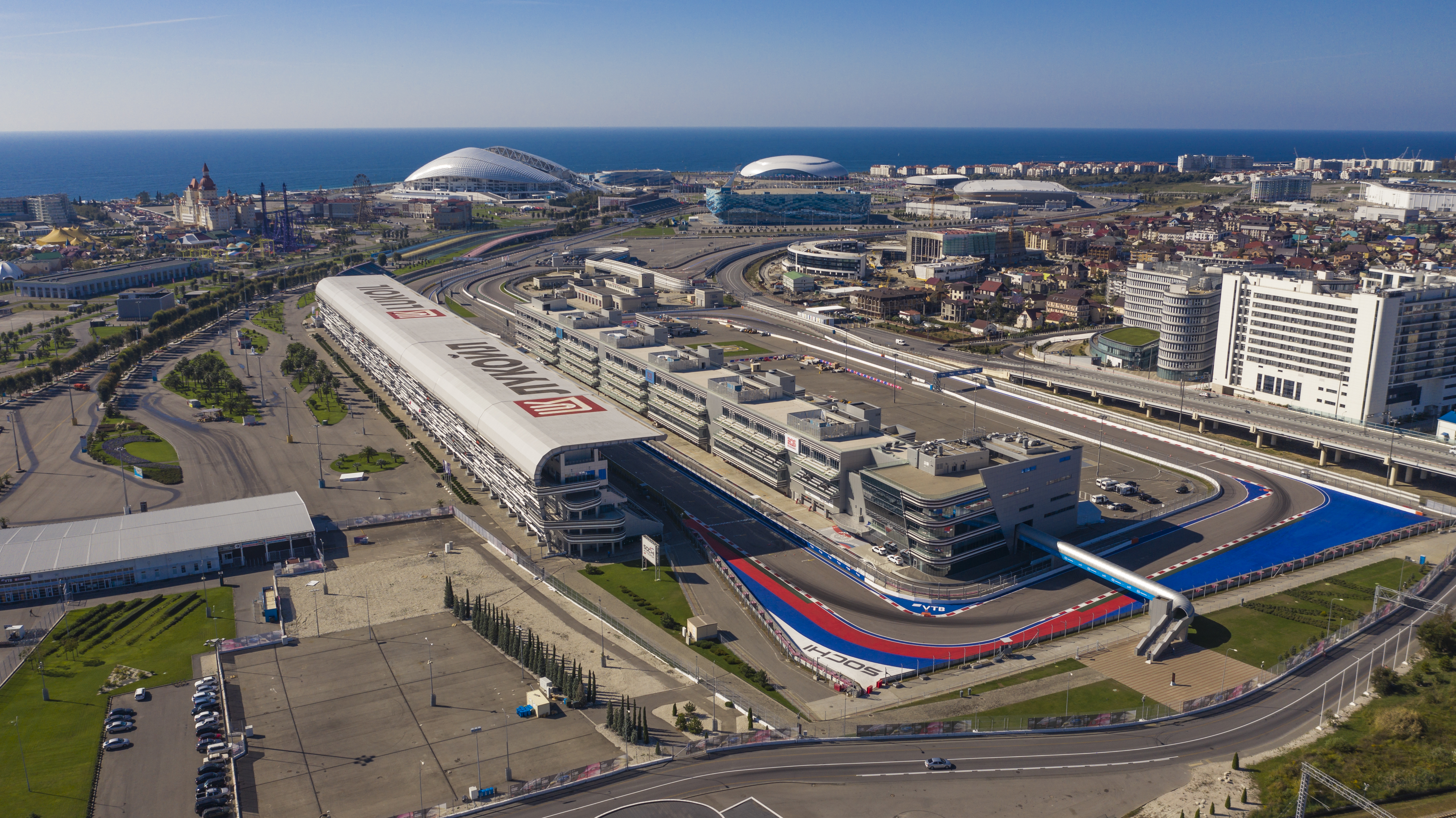
Sochi Autodrome

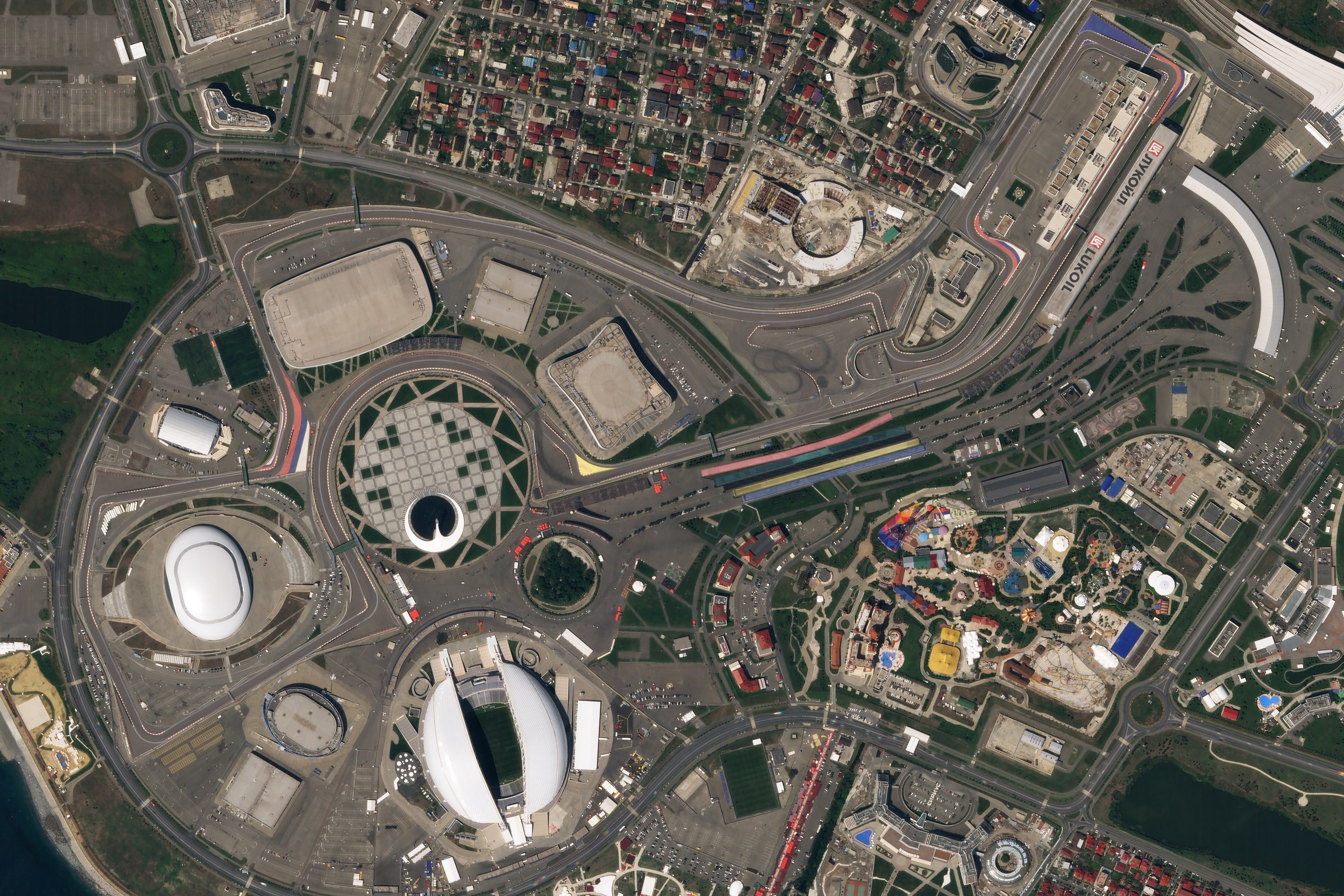
View from above

==== Other facilities ====
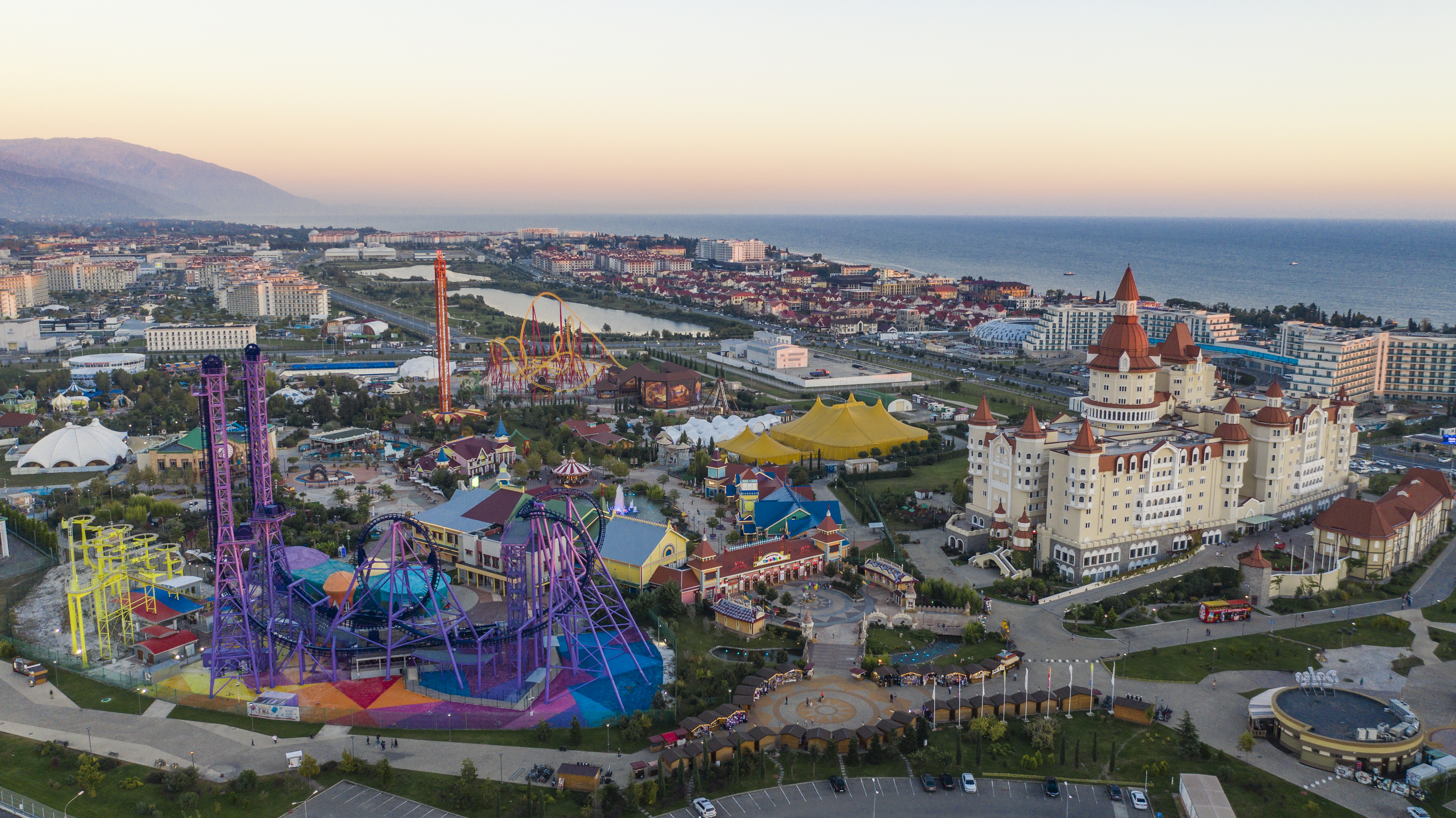
Sochi Park

- Olympic Village: The main Olympic Village of the 2014 games is within the Olympic Park. It was built by Basic Element. The village consists of 47 buildings and is designed for three thousand people. Athletes, journalists and members of the Olympic family were housed there. Plans are for the Olympic Village be an off-season resort complex Sochnoye' ("Juicy").
- Sochi Medals Plaza: This plaza previously accommodated 20,000 standing spectators for the victory ceremonies of the Olympic and Paralympic games. Portions of the venue now remain as a legacy feature of the Olympic Park.
- Sochi Media Center: This venue served as the IBC for the 2014 Olympic games. Also hosted the World Chess Championship 2014. There have been plans to transform the media center into a shopping mall for a more sustainable post-games use.
- Sochi Park: A theme park themed around the history and culture of Russia, Sochi Park is the country's first theme park. The park is 20.5 hectares, and features its own adventure park, and a hotel complex which is themed to a medieval-era castle. The park first opened only to spectators and athletes of the Olympic Games (during which it received 140,000 visitors). The park was opened to the general public on International Children's Day 1 June 2014, with an official opening on 28 June 2014.

===== Temporary structures =====
A range of temporary pavilions and other facilities were erected during the 2014 Winter Olympic Games, including:

- The Microsoft Pavilion: A modular building designed by the Nowadays Office architectural firm. Wooden slats featuring the colour scheme of the Microsoft logo formed the basis of the design, producing a moire effect.

===== Cemetery =====
Within the Olympic Park lies a 2-acre cemetery, which predates the Olympic venues by nearly a century. The cemetery, which dates back to 1915, contains the graves of individuals that belonged to the Old Believers faith. The cemetery is located between the Iceberg Skating Palace, Fisht Stadium, and the medals plaza. It is located in a circular grove, but is largely obscured by plants. During the Olympic and Paralympic games, Canada and the United States had National Houses located near the graveyard on the end opposite to the medals plaza. Dmitry Chernyshenko, the president and CEO of the Sochi Organizing Committee, claimed in a September 2013 New York Times interview that the cemetery was retained both in good-will, and due to Russian law forbidding the moving of the graves. A cemetery needs to have had no new burials for at least a half-century, and only through the decision of relatives of those buried could a cemetery be considered for relocation. Burials are still ongoing at the cemetery.

=== Former ===
- Hockey Training Rink- This was a training venue for Ice Hockey during the Olympics
- Ice Skating Training Rink -This was a training venue for Figure Skating during the Olympics

== Transportation ==
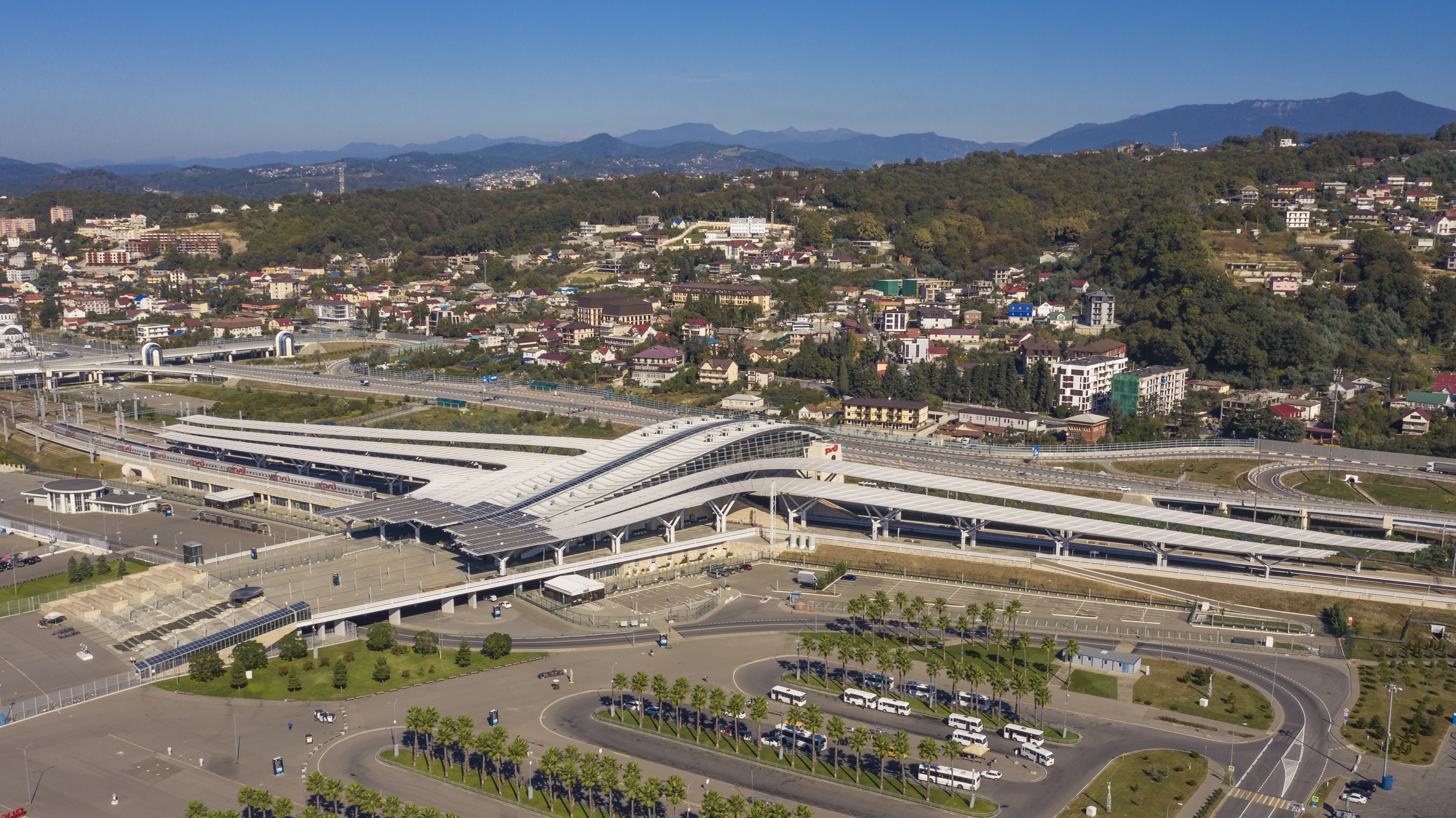
Olympic Park railway station

On the north end of the Olympic Park is the Olympic Village Station, and on the south end of the Olympic Park is the Olympic Park Station (the main transit hub of the Olympic Park). Both stations are stops on the Abkhazian railway. Just south of the Olympic Park is the M27 highway.

For the Olympics, a railway line was built connecting the Olympic Village with the airport, Sochi Olympic Village, central Sochi, and the station in Krasnaya Polyana (home to the mountain-cluster of Olympic venues). A highway was also built alongside this to further connect the Olympic Park to this area.

The Olympic Park was originally going to be serviced by several stations along the planned Sochi Light Metro, before that project was cancelled.

== Events ==
- 2012–2013 Grand Prix of Figure Skating Final at Iceberg Skating Palace 6–9 December 2012
- Russian Speed Skating Championships at the Adler Arena 26–27 December 2012
- 2013 World Single Distance Speed Skating Championships at Adler Arena 21–24 March 2013.
- 2013 IIHF World U18 Championships at Bolshoy Ice Dome 28 April 2013
- 2013 Channel One Cup at Bolshoy Ice Dome
- 2014 Olympic events 7–23 February 2014,
- 2014 Paralympic events 7–16 March 2014
- World Chess Championship 2014 at Sochi Media Center 7–28 November 2014
- 2014 World Robot Olympiad at Adler Arena Skating Center 21–23 November 2014
- Russian Figure Skating Championships (a qualifier for the European Figure Skating Championships) at the Iceberg Skating Palace 25–28 December 2014
- 2015 Kontinental Hockey League All-Star Game at the Bolshoy Ice Dome 25 January 2015.
- 2015 SportAccord International Convention 6–11 April 2015.
- 2015 World Mixed Doubles Curling Championship at the Ice Cube Curling Arena 18–25 April 2015.
- 2015 World Senior Curling Championships at the Iceberg Skating Palace 18–25 April 2015.
- 2015 Fed Cup semifinals at Adler Arena 18–19 April 2015
- 2015 New Wave music competition was held at the Olympic Medals Plaza
- 2017 VTB United Basketball League All-Star Game at Bolshoy Ice Dome
- 19th World Festival of Youth and Students events in October 2017

=== Football ===
- 2017 FIFA Confederations Cup matches at Fisht Olympic Stadium:

Date	Time (Moscow Time Zone)	Round	Team No. 1	Res.	Team No. 2	Spectators
19 June 2017	18:00	Group B	Australia	2–3	Germany	28,605
21 June 2017	21:00	Group A	Mexico	2–1	New Zealand	25,133
25 June 2017	18:00	Group B	Germany	3–1	Cameroon	30,230
29 June 2017	21:00	Semi-finals	Germany	4–1	Mexico	37,923

- 2018 FIFA World Cup matches at Fisht Olympic Stadium:

Date	Time (Moscow Time Zone)	Round	Team No. 1	Res.	Team No. 2	Spectators
15 June 2018	21:00	Group B	Portugal	3-3	Spain	43,866
18 June 2018	18:00	Group G	Belgium	3-0	Panama	43,257
23 June 2018	21:00	Group F	Germany	2-1	Sweden	44,287
26 June 2018	17:00	Group C	Australia	0-2	Peru	44,073
30 June 2018	21:00	Round of 16	Uruguay	2-1	Portugal	44,287
7 July 2018	21:00	Quarter-finals	Russia	1 (3) - (4) 1	Croatia	44,287

a: Maximum capacity of the station

=== Motor racing ===
Motor racing events held at the Sochi Autodrom:

- FIA Formula One Russian Grand Prix: 2014–2021
- GP2 Series: 2014–2015
- GP3 Series: 2014–2015
- Russian Touring Car Championship: 2014–2016
- TCR International Series: 2015–2016
