= Sirius (urban-type settlement) =

Urban locality in Krasnodar Krai, Russia

Sirius Сириус
- Urban locality
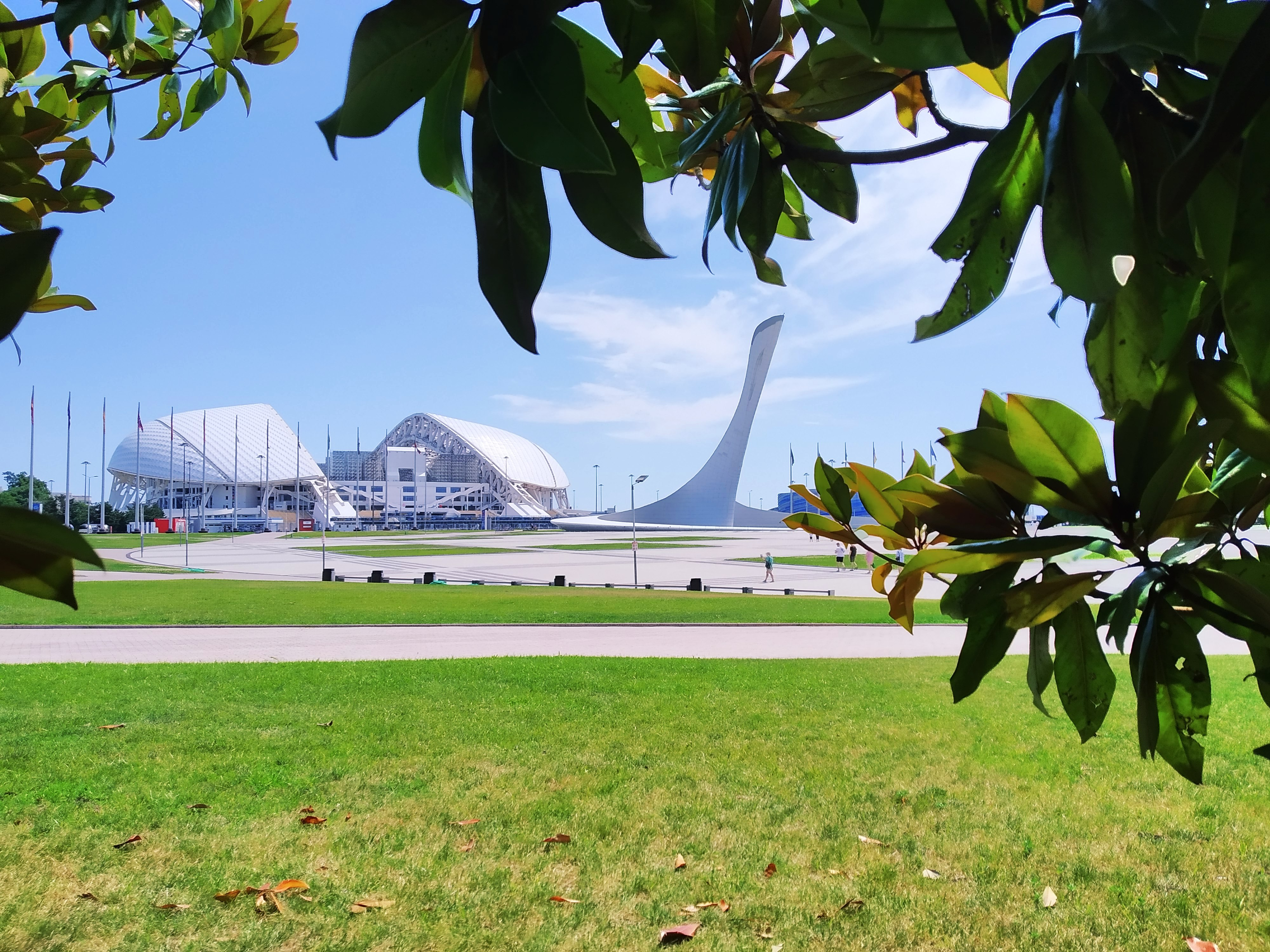

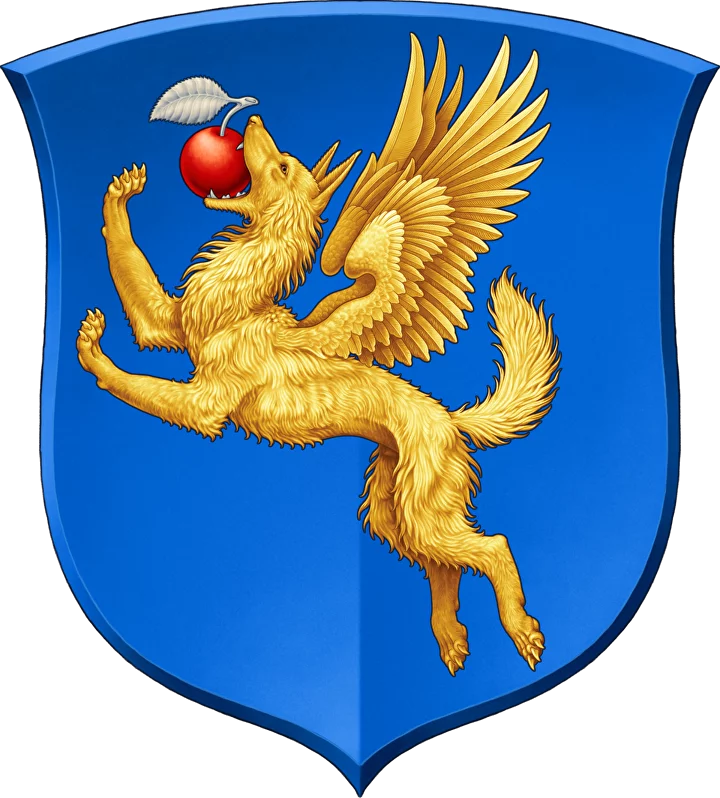
- Coat of arms
- Interactive map of Sirius
- Location of Sirius Sirius (Krasnodar Krai)
- Coordinates: 43°24′31″N 39°57′09″E
- Country: Russia
- Federal subject: Krasnodar Krai
- Administrative district: Federal territory
- Founded: July 2020

Population
  - Estimate (2025): 14,448 )
- Time zone: UTC+
- Postal code: 354340
- OKTMO ID: 02000000

Sirius (Russian: Сириус) is an urban locality (an urban-type settlement) in Krasnodar Krai, Russia. It is incorporated as a federal territory.

Sirius is located on the Black Sea coast, between the Mzymta in the northwest and the Psou on the southeast. The Psou also designated the state border between Georgia (Abkhazia) and Russia. From the inland site, Sirius is roughly bounded by A147 highway connecting Dzhubga via Tuapse and Sochi with the Russian border.

== History ==
Sirius was established in 2019 in part of the Imereti Lowlands which belonged to Adlersky City District of the city of Sochi. This is the area which was developed before the 2014 Winter Olympics. It was first subordinated to Sochi, and eventually on 22 December 2020 a law designating Sirius as the first ever federal territory was adopted and signed.

The settlement contains an eponymous education center and is expected to grow into a large high-tech campus. It also contains the Sochi Olympic Park, as well as the Sochi Autodrom.

== Economy ==
=== Transportation ===
The checkpoint between Russia and Abkhazia, close to the bridge over the Psou, is located in Sirius.

A railway connecting Sochi and Sukhumi across the border also crosses the area of Sirius. There are three railway stations, Imeretinsky Kurort, Olimpiyskaya Derevnya, and Vesyoloye. Imeretinsky Kurort is a terminus for suburban trains from Sochi, which also stop at Olimpiyskaya Derevnya. Vesyoloye is only served by long-distance passenger trains and by the suburban service to Gagra.
