= World Chess Championship 2014 =

Chess match between Magnus Carlsen and Viswanathan Anand

- Olympic Media Center, Sochi, Russia
- 8–23 November 2014
	Defending champion	Challenger
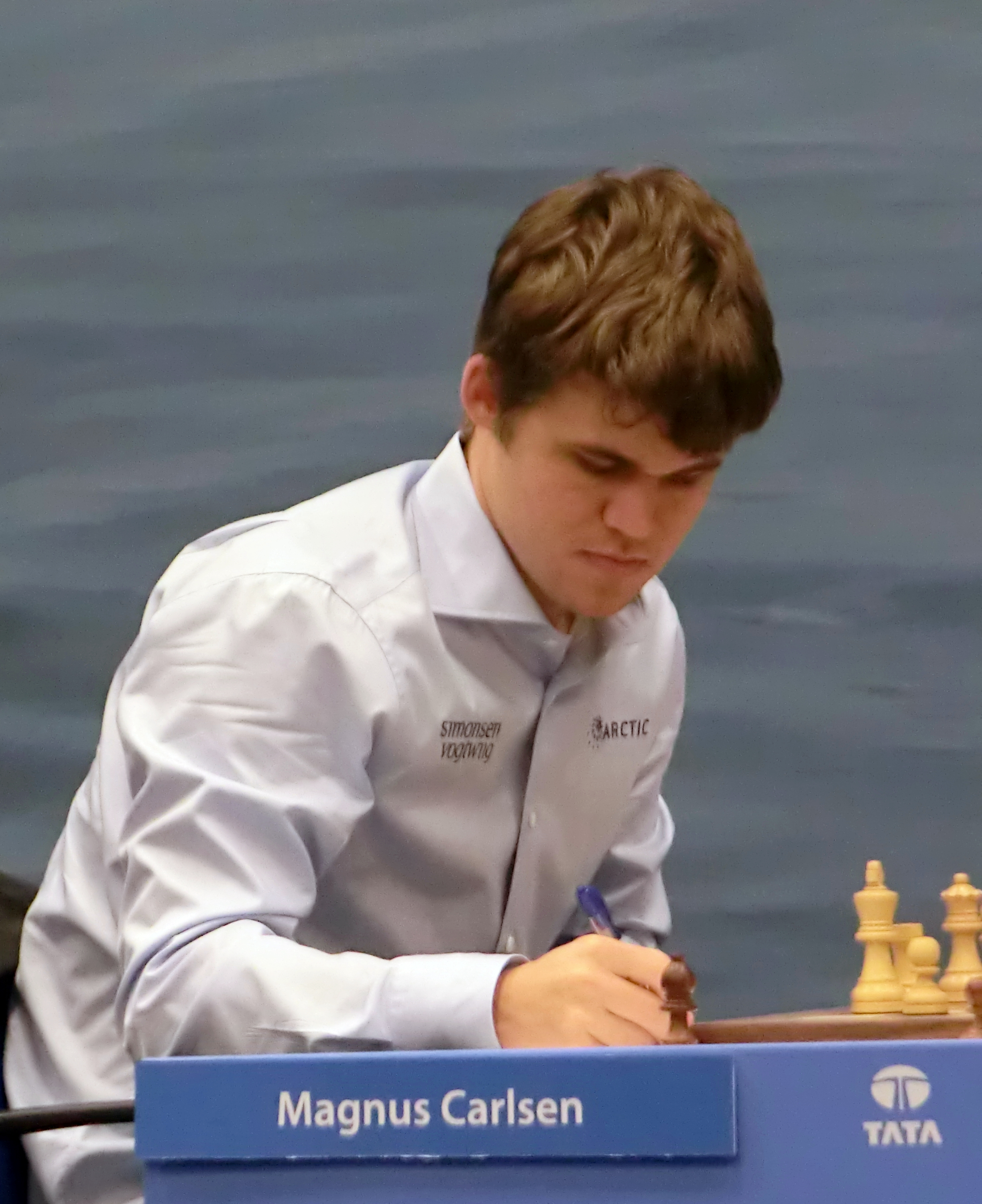
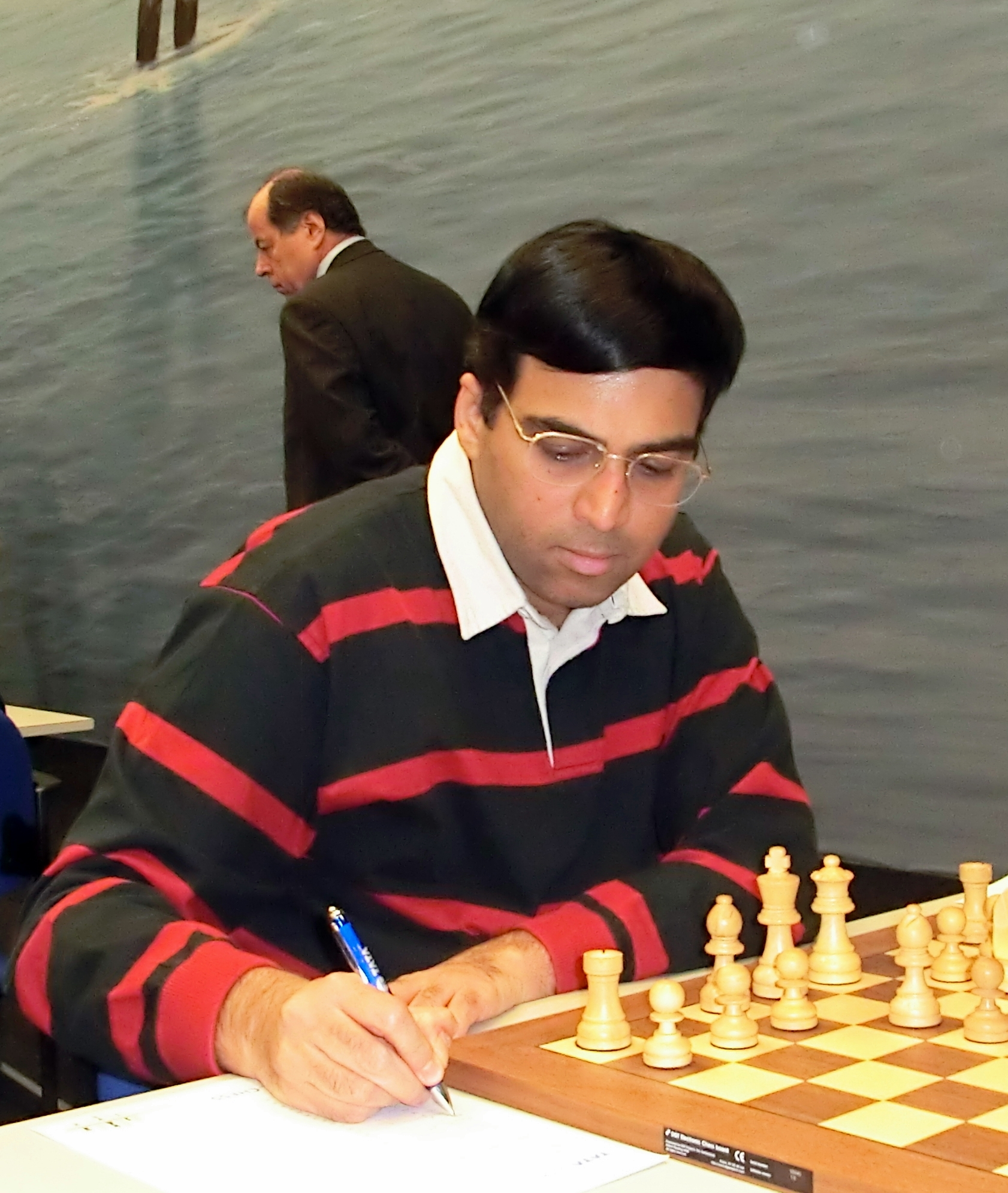
	Magnus Carlsen	Viswanathan Anand
	(Norway) Magnus Carlsen	(India) Viswanathan Anand
6½	Scores	4½
	Born 30 November 1990; 23 years old	Born 11 December 1969; 44 years old
	Winner of the World Chess Championship 2013	Winner of the Candidates Tournament 2014
	Rating: 2863 (World No. 1)	Rating: 2792 (World No. 6)

The World Chess Championship 2014 was a match between the world champion Magnus Carlsen and challenger Viswanathan Anand, to determine the World Chess Champion. It was held from 7 to 25 November 2014, under the auspices of the World Chess Federation (FIDE) in Sochi, Russia.

The match was decided after eleven of twelve scheduled games. On 23 November 2014 Carlsen retained his title, winning three games, losing one and drawing seven.

== Candidates Tournament ==
The challenger was determined in the 2014 Candidates Tournament, an eight-player double round-robin tournament that took place in Khanty-Mansiysk, Russia, from 13 March to 31 March 2014. The participants, in order of rules announced by FIDE, were:

Qualification path	Player	Age	March 2014 rating	Rank
2013 World Championship runner-up	(India) Viswanathan Anand	44	2770	8
The top two finishers in the Chess World Cup 2013	(Russia) Vladimir Kramnik	38	2787	3
The top two finishers in the Chess World Cup 2013	(Russia) Dmitry Andreikin	24	2709	42
The top two finishers in the FIDE Grand Prix 2012–13	(Bulgaria) Veselin Topalov	38	2785	4
The top two finishers in the FIDE Grand Prix 2012–13	(Azerbaijan) Shakhriyar Mamedyarov	28	2757	13
The next two highest rated players who played in the Chess World Cup 2013 or the FIDE Grand Prix 2012–13 (average FIDE rating on the 12 monthly lists from August 2012 to July 2013)	(Armenia) Levon Aronian	31	2830	2
The next two highest rated players who played in the Chess World Cup 2013 or the FIDE Grand Prix 2012–13 (average FIDE rating on the 12 monthly lists from August 2012 to July 2013)	(Russia) Sergey Karjakin	24	2766	9
Organizing committee's wild card (FIDE rating in July 2013 at least 2725)	(Russia) Peter Svidler	37	2758	11

The tournament had a prize fund of €420,000. Prize money was shared between players tied on points; tiebreaks were not used to allocate it. The prizes for each place were as follows:

- 1st place – €95,000
- 2nd place – €88,000
- 3rd place – €75,000
- 4th place – €55,000
- 5th place – €40,000
- 6th place – €28,000
- 7th place – €22,000
- 8th place – €17,000

=== Results ===
Final standings of the 2014 Candidates Tournament
Rank	Player	Rating March 2014	1 (ANA)		2 (KAR)		3 (KRA)		4 (MAM)		5 (AND)		6 (ARO)		7 (SVI)		8 (TOP)		Points	Tiebreaks		
Rank	Player	Rating March 2014	1 (ANA)		2 (KAR)		3 (KRA)		4 (MAM)		5 (AND)		6 (ARO)		7 (SVI)		8 (TOP)		Points	H2H	Wins	SB
			W	B	W	B	W	B	W	B	W	B	W	B	W	B	W	B				
1	(India) Viswanathan Anand	2770			½	½	½	½	½	1	½	½	1	½	½	½	1	½	8½	—	3	57.25
2	(Russia) Sergey Karjakin	2766	½	½			1	0	½	½	½	½	0	1	½	1	½	½	7½	—	3	51.75
3	(Russia) Vladimir Kramnik	2787	½	½	1	0			1	½	½	½	½	½	0	½	1	0	7	2½	3	49.25
4	(Azerbaijan) Shakhriyar Mamedyarov	2757	0	½	½	½	½	0			1	½	1	0	1	½	½	½	7	2	3	48.00
5	(Russia) Dmitry Andreikin	2709	½	½	½	½	½	½	½	0			1	½	½	0	1	½	7	1½	2	48.50
6	(Armenia) Levon Aronian	2830	½	0	0	1	½	½	1	0	½	0			1	½	½	½	6½	1½	3	45.00
7	(Russia) Peter Svidler	2758	½	½	0	½	½	1	½	0	1	½	½	0			1	0	6½	½	3	46.00
8	(Bulgaria) Veselin Topalov	2785	½	0	½	½	1	0	½	½	½	0	½	½	1	0			6	—	2	42.25

In the event of a tie, the following tie-break methods were used, in order of precedence:

1. Head-to-head scores between the tied players;
2. Highest number of wins;
3. The player with the highest Sonneborn–Berger score;
4. Rapid chess play-offs.

==== Pairings and results ====
Numbers in parentheses indicate players' scores prior to the round.

Round 1 – 13 March 2014
Dmitry Andreikin	Vladimir Kramnik	½–½	E32 Nimzo-Indian, Classical
Sergey Karjakin	Peter Svidler	½–½	B48 Sicilian, Taimanov
Shakhriyar Mamedyarov	Veselin Topalov	½–½	D11 Slav Accepted
Viswanathan Anand	Levon Aronian	1–0	C88 Ruy Lopez
Round 2 – 14 March 2014
Vladimir Kramnik (½)	Sergey Karjakin (½)	1–0	D20 Queen's Gambit Accepted
Peter Svidler (½)	Dmitry Andreikin (½)	1–0	B32 Sicilian Defence
Veselin Topalov (½)	Viswanathan Anand (1)	½–½	A11 English Opening
Levon Aronian (0)	Shakhriyar Mamedyarov (½)	1–0	D38 Queen's Gambit Declined
Round 3 – 15 March 2014
Dmitry Andreikin (½)	Sergey Karjakin (½)	½–½	C65 Ruy Lopez, Berlin Defence
Peter Svidler (1½)	Vladimir Kramnik (1½)	½–½	A35 English, Symmetrical
Veselin Topalov (1)	Levon Aronian (1)	½–½	C88 Ruy Lopez
Shakhriyar Mamedyarov (½)	Viswanathan Anand (1½)	0–1	D11 Slav Accepted
Round 4 – 17 March 2014
Shakhriyar Mamedyarov (½)	Dmitry Andreikin (1)	1–0	D45 Queen's Gambit Declined Semi-Slav
Sergey Karjakin (1)	Veselin Topalov (1½)	½–½	A29 English, Four Knights, Kingside Fianchetto
Levon Aronian (1½)	Peter Svidler (2)	1–0	D85 Grünfeld, Exchange
Viswanathan Anand (2½)	Vladimir Kramnik (2)	½–½	D37 Queen's Gambit Declined
Round 5 – 18 March 2014
Dmitry Andreikin (1)	Viswanathan Anand (3)	½–½	C65 Ruy Lopez, Berlin Defence
Sergey Karjakin (1½)	Shakhriyar Mamedyarov (1½)	½–½	B52 Sicilian Defence, Canal-Sokolsky Attack
Peter Svidler (2)	Veselin Topalov (2)	1–0	C78 Ruy Lopez
Vladimir Kramnik (2½)	Levon Aronian (2½)	½–½	E10 Queen's Pawn Game
Round 6 – 19 March 2014
Levon Aronian (3)	Dmitry Andreikin (1½)	½–½	A12 English, Caro-Kann Defensive System
Viswanathan Anand (3½)	Sergey Karjakin (2)	½–½	C67 Ruy Lopez, Berlin Defence, Open Variation
Shakhriyar Mamedyarov (2)	Peter Svidler (3)	1–0	A81 Dutch Defence
Veselin Topalov (2)	Vladimir Kramnik (3)	1–0	D37 Queen's Gambit Declined
Round 7 – 21 March 2014
Sergey Karjakin (2½)	Levon Aronian (3½)	0–1	C65 Ruy Lopez, Berlin Defence
Peter Svidler (3)	Viswanathan Anand (4)	½–½	C65 Ruy Lopez, Berlin Defence
Vladimir Kramnik (3)	Shakhriyar Mamedyarov (3)	1–0	D38 Queen's Gambit Declined
Dmitry Andreikin (2)	Veselin Topalov (3)	1–0	D30 Queen's Gambit Declined

Round 8 – 22 March 2014
Vladimir Kramnik (4)	Dmitry Andreikin (3)	½–½	D15 Queen's Gambit Declined Slav
Peter Svidler (3½)	Sergey Karjakin (2½)	0–1	A05 Réti Opening
Veselin Topalov (3)	Shakhriyar Mamedyarov (3)	½–½	B90 Sicilian Defence, Najdorf Variation
Levon Aronian (4½)	Viswanathan Anand (4½)	½–½	A11 English, Caro-Kann Defensive System
Round 9 – 23 March 2014
Sergey Karjakin (3½)	Vladimir Kramnik (4½)	1–0	D02 Queen's Pawn Game
Dmitry Andreikin (3½)	Peter Svidler (3½)	½–½	B90 Sicilian Defence, Najdorf Variation
Viswanathan Anand (5)	Veselin Topalov (3½)	1–0	B90 Sicilian Defence, Najdorf Variation
Shakhriyar Mamedyarov (3½)	Levon Aronian (5)	1–0	E20 Nimzo-Indian
Round 10 – 25 March 2014
Sergey Karjakin (4½)	Dmitry Andreikin (4)	½–½	B46 Sicilian Defence, Taimanov Variation
Vladimir Kramnik (4½)	Peter Svidler (4)	0–1	A80 Dutch Defense
Levon Aronian (5)	Veselin Topalov (3½)	½–½	D15 Queen's Gambit Declined Slav
Viswanathan Anand (6)	Shakhriyar Mamedyarov (4½)	½–½	B90 Sicilian Defence, Najdorf Variation
Round 11 – 26 March 2014
Dmitry Andreikin (4½)	Shakhriyar Mamedyarov (5)	½–½	E04 Catalan Opening, Open, 5. Nf3
Veselin Topalov (4)	Sergey Karjakin (5)	½–½	A30 English, Symmetrical
Peter Svidler (5)	Levon Aronian (5½)	½–½	A07 King's Indian Attack
Vladimir Kramnik (4½)	Viswanathan Anand (6½)	½–½	E06 Catalan Opening, Closed, 5.Nf3
Round 12 – 27 March 2014
Viswanathan Anand (7)	Dmitry Andreikin (5)	½–½	B18 Caro-Kann, Classical
Shakhriyar Mamedyarov (5½)	Sergey Karjakin (5½)	½–½	E20 Nimzo-Indian
Veselin Topalov (4½)	Peter Svidler (5½)	1–0	B49 Sicilian Defence, Taimanov Variation
Levon Aronian (6)	Vladimir Kramnik (5)	½–½	D36 Queen's Gambit Declined
Round 13 – 29 March 2014
Dmitry Andreikin (5½)	Levon Aronian (6½)	1–0	A45 Trompowsky Attack
Sergey Karjakin (6)	Viswanathan Anand (7½)	½–½	D36 Queen's Gambit Declined
Peter Svidler (5½)	Shakhriyar Mamedyarov (6)	½–½	B90 Sicilian Defence, Najdorf Variation
Vladimir Kramnik (5½)	Veselin Topalov (5½)	1–0	D43 Queen's Gambit Declined Semi-Slav
Round 14 – 30 March 2014
Levon Aronian (6½)	Sergey Karjakin (6½)	0–1	B23 Sicilian Defence, Closed
Viswanathan Anand (8)	Peter Svidler (6)	½–½	C89 Ruy Lopez, Marshall Attack
Shakhriyar Mamedyarov (6½)	Vladimir Kramnik (6½)	½–½	E32 Nimzo-Indian, Classical
Veselin Topalov (5½)	Dmitry Andreikin (6½)	½–½	C65 Ruy Lopez, Berlin Defence

== Championship match ==
The Championship match between Magnus Carlsen and Viswanathan Anand was held from 7 to 28 November 2014 in Sochi, Russia, under the auspices of FIDE.

=== Previous head-to-head record ===
Prior to the match, from 2005 to 6 November 2014, Anand and Carlsen had played 40 games against each other at classical time controls, out of which Carlsen won six, Anand won six, and twenty-eight were drawn.

Head-to-head record
		Carlsen wins	Draw	Anand wins	Total
Classical	Carlsen (white) – Anand (black)	4	13	4	21
Classical	Anand (white) – Carlsen (black)	2	15	2	19
Classical	Total	6	28	6	40
Blitz / rapid / exhibition		9	18	10	37
Total		15	46	16	77

=== Historical notes ===
Both Carlsen and Anand appeared in the 2013 Championship, Anand as the reigning world champion and Carlsen as the challenger. This marked the first time the same two opponents met in consecutive World Championship matches since Garry Kasparov played Anatoly Karpov five times between 1984 and 1990.

Anand is only the second former champion (after Karpov in 1987 and 1990) to win a Candidates tournament. At 44, Anand is the second oldest person to win a Candidates tournament, behind Viktor Korchnoi in 1977 and 1981.

=== World championship organization ===
The match organizers faced several significant hurdles in organizing the event. The match venue was not finalized until June 2014, because the formal application from Norway, which was expected to host the title match at the time, was not forthcoming. FIDE president Kirsan Ilyumzhinov announced in June that the match would be held in Sochi, Russia, in November 2014, disclosing an agreement to host the match signed with the regional governor of Russia's Krasnodar Region, Aleksandr Tkachyov.

In the third week of August, Carlsen requested that the match be postponed because he was not satisfied with the choice of venue. However, Anand agreed to play versus Carlsen in Sochi on the proposed dates, and in early August, Carlsen signed the agreement to defend his title in Sochi.

This left the organizers, Agon Limited, the holder of rights to holding FIDE international tournaments only two months to prepare and organize the event. However, Agon successfully met its obligations, organizing the event to everyone's satisfaction. Nevertheless, the minimum prize fund of 2 million euros specified in the FIDE-Agon contract was not met, failing by 50%.

Gazprom and Summa Group were the main sponsors of the match. According to the world championship's website, the 2014 title match broke global audience records, drawing more than one million viewers every day. The total number of unique visitors to the website during the match was 10.5 million, with 2 million people visiting the match website on the final day.

=== Venue ===
The match was held at the Olympic Media Center located in the Adler City District of Sochi, Imeretinsky Valley, on the Black Sea, next to the Sochi Olympic Park houses and the main Fisht Olympic Stadium. The Olympic Media Center served as the main media hub during the 2014 Winter Olympics.

Andrzej Filipowicz was chief arbiter for the match.

The FIDE press officer and photographer was Ukrainian Woman Grand Master Anastasiya Karlovich, who previously officiated at the World Chess Championships in 2012 and 2013.

=== Seconds ===
Both Carlsen and Anand had a team of seconds to aid in their match preparation. During the opening press conference, Anand revealed his seconds to be Krishnan Sasikiran, Radosław Wojtaszek and Grzegorz Gajewski. Carlsen's seconds were Peter Heine Nielsen and Jon Ludvig Hammer.

Although after the closing ceremony, in an interview with chief FIDE press officer Anastasiya Karlovich Carlsen revealed that also Laurent Fressinet and Michael Adams were helping him from home. Carlsen was also in touch with Garry Kasparov before the match. During the match Garry Kasparov was regularly in contact with Peter Heine Nielsen to give advice. During the match, the Carlsen's seconds team (Hammer, Fressinet and Adams) was located in the Norwegian resort of Kragerø helping him remotely, while Nielsen (Carlsen's main coach) was present in Sochi.

=== Format ===
The Championship match consisted of 12 games and, if necessary, tie-break games. The winner of the match would be the first player to score 6.5 points or more. The time control for the "classical" portion of the match was: 120 minutes for the first 40 moves, 60 minutes for the next 20 moves and then 15 minutes for the rest of the game with an increment of 30 seconds per move starting after move 61.

Had tie-breakers been necessary, four rapid games would have been played at a time control of 25 minutes plus a 10-second increment per move. If the score was still equal, up to five 2-game blitz matches (5 minutes + 3 seconds) would have been played, before a final "Armageddon" game. In that game, white would have received 5 minutes, black 4 minutes and a 3-second increment after move 61 for both; in the event of a draw, the player of the black pieces would have been declared champion.

The games were played according to the FIDE Laws of Chess prior to 1 July 2014, in order to keep uniformity throughout the entire championship cycle.

=== Prize fund ===
The prize fund was 1 million Euros. This is the minimum prize fund stipulated by FIDE in the official regulations. However, the FIDE-Agon contract (3.2b(i)) had required a 2 million euro minimum. If the match ended within the 12 regular games, 60 percent of the prize fund would go to the winner, while the loser receives the remaining 40 percent. If the match went to tie-break games, the winner would receive 55 percent and the loser 45 percent.

=== Schedule ===
The opening ceremony was held on 7 November 2014. The drawing of colours was held also at the opening ceremony. Unlike the 2013 match, Anand played with the white pieces in the first game.

The games started daily at 15:00 MSK (UTC+03:00).

Date	Day	Event
7 November 2014	Friday	Opening ceremony
8 November 2014	Saturday	Game 1
9 November 2014	Sunday	Game 2
10 November 2014	Monday	Rest day
11 November 2014	Tuesday	Game 3
12 November 2014	Wednesday	Game 4
13 November 2014	Thursday	Rest day
14 November 2014	Friday	Game 5
15 November 2014	Saturday	Game 6
16 November 2014	Sunday	Rest day
17 November 2014	Monday	Game 7

Date	Day	Event
18 November 2014	Tuesday	Game 8
19 November 2014	Wednesday	Rest day
20 November 2014	Thursday	Game 9
21 November 2014	Friday	Game 10
22 November 2014	Saturday	Rest day
23 November 2014	Sunday	Game 11
24 November 2014	Monday	Rest day
25 November 2014	Tuesday	Game 12
26 November 2014	Wednesday	Rest day
27 November 2014	Thursday	Tie-break games
28 November 2014	Friday	Awards and closing

As the match was decided after game 11, the closing ceremony was rescheduled to 25 November and game 12 was not played.

=== Results ===
World Chess Championship 2014
	Rating	Game 1 8 Nov.	Game 2 9 Nov.	Game 3 11 Nov.	Game 4 12 Nov.	Game 5 14 Nov.	Game 6 15 Nov.	Game 7 17 Nov.	Game 8 18 Nov.	Game 9 20 Nov.	Game 10 21 Nov.	Game 11 23 Nov.	Game 12 25 Nov.	Points
Magnus Carlsen (Norway)	2863	½	1	0	½	½	1	½	½	½	½	1	Not required	6½
Viswanathan Anand (India)	2792	½	0	1	½	½	0	½	½	½	½	0	Not required	4½

== Games ==
The player named first played the white pieces.

=== Game 1, Anand–Carlsen, ½–½ ===
Anand–Carlsen, game 1

Position: b7 black pawn, e7 black rook, g7 black king, f6 black pawn, g6 black pawn, a4 black pawn, d4 white rook, f4 white pawn, a3 white pawn, a2 white king, b2 white pawn, c2 black queen, h2 white pawn, f1 white queen

Position after 42.Rd4

The first game of the match was played on 8 November 2014. The game saw Anand use the Queen's Pawn Opening, to which Carlsen replied with the Grünfeld Defence. Anand, who went down on time as the game progressed, fought a queen and rook middle game to eventually draw with the World Champion. Carlsen didn't make the best of his chances with 42...Re3! He allowed a quick draw after 42...Re2 43.Rb4 b5 44.Qh1!

Grünfeld Defence, Exchange Variation (ECO D85)
1. d4 Nf6 2. c4 g6 3. Nc3 d5 4. cxd5 Nxd5 5. Bd2 Bg7 6. e4 Nxc3 7. Bxc3 0-0 8. Qd2 Nc6 9. Nf3 Bg4 10. d5 Bxf3 11. Bxg7 Kxg7 12. gxf3 Ne5 13. 0-0-0 c6 14. Qc3 f6 15. Bh3 cxd5 16. exd5 Nf7 17. f4 Qd6 18. Qd4 Rad8 19. Be6 Qb6 20. Qd2 Rd6 21. Rhe1 Nd8 22. f5 Nxe6 23. Rxe6 Qc7+ 24. Kb1 Rc8 25. Rde1 Rxe6 26. Rxe6 Rd8 27. Qe3 Rd7 28. d6 exd6 29. Qd4 Rf7 30. fxg6 hxg6 31. Rxd6 a6 32. a3 Qa5 33. f4 Qh5 34. Qd2 Qc5 35. Rd5 Qc4 36. Rd7 Qc6 37. Rd6 Qe4+ 38. Ka2 Re7 39. Qc1 a5 40. Qf1 a4 41. Rd1 Qc2 42. Rd4 (diagram) Re2 43. Rb4 b5 44. Qh1 Re7 45. Qd5 Re1 46. Qd7+ Kh6 47. Qh3+ Kg7 48. Qd7+ ½–½

=== Game 2, Carlsen–Anand, 1–0 ===
Carlsen–Anand, game 2

Position: f8 black rook, g8 black king, e7 white rook, g7 black pawn, h7 black pawn, d6 black queen, f6 black pawn, a5 black pawn, c5 black pawn, f5 white pawn, a4 white pawn, e4 white queen, h4 white pawn, f3 black pawn, g3 white pawn, c2 white pawn, f2 white pawn, h2 white king

Position after 34.g3

The second game was played on 9 November 2014. The opening was the solid Berlin variation of the Ruy Lopez where Carlsen played 4.d3 instead of the main line 4.0-0 Nxe4. Carlsen gave up the bishop pair to double Anand's c-pawns and the result of the opening was roughly equal. However, Anand's moves 16...Rd8, 18...Be6, and 19...Ng6 all contributed to making his position more unpleasant. In the heavy-piece endgame Carlsen's active pieces and outpost on e6 gave him a clear advantage. The game ended abruptly when Anand blundered with 34...h5??, allowing 35.Qb7 forcing instant resignation, because there is no good defense to 36.Rxg7+ Kh8 37.Rh7+ Kg8 38.Qg7 with checkmate. 34...Qd2 was the way to fight on but Anand's chances of a successful defence were slim. Carlsen took the lead in the match.

Ruy Lopez, Berlin Defence (ECO C65)
1. e4 e5 2. Nf3 Nc6 3. Bb5 Nf6 4. d3 Bc5 5. 0-0 d6 6. Re1 0-0 7. Bxc6 bxc6 8. h3 Re8 9. Nbd2 Nd7 10. Nc4 Bb6 11. a4 a5 12. Nxb6 cxb6 13. d4 Qc7 14. Ra3 Nf8 15. dxe5 dxe5 16. Nh4 Rd8 17. Qh5 f6 18. Nf5 Be6 19. Rg3 Ng6 20. h4 Bxf5 21. exf5 Nf4 22. Bxf4 exf4 23. Rc3 c5 24. Re6 Rab8 25. Rc4 Qd7 26. Kh2 Rf8 27. Rce4 Rb7 28. Qe2 b5 29. b3 bxa4 30. bxa4 Rb4 31. Re7 Qd6 32. Qf3 Rxe4 33. Qxe4 f3+ 34. g3 (diagram) h5 35. Qb7 1–0

=== Game 3, Anand–Carlsen, 1–0 ===
Anand–Carlsen, game 3

Position: c8 black rook, g8 black king, c7 white pawn, d7 black queen, f7 black pawn, h7 black pawn, b6 white queen, c6 white rook, e6 black pawn, d5 black rook, g5 black pawn, b4 black bishop, d4 white pawn, a3 black pawn, e3 white pawn, g3 white bishop, g2 white pawn, h2 white pawn, a1 white rook, g1 white king

Position after 28.Ra1

The third game was played on 11 November 2014. Anand's superior opening preparation was the decisive factor in this game. In a sharp, topical variation of the Queen's Gambit Declined involving an early queenside attack by White, he improved on an earlier game between Levon Aronian and Michael Adams. He soon had a clear advantage, his c-pawn on the 7th rank being far more dangerous than Carlsen's passed a-pawn. Carlsen, down to 6 minutes, blundered with 28...Ba5?, although his position was already poor. Anand leveled the match at 1½–1½. Over two matches (the earlier 2013 match, and this match), this was Anand's only victory over Carlsen in a world championship game.

Queen's Gambit Declined (ECO D37)
1. d4 Nf6 2. c4 e6 3. Nf3 d5 4. Nc3 Be7 5. Bf4 0-0 6. e3 Nbd7 7. c5 c6 8. Bd3 b6 9. b4 a5 10. a3 Ba6 11. Bxa6 Rxa6 12. b5 cxb5 13. c6 Qc8 14. c7 b4 15. Nb5 a4 16. Rc1 Ne4 17. Ng5 Ndf6 18. Nxe4 Nxe4 19. f3 Ra5 20. fxe4 Rxb5 21. Qxa4 Ra5 22. Qc6 bxa3 23. exd5 Rxd5 24. Qxb6 Qd7 25. 0-0 Rc8 26. Rc6 g5 27. Bg3 Bb4 28. Ra1 (diagram) Ba5 29. Qa6 Bxc7 30. Qc4 e5 31. Bxe5 Rxe5 32. dxe5 Qe7 33. e6 Kf8 34. Rc1 1–0

=== Game 4, Carlsen–Anand, ½–½ ===
Carlsen–Anand, game 4

Position: g8 black king, a7 black pawn, f7 black pawn, g7 black pawn, h6 black pawn, d5 black pawn, f5 black queen, d4 black knight, g4 white pawn, b3 white pawn, d3 white knight, h3 white pawn, a2 white pawn, e2 white queen, f2 white pawn, g2 white king

Position after 34.g4

The fourth game was played on 12 November 2014. Anand played the first Sicilian of the match, Carlsen opting to avoid the open Sicilian with the quiet 3.g3. Carlsen eventually gained a small advantage due to Black's isolated d-pawn, but Anand defended robustly. The game ended in a hard-fought draw.

Sicilian Defence (ECO B40) / King's Indian Attack (ECO A07)
1. e4 c5 2. Nf3 e6 3. g3 Nc6 4. Bg2 d5 5. exd5 exd5 6. 0-0 Nf6 7. d4 Be7 8. Be3 cxd4 9. Nxd4 Bg4 10. Qd3 Qd7 11. Nd2 0-0 12. N2f3 Rfe8 13. Rfe1 Bd6 14. c3 h6 15. Qf1 Bh5 16. h3 Bg6 17. Rad1 Rad8 18. Nxc6 bxc6 19. c4 Be4 20. Bd4 Nh7 21. cxd5 Bxd5 22. Rxe8+ Rxe8 23. Qd3 Nf8 24. Nh4 Be5 25. Bxd5 Qxd5 26. Bxe5 Qxe5 27. b3 Ne6 28. Nf3 Qf6 29. Kg2 Rd8 30. Qe2 Rd5 31. Rxd5 cxd5 32. Ne5 Qf5 33. Nd3 Nd4 34. g4 (diagram) Qd7 35. Qe5 Ne6 36. Kg3 Qb5 37. Nf4 Nxf4 38. Kxf4 Qb4+ 39. Kf3 d4 40. Qe8+ Kh7 41. Qxf7 Qd2 42. Qf5+ Kh8 43. h4 Qxa2 44. Qe6 Qd2 45. Qe8+ Kh7 46. Qe4+ Kh8 47. Qe8+ Kh7 ½–½

=== Game 5, Anand–Carlsen, ½–½ ===
Anand–Carlsen, game 5

Position: d8 black rook, f8 black rook, g8 black king, a7 black pawn, f7 black pawn, g7 black pawn, b6 black pawn, f6 black queen, h6 black pawn, a5 black knight, d5 white bishop, f3 white queen, g3 white pawn, a2 white pawn, b2 white pawn, f2 white pawn, h2 white pawn, a1 white rook, e1 white rook, g1 white king

Position after 22.Qf3

The fifth game was played on 14 November 2014. Carlsen played a rare line in the Queen's Indian Defense, but Anand was well prepared and soon gained the advantage. On move 22, Carlsen made a risky decision to capture a pawn on b2 rather than enter an inferior endgame. He soon had to return the pawn and spoil his king's side pawn structure, but at the same time he managed to liquidate the pawns on the queen's side. The game was drawn shortly afterwards.

Queen's Indian Defense (ECO E15)
1. d4 Nf6 2. c4 e6 3. Nf3 b6 4. g3 Bb4+ 5. Bd2 Be7 6. Nc3 Bb7 7. Bg2 c6 8. e4 d5 9. exd5 cxd5 10. Ne5 0-0 11. 0-0 Nc6 12. cxd5 Nxe5 13. d6 Nc6 14. dxe7 Qxe7 15. Bg5 h6 16. d5 Na5 17. Bxf6 Qxf6 18. dxe6 Qxe6 19. Re1 Qf6 20. Nd5 Bxd5 21. Bxd5 Rad8 22. Qf3 (diagram) Qxb2 23. Rad1 Qf6 24. Qxf6 gxf6 25. Re7 Kg7 26. Rxa7 Nc6 27. Rb7 Nb4 28. Bb3 Rxd1+ 29. Bxd1 Nxa2 30. Rxb6 Nc3 31. Bf3 f5 32. Kg2 Rd8 33. Rc6 Ne4 34. Bxe4 fxe4 35. Rc4 f5 36. g4 Rd2 37. gxf5 e3 38. Re4 Rxf2+ 39. Kg3 Rxf5 ½–½

=== Game 6, Carlsen–Anand, 1–0 ===
Carlsen–Anand, game 6

Position: g8 black rook, h8 black rook, b7 black king, f7 black pawn, b6 black pawn, c6 black bishop, e6 black pawn, g6 black knight, h6 black pawn, a5 black pawn, c5 black pawn, e5 white pawn, h5 white rook, c4 white pawn, g4 white rook, c3 white pawn, e3 white bishop, a2 white pawn, c2 white bishop, d2 white king, f2 white pawn, g2 white pawn

Position after 26.Kd2?? Anand (Black) could now gain a large advantage with 26...Nxe5!, but instead play continued 26...a4?? 27.Ke2.

The sixth game was played on 15 November 2014. Carlsen adopted the space-gaining Maróczy Bind setup against the Kan Variation of the Sicilian Defence, and accepted a set of isolated doubled pawns in return for active play. After an early queen exchange he soon developed a commanding position and appeared to have excellent winning chances. At move 26 there was a double blunder. Carlsen's 26.Kd2?? should have been answered with 26...Nxe5! (with a discovered attack on the g4-rook) 27.Rxg8 Nxc4+ (zwischenzug) 28.Kd3 Nb2+ 29.Ke2 Rxg8, and Black will wind up with 2 extra pawns (on e5 and c4) and excellent winning chances. However, Anand missed this and rather quickly played 26...a4?? Carlsen made no further mistakes and converted his advantage into a win.

Sicilian Defence, Kan Variation (ECO B41)
1. e4 c5 2. Nf3 e6 3. d4 cxd4 4. Nxd4 a6 5. c4 Nf6 6. Nc3 Bb4 7. Qd3 Nc6 8. Nxc6 dxc6 9. Qxd8+ Kxd8 10. e5 Nd7 11. Bf4 Bxc3+ 12. bxc3 Kc7 13. h4 b6 14. h5 h6 15. 0-0-0 Bb7 16. Rd3 c5 17. Rg3 Rag8 18. Bd3 Nf8 19. Be3 g6 20. hxg6 Nxg6 21. Rh5 Bc6 22. Bc2 Kb7 23. Rg4 a5 24. Bd1 Rd8 25. Bc2 Rdg8 26. Kd2 (diagram) a4 27. Ke2 a3 28. f3 Rd8 29. Ke1 Rd7 30. Bc1 Ra8 31. Ke2 Ba4 32. Be4+ Bc6 33. Bxg6 fxg6 34. Rxg6 Ba4 35. Rxe6 Rd1 36. Bxa3 Ra1 37. Ke3 Bc2 38. Re7+ 1–0

=== Game 7, Carlsen–Anand, ½–½ ===
Carlsen–Anand, game 7

Position: d8 black king, g8 black rook, a7 black pawn, b7 black pawn, c7 black pawn, e6 black bishop, c5 black pawn, e5 black pawn, h5 white rook, g4 white pawn, f3 white pawn, g3 white knight, b2 white pawn, c2 white pawn, f2 white king

Position after 31.Rh5

The seventh game was played on 17 November 2014. The opening was the highly theoretical Berlin Defence of the Ruy Lopez. Carlsen retained a slight advantage, despite sacrificing a pawn. At move 31 Carlsen was poised to win back the e5-pawn, thereby establishing connected passed pawns, but Anand instead sacrificed his bishop for two pawns and cleared away all the pawns on the kingside. With an extra knight, Carlsen tried to win but he was unable to penetrate Anand's defenses. Eventually the players traded down into a rook and knight versus rook endgame that is a theoretical draw and Anand made no mistakes while defending it. Carlsen finally acquiesced to a rook exchange on move 121, drawing immediately. With this draw, Carlsen still led by one point.

Ruy Lopez, Berlin Defence (ECO C67)
1. e4 e5 2. Nf3 Nc6 3. Bb5 Nf6 4. 0-0 Nxe4 5. d4 Nd6 6. Bxc6 dxc6 7. dxe5 Nf5 8. Qxd8+ Kxd8 9. h3 Ke8 10. Nc3 h5 11. Bf4 Be7 12. Rad1 Be6 13. Ng5 Rh6 14. g3 Bxg5 15. Bxg5 Rg6 16. h4 f6 17. exf6 gxf6 18. Bf4 Nxh4 19. f3 Rd8 20. Kf2 Rxd1 21. Nxd1 Nf5 22. Rh1 Bxa2 23. Rxh5 Be6 24. g4 Nd6 25. Rh7 Nf7 26. Ne3 Kd8 27. Nf5 c5 28. Ng3 Ne5 29. Rh8+ Rg8 30. Bxe5 fxe5 31. Rh5 (diagram) Bxg4 32. fxg4 Rxg4 33. Rxe5 b6 34. Ne4 Rh4 35. Ke2 Rh6 36. b3 Kd7 37. Kd2 Kc6 38. Nc3 a6 39. Re4 Rh2+ 40. Kc1 Rh1+ 41. Kb2 Rh6 42. Nd1 Rg6 43. Ne3 Rh6 44. Re7 Rh2 45. Re6+ Kb7 46. Kc3 Rh4 47. Kb2 Rh2 48. Nd5 Rd2 49. Nf6 Rf2 50. Kc3 Rf4 51. Ne4 Rh4 52. Nf2 Rh2 53. Rf6 Rh7 54. Nd3 Rh3 55. Kd2 Rh2+ 56. Rf2 Rh4 57. c4 Rh3 58. Kc2 Rh7 59. Nb2 Rh5 60. Re2 Rg5 61. Nd1 b5 62. Nc3 c6 63. Ne4 Rh5 64. Nf6 Rg5 65. Re7+ Kb6 66. Nd7+ Ka5 67. Re4 Rg2+ 68. Kc1 Rg1+ 69. Kd2 Rg2+ 70. Ke1 bxc4 71. Rxc4 Rg3 72. Nxc5 Kb5 73. Rc2 a5 74. Kf2 Rh3 75. Rc1 Kb4 76. Ke2 Rc3 77. Nd3+ Kxb3 78. Ra1 Kc4 79. Nf2 Kb5 80. Rb1+ Kc4 81. Ne4 Ra3 82. Nd2+ Kd5 83. Rh1 a4 84. Rh5+ Kd4 85. Rh4+ Kc5 86. Kd1 Kb5 87. Kc2 Rg3 88. Ne4 Rg2+ 89. Kd3 a3 90. Nc3+ Kb6 91. Ra4 a2 92. Nxa2 Rg3+ 93. Kc2 Rg2+ 94. Kb3 Rg3+ 95. Nc3 Rh3 96. Rb4+ Kc7 97. Rg4 Rh7 98. Kc4 Rf7 99. Rg5 Kb6 100. Na4+ Kc7 101. Kc5 Kd7 102. Kb6 Rf1 103. Nc5+ Ke7 104. Kxc6 Rd1 105. Rg6 Kf7 106. Rh6 Rg1 107. Kd5 Rg5+ 108. Kd4 Rg6 109. Rh1 Rg2 110. Ne4 Ra2 111. Rf1+ Ke7 112. Nc3 Rh2 113. Nd5+ Kd6 114. Rf6+ Kd7 115. Nf4 Rh1 116. Rg6 Rd1+ 117. Nd3 Ke7 118. Ra6 Kd7 119. Ke4 Ke7 120. Rc6 Kd7 121. Rc1 Rxc1 122. Nxc1 ½–½

This is the third-longest game ever played in a World Chess Championship. Carlsen later set the record in Game 6 of the 2021 World Championship, in which he defeated Ian Nepomniachtchi in 136 moves.

=== Game 8, Anand–Carlsen, ½–½ ===
Anand–Carlsen, game 8

Position: d8 black rook, e8 black rook, g8 black king, b7 black bishop, e7 black bishop, f7 black pawn, g7 black pawn, a6 black pawn, c6 black knight, e6 black pawn, h6 black pawn, a5 black queen, b5 black pawn, c5 white knight, a3 white pawn, e3 white pawn, f3 white knight, b2 white pawn, c2 white queen, f2 white pawn, g2 white pawn, h2 white pawn, b1 white bishop, d1 white rook, f1 white rook, g1 white king

Position after 20.Nc5

The eighth game was played on 18 November 2014. The opening was a Queen's Gambit Declined with 5.Bf4 which had won for Anand in game 3. Carlsen deviated from that game by playing 6...c5, an older line that was popular in the 1970s to 1990s but now less fashionable. During the game, Anand piled up a bishop and queen on the b1-h7 diagonal against Carlsen's king, but Carlsen was able to initiate a series of exchanges and obtain an easily drawn endgame.

Queen's Gambit Declined (ECO D37)
1. d4 Nf6 2. c4 e6 3. Nf3 d5 4. Nc3 Be7 5. Bf4 0-0 6. e3 c5 7. dxc5 Bxc5 8. a3 Nc6 9. Qc2 Re8 10. Bg5 Be7 11. Rd1 Qa5 12. Bd3 h6 13. Bh4 dxc4 14. Bxc4 a6 15. 0-0 b5 16. Ba2 Bb7 17. Bb1 Rad8 18. Bxf6 Bxf6 19. Ne4 Be7 20. Nc5 (diagram) Bxc5 21. Qxc5 b4 22. Rc1 bxa3 23. bxa3 Qxc5 24. Rxc5 Ne7 25. Rfc1 Rc8 26. Bd3 Red8 27. Rxc8 Rxc8 28. Rxc8+ Nxc8 29. Nd2 Nb6 30. Nb3 Nd7 31. Na5 Bc8 32. Kf1 Kf8 33. Ke1 Ke7 34. Kd2 Kd6 35. Kc3 Ne5 36. Be2 Kc5 37. f4 Nc6 38. Nxc6 Kxc6 39. Kd4 f6 40. e4 Kd6 41. e5+ ½–½

=== Game 9, Carlsen–Anand, ½–½ ===
Carlsen–Anand, game 9

Position: a8 black rook, h8 black rook, a7 black pawn, b7 black bishop, c7 black pawn, f7 black king, g7 black pawn, b6 black pawn, c6 black pawn, d6 black bishop, f5 black knight, g5 white knight, h5 black pawn, f4 white knight, h3 white pawn, a2 white pawn, b2 white pawn, c2 white pawn, f2 white pawn, g2 white pawn, a1 white rook, c1 white bishop, d1 white rook, g1 white king

Position after 16.Ng5+

The ninth game was played on 20 November 2014. The opening was the Berlin Defence of the Ruy Lopez. The game was drawn due to threefold repetition on the 20th move. This game included no original moves. The draw meant that Carlsen was closer to converting his 1-point lead to a match win, though Anand seemed satisfied to draw early and focus on his two remaining games with the white pieces.

Ruy Lopez, Berlin Defence (ECO C67)
1.e4 e5 2. Nf3 Nc6 3. Bb5 Nf6 4. 0-0 Nxe4 5. d4 Nd6 6. Bxc6 dxc6 7. dxe5 Nf5 8. Qxd8+ Kxd8 9. h3 Ke8 10. Nc3 h5 11. Ne2 b6 12. Rd1 Ba6 13. Nf4 Bb7 14. e6 Bd6 15. exf7+ Kxf7 16. Ng5+ (diagram) Kf6 17. Ne4+ Kf7 18. Ng5+ Kf6 19. Ne4+ Kf7 20. Ng5+ ½–½

Although a short draw at 20 moves, this game is far from the shortest in match history; a pair of 10-move draws sealed Petrosian's match victory over Botvinnik in 1963.

=== Game 10, Anand–Carlsen, ½–½ ===
Anand–Carlsen, game 10

Position: g8 black king, a7 black pawn, b7 black pawn, d7 black rook, f7 black pawn, d6 white pawn, g6 black pawn, c5 black pawn, e5 black rook, b4 black knight, h4 white pawn, f3 white bishop, a2 white pawn, d2 white rook, f2 white pawn, g2 white pawn, c1 white rook, g1 white king

Position after 27...Rxe5

The tenth game was played on 21 November 2014. As in the first game, Carlsen played the Grünfeld Defence but Anand met it with the Russian System instead of the Exchange variation. Anand obtained a passed pawn on d5 that was isolated but well defended, and Carlsen was under pressure for much of the game. Anand's temporary bishop sacrifice 28.Bxb7 allowed the d-pawn through to its queening square and so winning the piece back, but the resulting double rook endgame was equal and soon agreed drawn. Instead, 28.g3 was suggested as a way of keeping an advantage.

Grünfeld Defence, Russian System (ECO D97)
1. d4 Nf6 2. c4 g6 3. Nc3 d5 4. Nf3 Bg7 5. Qb3 dxc4 6. Qxc4 0-0 7. e4 Na6 8. Be2 c5 9. d5 e6 10. 0-0 exd5 11. exd5 Re8 12. Bg5 h6 13. Be3 Bf5 14. Rad1 Ne4 15. Nxe4 Bxe4 16. Qc1 Qf6 17. Bxh6 Qxb2 18. Qxb2 Bxb2 19. Ng5 Bd4 20. Nxe4 Rxe4 21. Bf3 Re7 22. d6 Rd7 23. Bf4 Nb4 24. Rd2 Re8 25. Rc1 Re6 26. h4 Be5 27. Bxe5 Rxe5 (diagram) 28. Bxb7 Rxb7 29. d7 Nc6 30. d8=Q+ Nxd8 31. Rxd8+ Kg7 32. Rd2 ½–½

=== Game 11, Carlsen–Anand, 1–0 ===
Carlsen–Anand, game 11

Position: a8 black rook, b8 black rook, f8 black bishop, c7 black pawn, f7 black pawn, c6 black king, e6 black bishop, f6 white knight, g6 black knight, h6 black pawn, a5 black pawn, c5 black pawn, d5 white knight, e5 white pawn, g5 black pawn, a4 white pawn, c4 white pawn, e4 white king, g4 white pawn, c3 white bishop, h3 white pawn, f2 white pawn, d1 white rook, e1 white rook

Position after 27.Ke4

The eleventh game was played on 23 November 2014. As in the seventh and ninth games, the opening resulted in the well-analyzed queenless middlegame of the Berlin Defence. In this game, Anand gained an initiative with the line opening pawn sacrifice 23...b5! Carlsen declined the sacrifice, but Anand still had a somewhat easier position until he sacrificed an exchange by 27...Rb4 in return for a protected passed pawn and free play for the bishops. Both players criticised this move afterwards, Anand describing it as "a bad gamble". Carlsen found a flaw in Black's plan and with 29.Nh5! followed by 30.f4 he opened up lines for the white rooks to penetrate on the d-file. After the capture of the black pawn on f7, the white pawn on e5 became a dangerous passed pawn. White's king was in position to block the black pawns while the white pawns proved unstoppable. Anand resigned on move 45, thus conceding the match and Carlsen retained the title of World Chess Champion.

Ruy Lopez, Berlin Defence (ECO C67)
1. e4 e5 2. Nf3 Nc6 3. Bb5 Nf6 4. 0-0 Nxe4 5. d4 Nd6 6. Bxc6 dxc6 7. dxe5 Nf5 8. Qxd8+ Kxd8 9. h3 Bd7 10. Nc3 h6 11. b3 Kc8 12. Bb2 c5 13. Rad1 b6 14. Rfe1 Be6 15. Nd5 g5 16. c4 Kb7 17. Kh2 a5 18. a4 Ne7 19. g4 Ng6 20. Kg3 Be7 21. Nd2 Rhd8 22. Ne4 Bf8 23. Nef6 b5 24. Bc3 bxa4 25. bxa4 Kc6 26. Kf3 Rdb8 27. Ke4 (diagram) Rb4 28. Bxb4 cxb4 29. Nh5 Kb7 30. f4 gxf4 31. Nhxf4 Nxf4 32. Nxf4 Bxc4 33. Rd7 Ra6 34. Nd5 Rc6 35. Rxf7 Bc5 36. Rxc7+ Rxc7 37. Nxc7 Kc6 38. Nb5 Bxb5 39. axb5+ Kxb5 40. e6 b3 41. Kd3 Be7 42. h4 a4 43. g5 hxg5 44. hxg5 a3 45. Kc3 1–0

== Timeline of changes ==
There were several changes and controversies in the process of selecting the challenger and hosts for the championship. A timeline is given below.

=== 2013 ===
- 25 August. Khanty-Mansiysk, Russia, announces its bid for the FIDE Candidates Tournament 2014.
- 5 October. FIDE deadline to bid for 2014 Candidates Tournament. Kozloduy, Bulgaria, requested an extension to the deadline until 12 October to provide a bank guarantee.
- 7 October. Kozloduy refused to bid for the 2014 Candidates Tournament.
- 22 October. FIDE announces that the 2014 Candidates Tournament will take place from 12 to 30 March 2014 in Khanty-Mansiysk, Russia.
- 22 November. Magnus Carlsen becomes World Chess Champion 2013 in Chennai, India and thus qualifies for the 2014 World Chess Championship match.

=== 2014 ===
- 10 January. FIDE announces procedure regulations for bidding to host the 2014 World Chess Championship match.
- 21 January. FIDE announces that all qualifiers for the Candidates Tournament 2014 in Khanty-Mansiysk have confirmed their participation and confirms the match schedule for the candidates matches.
- 10 March. FIDE closing date for bid process to host the 2014 World Chess Championship match.
- 11 March. FIDE extended the bidding deadline to 30 April 2014, 13:00 GMT.
- 29 March. Anand wins the Candidates tournament with one round to spare, and thus qualifies to the 2014 World Chess Championship match.
- 30 April. New closing date for bid process to host the 2014 World Chess Championship match. Due to absence of bidders FIDE announced to inform in due course.
- 10 May. Originally expected date for signature of the final contract with the successful bidder for the 2014 World Chess Championship match.
- 11 June. Announcement of Sochi, Russia, being the venue for the 2014 World Chess Championship match.
- 7 November. The 2014 World Chess Championship match opening ceremony. Anand is allocated the white pieces for game one by a random draw.
- 23 November. Carlsen defends his World Championship title.

== Analysis ==
Before the match began, many commentators believed that Carlsen had very strong chances of winning. However, many assumed that Anand had learned from his mistakes in 2013 and would be a stronger opponent this time around. These commentators were vindicated: Carlsen had to make a greater effort, winning the match with a ratio of wins to losses of 3:1 versus 3:0 in 2013. Commentators saw the match as more interesting precisely because Anand demonstrated himself as a much stronger player than he had done in 2013.

Overall, few doubted Carlsen's chances of winning, and Sergey Karjakin remarked that Anand was not in top form. Anand himself admitted that his key sacrifice in the final game was an unjustified risk, and that Carlsen had played better throughout the match.
