= 19th World Festival of Youth and Students =

2017 youth festival in Sochi, Russia

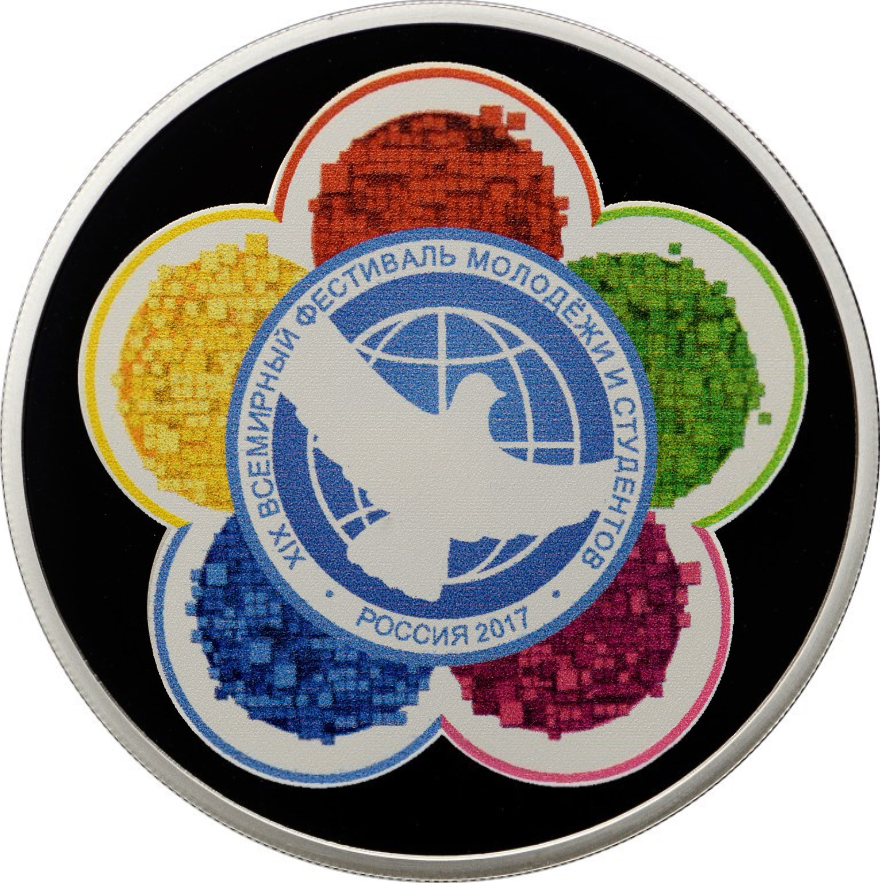
- Host country: Russia
- Date: October 14–22, 2017
- Motto: "For peace, solidarity and social justice, we are fighting against imperialism - respecting our past, we are building our future!"
- Cities: Sochi
- Participants: 20,000, from 180 countries
- Follows: 18th World Festival of Youth and Students

The 19th World Festival of Youth and Students (WFYS) was opened on October 14, 2017, in Sochi, Russia. The festival attracted 20,000 people from 180 countries.

== Organisation and events ==
The opening ceremony of the Festival was held in the arena of the Bolshoy Ice Dome in Sochi. The official slogan of the festival is "For peace, solidarity and social justice, we are fighting against imperialism - respecting our past, we are building our future!".

Russian President Vladimir Putin attended the All-Russian Youth Educational Forum criticizing the coverage of the festival saying that "it is necessary to avoid politicizing the festival and devote it to young people".

== See also ==
- World Festival of Youth and Students
- World Federation of Democratic Youth
