= Federal territory =

Area under the direct control of the national government

A federal territory is an administrative division under the direct and usually exclusive jurisdiction of a federation's national government. A federal territory is a part of a federation, but not a part of any federated state. The states constitute the federation itself and share sovereignty with the federal government, while a territory does not have sovereign status and is constitutionally dependent on the federal government.

== Federal territories in various federations ==
- Australia (Note: All internal and external territories where federal laws are implemented.)
  - Ashmore and Cartier Islands (external)
  - Australian Antarctic Territory (claimed)
  - Australian Capital Territory (internal)
  - Christmas Island (external)
  - Cocos (Keeling) Islands (external)
  - Coral Sea Islands (external)
  - Heard Island and McDonald Islands (external)
  - Jervis Bay Territory (internal)
  - Norfolk Island (external)
  - Northern Territory (internal)
- Canada
  - Northwest Territories
  - Nunavut
  - Yukon
- India (Note: Formally known as the union territories.)
  - Andaman and Nicobar Islands
  - Chandigarh
  - Dadra and Nagar Haveli and Daman and Diu
  - Jammu and Kashmir
  - Ladakh
  - Lakshadweep
  - National Capital Territory of Delhi
  - Puducherry
- Malaysia
  - Kuala Lumpur
  - Labuan
  - Putrajaya
- Nigeria
  - Federal Capital Territory (Abuja)
- Pakistan
  - Islamabad Capital Territory (Islamabad)
- Russia
  - Sirius
- United States
  - American Samoa (unincorporated unorganized)
  - Bajo Nuevo Bank (claimed)
  - Baker Island (unincorporated unorganized)
  - Guam (unincorporated organized)
  - Howland Island (unincorporated unorganized)
  - Jarvis Island (unincorporated unorganized)
  - Johnston Atoll (unincorporated unorganized)
  - Kingman Reef (unincorporated unorganized)
  - Midway Atoll (unincorporated unorganized)
  - Navassa Island (unincorporated unorganized)
  - Northern Mariana Islands (unincorporated organized)
  - Palmyra Atoll (incorporated unorganized)
  - Puerto Rico (unincorporated organized)
  - Serranilla Bank (claimed)
  - U.S. Virgin Islands (unincorporated organized)
  - Wake Island (unincorporated unorganized)

== Historical federal territories ==
=== Brazil ===
In Brazil, although mentioned in the Federal Constitution, currently there are no federal territories. Brazil had three territories until the adoption of the 1988 Constitution: Fernando de Noronha (today a state district of Pernambuco), Amapá, and Roraima, now fully recognised states. From 1943 to 1982, Rondônia was also a federal territory (until 1956 under the name of Território do Guaporé).

=== Canada ===
The Northwest Territories used to include a majority of what is now Canada, and was divided into districts for ease of administration from 1882 until 1999. One such district, Keewatin, was its own federal territory from 1876 until 1905.

=== Germany ===
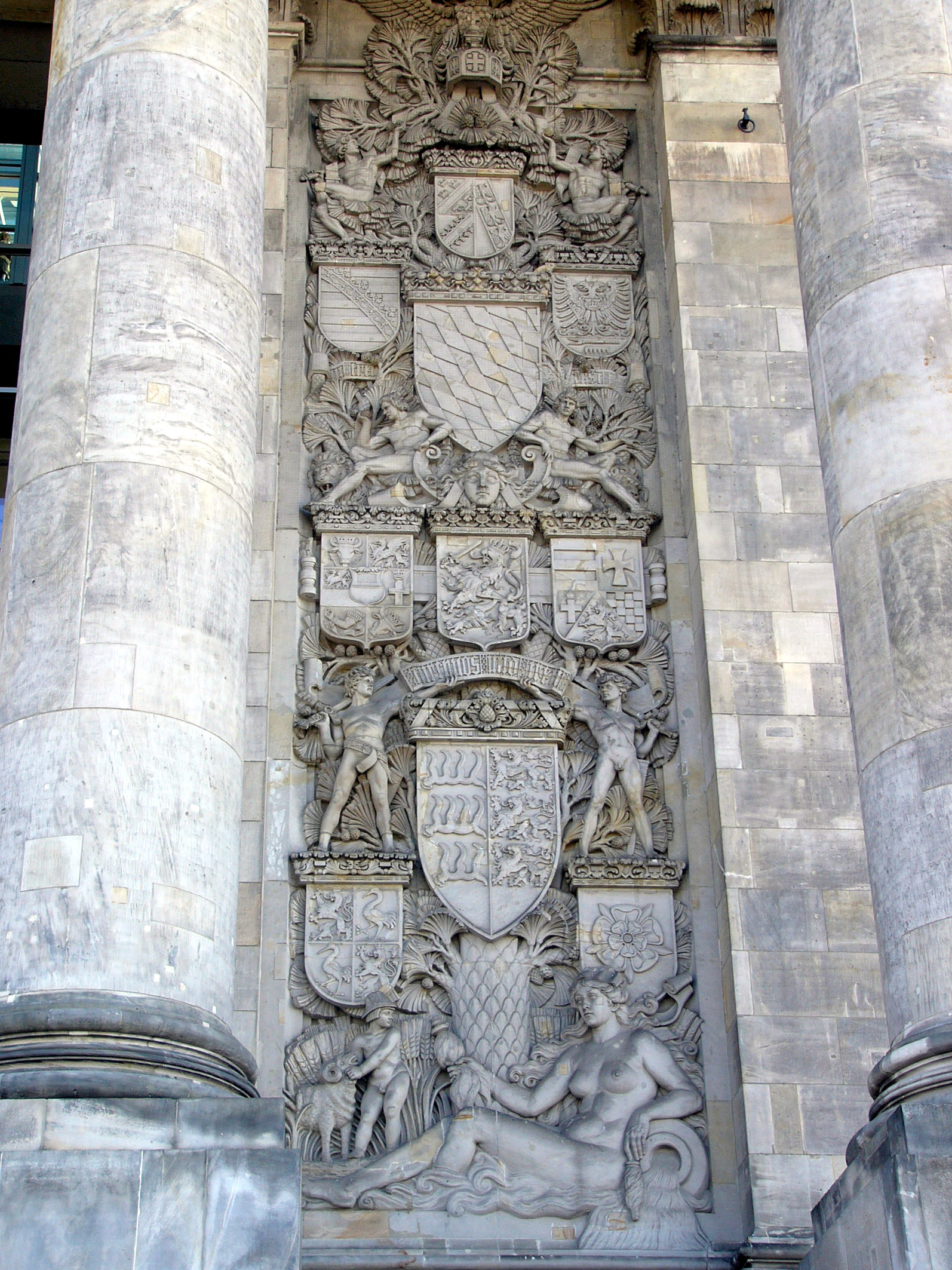
Alsace-Lorraine's coat of arms can still be seen on the Reichstag building in Berlin (at the very top), together with the coat of arms of the other states.

The German Empire was a federation of monarchies and a few city-states. However, after the Franco-Prussian War, the newly created country annexed large parts of Alsace and Lorraine, two mostly German-speaking French territories which used to belong to the Holy Roman Empire. A large part of the local population was opposed to the transfer, meaning that granting statehood to the recently acquired territory would establish a state with a possible desire for secession which also was not used to German politics and German law. Incorporating the territory into Prussia, as happened to Schleswig-Holstein and other states during the German Unification Wars, was opposed by the South German states which already felt diminished by Prussia. Hence, an annexation to Bavaria and Baden was also discussed, yet met with opposition by the military which opined that the crucial border territory had to be governed from Berlin. As a compromise, Otto von Bismarck successfully proposed to incorporate Alsace-Lorraine as a territory directly governed by the Imperial (federal) government, leading to the creation of the Imperial Territory of Alsace-Lorraine (Reichsland Elsaß-Lothringen). The territorial status, common in the US, was unique within mainland Germany, as all constituent states were self-governing. In 1911 the Constitution of the German Empire was amended to treat Alsace-Lorraine as a state for certain matters, including its own government and votes in the Bundestag.

France annexed the complete area after World War I. Since then, the German national government never had direct control over a German territory, with the exception of the Nazi government; however, Nazi Germany was - like East Germany - a centralized state where state governments were de facto abolished. The Federal Republic of Germany's Basic Law does not currently provide a legal way to create a federal territory, including a capital district, and describes the German national territory as being composed solely of states.

=== United States ===
In the United States, many of the states were territories or parts of territories before reaching statehood, e.g. Louisiana Territory, Mississippi Territory, Oregon Territory, Alaska Territory and Hawaii Territory. Before reaching statehood, these territories of the United States were formally usually of a kind which can be described as "organized incorporated territories", meaning that the government of the jurisdiction was formally organized in such a way as to comply with recognized federal standards for self-government, and that the jurisdiction was "organic" to the United States, that is, an irrevocably inseverable part of it rather than a protectorate, an area leased from and still pertaining formally to another nation, or a concession granted by another nation or group which conceivably could retain certain rights to it. "Incorporated" territories are a part of the United States, though not of any particular constituent state, and as such are not readily saleable or cessionable to other powers in the way that "unincorporated" territories are.
