= Bolshoy Ice Dome =

Multi-purpose arena in Sochi, Russia

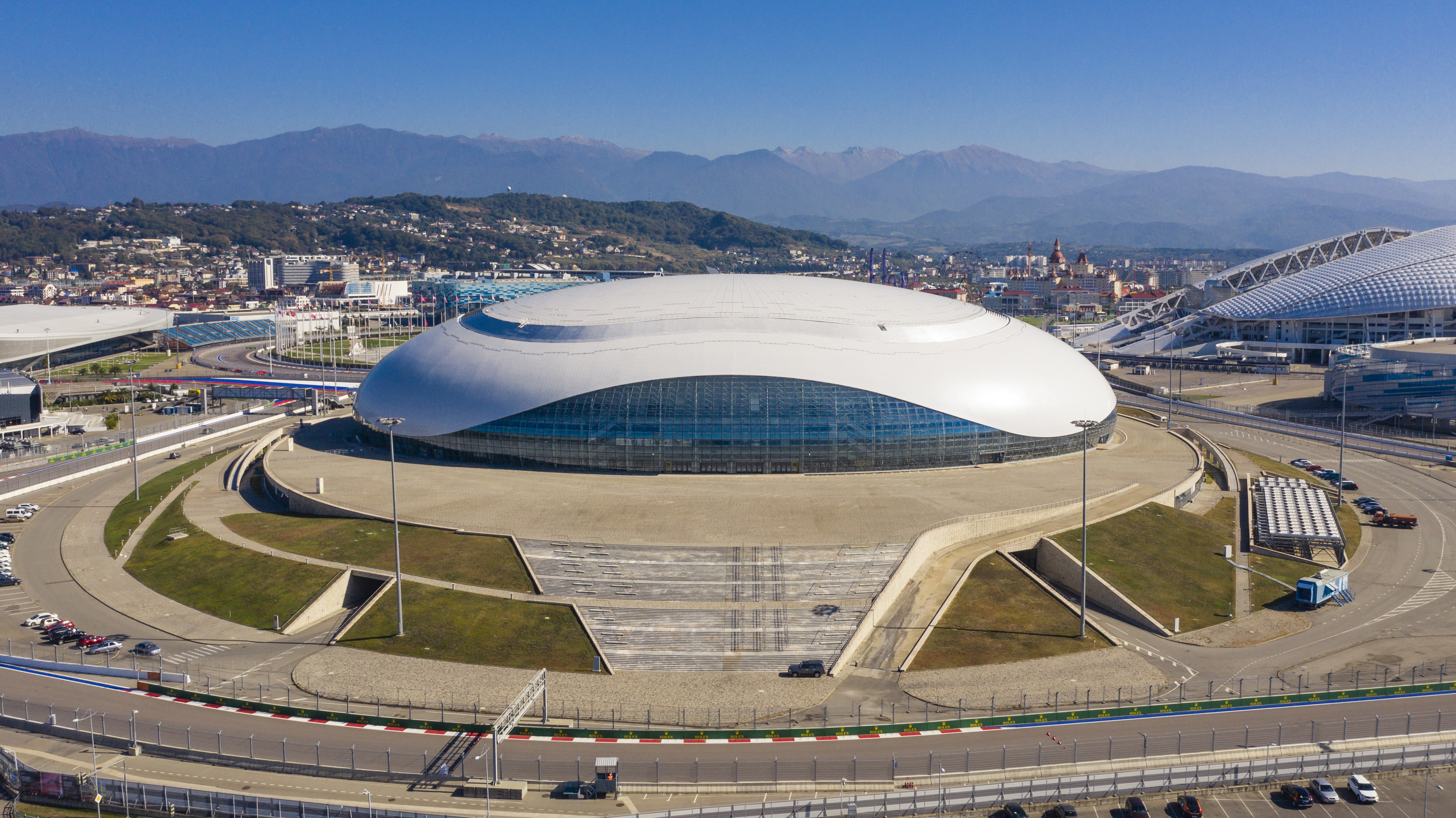
- Interactive map of Bolshoy Ice Dome
- Location: Sochi, Russia
- Coordinates: 43°24′16″N 39°57′00″E
- Operator: International Ice Hockey Federation
- Capacity: 12,035

Construction
- Opened: 2013
- Cost: US$300 million / RUB 9.9 billion

Tenants
- HC Sochi (2014-); 2014 Winter Olympics; 2013 IIHF World U18 Championships; 2013 Channel One Cup

The Bolshoy Ice Dome (Russian: Большой Ледовый дворец) is a multi-purpose indoor arena located in Olympic Park, Sochi, Russia. Opened in 2012, the 12,000-seat arena was primarily constructed to host hockey competitions during the 2014 Winter Olympics. Following the Games, it became the home arena of HC Sochi, an expansion team of the KHL. The arena has also hosted concerts and other events. Prior to the Games, the arena hosted the IIHF World U18 Championships and Channel One Cup in 2013.

The arena's exterior is distinguished by its LED-illuminated roof, which its designers described as resembling fabergé eggs and frozen water droplets.

== Name and location ==
The arena was named "Bolshoy", meaning "big", "large" and "huge" in Russian. This highlights the integral role of ice hockey at the Olympics, which has been dubbed "the most popular sport" of the Games by the organizers themselves. Furthermore, the name was chosen due to its universal familiarity in other countries, in addition to its allusion to the Bolshoi Theatre, Bolshoi Ballet, and other great Russian accomplishments.

The Ice Dome was situated in the Coastal Cluster zone of venues for the 2014 Winter Olympics. It served as the main arena for the men and women's ice hockey tournament throughout the Games. It is the only venue in the Olympic Park located on top of a hill, and is less than 1,000 feet (300 m) away from Shayba Arena, which was the secondary ice hockey venue that hosted mainly preliminary round matches.

== Structure and facilities ==
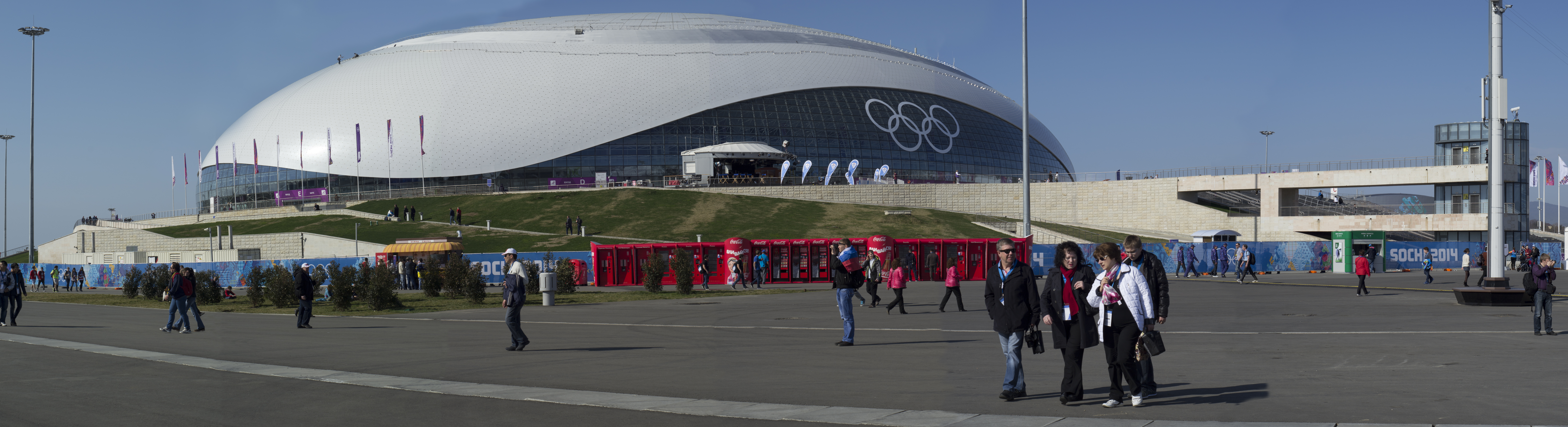
Exterior of the Bolshoy Ice Dome

The construction of the Bolshoy Ice Dome started in 2009 and finished in 2012. It was designed by architect firm Mostovik and completed at a cost of approximately US$180 million, although ITAR-TASS estimated the cost to be as high as $300 million. A total of 20 architects and 70 engineers – headed by Andrey Ustinov – were responsible for the construction of the arena.

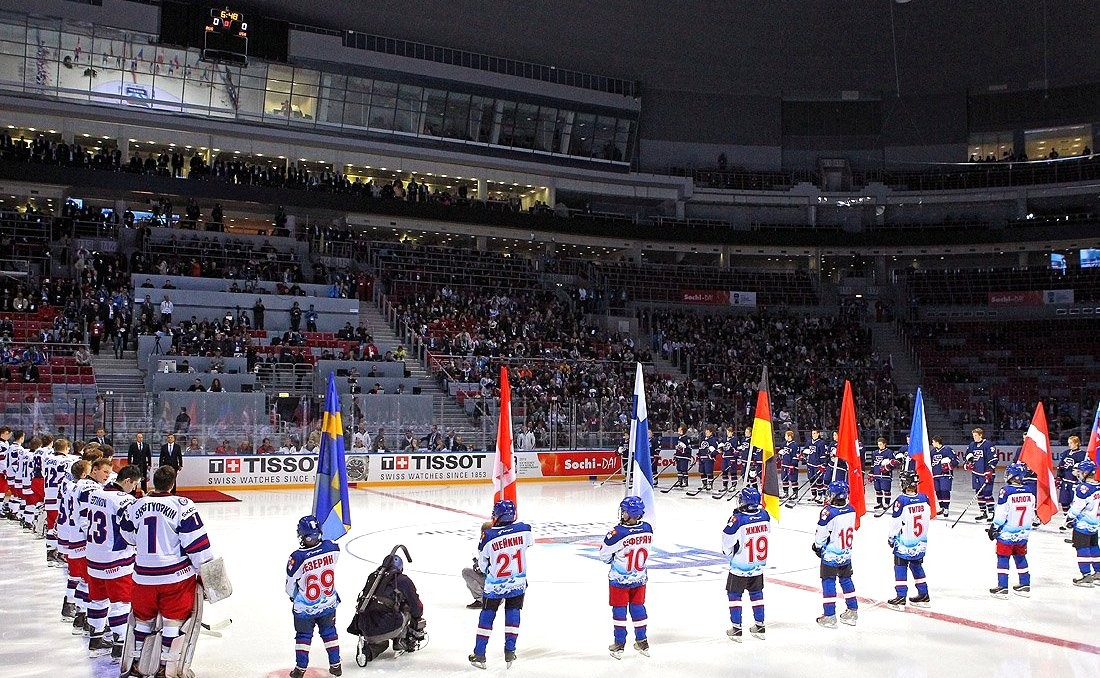
The interior of the arena during the 2013 IIHF World U18 Championships opening ceremony

The exterior structure of the Ice Dome was designed to resemble a frozen ice droplet. It has also drawn comparisons to a Fabergé egg, due to the light-emitting diodes (LEDs) resembling the "jewel-encrusted surface" of the famous Russian art piece. Ustinov confirmed that the building was designed to be "a combination of both." The roof of the dome is mostly silver in colour and is covered with aluminium panels. It is decorated with 38,000 LED lights which illuminate the outside of the arena at night. The roof also doubles as a scoreboard that displays the live score of the game being played inside and an animation of a hockey puck whenever a goal is scored. However, it famously did not display the final score after the United States defeated the hosts Russia 3–2 in an overtime shootout during the 2014 Winter Olympics.

In the arena's interior, the 12,000 seats are arranged in bowl-like configuration. The concourse features 35,000 square feet (3,300 m^{2}) of glazed glass, which enables spectators to have a view of the Caucasus Mountains. The hockey rink's dimensions are 60 metres (200 ft) × 30 metres (98 ft), in line with the International Ice Hockey Federation (IIHF) specifications. This contrasts with the dimensions of the previous Olympics, which utilized National Hockey League (NHL) sized rinks that are 4 metres (13 ft) narrower in width. It contains 12 dressing rooms for players, an entry tunnel that can be accessed by large vehicles, and a practice ice rink. Moreover, the Ice Dome uses heat transfer fluids on the ice and in the air conditioning system. This helps to preserve the quality of the ice, as well as moderate the temperature within the arena so that spectators are kept warm while maintaining the coolness of the ice. These technologies – along with the arena's insulation – were developed by the Dow Chemical Company, one of the official sponsors of the Olympic Games.

== Events ==
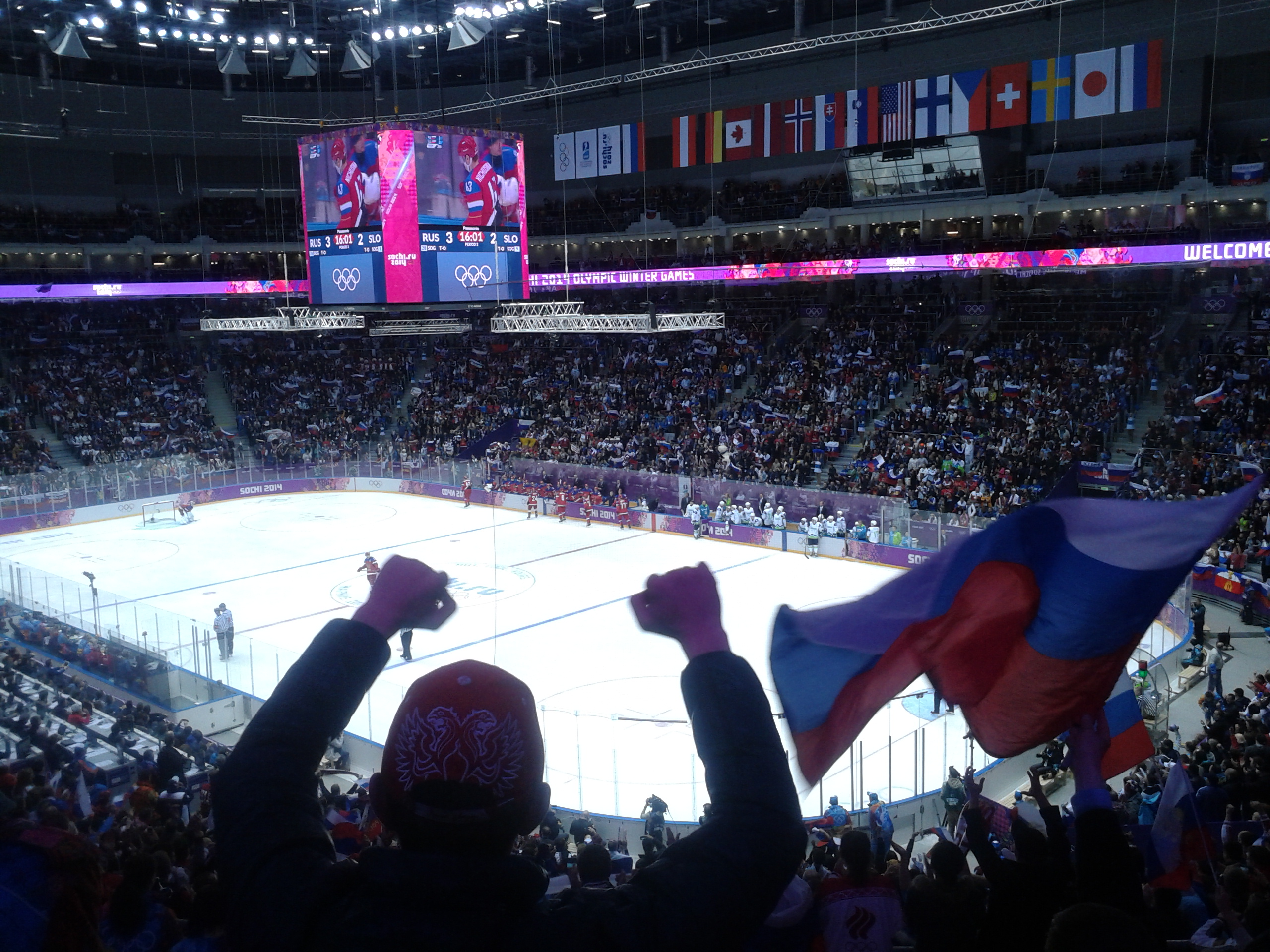
Preliminary round match between Russia and Slovenia during the men's ice hockey tournament of the 2014 Winter Olympics.

In order to test the arenas built for the Olympics, the Bolshoy Ice Dome served as one of the venues for the 2013 IIHF World U18 Championships. It subsequently held the Channel One Cup from 19–22 December 2013 in final preparation before the start of the Games. As the main venue for the 2014 Olympic ice hockey competition, the Ice Dome hosted most of the preliminary round games and almost all the playoff round matches for the men's tournament, while hosting solely the medal matches of the women's tournament. On February 20, it held the gold medal match for the women's tournament, which saw Canada overcome a 0–2 deficit against the United States to tie the game with less than a minute of regulation time remaining, before scoring in overtime to secure their fourth consecutive Olympic gold medal. The arena hosted the gold medal game of the men's tournament three days later on 23 February – the final gold medal of the 2014 Games up for contention – in which Canada defeated Sweden by a score of 3–0. In doing so, the Canadian team won an Olympic gold medal outside of North America for the first time in 62 years, became the first team since the Soviet Union in 1984 to finish the tournament with a perfect record, the first team to successfully defend their gold medal since the Soviets in 1988, and the first to do both with the participation of NHL players, which started in 1998.

The venue hosted the 2015 Kontinental Hockey League All-Star Game. The arena also hosted the first edition of the VTB United Basketball League All-Star Game.

== After the Olympics ==
After the conclusion of the Olympics, the arena continue to host a variety of sports, in addition to becoming an entertainment centre and concert venue. The arena now hosts HC Sochi, a KHL expansion team.

== See also ==
- List of indoor arenas in Russia
