= Imereti Lowlands =

Coordinates: 43°24′28″N 39°57′37″E

The Imereti Lowlands (Georgian: იმერეთის დაბლობი, Russian: Имеретинская низменность) is located in western Georgia and continues on the coast of the Black Sea between the Mzymta and Psou rivers in the Krasnodar Krai, Russia. It meets the sea in the Adler district of Sochi city.

The name derives from the Georgian region of Imereti.

The Imereti Lowlands was an important bird area protected since 1911, most of which was destroyed during the construction of the Coastal cluster of the 2014 Winter Olympic Games. The project included hotel complexes that would have a combined total of 5,600 rooms. The largest of these hotels was built on 36 hectares in the Imereti Lowlands. The Lowlands would also have a four-star, 700-room hotel for dignitaries and guests attending the Games.

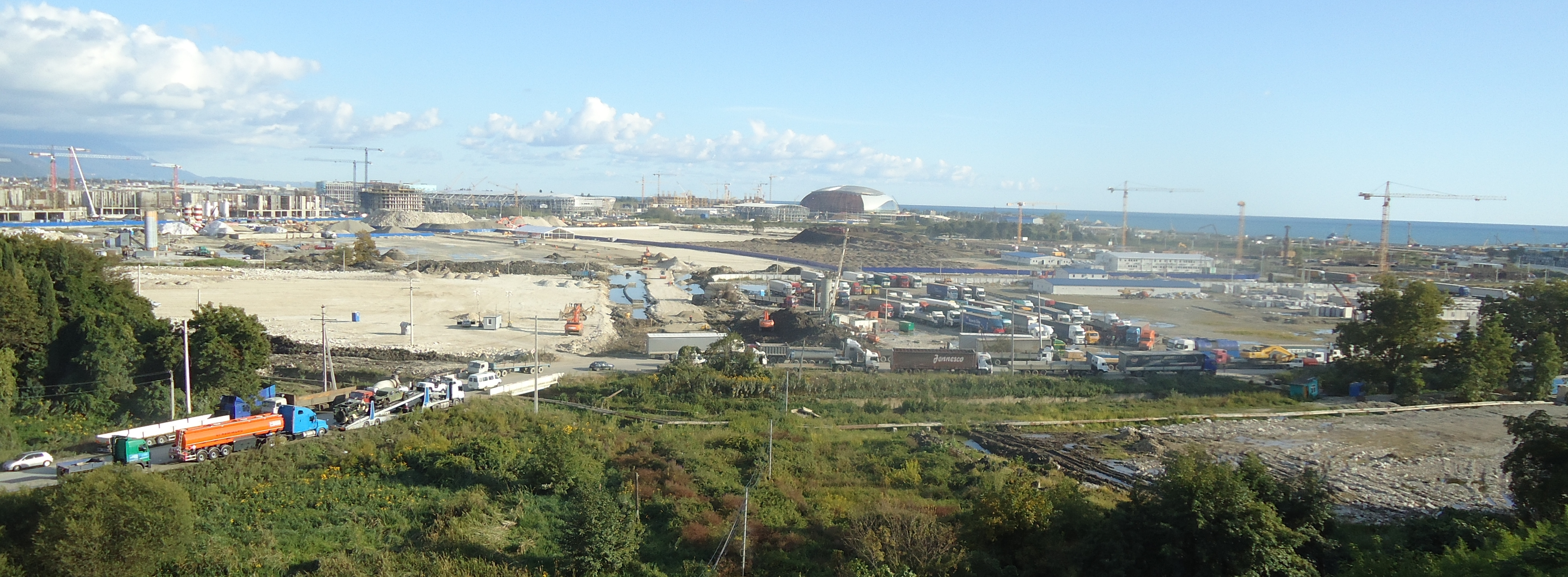
Imereti Lowlands, October 2011 during the construction of the coastal cluster for the 2014 Winter Olympics

An ornithological park was officially created on approximately 300 hectares of lands left unoccupied by the olympic infrastructure, but most of the land was inadequate for this purpose.
