= Ki mit tud? =

Hungarian television talent show

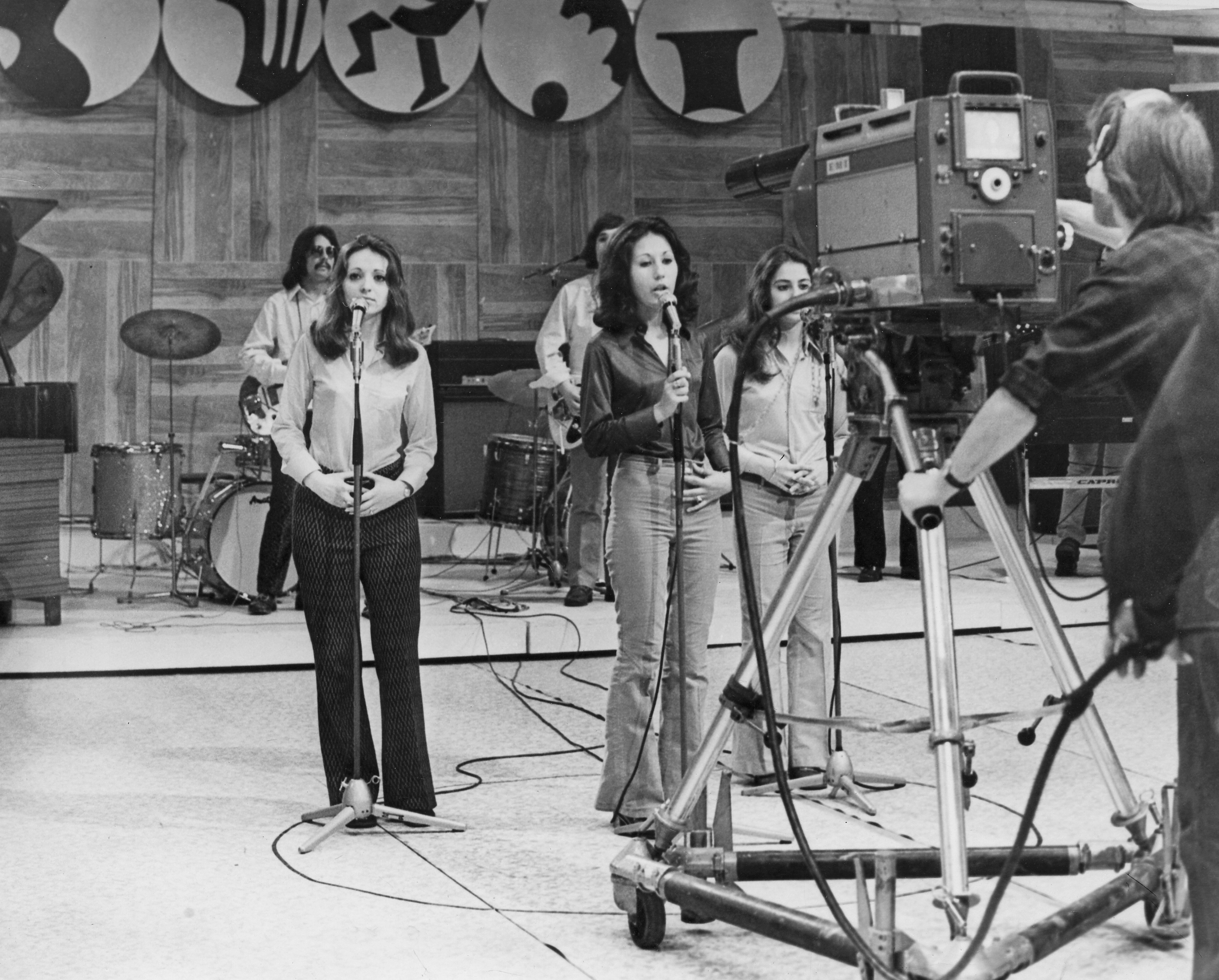
- Ki mit tud? recording in 1972
- Hungarian: Ki mit tud?
- Genre: Talent contest
- Created by: József Békés; Miklós Karácsondi
- Directed by: Lajos Pauló (1962–1972); Ferenc Kökényessy (1977); Miklós Csányi (1983); Tibor Vadkerti (1988); Sándor Szőnyi G. (1993); Ágnes Csenterics (1996)
- Presented by: Győző Horváth (1962); Károly Megyeri (1962–1972); János Horvát (1977); János Gálvölgyi (1983); Imre Antal (1988–1996)
- Judges: Emil Petrovics; Miklós Szinetár; Tamás Major; András Pernye; Sándor Benkó; Miklós Rábai; László Vásárhelyi; Endre Jeszenszky
- Country of origin: Hungary
- Original language: Hungarian
- No. of seasons: 10

Production
- Production company: Magyar Televízió

Original release
- Network: Magyar Televízió
- Release: February 13, 1962 – November 16, 1996

Ki mit tud? (Hungarian pronunciation: [ˈki ˈmit ˈtud], literally "Who knows what?") was a multi-genre talent show on the Hungarian National Television spanning 10 seasons between 1962 and 1996. Achieving great popularity in the 1960s, Ki mit tud? helped to launch the career of many artists who later became household names in the country, including actors like János Gálvölgyi or András Kern, singers like Kati Kovács, Zsuzsa Koncz, Judith Szűcs or Zorán Sztevanovity, and bands like Hungária, Metro or Pokolgép.

== Concept ==
Ki mit tud? was originally conceived as a country-wide talent search, with contestants coming from city-, county-, and finally - the televised, live - country-wide finals. A wide array of genres were judged separately, covering nearly all fields of performing arts: vocal music (including pop, rock, opera, folk), instrumental music (including classical, jazz, dance, pop and rock), verse reading, folk and contemporary dance, and "other" genres (including circus productions, magic shows, stand-up comedy, pantomime or puppetry). The 1988 contest also welcomed amateur film submissions. The jury usually included a number of well-known faces from the country's theatric and music and art scene. Prizes ranged from common household wares to a trip to the next World Festival of Youth, or after the 1980s, luxury trips to exotic countries.

== Series overview ==
Year	No. of episodes	Date of premier	Date of the final(s)		Notable performers	Host	President of the Jury	Trip for category winners
1962	11	13 February 1962	24 June 1962		Béla Bakacsi, Tamás Hacki, Zsuzsa Koncz, Sándor Benkó, András Kern, Metró band	Győző Horváth	Béla Szabó	8th World Festival of Youth and Students in Helsinki
1962-63	18	20 October 1962	7 July 1963		Zorán Sztevanovity, Gyöngyi Keveházi pianist, Géza Molnár Szegedi parodist, Kék Csillag band, Expressz band	Károly Megyeri	Béla Szabó	Circular tour in the Soviet Union
1965	13	4 April 1965	10 June 1965	12 June 1965	Kati Kovács, Anikó Ungár, Mária Zádori singer, Bóbita puppeteers, Teri Harangozó, Kolos Kováts opera singer	Károly Megyeri	László Orosz	Circular tour (including Moscow, Leningrad, Helsinki, Stockholm and East Berlin)
1968	10	25 April 1968	23 June 1968	29 June 1968	Tolcsvai-trio pol-beat band, András Schiff, Veronika Kincses opera singer, Hungária band, János Gálvölgyi, Neoton, Rangers band	Károly Megyeri	Tamás Major	9th World Festival of Youth and Students in Sofia
1972	13	4 May 1972	29 June 1972	8 July 1972	Generál band, Judith Szűcs singer, Béla Berki lead violinist, Mikrolied vocal-trio and Lajos Boros, Gábor Forgács, Viktória Eszményi (all singers)	Károly Megyeri	Tamás Major	Circular tour in Yugoslavia and Northern Italy
1977	10	4 February 1977	4 April 1977		Color band, Frigyes Pleszkán jazzpianist, Gúnya parody duo, Vujicsis folk dance group, Kis Rákfogó band, Csaba Szögi folk dancer, Anna Kubik	János Horvát	Tamás Major	Circular tour (Warsaw, Leningrad and Helsinki cities were included)
1983	9	20 May 1983	24 July 1983		Mariann Falusi jazz-singer, Studium Dixieland Band, Tamás Ghyczy magician, Csaba Forrás juggling artist, Szélkiáltó folk band, Kati Farkas jazz ballerina, Andrea Rost soprano, Pokolgép	János Gálvölgyi	Tamás Major	Circular tour to Cuba
1988	9	27 July 1988	17 September 1988		Tamás Jónás magician, Los Andinos folk band, Swetter folk-rock band, Ernő Fekete, Artúr Kálid	Imre Antal	Miklós Szinetár	Circular tour to Egypt
1993	12	1 July 1993	18 September 1993		Enemy Squad breakdance group, János Varga, Roland Rába	Imre Antal	Mihály Czine	Circular tour to Thailand
1996	12	28 August 1996	16 November 1996		Veronika Nádasi, Peta Lukács, Csanád Gergely Kováts dancer, Anna Herczenik opera singer, Ödön Rácz double bass player, Mónika Lakatos gypsy folk singer, Savaria Singers choir	Imre Antal	Péter Huszti	Circular tour to Mexico

== Importance ==
Ki mit tud? presented a premier chance for performers of all genres to showcase their talents in front of a wider audience - similar to what Táncdalfesztivál meant for musicians.

During the 1960s–1970s, Ki mit tud? became the most-viewed show on National Television. According to the rudimentary statistics of the time, the finals were viewed by 88% of the population. Utilizing regional quarter- and semi-finals, the contest mobilized a large number of participants. 1965's show had 28,642 registered contestants performing in 7842 shows, watched by a live audience totaling to 180,000.

The contest rounds in cities and counties established a country-wide tradition of institutional (e.g. schoolwide) and regional talent contests, with similar events called Ki mit tud? held frequently even today.

== Sources ==
- István, Kollega Tarsoly. A magyar televíziózás műfajai, Vetélkedők Magyarországon a XX. században III. - Kultúra, művészet, sport és szórakozás. Szekszárd : Babits Kiadó, 1998. ISBN 9789639015708
- Hogy volt?!... - Ki mit tud?-ok (in Hungarian). National Audio-visual Archive.
