= Dollybirds =

- Directed by: Péter Tímár
- Starring: János Gálvölgyi; Sándor Almási
- Release date: 20 February 1997
- Running time: 1mh 40 minutes
- Country: Hungary
- Language: Hungarian

Dollybirds (Hungarian: Csinibaba) is a 1997 Hungarian comedy musical film directed by Péter Tímár. and written by Gyula Márton and Péter Tímár.

== Synopsis ==
In the August 1962, the Hungarian Young Communist League announces that the winner of the annual Ki mit tud? talent show will earn a trip to the 8th World Festival of Youth and Students in Helsinki; sensing a chance to defect communist Hungary, Attila decides to win the contest by putting a band together. With varying levels of support from the local residents, he assembles a ragtag band, and enters the contest. They reach the finals, but before they'd get a chance to perform on stage, an encounter with a stagehand reveals to them that the contest is fixed and that the winners have already been picked; the band sadly departs without ever going on stage.

== Cast ==
- János Gálvölgyi – Uncle Simon
- Sándor Almási – Attila
- Anita Tóth – Angéla
- Gábor Reviczky – Cézár
- Éva Igó – Margit
- Ildikó Tóth – Olga

== Production ==
Like Sound Eroticism, Tímár applied unusual filming techniques: he recorded the actors reciting the dialogue first, which he'd then either slow down or speed up and replay during shooting, making the actors act out the scenes either faster or slower than their natural tempo.
