= 12th World Festival of Youth and Students =

1985 youth festival in Moscow, Soviet Union

- Host country: Soviet Union
- Dates: 27 July - 3 August 1985
- Motto: For Anti-Imperialist Solidarity, Peace and Friendship
- Cities: Moscow
- Participants: 26,000 people from 157 countries
- Follows: 11th World Festival of Youth and Students
- Precedes: 13th World Festival of Youth and Students

The 12th World Festival of Youth and Students was held from 27 July to 3 August 1985 in Moscow, capital city of Soviet Union. The festival was attended by 26,000 people from 157 countries. The slogan of the festival was "For anti-imperialist solidarity, peace and friendship".

== Objective ==
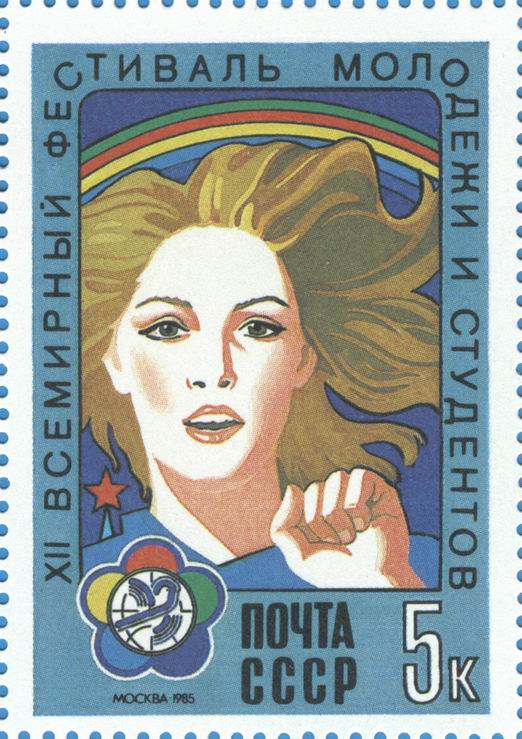
Soviet 5 Kopek postage stamp, 1985

The political goal of the festival was to show positive aspects of life in Soviet society. The political program of the festival included the establishment of a new international economic order, discussion of the problems of economic assistance to backward and developing countries, combating poverty and unemployment, and raising environmental issues. Anti-Soviet elements, just as before the 1980 Summer Olympics, were expelled from Moscow before the opening of the festival.

== Events ==
The main organizer of the festival events was the Soviet Preparatory Committee, chaired by Vladimir Fedosov, secretary of the Central Committee of the Komsomol.

The Komsomol relied heavily on the infrastructure of the Moscow 1980 Summer Olympics for the festival venues, including the Luzhniki Olympic Complex and the Cosmos Hotel, which accommodated 3,000 foreign participants. The opening of the festival took place at a four hour parade and ceremony at Luzhniki stadium and was broadcast live on Soviet television. The festival was opened with a welcome speech from the newly-elected General Secretary of the CPSU Central Committee, Mikhail Gorbachev:

Here, in the homeland of the great Lenin, you can directly feel how deeply our young people are devoted to the noble ideals of humanity, peace and socialism. I think we all agree that there is no more important and urgent task for humanity today than saving and strengthening peace. To this we are bound by the concern for the future and the memory of the past. Your forum takes place in the year of the 40th anniversary of the defeat of Hitler's fascism and Japanese militarism, the end of the Second World War - the most bloody and brutal war. After it there was so much suffering and grief, affecting the lives of several generations - it urgently demands that we prevent the recurrence of such a disaster.

The festival included an exhibition of young artists, a photo exhibition, and concerts by amateur and ethnic groups, as well as professional performers from the socialist states such as such as Alla Pugacheva, Valery Leontiev, Anne Veski, Irina Otieva, Sofia Rotaru, Mikhail Boyarsky, Zhanna Bichevskaya, Igor Sklyar, Yuri Antonov, Viktor Reznikov, Nadezhda Chepraga, The Leningrad Concert Orchestra, Zemlyane, Mashina Vremeni, Tsvety, Integral, Dean Reed, Karel Gott, Biser Kirov, Bajaga i Instruktori, Elán, Bijelo Dugme and Western musicians Bob Dylan, Udo Lindenberg, and Everything but the Girl. "Waltz of Silence", a song by Yuri Livshits, was the final melody of the festival.

== Commemorative Merchandise ==
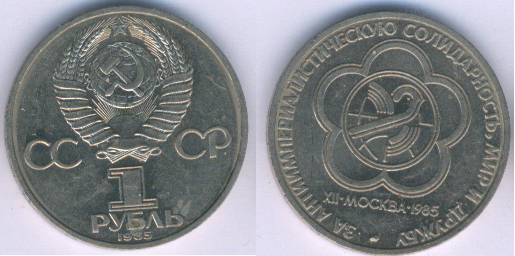
USSR Commemorative Coin for the 1985 World Festival

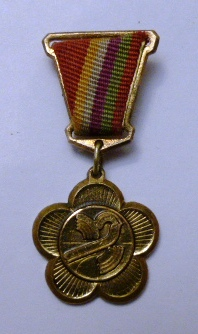
Medal for active participation in the preparation and conduct of the XII World Festival of Youth and Students)

Before the festival, posters, postage stamps with festival symbols, a commemorative coin were issued and a special promotional campaign was held by the Soviet state lottery. The poster and symbols of the festival were approved by the Central Committee of the CPSU.

The emblem of the festival was chosen as a result of a competition in 1984 in which more than 200 professional artists from different countries took part. The winning designer of the festival's emblem was People's Artist of Ukraine Rafael Zeynurovich Masautov. The emblem was used in more than 80 countries. In the USSR the emblem of the festival, at the order of the Council of Ministers of the USSR, was used to produce more than 7,000 souvenir items. The emblem brought the USSR a net profit of 450,000,000 Soviet rubles (through surcharges for products with festival symbols).

"Katyusha", the mascot of the festival, was conceived by Soviet artist Vyacheslav Yermakov, photographer Yuri Alekseevich Zharov and artist Ekaterina Afanasyevna Dunaeva, who was also depicted on the official poster of the festival for the Central Committee of the CPSU youth publication "Plakat". "Katyusha" was sketched by Mikhail Veremenko, an artist from Moscow.

At the first meeting of the International Preparatory Committee of the XIX World Festival of Youth and Students of 2017, which was held in Sochi, Russia, the logo of the event was chosen to be an updated version of the logos of the two previous Moscow world festivals of youth and students in 1957 and 1985.

== See also ==
- World Festival of Youth and Students
- Russian Soviet Federative Socialist Republic (RSFSR)
- Komsomol
- International University Sports Festival
