= Cloud Above the River Ganges =

2002 Hungarian drama film

Felhő a Gangesz felett
- Directed by: Gábor Dettre
- Written by: Gábor Dettre
- Produced by: Sándor Simó; Andrea Kormos; Jenő Hábermann
- Starring: Zoltán Ternyák; Ildikó Tóth; Lajos Kovács; Anikó Sáfár; Miklós B. Székely; Ferenc Borbiczki
- Cinematography: Ferenc Pap
- Edited by: Gabriella Koncz
- Production companies: Film-Art Studio; Hunnia Filmgyár; Magyar Televízió
- Release date: 2002
- Running time: 142 minutes
- Country: Hungary
- Language: Hungarian

Cloud Above the River Ganges (a.k.a. Cloud Over the Ganges, original title: Felhő a Gangesz felett) is a 2002 Hungarian drama film directed by Gábor Dettre, who also wrote the screenplay.

== Cast ==
- Zoltán Ternyák as András
- Ildikó Tóth as Juli
- Anikó Sáfár as András's mother
- Miklós B. Székely as Juli's father
- Ferenc Borbiczki as Juli's husband
- Ádám Rajhona as the doctor
- Lajos Kovács as a neighbour
- Lili Monori as a neighbour
- Erzsi Pápai as a neighbour

== Plot ==
András is a gifted computer programmer who has been a heroin addict for years. He dreams of travelling to India, to the banks of the Ganges. One day in Budapest he meets Juli, a struggling actress who has just left her husband and children. She agrees to help him quit cold turkey, and the two shut themselves in András’s flat for weeks. They go through brutal withdrawal, physical pain, panic and despair, and they fall in love along the way. When he finally comes through it, they decide to fulfil his dream and travel to India.

== Awards ==
In Hungary, the film won two Television and Film Critics Awards, as well as the best actor and best actress awards of the country's leading film magazine, and several audience awards in similar categories.

Abroad, it received the Cinecittà Award and the City of Rome Award. Its most prestigious distinction was a European Film Academy nomination in the categories Best European Film and Best European Director.
