= Jatari Indian Folk Association =

Hungarian musical group exploring South American indigenous music

The Jatari Indian Folk Association is a Hungarian musical group aims to explore and collect the folk traditions such as folk music, folk and sacral dances, national costume, folk instruments, legends, folk tales, Catholic liturgical and Gregorian tunes of Andean cultures of South America. The outcomes of this collecting work are represented in the frame of lectures, photo and folk exhibitions and music and dance shows.

== Name ==
The meaning of the word jatari is ‘wake up’. It originates from Quichua language of Ecuador.

== History ==
The Jatari Indian Folk Group was formed on 2 October 1992, in Mezőkövesd, Hungary with 18 members. Its founder was László Koncz who firstly took part in a Hungarian folk dance group but afterward he turn to Indian culture. In 1993 the Jatari Indian Folk Group was introduced to the whole country by participating in Ki mit tud?, a talent show broadcast on the Hungarian Television.

In 1994 the Jatari Indian Folk Group became Jatari Indian Folk Association that aimed Hungarian (and other) people familiarise with the Indian folk culture and this based on authentic sources. This work was advocated by consulates of South American countries, Indians, who originates from Andes but living in Hungary, photographers, archaeologists, anthropologists and folk musicians. As appreciation of his work, László Koncz was given the nickname ‘Mamani’ what means ‘hawk’ by local Indians in Andes.

== Fieldworks ==
- 1994 – In the Gate of Sun. Expedition to Ecuador.
- 2000 – In the Gate of Sun 2. Expedition to Ecuador and Peru
- 2001 – In the Gate of Sun 3. Expedition to Peru, to ‘Bearmen’
- 2004 – In the Gate of Sun. Expedition to Bolivia and Peru
- 2008 – Expedition to Ecuador

== Albums of Jatari Indian Folk Group ==
- Ayarachis CD (2006)
- Ayarachis DVD (2006)

== Exhibitions, lectures, show ==
=== International Folk Dance Festivals ===
- 1993 – Mezőkövesd
- 1993 – Eger: Jatari-Los Andinos
- 1993 – ‘Gold Shall’ Festival – Siófok
- 1994 – Mezőkövesd
- 1995 – Mezőkövesd
- 1996 – ‘Gold Shall’ Festival – Siófok
- 1996 – Mezőkövesd
- 1997 – Mezőkövesd
- 1998 – Mezőkövesd
- 1999 – Győr
- 1999 – Mezőkövesd
- 1999 – Mohács
- 2000 – Mezőkövesd
- 2001 – Mezőkövesd
- 2002 – Mezőkövesd
- 2003 – Mezőkövesd
- 2004 – Mezőkövesd

=== Exhibitions ===
- 1995 – ‘In the Gate of Sun’ – photo and ethnographic exhibition and folk dance show in the Ethnographical Museum, Budapest
- 1996 – country-cross series of ‘In the Gate of Sun’ – photo and ethnographic exhibition
- 1997 – Mexican photo and ethnographic exhibition – Kalocsa
- 1999 – Los Gringos and Jatari common concert and exhibition – Kiskunhalas
- 2000 – ‘In the Gate of Sun’ – photo and ethnographic exhibition
- 2001 – ‘The Amazing Cordilleras’ – photo and ethnographic exhibition country tour
- 2001 – ‘With Bearmen to the Mountain Gods’ – slide-projection – Eger
- 2001 – ‘With Bearmen to the Mountain Gods’ – slide-projection – Miskolc
- 2002 – ’10 Years from the Life of Jatari Indian Folk Art Group’ exhibition
- 2002 – ‘The Amazing Cordilleras’ – photo and ethnographic exhibition – Eger
- 2002 – ‘The Amazing Cordilleras’ – photo and ethnographic exhibition – Vámosgyörk
- 2004 – ‘The Amazing Cordilleras’ – photo and ethnographic exhibition – Emőd
- 2004 – ‘The Amazing Cordilleras’ – photo and ethnographic exhibition – Mezőkövesd
- 2006 – Travelling exhibition – Miskolc
- 2006 – Peruvian Pictured Chronicle’ exhibition – Mezőkövesd
- 2007 – Inka exhibition in the Fine Arts Museum – Budapest
- 2007 – ‘Ancient Cult in a Christian World’ – Peruvian photo exhibition in Mezőkövesd
- 2008 – ‘Catholic Churches in the Andes’ photo exhibition – Mezőkövesd
- 2008 – ‘Ecuador, the Land of Equinox’ – photo and ethnographic exhibition – Mezőkövesd
- 20 July 2009 – opening the Andes Folk Gallery, what is the only South –American Gallery in Hungary – 24. Szent László Square, Mezőkövesd

=== Tours ===
- 1993 – cross-country tour with Los Andinos Group
- 1994 – cross-country tour with Los Gringos Group
- 1995 – cross-country tour with Los Gringos Group
- 1995 – tour in the environs of Keszthely
- 2003 – ‘In the Gate of Sun’ cross-country tour of Jatari

=== Concerts ===
- 1995 – Nationality folk festival – Pomáz – Los Gringos – Jatari group
- 1996 – Nationality folk festival – Mezőkövesd – Los Gringos – Jatari group
- 1996 – Los Gringos and Jatari group's common concert
- 1997 – Los Gringos and Jatari's show in Budai House of Music – Fonó
- 1998 – Jatari – Pescador de Perlas Show on Women's Day – Mezőkövesd
- 1998 – Jatari's performance for the School of Blind and Low Vision Persons – Debrecen
- 2005 – ‘Midsummer Night's Concert’ – Szombathely
- 2006 – Ayarachis record introducing concert
- 2006 – XXVII. International Vintage Celebration – Kiskunhalas

=== Television shows ===
- 1993 – Jatari group's participation on a talent competition broadcast, called ‘Ki mit tud’
- 1994 – South-American ZOO Park's opening in Szeged, Jatari-Los Gringos’ live show on MTV's ‘Szieszta’
- 1996 – Jatari group's participation on a talent competition broadcast, called ‘Ki mit tud’
- 1997 – National Latin American dance festival – Kiskunhalas – Jatari
- 2000 – MTV, ‘Téma’, a film about the leader of Jatari
- 2001 – RTL, ‘Fókusz’, a report film on Koncz László and Kurdi Zoltán
- 2008 – MTV, ‘Főtér’
- 2008 – Fiesta de San Pedro – travelogue film of Koncz László in Ecuador

== Prices ==
- 1997 – Special Fee of International Folk Dance Festival in Poland, Zory
- 2008 – Local Government of Mezőkövesd gave to László Koncz, the founder and leader of Jatari Indian Folk Association the title of ‘The Man of Year’.

== Authentic instruments ==
- from Ecuador: palla, rondador, pututus, bocina wind instruments
- from Peru: maolin, mandolin, charango bow instruments, chulis, Malta, sanka panpipes
- from Bolivia: jula-jula ritual war and toyos panpipes, charango instrument family, drums, bells
