= 10th World Festival of Youth and Students =

1973 youth festival in Berlin

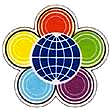
- Host country: East Germany
- Dates: 28 July – 5 August 1973
- Motto: For Anti-Imperialist Solidarity, Peace and Friendship
- Cities: East Berlin
- Participants: 8 million (25,600 guests from 140 countries)
- Follows: 9th World Festival of Youth and Students
- Precedes: 11th World Festival of Youth and Students

The 10th World Festival of Youth and Students (WFYS) was held from 28 July to 5 August 1973 in East Berlin, the capital of East Germany.

== Organisation and events ==
The festival, organised by the World Federation of Democratic Youth (WFDY) was previously hosted in East Berlin in 1951. Around 8 million visitors and 25,600 guests from 140 countries attended, under the motto, "For Anti-Imperialist Solidarity, Peace and Friendship".

Notable attendees of the festival included Communist Party USA member and activist Angela Davis, Soviet cosmonaut Valentina Tereshkova and Chairman of the Palestine Liberation Organization Yasser Arafat. The Communist Party of Turkey also sent a notably higher delegation to the event compared to previous years. It was followed by the 11th World Festival of Youth and Students, hosted in Havana, Cuba in July to August 1978.

== Gallery ==
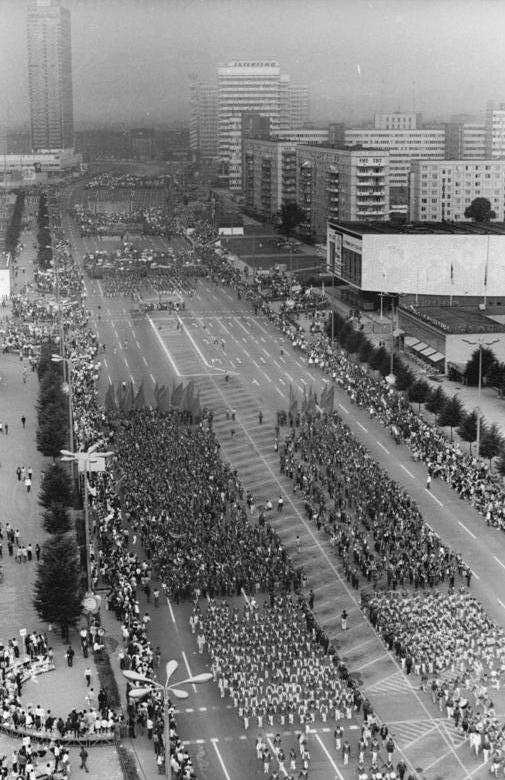
Congregation of Free German Youth (FDJ) members in East Berlin

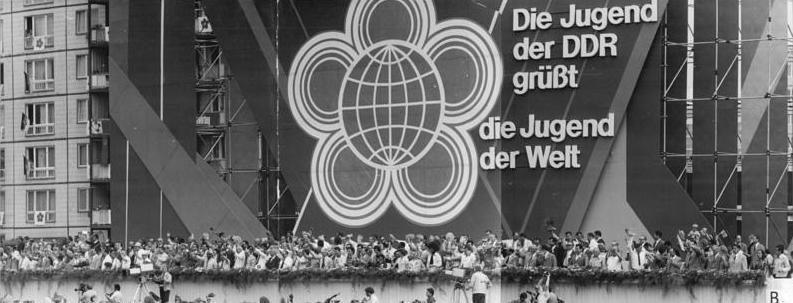
Panorama of the grandstand

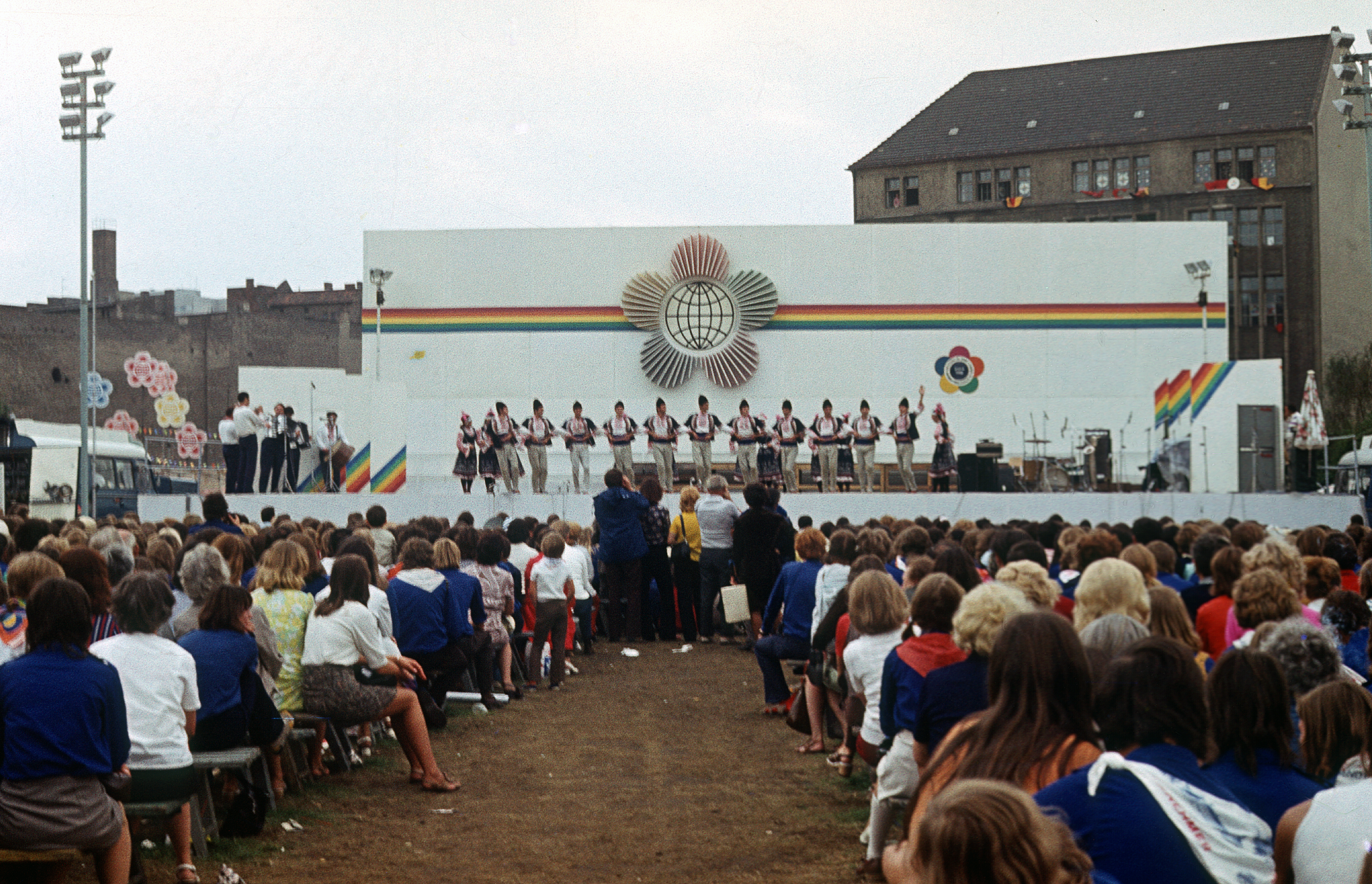
Youth and students gathering on stage

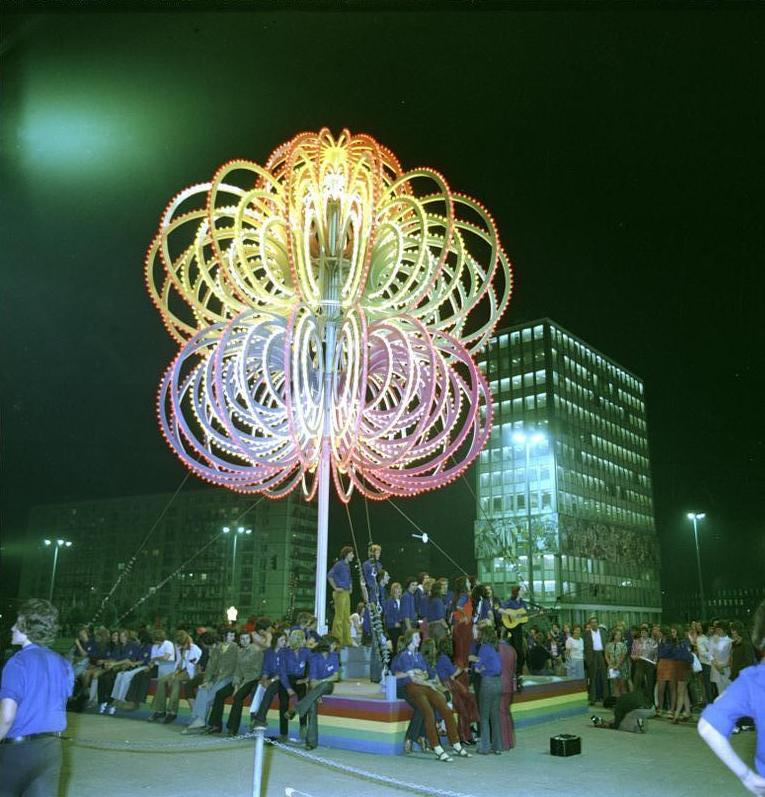
Festival flower in Alexanderplatz

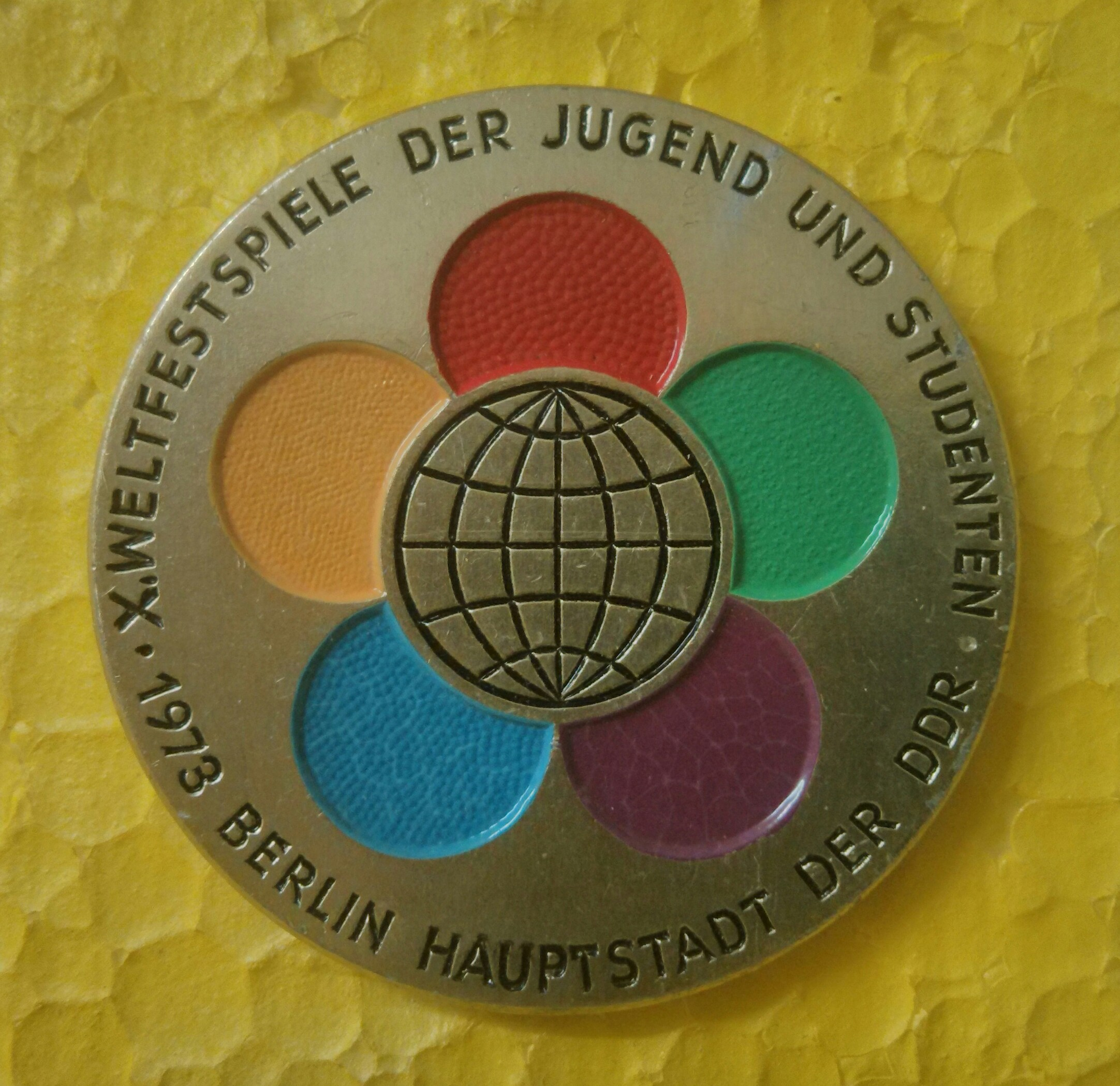
Badge at the Prora NVA museum depicting the logo

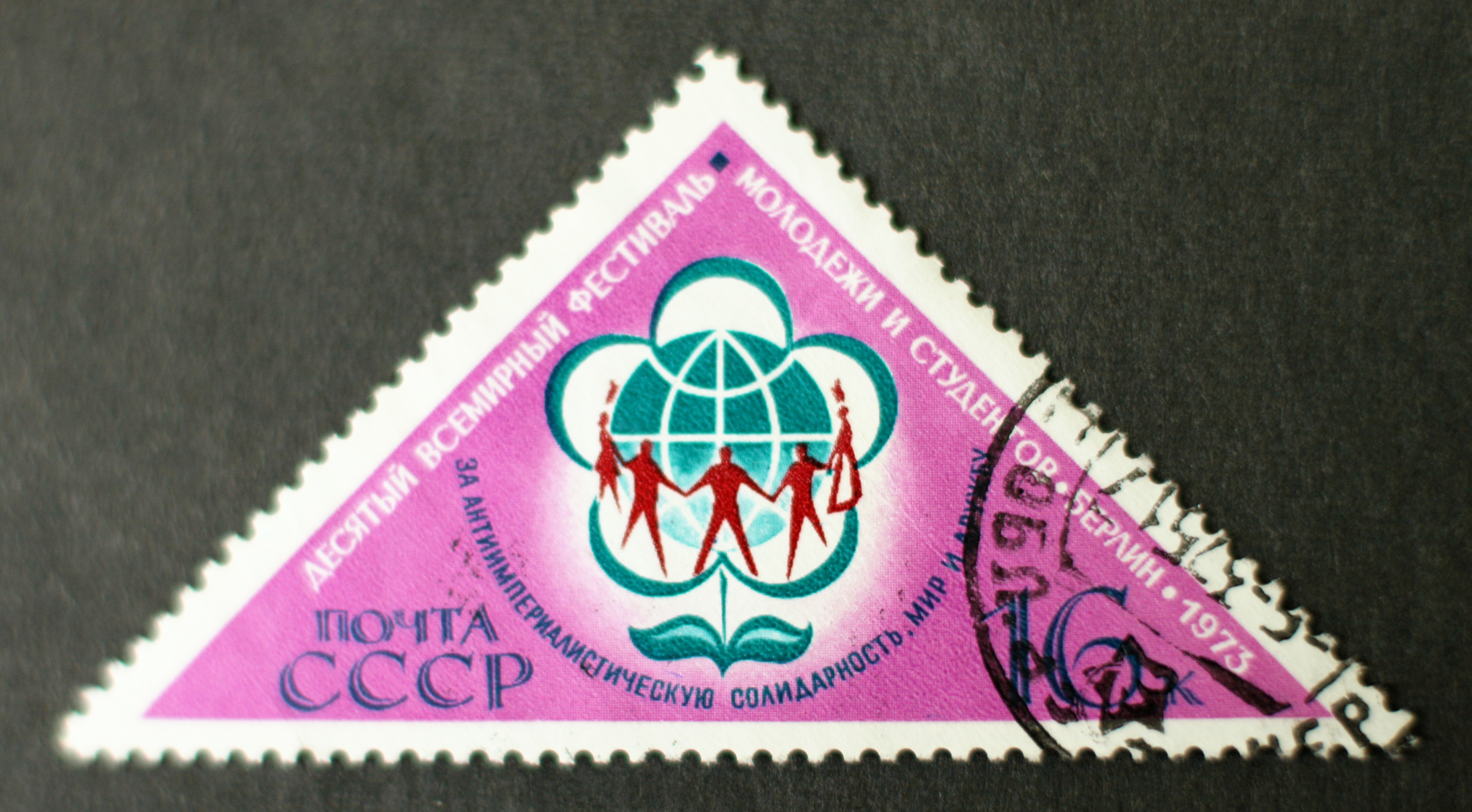
Soviet stamp commemorating the festival

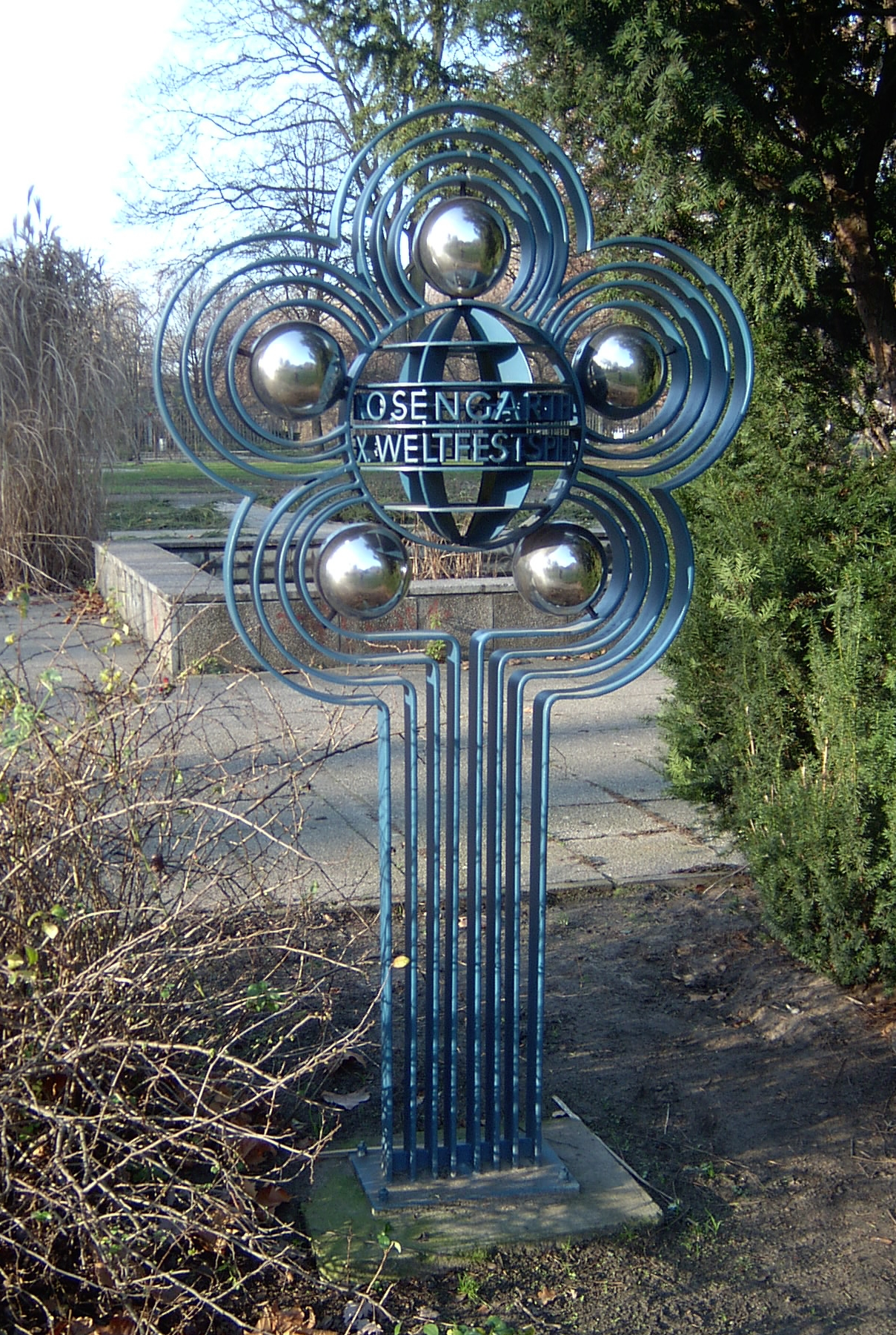
Festival flower sculpture by Achim Kühn
