= Oscar Feltsman =

Russian composer

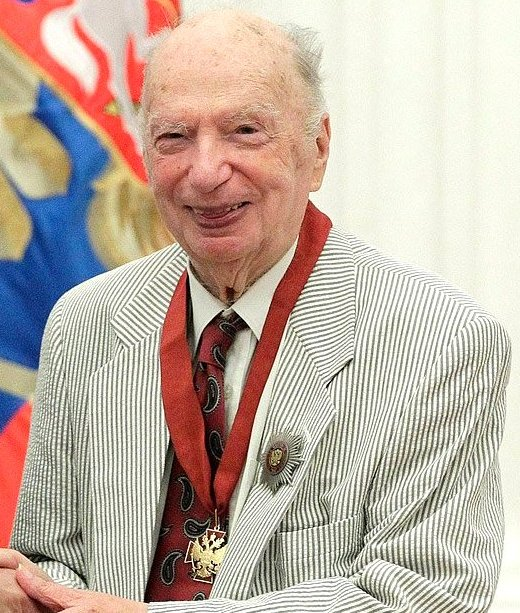
- Feltsman in 2011
- Born: Oscar Borisovich Feltsman; 18 February 1921; Odesa, Ukrainian SSR
- Died: 3 February 2013 (aged 91); Moscow, Russia
- Resting place: Novodevichy Cemetery, Moscow, Russia
- Title: People’s Artist of the RSFSR (1989)
- Children: Vladimir Feltsman
- Awards: Order "For Merit to the Fatherland" (2nd class); Order "For Merit to the Fatherland" (3rd class); Order "For Merit to the Fatherland" (4th class); Order of Friendship

Oscar Borisovich Feltsman (Ukrainian & Russian: Оскар Борисович Фельцман; 18 February 1921 – 3 February 2013) was a Ukrainian-born composer.

== Biography ==
Feltsman was born in Odesa, the son of Boris Osipovich Feltsman, a Jewish orthopedic surgeon who also played the piano professionally. He had musical training from the age of five; learning the violin as a pupil of Pyotr Stolyarsky and the piano with Bertha Reynbald, who also taught Emil Gilels and Tatiana Goldfarb. He produced his first musical composition for the piano "Autumn" when he was six years old.

Feltsman graduated from the Pyotr Stolyarsky Music School in Odesa in 1939, where he studied composition with the composer Nikolai Vilinsky. Then Feltsman was admitted to the Moscow Conservatory, studying under Vissarion Shebalin who wrote a letter of thanks on behalf of the Moscow Conservatory to Vilinsky for teaching Feltsman composition.

During the Second World War, Feltsman was evacuated to Novosibirsk, becoming at 20 the executive secretary of the Siberian Union of Composers, where he wrote music for the philharmonic, Leningrad Alexandrinsky Theater and the Jewish theater of Belarus. In the same period Feltsman wrote an operetta based on Valentin Kataev's play "Blue Scarf", which was criticised in the newspaper "Pravda". In 1941, Oscar Feltsman married Evgenia Kaydanovskaya a student of the choral conducting faculty of the Moscow Conservatory. He returned to Moscow from Novosibirsk in 1945.

Starting with musical comedies at the beginning of his career, Feltsman subsequently combined producing traditional classical music with writing music for circuses and children's variety shows. After around 1952 Feltsman started to write popular songs and later on produced a number of popular songs. The first of these was Cruise based on poems by B. Dragunsky and L. Davidovich and performed by Leonid Utyosov as well as Convallarias which was based on poetry by Olga Fadeeva.

In 1948, at the Operetta Theatre in Moscow his musical comedy Air castle was premiered and in 1952, were two further premieres - at the Operetta Theater Suvorochka and at the Stanislavsky Theater Mediterranean Sea Make a Noise. Around this time Feltsman also began to write music for Circuses and children's variety shows, staged by Natalia Sats. Also in 1952, Feltsman wrote his Violin Concerto in three parts. Thereafter he wrote a few songs - the first of these was Cruise based on poems by B. Dragunsky and L. Davidovich and performed by Leonid Utyosov. Feltsman subsequently went on to collaborate with a number of prominent Russian poets including Andrey Voznesensky, Rasul Gamzatov, Eugene Dolmatovsky, Mihail Matusovsky, I. Kohanovsky, Mark Lisyansky, Lev Oshanin, Robert Rozhdestvensky, V. Kharitonov, Igor Shaferan, M. Tanich, V. Orlov, N. Olev, M. Ryabinin. His music has been performed by notable singers including L. Utesov, Mark Bernes, Vladimir Troshin, Joseph Kobzon, Muslim Magomaev, Edita Piekha, Eduard Khil, V. Tolkunova, Yuri Gulyaev, G. Ots, Lev Leshchenko, O. Anofriev, M. Pahomenko, & Leonid Serebrennikov. In 1968, he co-writes a song "Ogromnoe nebo".

His most popular song was "Lilies of the Valley" («Ландыши»), written to verse by Olga Fadeeva (ru) and sung by Gelena Velikanova at its première.

In 1973, Feltsman wrote music for the plays Charley's Aunt, The Old Houses and Let the Guitar Play. In the mid-1980s, Feltsman arranged concerts for the instrumental ensemble The Lights of Moscow with soloist Irina Allegrova before handing over to David Tuhmanov after two successful years.

In 1987, Feltsman wrote his vocal cycle Songs of Bygone, based on Jewish folk songs and produced the book Songs of Bygone In the late 1990s Feltsman wrote 12 songs based on poetry by Yuri Garin which was performed in Odesa to celebrate the 200th anniversary of the city.

Feltsman wrote a number of chamber works: Ten romances on the poems of Inna Lisnyanskaya, The cycle of romances on the poetry of Marina Tsvetaeva, The cycle of songs on poems Hayyim Nahman Bialik.

He died, aged 91 of heart failure, in Moscow.

== Honours and awards ==
- Order of Merit for the Fatherland, 2nd class (2011), 3rd class (2006) and 4th class (2001)
- Order of Friendship (1996)
- Honoured Artist of the Chechen-Ingush Republic
- People's Artist of the RSFSR (1989)
- People's Artist of the Dagestan ASSR (1975)
- Honoured Artist of the RSFSR (1972)
