= The Vast Sky =

1968 Soviet song

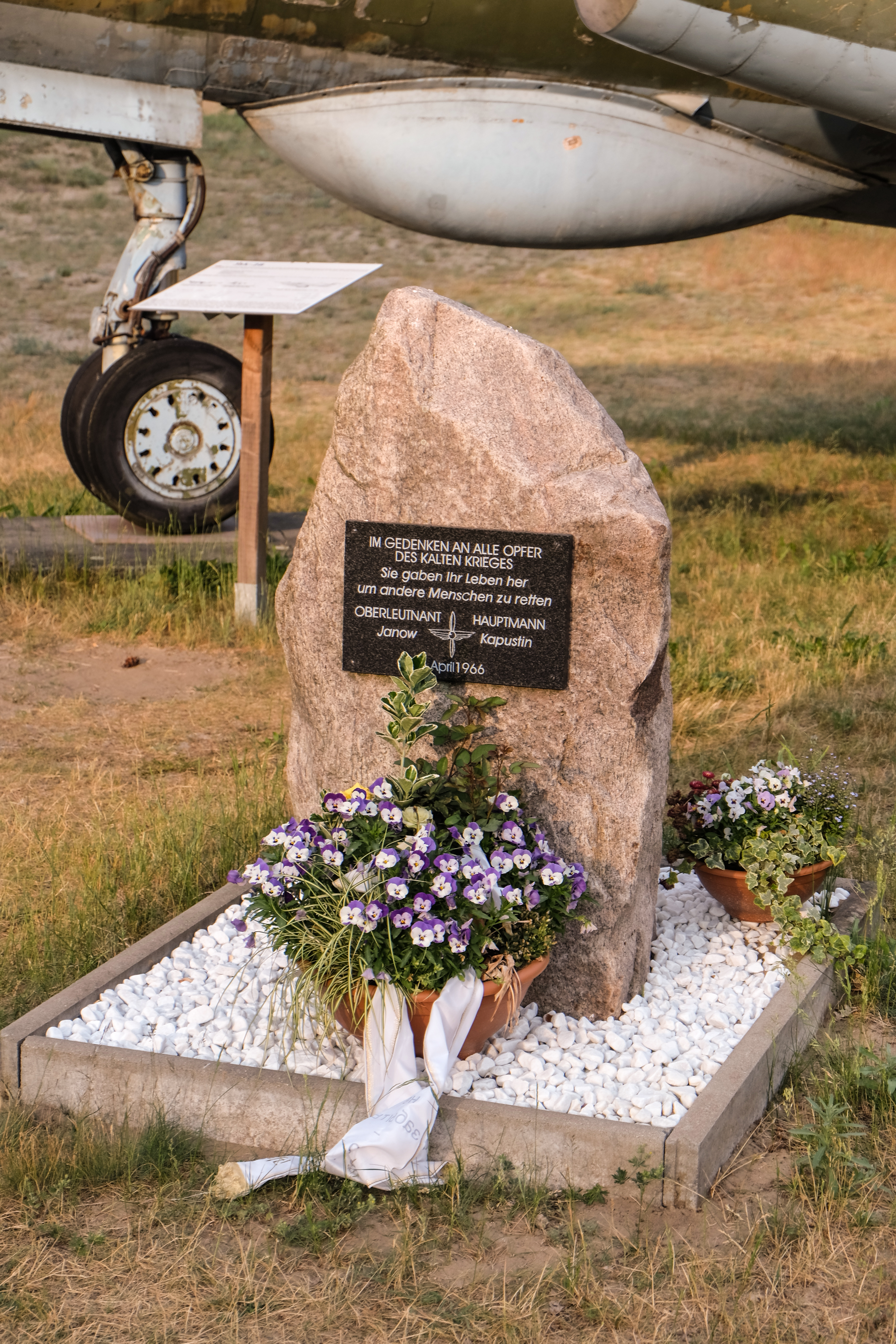
Monument to the feat of Yanov and Kapustin in the Finowfurt Aviation Museum

"The Vast Sky" (Russian: «Огромное небо») is a song written in 1968 by Soviet Russian songwriters Oscar Feltsman (composer) and Robert Rozhdestvensky (poet) and arranged by Alexander Bronevitskiy. It was initially performed by singer and actress Edita Piekha.

This song is dedicated to pilots Boris Kapustin and Yury Yanov, who both died in a plane crash on 6 April 1966, flying from West Berlin.

Mark Bernes, Muslim Magomayev, Ljiljana Petrović, Heli Lääts also recorded their versions of the song.

== Story ==
On 6 April 1966, the Yakovlev Yak-28 of Group of Soviet Forces in Germany's 24th Air Army crashed into the Stössensee lake in West Berlin due to compressor stall of both engines. The pilots, Captain Boris Kapustin and Senior Lieutenant Yury Yanov, chose not to eject from the stricken aircraft, piloting it away from the center of Berlin. At first they tried to land on Berlin's cemetery but rejected after recognizing lots of people on that area; then they tried to land on Stössensee lake but were forced to lift the plane after recognizing a levee full or traffic. The plane then crashed into the lake under a large angle. Both pilots were killed.

British military divers arrived at the crash site, and immediately engaged in lifting some particularly important parts of the crashed aircraft. They managed to dismantle the unique Eagle-D radar ("Skipspin" according to the NATO classification) and it, along with engine parts, was examined at the British airbase in Farnborough. The Telegraph proudly described this action as one of the most "astounding espionage operations of the Cold War".

Only on the third day, April 8, 1966, the remains of Soviet pilots were handed over to representatives of the Group of Soviet Troops in Germany. Each city of the GDR sent its delegation to participate in the funeral ceremony, and the Royal orchestra arrived from the UK. The mayor of West Berlin, the future Chancellor of Germany Willy Brandt said: "We can proceed from the assumption that both of them at crucial moments were aware of the danger of falling into densely populated areas, and in coordination with the ground surveillance service turned the plane towards Lake Stössensee. It meant giving up one's own salvation. I say this with grateful recognition to the victim who prevented the catastrophe".

On May 10, 1966, Boris Vladislavovich Kapustin and Yuri Nikolaevich Yanov were posthumously awarded the Order of the Red Banner for their courage and bravery shown in the performance of military duty. Boris Kapustin, buried in Rostov-on-Don, is named after Voroshilovsky district street of the city and school No. 51. In honor of Yuri Yanov, on September 1, 2001, a memorial plaque was installed on the building of Vyazma Secondary School No. 1. On March 30, 2001, to mark the 35th anniversary of the feat of pilots, celebrations were held in Berlin, and in the aviation museum, created after the withdrawal of Soviet troops at the Finov airfield, a monument was settled near the Yak-28 aircraft with the inscription: "In memory of all the victims of the Cold War. They gave their lives to save other people" («Памяти всех жертв холодной войны. Они отдали свои жизни, чтобы спасти других людей»).

== Awards ==
In 1968, as part of the IX World Festival of Youth and Students in Sofia, the song received several awards: a gold medal and first place in a political song contest, a gold medal for performance and poetry, as well as a silver medal for music.
