= 23rd Moscow International Film Festival =

Film festival

- Location: Moscow, Russia
- Founded: 1959
- Awards: Grand Prix
- Festival date: 21–30 June 2001
- Website: Website

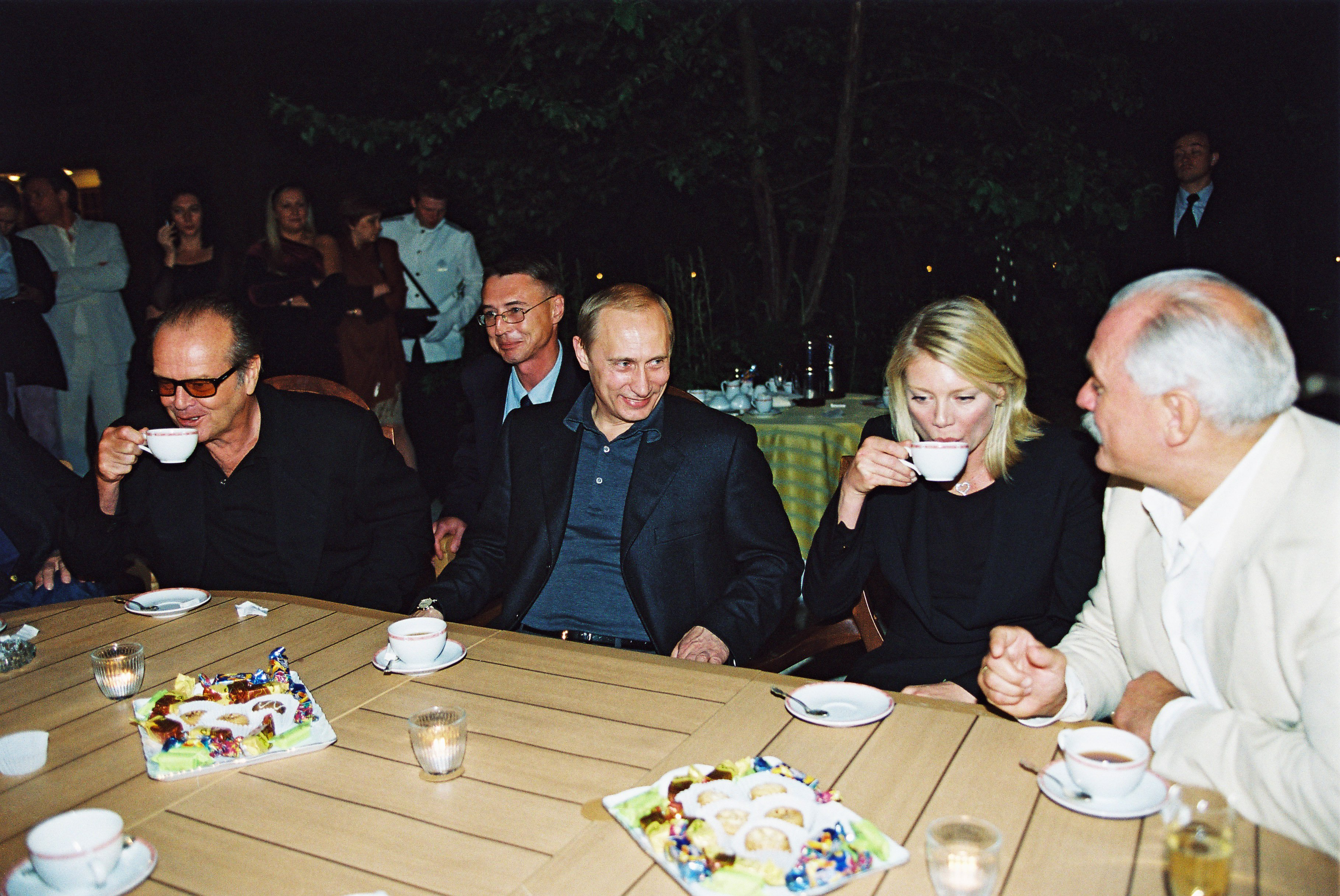
President Putin meeting with participants in the 23rd Moscow International Film Festival. With actors Jack Nicholson, Peta Wilson and the festival's president, Nikita Mikhalkov (left to right).

The 23rd Moscow International Film Festival was held from 21 to 30 June 2001. The Golden St. George was awarded to the American film The Believer directed by Henry Bean.

== Jury ==
- Margarethe von Trotta (Germany – President of the Jury)
- Jiang Wen (China)
- Bohdan Stupka (Ukraine)
- Moritz de Hadeln (Germany)
- Ingeborga Dapkūnaitė (Lithuania)
- Igor Maslennikov (France)
- Geoffrey Gilmore (United States)

== Films in competition ==
The following films were selected for the main competition:

English title	Original title	Director(s)	Production country
The Believer	The Believer	Henry Bean	United States
Unfair Competition	Concorrenza sleale	Ettore Scola	Italy, France
Keep Away from the Window	Daleko od okna	Jan Jakub Kolski	Poland
Detector	Detektor	Pål Jackman	Norway
Inheritance	Herencia	Paula Hernández	Argentina
Love Story by Tea	Love Story by Tea	Jin chen	China
Mademoiselle	Mademoiselle	Philippe Lioret	France
My Sweet	Mi dulce	Jesús Mora	Spain, Italy
Victims and Murderers	Oběti a vrazi	Andrea Sedláčková	Czech Republic, France, Switzerland
The Quickie	The Quickie	Sergei Bodrov	Germany
Real Fiction	Shilje sanghwangg	Kim Ki-duk	South Korea
Blind Guys	Vakvagányok	Péter Tímár	Hungary
Wings of Glass	Vingar av glas	Reza Bagher	Sweden
Wild Mussels	Wilde Mossels	Erik de Bruyn	Netherlands
Peony Pavilion	Youyuan jingmeng	Yonfan	Hong Kong
Under the Skin of the City	Zir-e poost-e shahr	Rakhshan Bani-E'temad	Iran

== Awards ==
- Golden St. George: The Believer by Henry Bean
- Special Golden St.George: Under the Skin of the City by Rakhshan Bani-E'temad
- Silver St. George:
  - Best Director: Ettore Scola for Unfair Competition
  - Best Actor: Vladimir Mashkov for The Quickie
  - Best Actress: Rie Miyazawa for Peony Pavilion
- Special Silver St. George: Eduard Artemyev, composer
- Stanislavsky Award: Jack Nicholson
- Prix FIPRESCI: Blind Guys by Péter Tímár
