= Imre Antal =

(1935–2008) classical pianist, performer

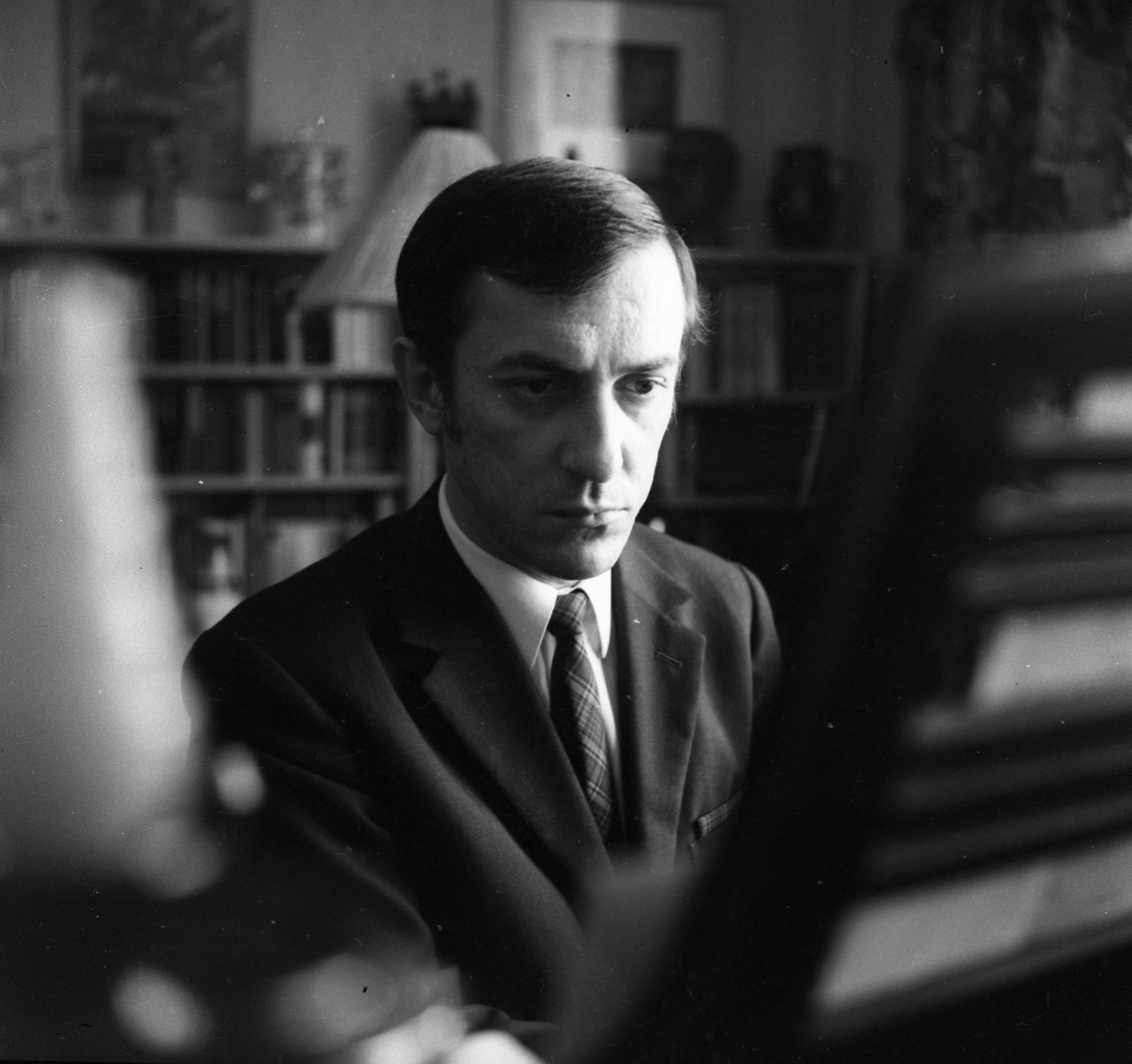
- Antal in 1969
- Born: 31 July 1935; Hódmezővásárhely, Hungary
- Died: 15 April 2008 (aged 72); Budapest, Hungary
- Occupations: Pianist; television presenter; comedian
- Years active: 1958–2007

Imre Antal (31 July 1935 – 15 April 2008) was a Hungarian pianist, television presenter and comedian.

== His career as a pianist ==
He graduated from the Hungarian Academy of Music Zeneakadémia, Budapest. He became a celebrated young pianist in the 1960s. He was 2nd prize winner of the 7th and 8th World Festival of Youth and Students, Vienna, 1959 and Helsinki, 1962. In 1960 he was awarded the 2nd prize at the XII Concorso Busoni, and six years later he won the 1st prize at Budapest's Liszt-Bartók International Pianist Competition (Although the international jury pronounced him as the winner, the organizers did not award the 1st prize - possibly for a political pressure, officially he received a 2nd prize as the best performer.) Hungaroton record publisher has recorded and released some Bach and Liszt works in his interpretation in the late 1960s and early 1970s. He was awarded with Erkel Prize (Erkel Ferenc-díj for the recognition of outstanding artists).

== Filming and television career ==
From the mid-1960s he began presenting programmes for the music section of Hungarian television. He also took acting jobs, most notably in the 1969 TV-series Bors. In 1971 an illness of his hands ended his music career and he devoted himself fully to television. His proficiency in foreign languages allowed him to host at television shows notable celebrities visiting to Hungary from the western side of the iron curtain. His most notable guests were the Italian movie actress Gina Lollobrigida and the American violinist Yehudi Menuhin.

His biggest success was the comedy television program Szeszélyes évszakok (Capricious Seasons) which he presented on the national channel M1 from 1981 to 2005.

== Late years ==
His autobiography was published in 1990 and reprinted in 2002. In 2006 he reappeared briefly on RTL Klub with András Csonka, however, he was diagnosed with cancer. As his sickness grew on him he wished to continue making comedy programmes until his death. RTL Klub offered him to host their show Szeszélyes (Capricious) (which was actually only a low-key copy of his original show). On his honor a Budapest private nursery school was named after him in 2007. He died in Budapest on 15 April 2008.
