= World Festival of Youth (2024) =

2024 event in Russia

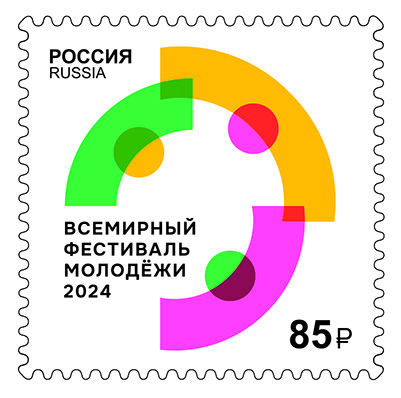
- Host country: Russia
- Date: February 29 – March 7, 2024
- Motto: Let's start the future together!
- Cities: Fedepalnaya territory Sirius
- Participants: 20,000 people, 190 countries
- Follows: World Festival of Youth (Russia, 2030)
- Website: https://fest2024.com/en

The World Festival of Youth is an international Youth festival which was held in federalnaya territory Sirius, Russia, from February 29 – March 7, 2024.

== Organization of the festival ==
On April 5, 2023, Russian president Putin signed a decree on holding the World Youth Festival in 2024. The festival will be held to develop international youth cooperation.

In the spring of 2023, the composition of the Organizing Committee and its Presidium was also formed. The Organizing Committee for the preparation and holding of the World Youth Festival was formed to ensure coordination of the activities and interaction of federal executive authorities, executive authorities of the subjects of the Russian Federation, local governments and organizations involved in the implementation of events for the preparation and holding of the festival, as well as in solving other related tasks.

In 2023 The Government of the Russian Federation within a three-month period was instructed to develop and implement, with the participation of federal executive authorities, measures aimed at preparing and holding the World Youth Festival, to assist in public media coverage of the events for the preparation and holding of the Festival and to identify sources of financial support for the events for the preparation and holding of the Festival.

May 11, 2023 in Moscow the first meeting of the Organizing Committee of the World Youth Festival was held under the chairmanship of the first deputy head of the Presidential Administration of Russia, Sergey Kiriyenko.

On June 8, 2023 on "Dobro. Conferences" in the Samara region, applications for the World Youth Festival Volunteer Corps have been launched. Applications from those wishing to become volunteers of the World Youth Festival will be accepted until December 1, 2023.

By mid-August 2023, preparatory committees have been opened in more than 15 countries that will participate in the World Youth Festival. Among these States: Argentina, Honduras, Israel, Indonesia, Iraq, Spain, Yemen, Liberia, Malaysia, Mexico, Pakistan, Panama, Paraguay, Uruguay, Caribbean countries, European Union, US, Baltic States. The preparatory committees selected the participants of the festival, created delegations, and then formed a youth movement in the participating countries. At the same time, the opening of similar committees was announced in more than 40 countries around the world.

In September 2023, national preparatory committees for the World Youth Festival were organized in 38 countries around the world. Young people from 180 countries expressed their desire to participate in the forum.

June 24, 2023 on Youth Day the application campaign for participation in the World Youth Festival has started were accepted, the concept, program and logo of the future festival were presented.

In June 2023, on the building of the college in Samara opened mural in honor of the start of the volunteer program of the World Youth Festival.

On February 15, 2024, the American delegation of the World Youth Festival chaired by Caleb Maupin of the Center for Political Innovation, joined by Christopher Helali of the American Communist Party and Elizabeth Pekin of the American Student Union, held a press conference at the United Nations building in New York City sponsored by the Russian Mission to the United Nations.

The festival was attended by over 20,000 people from 190 countries, among them are participants, activists, young people from the US, the European Union, the Caribbean Basin, CIS, BRICS and Democratic People's Republic of Korea, Baltic countries. Five thousand volunteers, 300 Russian guides worked at the festival site, and all Russian regions took over the patronage of foreign delegations. The regional program of the festival was held from March 10 to March 17, its participants visited 30 cities of Russia.

=== Festival participants ===
According to organizers, 20,000 people and 190 countries take part in it: Russian and foreign participants from the fields of business, media, international cooperation, culture, volunteering and charity, sport, different spheres of life.

According to the head of Rosmolodezhi Ksenia Razuvaeva among the participants will be students, young professionals, entrepreneurs, leaders of non-profit organizations, diplomats, athletes and cultural figures. It was proposed to expand the age of the Festival participants.

=== Participating countries ===
- Abkhazia
- Afghanistan
- Albania
- Algeria
- Andorra
- Angola
- Antigua and Barbuda
- Argentina
- Armenia
- Australia
- Austria
- Azerbaijan
- Bahamas
- Bahrain
- Bangladesh
- Barbados
- Belarus
- Belgium
- Belize
- Benin
- Bhutan
- Bolivia
- Bosnia and Herzegovina
- Botswana
- Brazil
- Brunei
- Bulgaria
- Burkina Faso
- Burundi
- Cambodia
- Cameroon
- Canada
- Cape Verde
- Central African Republic
- Chad
- Chile
- China
- Colombia
- Comoros
- Costa Rica
- Croatia
- Cuba
- Cyprus
- Czech Republic
- Democratic Republic of the Congo
- Denmark
- Djibouti
- Dominica
- Dominican Republic
- East Timor
- Ecuador
- Egypt
- El Salvador
- Equatorial Guinea
- Eritrea
- Estonia
- Eswatini
- Ethiopia
- Fiji
- Finland
- France
- Gabon
- Gambia
- Georgia
- Germany
- Ghana
- Greece
- Grenada
- Guatemala
- Guinea
- Guinea-Bissau
- Guyana
- Haiti
- Honduras
- Hungary
- Iceland
- India
- Indonesia
- Iran
- Iraq
- Ireland
- Israel
- Italy
- Ivory Coast
- Jamaica
- Japan
- Jordan
- Kazakhstan
- Kenya
- Kuwait
- Kyrgyzstan
- Laos
- Latvia
- Lebanon
- Lesotho
- Liberia
- Libya
- Liechtenstein
- Lithuania
- Luxembourg
- Madagascar
- Malawi
- Malaysia
- Maldives
- Mali
- Malta
- Mauritania
- Mauritius
- Mexico
- Moldova
- Monaco
- Mongolia
- Montenegro
- Morocco
- Mozambique
- Myanmar
- Namibia
- Nauru
- Nepal
- Netherlands
- New Zealand
- Nicaragua
- Niger
- Nigeria
- North Korea
- North Macedonia
- Norway
- Oman
- Pakistan
- Palau
- Palestine
- Panama
- Papua New Guinea
- Paraguay
- Peru
- Philippines
- Poland
- Portugal
- Qatar
- Republic of the Congo
- Romania
- Russia (host)
- Rwanda
- Saint Kitts and Nevis
- Saint Lucia
- Saint Vincent and the Grenadines
- São Tomé and Príncipe
- Saudi Arabia
- Senegal
- Serbia
- Seychelles
- Sierra Leone
- Singapore
- Slovakia
- Slovenia
- Solomon Islands
- Somalia
- South Africa
- South Korea
- South Ossetia
- South Sudan
- Spain
- Sri Lanka
- Sudan
- Suriname
- Sweden
- Switzerland
- Syria
- Tajikistan
- Tanzania
- Thailand
- Togo
- Tonga
- Trinidad and Tobago
- Tunisia
- Turkey
- Turkmenistan
- Uganda
- Ukraine (unofficial)
- United Arab Emirates
- United Kingdom
- United States
- Uruguay
- Uzbekistan
- Vanuatu
- Venezuela
- Vietnam
- Yemen
- Zambia
- Zimbabwe

Ukrainian citizens have participated but they were not an official delegation in the Festival.

=== Festival goals ===
The purpose of the festival is to create a platform for networking between young people from around the world. The International Youth Festival's objectives include, to become the capital of the future just world, where respect for each other, values and culture of various countries and peoples is at the forefront.

=== Festival organizers ===
The organizer of the international youth festival is the Directorate of the World Youth Festival, two more special bodies have been created for the preparation and holding of the festival — The International Program Committee, which includes the heads of the largest NGOs, businesses and youth organizations, as well as the International Youth Council, which unites youth and young leaders of Russia and foreign countries.

=== Festival program ===
The program of the World Youth Festival will be based on the values of unity, equality, justice, mutual assistance, teamwork and charity.

It was decided to focus on a format in which everyone had the opportunity to voice their opinions and hear the positions of the same young people from other regions and countries. Much attention was paid to the sports and cultural component of the festival, Russia's achievements in the field of youth development were shown, and there was an opportunity to do useful and kind deeds together. The festival included a large number of different youth engagement formats: part of the program went beyond the main venue. During the same period, a large-scale international exhibition and forum "Russia" was launched, which demonstrated Russia's most important achievements in various industries. For the participants of the World Festival, it became one of the points of the program and an important element in getting to know Russia.

Each day of the festival was dedicated to a specific theme – "Responsibility for the fate of the world" (March 2), "Multinational Unity" (March 3), "A world of opportunities for everyone" (March 4), "Let's save the family in the name of children and peace" (March 5), "We – Together with Russia" (March 6).

As part of the program, participants of the international youth festival met with leading politicians, public figures, representatives of corporations, companies, athletes, representatives of youth organizations.

The regional program of the World Youth Festival took place from March 10 to March 17, 2024, participants visited 30 cities of Russia. So, in Perm from March 13 to March 15, about 2 thousand young people from different regions of Russia and other countries participated in the "Act!" festival; The Perm delegation of the WFM met with the heads of the cities of Prikamye, university rectors, student and youth activists.

=== Participation of volunteers at the festival ===
5,000 volunteers from all regions of Russia were involved in the organization and holding of the World Youth Festival. Applications from volunteers for the Festival were accepted through the ecosystem of the Association of Volunteer Centers of Russia.

=== Opening ceremony of the festival ===
On March 2, 2024, the Grand Ice Palace in Sochi hosted the opening ceremony of the World Youth Festival under the motto: "The world is changing because I am changing.". At the end of the official part of the address, Russian president Vladimir Putin addressed the participants and opened the international youth festival.

=== Closing ceremony of the Festival ===
On March 6, 2024, the closing ceremony of the World Youth Festival took place. The final part of the event was a speech by Russian president Vladimir Putin, who spoke in person.

== See also ==
- International Youth Festival in Yekaterinburg 2026.
- Medjugorje International Youth Festival
- World Festival of Youth and Students
