= 11th World Festival of Youth and Students =

1978 youth festival in Havana, Cuba

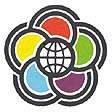
- Host country: Cuba
- Dates: 28 July - 5 August 1978
- Motto: For Anti-Imperialist Solidarity, Peace and Friendship
- Cities: Havana
- Participants: 18,500 people from 145 countries
- Follows: 10th World Festival of Youth and Students
- Precedes: 12th World Festival of Youth and Students

The 11th World Festival of Youth and Students was held from 27 July to 3 August 1978 in Havana, capital city of Cuba.

== Organisation and events ==
The festival was attended by 18,500 young people from 145 countries. The motto of the festival was "For Anti-imperialist Solidarity, Peace and Friendship". This was the first time the festival was held in the western hemisphere of the world.

The proposal to hold the 11th festival in Cuba was supported at the 10th General Assembly of the World Federation of Democratic Youth held in November 1974 in Varna, Bulgaria. The First Congress of the Communist Party of Cuba approved a resolution on hosting the 11th Festival, followed by a similar resolution at the 3rd Congress of the Young Communist League (UJC).

The festival started on 28 July 1978, thousands of young people from around the world marching three kilometers through the main avenues of the capital towards the Latin American Stadium where the opening ceremony was held. It ended on 5 August 1978 with a huge demonstration in the historic Plaza de la Revolución José Martí.
