= 17th World Festival of Youth and Students =

2010 youth festival in Pretoria, South Africa

- Host country: South Africa
- Date: December 13–21, 2010
- Motto: "Let's Defeat Imperialism, for a World of Peace, Solidarity and Social Transformation!"
- Cities: Pretoria
- Participants: 15,000, from 126 countries
- Follows: 16th World Festival of Youth and Students
- Precedes: 18th World Festival of Youth and Students

The 17th World Festival of Youth and Students (WFYS) was an event that was opened on December 13, 2010 in the South African capital of Pretoria and was organized by the World Federation of Democratic Youth (WFDY).

== Organisation and events ==
The festival attracted 15,000 people from close to 130 countries and was held under the slogan, "Let's Defeat Imperialism, for a World of Peace, Solidarity and Social Transformation!". It was the second time that an edition of the WFYS has been held in Africa, with the other being in Algeria in 2001.

Some media reported that the festival organisers originally claimed that the festival would cost R370 million, but in reality the festival was organised by the National Youth Development Agency (NYDA), whose annual budget was R370 million at the time. The organisers were able to secure R69 million of funding, even after a gift from the South African National Lottery of R40 million. The true cost of the festival was later revealed to have been around R100 million. This included R24.5 million for travel and accommodation, R29.9 million for catering, and R9.4 million for entertainment. Delegates were originally going to be housed at Nasrec in Johannesburg, and transported daily to the festival venue in Pretoria 80km away, but given the shortage of funds the organisers eventually relented and housed the delegates at the Tshwane University in Pretoria, saving itself R100 million in the process. The National Lottery gift caused an outcry in South Africa, and the festival was called a "bash" and an "expensive jamboree" by critics.

The opening ceremony was held at the Moses Moripe Stadium in Pretoria, and delegates were addressed by among others the then-president of South Africa, Jacob Zuma, whose speech focused on the value of education as a solution for the world's problems. A procession of delegations in national costume, chanting and carrying posters and banners also marched around the stadium. Some of the activities included discussion groups about various topics, concerts in the evenings, and group visits to monuments. There was a daily festival newsletter called Festival News. The bulk of the activities took place at the Tshwane Events Centre. There were 19 sessions every day (seminars, workshops and conferences).

On one of the days, the proceedings were interrupted by hundreds of COPE members arriving in buses who believed that part of the venue was reserved for a conference of their own. They eventually left again. During the first three days of the festival, there were complaints of disorganisation, lack of communication and food not being provided. Some catering companies refused to serve meals, claiming that organisers have refused to pay invoices amounting to millions of rands. A number prominent speakers did not arrive.

== See also ==
- World Festival of Youth and Students
- World Federation of Democratic Youth
