= Blind Guys =

2001 film

- Directed by: Péter Tímár
- Written by: Péter Tímár
- Produced by: Gábor Kálomista
- Starring: Mariann Kocsis
- Cinematography: Péter Szatmári
- Release date: 24 January 2001
- Running time: 118 minutes
- Country: Hungary
- Language: Hungarian

Blind Guys (Hungarian: Vakvagányok) is a 2001 Hungarian drama film directed by Péter Tímár. It was entered into the 23rd Moscow International Film Festival where it won the Prix FIPRESCI.

== Cast ==
- Mariann Kocsis as Narrator
- Jenö Csiszár as Ede
- Yvette Bozsik as Imola
- Attila Magyar as Zaki
- Anna Nagy as Fodorné, Headmaster
- Judit Matatek as Edit
- Áron Ócsvári as Erik
- Mónika Berke as Réka
