= Before the Bat's Flight Is Done =

1989 film

- Film poster
- Directed by: Péter Tímár
- Written by: Péter Tímár
- Starring: Gábor Máté
- Cinematography: Sándor Kardos
- Edited by: Péter Tímár
- Release date: 1 January 1989
- Running time: 91 minutes
- Country: Hungary
- Language: Hungarian

Before the Bat's Flight Is Done (Hungarian: Mielőtt befejezi röptét a denevér) is a 1989 Hungarian drama film directed by Péter Tímár. It was entered into the 39th Berlin International Film Festival.

== Summary ==
A teenager named Robi (Róbert Csontos) lives in a gloomy apartment building in Budapest with only his mother. His father left them when he was still a child and started a new life in Switzerland. The boy is withdrawn and quiet, finding it difficult to connect with his surroundings due to his sensitivity. He also struggles to find common ground with his mother (Erika Bodnár), as she has a very different nature, working as a cashier.

The routine of their broken family is disrupted when a man named Laci (Gábor Máté) appears. Confident and charming, Laci quickly wins over Robi's mother and soon moves in with them. He persistently tries to befriend the distant boy, but it soon becomes evident that his intentions are far from innocent. Laci is sexually attracted to Robi.

Though the mother initially throws Laci out, she later takes him back. In her shattered state of mind, she feels that this relationship might be her last chance for happiness. Tragically, she asks Robi not to reject Laci's advances, believing it would allow them all to stay together. Unable to bear the situation, the boy runs away from home, but the terrible tragedy is inevitable.

== Cast ==
- Gábor Máté as László
- Róbert Csontos as Robi
- Erika Bodnár as Teréz
- Erzsi Máthé as Felszolgáló a büfében (as Máté Erzsi)
- Dezső Garas as Zenetanár
- Péter Andorai
- Oszkár Gáti as Nyomozó
- Györgyi Kari
- Nóra Winkler
- Anna Blazovics (as Blazsovics Anna)
- Miklós Galla
- György Kölgyesi (as Kölgyesy György)
- Renáta Szatler
