= Ádám Rajhona =

Hungarian actor

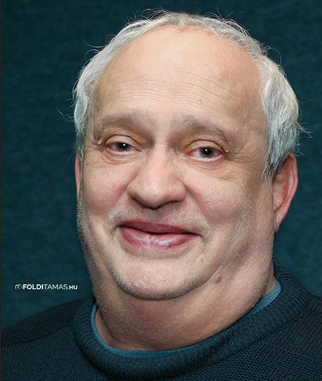
- Born: 12 December 1943; Marosvásárhely, Hungary (now Târgu Mureș, Romania)
- Died: 20 May 2016 (aged 72); Budapest, Hungary
- Occupation: Actor
- Years active: 1972–2016

Ádám Rajhona (12 December 1943 – 20 May 2016) was a Hungarian actor. He appeared in more than 90 films and television shows between 1972 and 2016.

He was a prolific dubbing actor, probably best known for voicing Christopher Lloyd (Emmett Brown) in the Hungarian dub of the Back to the Future film trilogy.

== Selected filmography ==
- Present Indicative (1972)
- The Fortress (1979)
- Sound Eroticism (1986)
- Európa expressz (1999)
