= Péter Tímár =

Hungarian film director

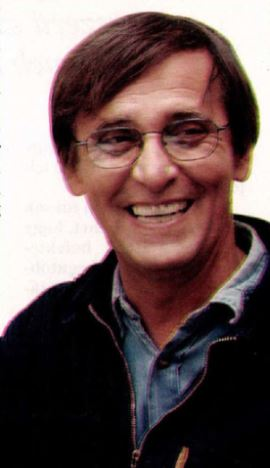
- Born: 19 December 1950 (age 75); Budapest, Hungary
- Occupations: Film director Screenwriter
- Years active: 1972-present

Péter Tímár (born 19 December 1950) is a Hungarian film director and screenwriter. He has directed 14 films since 1985. His 1989 film Before the Bat's Flight Is Done was entered into the 39th Berlin International Film Festival. His 1999 film 6:3 Play It Again Tutti was entered into the 21st Moscow International Film Festival. His 2001 film Blind Guys was entered into the 23rd Moscow International Film Festival.

== Selected filmography ==
- Sound Eroticism (1986)
- Before the Bat's Flight Is Done (1989)
- Dollybirds (1997)
- 6:3 Play It Again Tutti (1999)
- Blind Guys (2001)
