= Geoffrey Gilmore =

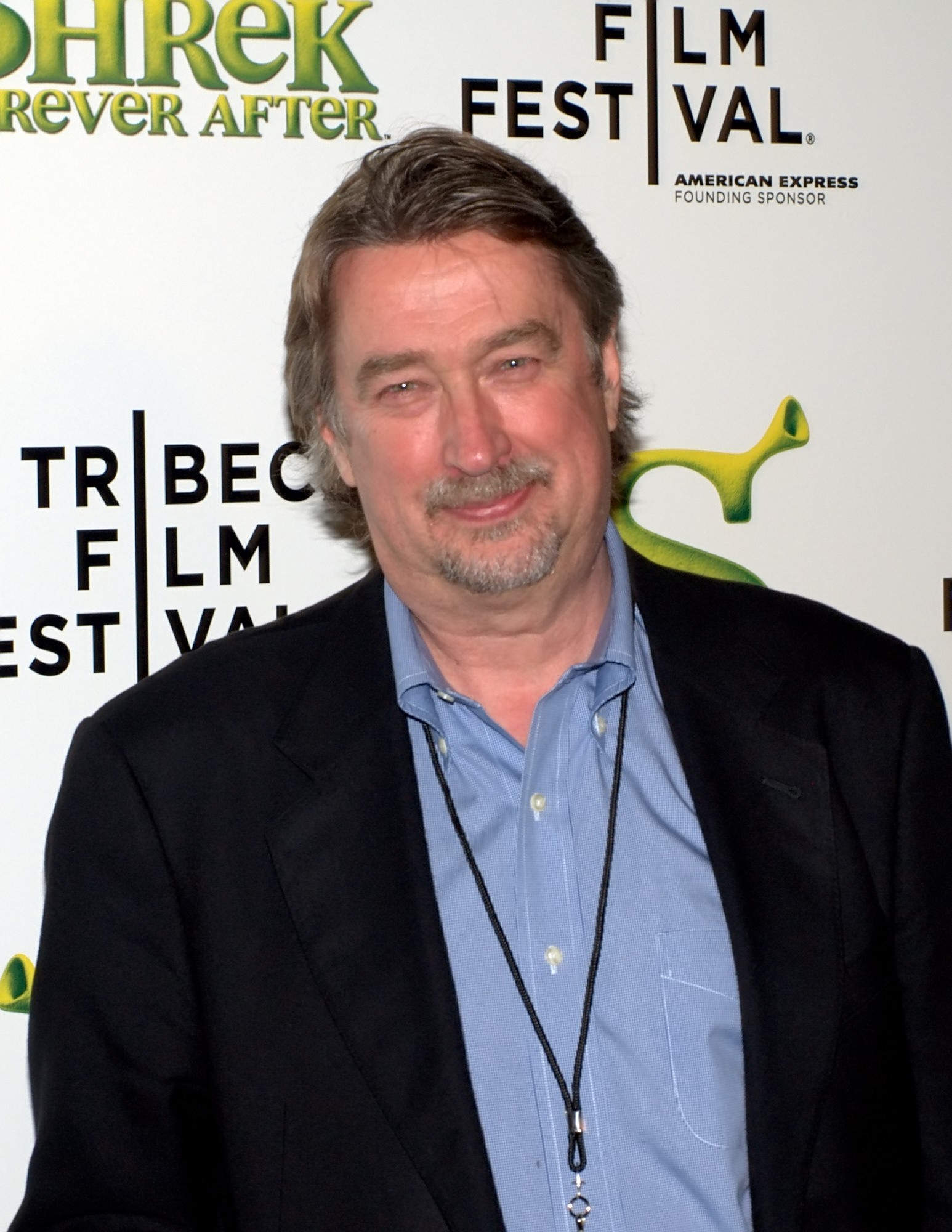
Geoffrey Gilmore at the 2010 Tribeca Film Festival

Geoffrey Gilmore is the Director of the Tribeca Film Festival and a member of the UCLA Producers Program faculty.

== Career ==
Creative Director of Tribeca Enterprises, a New York company that includes the Tribeca Film Festival, the Tribeca Cinemas and the Tribeca Film Festival Doha. He joined Tribeca after serving 19 years as the Director of the Sundance Film Festival, where he was responsible for film selection in all sections of the Festival, as well as managing the Festival and providing overall artistic direction.

Gilmore regularly presents and hosts a range of seminars and conferences about independent filmmaking and distribution in international venues including Mexico, Argentina, Japan, China, Israel, Brazil, Spain, Germany, Canada and France. Gilmore is a member of the faculty of the UCLA School of Theater, Film and Television, where he teaches in the Producers Program. He also is a Distinguished Lecturer at The Film School at Florida State University, where he teaches business trends and practices of the motion picture industry. He annually teaches a special master class for the Film Academy Baden-Württemberg, Germany, and the La Fémis, France.

Gilmore has served on numerous international film juries, including those of the Sarajevo Film Festival, the Locarno Film Festival, the Berlin International Film Festival, the Moscow Film Festival, the Shanghai Film Festival, the Jerusalem International Film Festival, and on committees ranging from the National Endowment for the Arts to the California Arts Council. For 15 years Gilmore served as head of the UCLA Film and Television Archive's Programming Department.

Gilmore holds a master's degree in Film Criticism and has written extensively on the American independent film scene. He has appeared on numerous cable and radio programs, and has served on the Board of the Independent Feature Project and on the Independent Spirit Awards Committee.

In 2001 he was a member of the jury at the 23rd Moscow International Film Festival.

== Personal life ==
Gilmore's partner is Julie le Brocquy, a filmmaker.
