= 15th World Festival of Youth and Students =

2001 youth festival in Algiers, Algeria

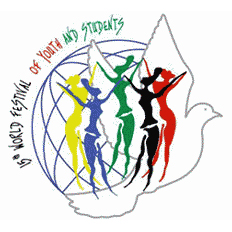
- Host country: Algeria
- Date: August 8, 2001-August 16, 2001
- Motto: Let's globalize the struggle for Peace, Solidarity, Development, against Imperialism
- Cities: Algiers
- Participants: 11,000, from 110 countries
- Follows: 14th World Festival of Youth and Students
- Precedes: 16th World Festival of Youth and Students

The 15th World Festival of Youth and Students (WFYS) was organized by the World Federation of Democratic Youth (WFDY) in Algiers, Algeria, from 8 to 16 August 2001 for nine days, under the slogan "Let's globalize the struggle for Peace, Solidarity, Development, against Imperialism". The festival was the first organized in an Arab country, as well as the first in Africa and brought together 11,000 delegates from over 100 countries from around the world. International preparatory meetings took place in Cuba, India, Cyprus and Algeria itself. The event came after the successful revival of the festival movement at the 14th World Festival of Youth and Students in Havana, Cuba, and marked a continuation of the internationalist and anti-imperialist youth festival spirit.

== From the call to the festival ==
The international festival’s movement initiated in the beginning of 1947 offered to the youth of the world a space of free expression around their preoccupations and a forum of solidarity with people searching for independence, for self determination and for development. Humanity is entering the 21st century with hopes and new aspirations, but it has to face at the same time great challenges, being aware that not all of the last centuries changes changed our lives for the better; rather, it depends on our youthful, common and joint struggle as an active power of peoples. The 15th edition of the World Festival of Youth and Students comes to strengthen the work of the last festivals, and will take place in a new millennium marked by disastrous effects of globalisation and the new restructuring of the international relations, under the slogan adopted by a consensus “Let us globalise the struggle for peace, solidarity, development, against imperialism”. This 15th WFYS also plays a great role in an era where the civil society at the international level has become an undeniable partner in taking decisions thanks to multi-form struggles led by Non Governmental Organisations which lay down them selves as a real ways and means of claiming and expressing the preoccupations of the different stratum of peoples.

== Political unrest ==
The festival took place at the conclusion of the decade-long Algerian Civil War. In the months leading up to the festival there were sustained street actions by hundreds of thousands of working people and youth in Algeria protesting repression by national police forces and supporting the struggle by the indigenous Berber people, an ethnic nationality in Algeria and throughout North Africa, for the right to be taught in their native language in school. This led to some groups to call to boycott the festival from those communities.

== Delegations ==
Over 1,000 youth from Algeria itself attended the festival including 50 students of Berber origin and whose families live in Kabylia, a region to the east of Algiers where Berbers comprise the overwhelming majority.

A number of other countries from Africa sent significant delegations, including Syria, Iraq, Lebanon, Yemen, Sudan, Egypt, and Tunisia, a first time in the history of the WFYS. A large delegation of over 400 people came with the Polisario Front from Western Sahara who raised the issue of their ongoing conflict with Morocco, organizing solidarity tents, dinners, rallies, workshops, and cultural activities about the issue which created thousands of refugees in that country.

Almost 1,000 youth were expected from the Americas with Cuba sending a delegation of 600, the largest from the region. This included 250 international students who were then going to school in Cuba, especially from Latin America, the Caribbean, and Africa; the other 350 were Cuban students and young workers. Several hundred came from Venezuela, Haiti, the Dominican Republic, the United States and Puerto Rico.

The final count for the festival was 11,000 although other sources put the event at 6,500 people.

== Stamp ==
To honour the festival, Algeria released a special stamp by artist and painter Djazia Cherrih featuring the logo of the youth festival.

== Activities ==
Most of the events were held at the Université des sciences et de la technologie Houari-Boumediene. Political themes of the conferences included peace, security, international co-operation; self-determination, sovereignty, national liberation, solidarity; democracy; development and the environment; employment; education, science, and technology; childhood; women; health; communication and culture; racism, neo-fascism and discrimination; youth's movements; the students' movement; human and peoples' rights.

The Festival aimed to be an open forum for young people to exchange experiences, work together for alternative solutions, and establish joint programs of action on a wide range issues. Topics of discussion and themes of debates included disarmament and building a nuclear-free world, the "New World Order" and NATO, as well as neo-liberal globalisation.

One day of the festival was devoted to solidarity with the people of Puerto Rico, especially the fight to get the U.S. Navy out of the island of Vieques, which was then being used as a bombing range and testing ground by the navy and United States Navy in Vieques, Puerto Rico.

A combined forum in solidarity with the struggles of the people of Cuba, Puerto Rico, Venezuela, and Colombia also took place. The panel included María Pili Hernández, representing the youth of the Fifth Republic Movement of Venezuela, the party founded by Hugo Chávez. She described changes in Venezuela's constitution and other measures by the Chávez government as an alternative example, a "third road," in the fight against imperialism.

Also discussed were questions like the eradication of racism, gender equality, HIV/AIDS and drug abuse. For example, the event featured a joint WFDY - UNESCO Conference on "the Role of Young Women in promoting culture of peace in Africa". The festival also took place on the occasion of the 35th anniversary of the founding of the Organization of Caribbean and Latin American Students (OCLAE), who noted that the student federations represented in OCLAE and at the 15th world youth festival are part of an emerging anti-imperialist youth movement that is revitalizing the organization.

Cultural activities at the festival included a series of amateur tournaments, including football, basketball, handball, a wheelchair competition, a chess match, tennis and table tennis. A series of festivals were also held including of political song, modern music, dance and mime, traditional folklore, and of film-makers.
