= 6:3 Play It Again Tutti =

1999 film

- Film poster
- Directed by: Péter Tímár
- Written by: Péter Tímár
- Produced by: Gábor Kálomista
- Starring: Károly Eperjes
- Cinematography: Péter Szatmári
- Release date: 11 February 1999
- Running time: 94 minutes
- Country: Hungary
- Language: Hungarian

6:3 Play It Again Tutti (Hungarian: 6:3 avagy, Játszd újra Tutti) is a 1999 Hungarian comedy film directed by Péter Tímár set against Hungary's historic 1953 football victory against England. It was entered into the 21st Moscow International Film Festival.

== Synopsis ==
In 1993, street cleaner Tutti is invited by a young woman to help her clean out the apartment of her recently deceased grandfather. Tutti, who was born on the eve of Hungary's legendary 3-6 victory over England in 1953, is shocked to learn that the apartment is filled with Golden Team memorabilia, including Nándor Hidegkuti's #9 jersey. Unable to resist, he takes it out of the frame and puts it on, and immediately passes out.

He awakens to realize that he was transported back in time to 1953, and the match is about to start; while he is thrilled that he'll be able to listen to the match live, his obsession with the match details causes him to get thrown out from a number of public places when he continues to spoil what's about to happen in the radio broadcast. He is eventually joined by a street sweeper called Helén, but his apparent clairvoyance and his attempt to pay with a large Hungarian forint banknote that doesn't exist yet causes people to alert the police, and Helén smuggles him into the Gellért Baths, where he is thrown into the water for predicting the results.

To get him some dry clothes, Helén takes him to a writer friend, who is currently having a meeting between a number of intellectuals; when Tutti reveals details of the upcoming Hungarian Revolution of 1956, they begin to worry that if he's captured by the State Protection Authority, he'd divulge the same details and a potential revolution would be quashed, and conspire to kill him. While visiting a café, as his hour of birth begins to draw near, Tutti begins to feel sick, as does a pregnant woman in the café. They're taken to a hospital, but as everyone is listening to the match broadcast, they're ignored: the woman gives birth, and Tutti disappears out of his clothes.

A few days later, Helén asks around the hospital asking for Tutti, but the staff tells her the only person by that name on record is the infant, who has been since abandoned by her mother. Helén decides to adopt the child.

== Cast ==
- Károly Eperjes as Rezső Boksai a.k.a. "Tutti"
- Kriszta Szalay as Helén
- Tamás Cseh as Halmi
- András Kern as Béry, writer
- Ferenc Kállai as the hairdresser
- Tamás Fodor as a writer
- László Gálffi as a writer
- Tamás Végvári as a writer
- Attila Lőte as a writer
