= Róbert Koltai =

Hungarian actor

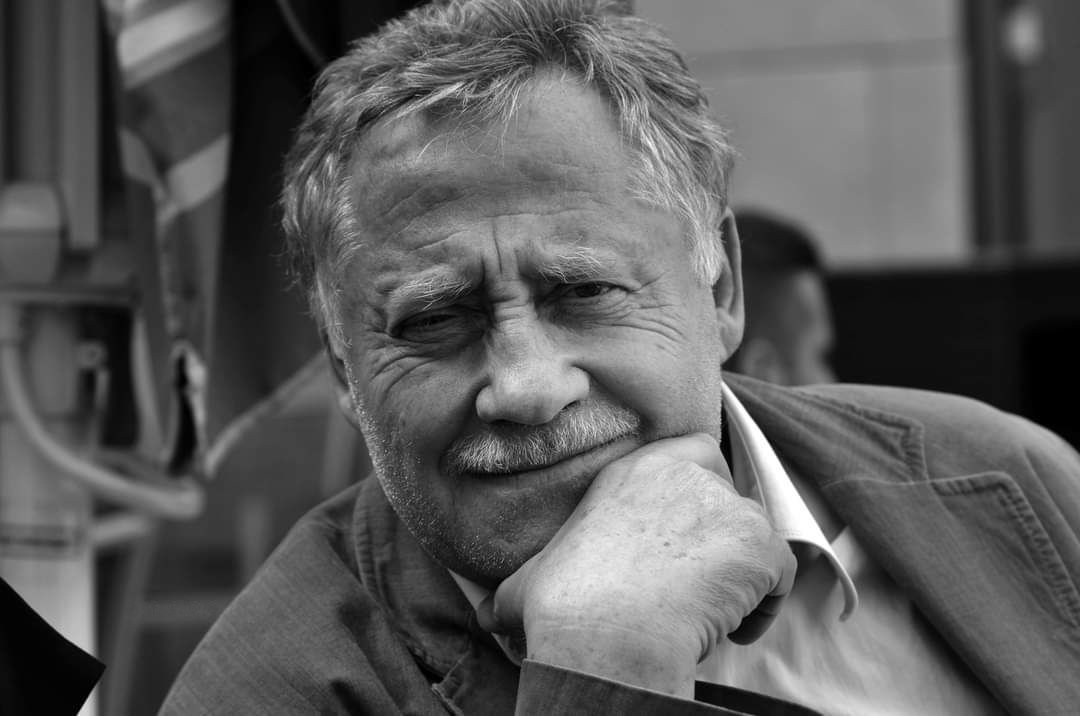
- Born: 16 December 1943 (age 82); Budapest, Hungary
- Occupations: Actor; Film director Screenwriter
- Years active: 1967–present

Róbert Koltai (born 16 December 1943) is a Hungarian actor, film director and screenwriter. He has appeared in over 90 films since 1967. He appeared in the 1976 film Man Without a Name, which was entered into the 26th Berlin International Film Festival, where it won the Silver Bear for an outstanding single achievement. He also appeared in Béla Tarr's 1981 film, The Prefab People. From the 1990s onwards, Koltai also worked as a successful film director.

== Selected filmography ==
- Man Without a Name (1976)
- The Train Killer (1983)
- Sound Eroticism (1986)
- Love, Mother (1987)
- Memories of a River (1990)
- We Never Die (1993)
- Samba (1996)
- Out of Order (1997)
