= Anikó Ungár =

Hungarian magician (born 1949)

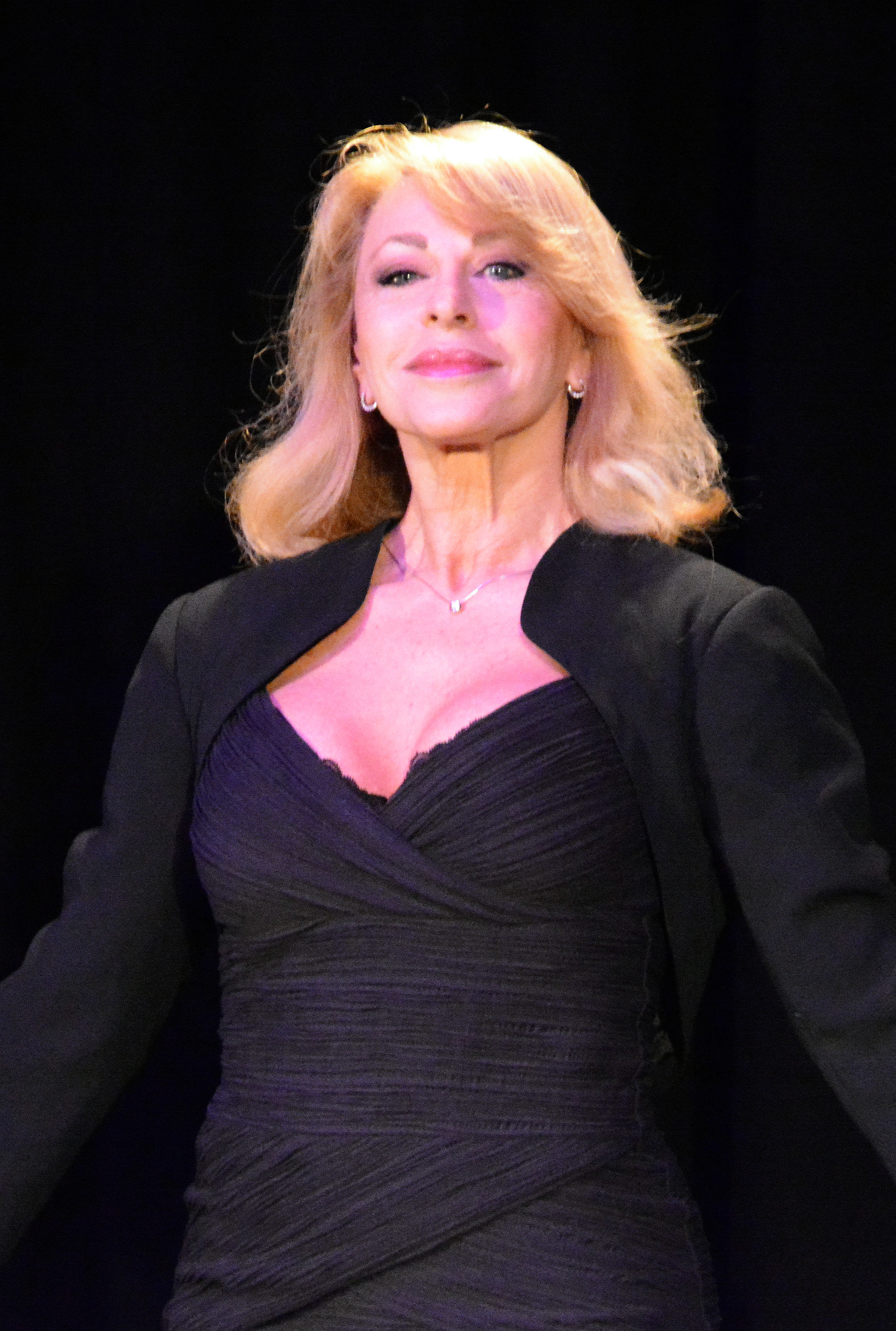
- Born: 11 January 1949; Budapest, Hungary
- Occupation(s): Illusionist, magician
- Spouse: Zsolt Baronits
- Relatives: Gábor Baronits (son)

Anikó Ungár (born 11 January 1949) is a Hungarian magician. She lives in Buda with her husband who is a banker.
