= Irina Otieva =

Iryna Otieva Իրինա Օտիևա
- Born: Irina Otyan; November 22, 1958 (age 67); Tbilisi, Georgian SSR, USSR

Irina Adolfovna Otieva (born 22 November 1958, Tbilisi) is a Soviet and Russian jazz and pop singer, Honoured Artist of Russia (1997), winner of international competitions, jazz performer, composer, songwriter. Her vocal range spans three and a half octaves.

== Biography ==
Born on 22 November 1958 in Tbilisi, Georgian SSR, into an Armenian family.

Otieva is a Russified Armenian surname derived from Otyan or Otyan. She originates from the ancient dynasty of Armenian princes Amatuni.
