= 9th World Festival of Youth and Students =

1968 youth festival in Sofia, People's Republic of Bulgaria

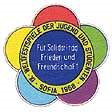
- Host country: People's Republic of Bulgaria
- Dates: 28 July - 5 August 1968
- Motto: For Solidarity, Peace and Friendship
- Cities: Sofia
- Participants: 20,000 people from 142 countries
- Follows: 8th World Festival of Youth and Students
- Precedes: 10th World Festival of Youth and Students

The 9th World Festival of Youth and Students was held from 28 July to 5 August 1968 in Sofia, capital city of the then People's Republic of Bulgaria. The festival attracted 20,000 people from 138 countries.

== Organisation and events ==
Initially, the event was planned to be held in Algeria in the summer of 1965, but due to the military coup in that country the date was postponed, and Bulgaria became the new venue for the festival.

The festival took place at the height of the Chinese Cultural Revolution, and due to the Sino-Soviet split, no Chinese delegates were invited to Bulgaria. However, a group of German Maoists attended. They disrupted the opening ceremony of the festival, shouting the name of Chairman Mao and waving his portrait.

It was rumored by local fans that The Beatles offered to play at the festival, but it was turned down by the organising committee. The festival featured performances by Yugoslav rock bands Elipse and Mladi Levi. Since the two groups had similar musical directions, both playing rhythm and blues and soul, they decided to have a joint performance, playing at a park situated in the city centrum. As soon as the performance had started, the audience started clapping their hands to the rhythm of the music, which provoked the Bulgarian police to stop the performance after ten minutes and brutally attack the audience. Despite the incident, Elipse got the silver medal for the second best music performance.

The song "Ogromnoe nebo" ("Tremendous Sky"), performed by Edita Piekha, received several awards: a gold medal and first place in a political song contest, a gold medal for performance and poetry, as well as a silver medal for music.
