= Ildikó Tóth (actress) =

Hungarian actress (born 1966)

- Born: 29 August 1966 (age 60); Hatvan, Hungary
- Occupations: Actress; choreographer
- Years active: 1985–present

Ildikó Tóth (born 29 August 1966) is a Hungarian film/stage actress and choreographer. She has appeared in more than thirty films since 1985.

At the 2023 Hungarian Film Festival, she won best supporting actress for her role in the Hungarian film Blokád (Blockade).

== Selected filmography ==
Year	Title	Role	Notes
1995	Magic Hunter	Lina	
1997	Dollybirds	Olga	
2006	Relatives	Lina	
2012	The Door	Doctor	
2018	A színésznö	Ildikó, Piroska	
2018	Love me not	Nurse	
2019	Csak színház és más semmi	Köhalmi Zsóka	TV series, 1 episode
2020	Land of the brave	Csizmadia Zsuzsanna	TV series, 59 episodes
2020	Segítség! Itthon vagyok!	Nóra	TV series, 7 episodes
2020	Shakespeare 37		TV series, 1 episode
2020	Post Mortem	Ilus	
2022	Az énekesnõ	Bírónõ	
2022	Magasságok és mélységek	Tapolyai Emöke	
2022	Emberszag		
2022	Blokád	Antall Józsefné, Fülepp Klára	
2024	Tavasz	Hölgy	

== Stage acting ==
Year	Title	Role	Notes
2024	Light and Desire	soloist	
