= Sound Eroticism =

- Directed by: Péter Tímár
- Starring: Ádám Rajhona; Róbert Koltai
- Release date: 10 July 1986
- Running time: 1h 34min
- Country: Hungary
- Language: Hungarian

Sound Eroticism (Hungarian: Egészséges erotika) is a 1986 Hungarian comedy film directed by Péter Tímár.

== Synopsis ==
Fireman Bozodi arrives to a countryside factory manufacturing wooden crates; headed by foreman Falkay, the factory, consisting entirely of women, has been producing a massive surplus of unwanted crates which it is struggling to sell. Looking to benefit from the obvious apathy, Bozodi convinces Falkay to install a surveillance camera into the women's dressing room; they then invite business partners to view the live feed of women disrobing, under the condition that they purchase large amounts of crates, causing the business to suddenly surge.

While decorating for an August 20 national holiday event, the women accidentally discover the camera, organize a strike and take Bozodi and Falkay hostage, demanding answers from the president of the company, who has just arrived for the holiday celebration. The president, hoping to distract from the incident, enlists his friend, the local fire chief, to set fire to the back of the factory, assuming the fire will cause the women to flee. Unfortunately, due to the combination of wooden crates quickly catching fire and Bozodi using the fire extinguishers to smuggle petrol, the factory quickly burns to the ground.

== Cast ==
- Ádám Rajhona - Falkay Gábor, foreman
- Róbert Koltai - Bozodi János, fireman
- Péter Haumann - President
- Judit Németh - Hajdúné
- Kata Kristóf - Ibike
- Györgyi Kari - University student
- István Mikó - Secretary of the Party
- József Sótonyi - Doc
- György Hunyadkürthy - Fire chief
- Frigyes Hollósi
- János Derzsi

== Production ==
The film was Péter Tímár's directorial debut; the script came together as a combination of his previous short films, and stories he heard from producer Péter Bacsó. He decided to shoot film with actors acting out the scenes backwards; the footage was then flipped during edit, causing the actors to act in an odd jerky motion resembling of early silent movies; while initially apprehensive, he was relieved to find that the actors found the dailies hilarious. Tímár also composed music of the film on a single drum machine and cut it on analogue tape, which he found appropriate for a film about a factory.
