= János Gálvölgyi =

Hungarian actor and comedian

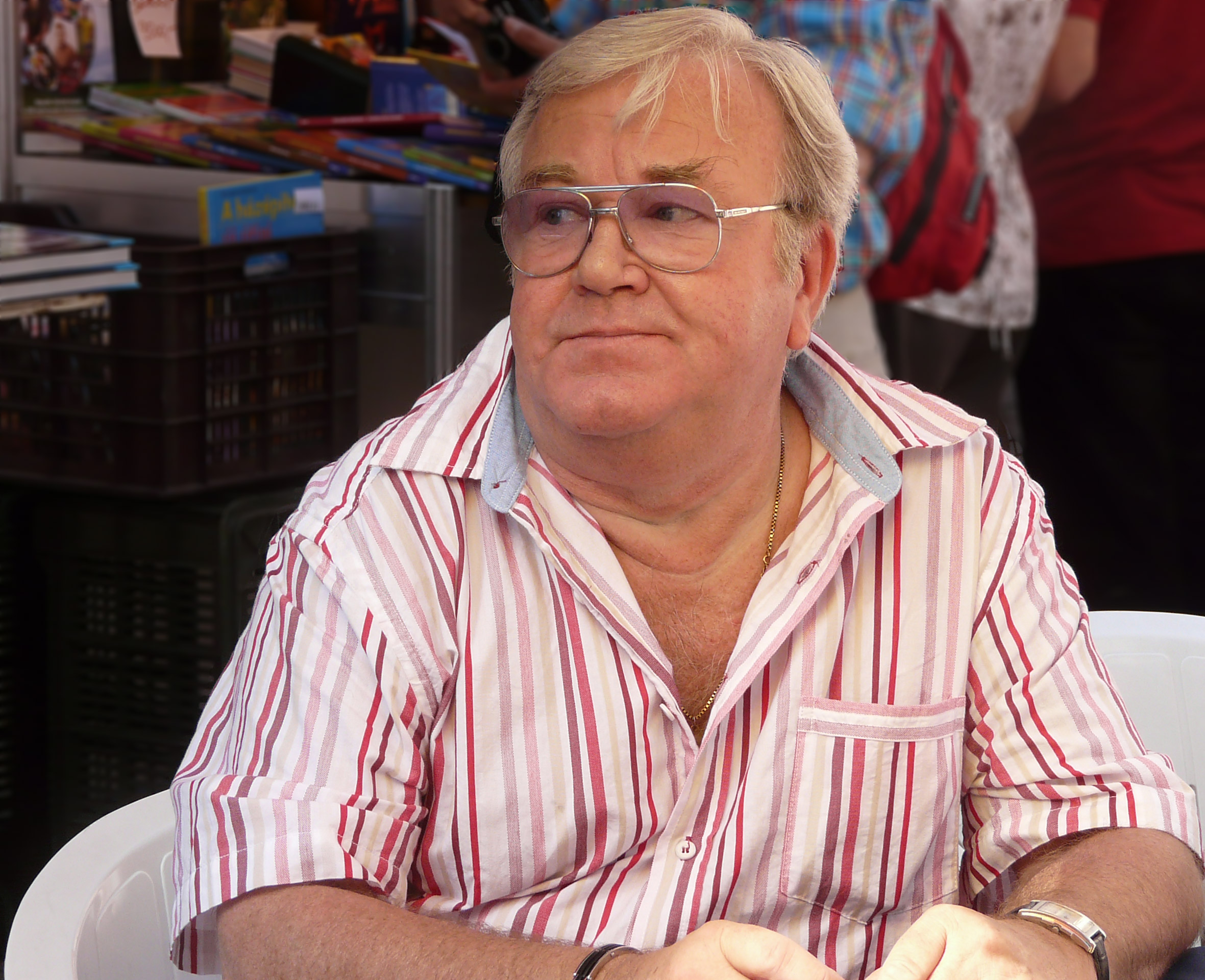
- Born: 26 May 1948 (age 78); Budapest, Hungary
- Occupations: Comedian; actor
- Years active: 1970–present
- Children: 2

János Gálvölgyi (born 26 May 1948) is a Hungarian actor and comedian. First appearing in 1968's Ki Mit Tud? talent show, he gained national fame for making numerous comedy sketches in the Hungarian National Television, becoming one of the best known comedy actors in the country.

== Biography ==
János Gálvölgyi was born on 26 May 1948 in Budapest as the son of János Gálvölgyi and Mária Gumbinger.

After finishing the Madách Imre High School, he tried but failed to enroll to the University of Theatre. He learned photography, and worked in the Révai Press company between 1967-68. Always dreaming of theatric success, he applied to the Ki Mit Tud?, a televised national talent show with a comedic sketch, gaining great success.

To the advice of the jury, he now successfully applied to the University of Theatre. Finishing in 1973, he began working in the Thália theatre, where he worked until 1993, when he joined the Madách Theatre. Since the 1970s, he frequently appeared in television with sketches, collaborations and own shows both on the National channel and later on commercial stations, the most known of these being Gálvölgyi Show. He also appeared in and voiced numerous movies and television films.

== Notable awards ==
- Jászai Mari Award (1981)
- Meritorious Artist of Hungary (2000)
- Order of Merit of the Republic of Hungary, Officer's Cross (2002)
- Kossuth Prize (2005)

== Sources ==
- - János Gálvölgyi in the Hungarian Theatrical Lexicon (György, Székely. Magyar Színházművészeti Lexikon. Budapest: Akadémiai Kiadó, 1994. ISBN 9789630566353), freely available on mek.oszk.hu
- Róbert, Rátonyi. A Gálvölgyi. Budapest : Duna International Könyvkiadó, 2002. ISBN 9639163538
