= World Festival of Youth and Students =

World international youth event

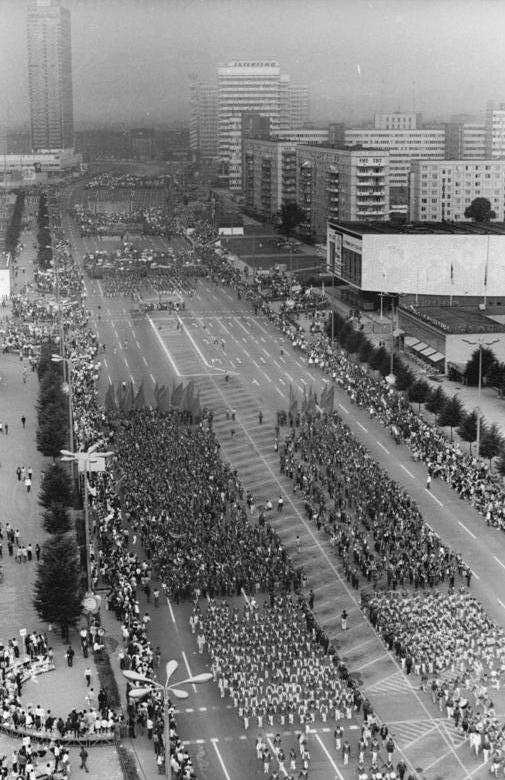
The 10th World Festival of Youth and Students in East Berlin in 1973

The World Festival of Youth and Students is an international event organized by the World Federation of Democratic Youth (WFDY) and the International Union of Students after 1947.

== History ==
The festival has been held occasionally since 1947, mainly in communist states, as an event of global youth solidarity for democracy and against war and imperialism. The largest festival was the 6th, held in 1957 in Moscow, when 34,000 young people from 131 countries attended the event. This festival also marked the international debut of the song "Moscow Nights", which subsequently went on to become a widely recognized Russian song. There were no festivals between 1962 and 1968, as events proposed in Algeria and then Ghana were cancelled due to coups and political turmoil in both countries. Until the 19th festival in Sochi, Russia, in 2017 (with 185 countries participating), the largest festival by number of countries with participants was the 13th, held in 1989 in Pyongyang when 177 countries attended the event.

The most recent festival took place in Sochi, Russia, from 13 to 22 October 2017.

== Editions ==
Edition	Year	Logo	Country	Host city	Participants	No. of countries represented	Motto	Athletics competition
1st	1947		Czechoslovakia	Prague	17,000	71	"Youth Unite, Forward for Lasting Peace!"	Yes
2nd	1949		Hungary	Budapest	20,000	82	"Youth Unite, Forward for Lasting Peace, Democracy, National Independence and a better future for the people"	Yes
3rd	1951		East Germany	East Berlin	26,000	104	"For Peace and Friendship – Against Nuclear Weapons"	Yes
4th	1953		Romania	Bucharest	30,000	111	"No! Our generation will not serve death and destruction!."	Yes
5th	1955		Poland	Warsaw	30,000	114	"For Peace and Friendship – Against the Aggressive Imperialist Pacts"	Yes
6th	1957		Soviet Union	Moscow	34,000	131	"For Peace and Friendship"	Yes
7th	1959		Austria	Vienna	18,000	112	"For Peace and Friendship and Peaceful Coexistence"	Yes
8th	1962		Finland	Helsinki	18,000	137	"For Peace and Friendship"	Yes
9th	1968		Bulgaria	Sofia	20,000	138	"For Solidarity, Peace and Friendship"	
10th	1973		East Germany	East Berlin	25,600	140	"For Anti-Imperialist Solidarity, Peace and Friendship"	
11th	1978		Cuba	Havana	18,500	145	"For Anti-Imperialist Solidarity, Peace and Friendship"	
12th	1985		Soviet Union	Moscow	26,000	157	"For Anti-Imperialist Solidarity, Peace and Friendship"	
13th	1989		North Korea	Pyongyang	22,000	180	"For Anti-Imperialist Solidarity, Peace and Friendship"	
14th	1997		Cuba	Havana	12,325	136	"For Anti-Imperialist Solidarity, Peace and Friendship"	
15th	2001		Algeria	Algiers	6,500	110	"Let’s Globalize the Struggle For Peace, Solidarity, Development, Against Imperialism"	
16th	2005		Venezuela	Caracas	17,000	144	"For Peace and Solidarity, We Struggle Against Imperialism and War"	
17th	2010		South Africa	Pretoria	15,000	126	"Let's Defeat Imperialism, for a World of Peace, Solidarity and Social Transformation!"	
18th	2013		Ecuador	Quito	8,500	80	"Youth Unite Against Imperialism, for a World of Peace, Solidarity and Social Transformation!"	
19th	2017		Russia	Sochi	30,000	185	"For peace, solidarity and social justice, we struggle against imperialism. Honoring our past, we build the future!"	
20th	TBD		Venezuela	Caracas	TBD	TBD	"For Peace and Solidarity, we fight against Imperialism and war"	

== Gallery ==
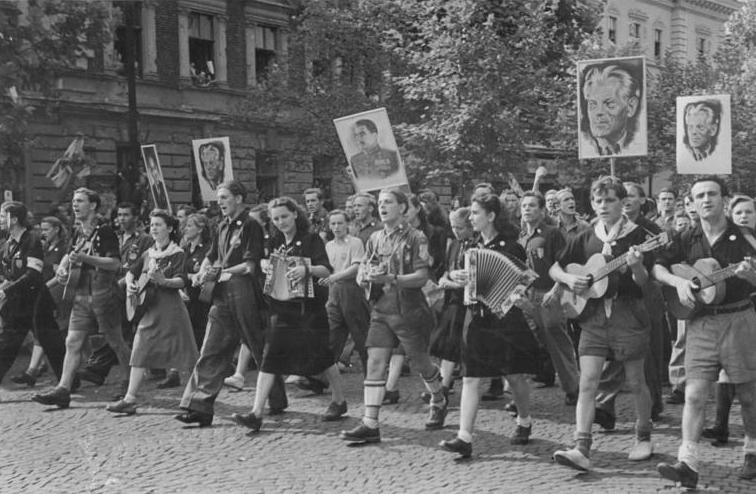
1949, Budapest.

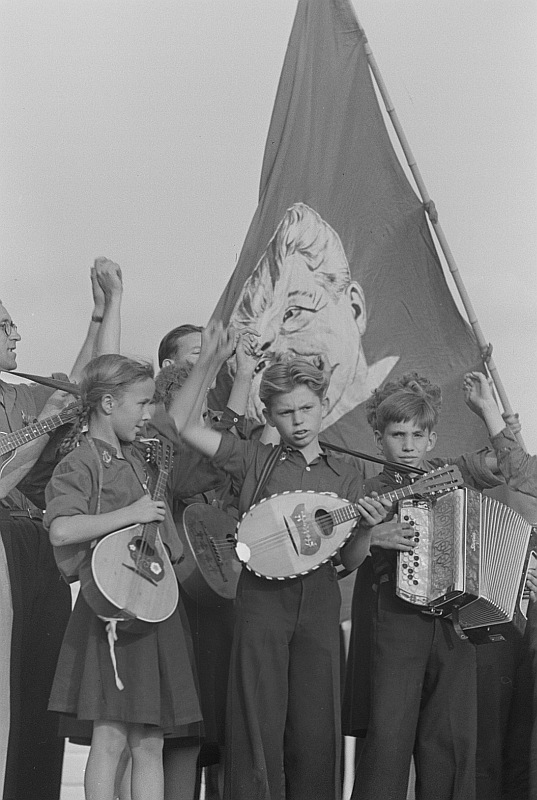
1951, East Berlin, children holding mandolins and accordion in front of a flag (with Stalin's face).

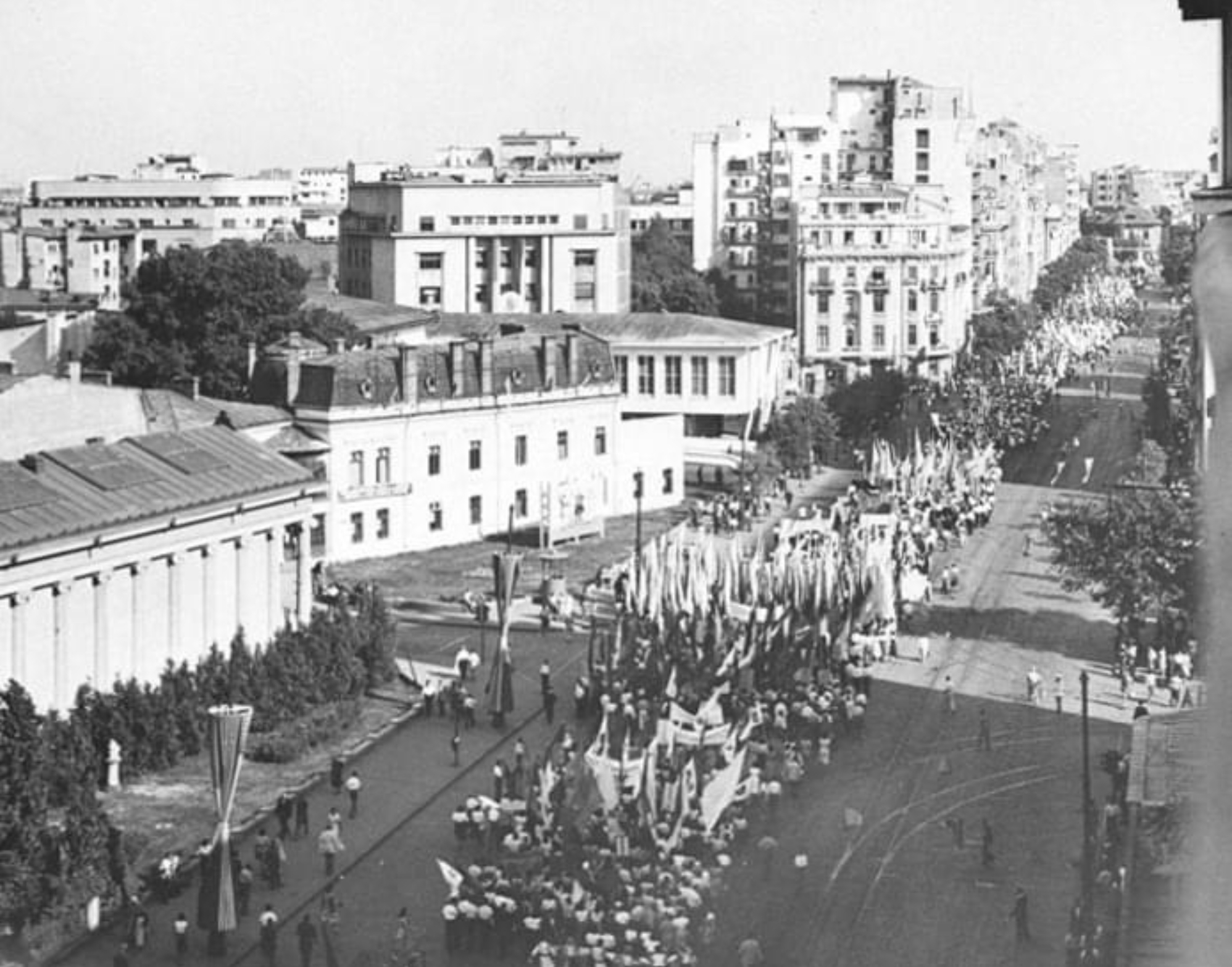
1953, Bulevardul Magheru in Bucharest

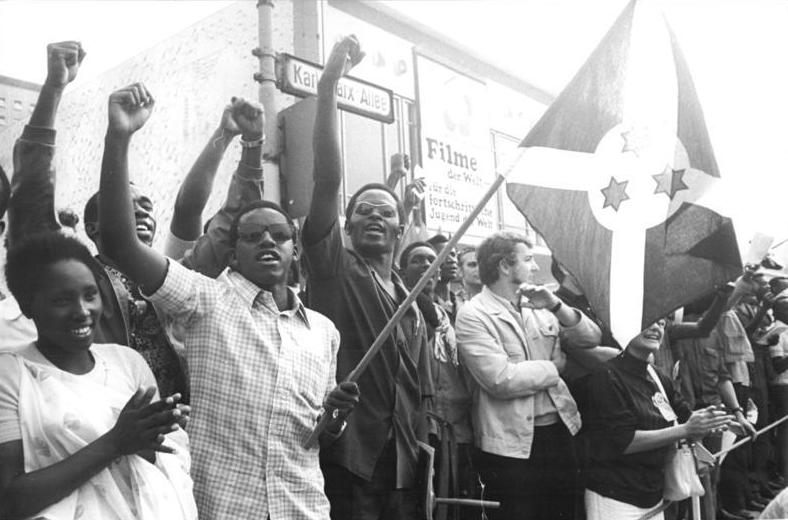
1973, East Berlin: delegates from Burundi

== See also ==
- FISU World University Games
- Medjugorje International Youth Festival
- World Festival of Youth (2024)
