= Krejcarová =

Krejcarová may refer to:

- Jana Černá, born Jana Krejcarová, 1928–1981, Czech poet and writer
- Milena Jesenská, also known as Milena Krejcarová, 1896–1944, Czech journalist, writer, editor and translator
