= Růžena Jesenská =

Czech decadent writer (1863–1940)

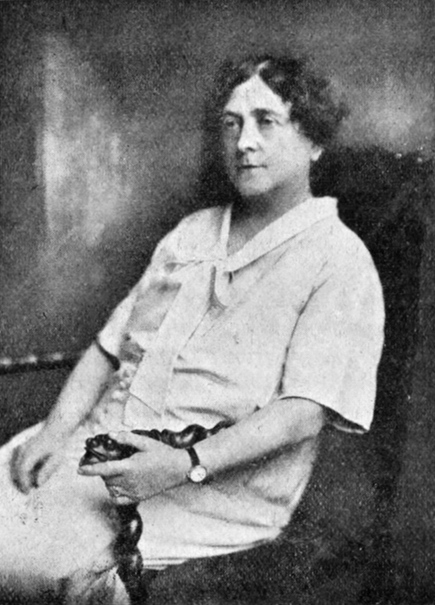
- Růžena Jesenská in c. 1930
- Born: 17 June 1863; Prague, Bohemia, Austrian Empire
- Died: 14 July 1940 (aged 77); Prague, Czechoslovakia

Růžena Jesenská (17 June 1863 – 14 July 1940) was a Czech decadent writer. She was a follower of Julius Zeyer. She was a member of the Czech Academy of Sciences (elected 1929), and was aunt of writer Milena Jesenská. Jesenská wrote novels, plays, short stories, children's books, and over 50 collections of poetry. Although few works by Czech women writers have been translated into English, writers, such as Jesenská, were widely published and read.

== Biography ==
Růžena Jesenská was born in 1863 in Prague, into a family of many children and was the oldest daughter of an official who later became a businessman. She began training as a teacher in 1878 at St. Thomas Girls' school in Prague, the same school she attended as a girl, and later taught at various schools in Prague. At the Fin de siècle in 1907, she was forced to retire from teaching and entered a career in journalism.

Jesenská traveled extensively through the Baltic countries, France, Italy, and Russia and published under the pseudonyms, Eva Z Hluboké and Martin Věžník. Her first novella was published in the journal, Světozor, under the male pseudonym, Martin Věžník. She first wrote didactic literature for girls and young women before writing poems, drama, and novels, including 3 biographical novels. Her writing largely excludes the sentimentalism found in other Czech women's writing of the 1880s, and instead, she incorporates symbolism through "truncated images and syntax." Critic Jan Opolsky describes her writing as "against the current," and Max Brod critiqued "her chauvinistic Czech attitudes and philistine outlook."

== Teaching ==
She completed her studies in 1882 with a mandatory two-year internship, which she started in Mladá Boleslav and completed her high school diploma in 1884. According to the regulations at that time, teachers were not allowed to marry and have children of their own, so as not to neglect their students. In 1889, Jesenská transferred to the Lesser Town Municipal School at St. Thomas in Prague and taught there until her early retirement in 1907.

== Selected works ==
=== Poetry ===
==== Rudé západy (Crimson Sunsets, 1904) ====
At her own expensive, Jesenská published this collection of poems which constitute "a sensualist hymn to sexual passion." There is suspicion among critics that these poems describe her secret relationship with painter and photographer, Alfons Mucha.

Mladi (1926)

Jesenská accounts for "moral confrontations and animosities that affected advancement in her career" in this autobiographical collection of poems.

=== Prose ===
==== Jarmila (1894) and its sequel, Jarní píseň (Song of Spring, 1902) ====
These novels provide manuals of etiquette for bourgeois young women.

==== Román dítěte (Romance of a Child, 1905) ====
In this psychological study of girl entering prostitution, Jesenská explores love as "an inspiration for vitality" and the power of rejected love to mentally and physically destroy.

==== Mimo svět (A World Apart, 1909) ====
Jesenská's volume of 14 stories with narration that is often wooden and melodramatic. Many center around topics of incest, oppressive lesbian love, and present the woman as a victim. Decadent themes and motifs presented include "the outsider, ‘abnormal’ sexuality, and the association of sex and death." This volume inspired the title of Kathleen Hayes' anthology, A world apart and other stories: Czech women writers at the Fin de siècle.

==== Tanecnice (The Dancer, 1912) ====
Jesenská paints a psychologically-detailed portrait of the first-person-narrator heroine.

=== Plays ===
==== Estera (1909) ====
Estera is a symbolist tragedy set in Renaissance Bohemia and composed in iambic pentameters.

Attila (published and performed 1919)

Attila is a Neo-Romantic play that concerns the battle between passion (Germanic) and love (Slav).

== Other contributions ==
Jesenská published in newspapers for women, including Ženské listy, Ženský obzor and Časopis učitelek. She was briefly a theater critic for Ženský svět (Women's World) in 1921. Founded prior to World War I, these periodicals covering "the woman question" moved discussions of women and gender into the cultural sphere.

Jesenská was a regular contributor to the Czech literary magazine, Zlatá Praha, and edited the children's periodical, Dětské Besedy Máje (Children's Maytime chat).

== See also ==
- Jesenský family
