= Jeszenszky (surname) =

Jeszenszky is a Hungarian language surname. It may refer to:

- Members of two Hungarian noble families House of Jeszenszky
- Béla Tibor Jeszenszky (1962–2008), Hungarian singer
- Ferenc Jeszenszky (1905–1990), Hungarian economist, during 1949–52 was a president of the Hungarian National Bank
- Géza Jeszenszky (born 1941), Hungarian politician, in 1990–94 foreign minister of Hungary
