= Öcsi =

Öcsi may refer to:

- Puskás Öcsi (1927–2006), Hungarian footballer
- Flipper Öcsi
