= Jeszenszky =

House of Jeszenszky
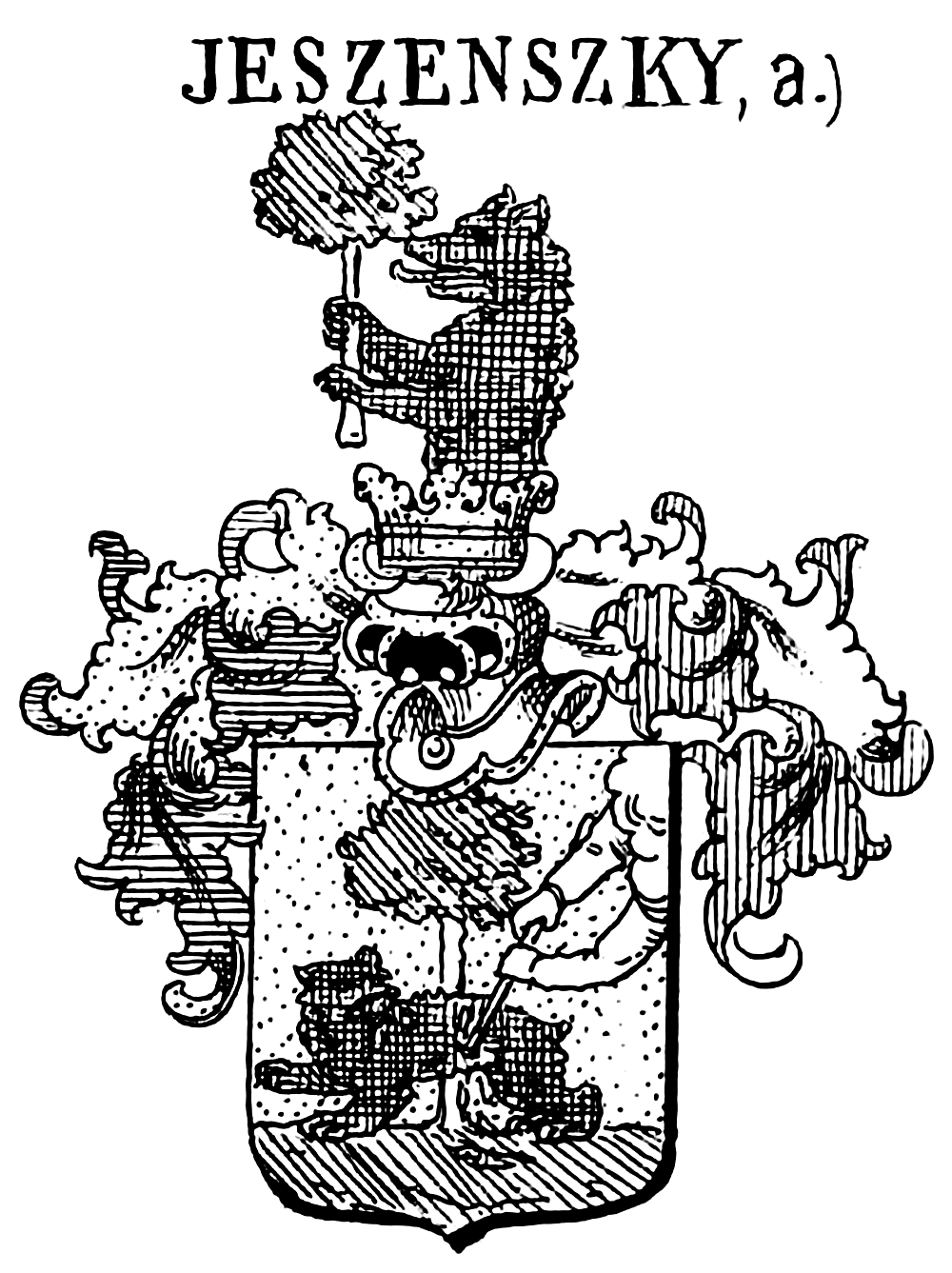
- Country: Kingdom of Hungary
- Founded: 1255 (Kisjeszen branch); 1278 (Nagyjeszen branch)
- Founder: András Temérdek (Kisjeszen branch); Mágya (Nagyjeszen branch)
- Cadet branches: Kisjeszen branch Nagyjeszen branch

The Jeszenszky family or Jesenský (also Jessensky, Jessinsky, Jessensky de Gross Jessen) is the name of two old noble families in the Kingdom of Hungary. They have a mutual name but their origins are different.

== Kisjeszen family ==
The first known ancestor of the Kisjeszen (Minor Jeszen) family was the castle warrior András Temérdek who received lands in Turóc County (Slovak: Turiec) from king Béla IV of Hungary in 1255. The family introduced their new surname after the name of a village "Jeszen" (Jaseno, now Turčianske Jaseno). In the 14th century the family used the "Kisjeszeni" ("de Kisjeszen") name form and the Slovak variant of their name "Jeszenszky" came into use from the 15th century.

== Nagyjeszen family ==
The first known member of the Nagyjeszen (Major Jeszen) family was called Mágya. In 1278 Mágya received his noble title, because of his valor in the Battle on the Marchfeld.

== Famous members of the families ==
Ladislaus Jesenský died in 1526 during the catastrophic Battle of Mohács. Subsequently, all Jesenský property was confiscated by the advancing Ottomans, so brothers Melchior, Lorenz and Balthasar Jesenský moved to Silesia (then part of the Crown of Bohemia) and lived in Wrocław and Świdnica from 1541 onward. Balthasar's son was Ján Jesenský, known as Jan Jesenius, famous scientist and politician who lived and died in Prague, Bohemia.

Branches of the families are still living in Slovakia, the Czech Republic, Hungary, United States and England.

Important family members:

- Jan Jesenius (1566–1621), Bohemian physician, philosopher and politician, rector of Charles University in Prague
- Růžena Jesenská (1863–1940), Czech novelist
- Jan Jesenský (1870–1947), Czech scientist, professor of Charles University
- Janko Jesenský (1874–1945), Slovak poet, prose writer and translator
- Milena Jesenská (1896–1944), Czech journalist and translator, friend of Franz Kafka
- Jan Jesenský Jr. (1904–1942), Czech scientist, assistant professor of Charles University
- Ferenc Jeszenszky (1905–1990), Hungarian economist, during 1949–52 was a president of Hungarian National Bank in Budapest
- Géza Jeszenszky (1941–), Hungarian politician, in 1990–94 foreign minister of Hungary

== See also ==
- Jeszenszky (surname)
- List of titled noble families in the Kingdom of Hungary

== Sources ==
- Jan Jesenius and his family's short bio (Hungarian)
