= Knabenau =

Baltic German noble family

The House of Knabenau or von Knabenau (also known as Barons von Knabenau) is an ancient Baltic-German noble family of German origin, settling in Courland in mid 17th c.

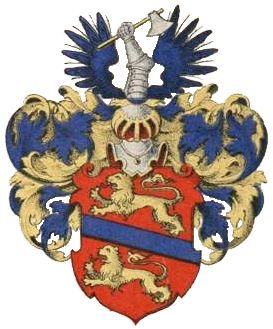
coat of arms of the Barons von Knabenau

== History ==
In 1685 Polish King John III Sobieski Captain grants an Indygenat to Georg von Knabenau. In the decree on the resignation of December 31, 1822, Colonel Friedrich Johann von Knabenau was named as Baron. On May th 18 1834 the Russian Imperial Senat granted Knabenau permission to use the title of Baron. Judgment of 05/16/1841, at approved the introduction in which noble family von Knabenau, natives of the county Piltene (Courland), allowed to be officially was matriculated in Courland knighthood. Baron dignity approved for name von Knabenau, government decrees Senate Courland noble Committee of 10 June 1853 and 28 February 1862 in pursuance of the Supreme Decree of 10 June 1853 and 28 February 1862 years (see the statement of the Senate 1853,1862).

== Coat of arms ==
=== Family coat of arms ===
Gules a sloping bend Azure between two lions passant Or. Upon a helmet correspondent to the armiger’s degree, that is, a tournament helmet or a great helm, for the crest, an arm proper vambraced Argent, brandishing a battle-axe of the same, handle Or, blade backwards, between wings Azure. Mantling Azure doubled Or.

== Possessions ==
- Neu-Sallensee Manor, purchased in 1839 and Groß-Born Manor in Courland (now Latvia), and the Klingenberg Manor, which was located 70 km from Riga, the modern capital of Latvia.
- Bagdoniškė Manor; Berghof Manor, acquired by Johann Friedrich Otto Baron von Knabenau in Vilna Governorate (now Lithuania).

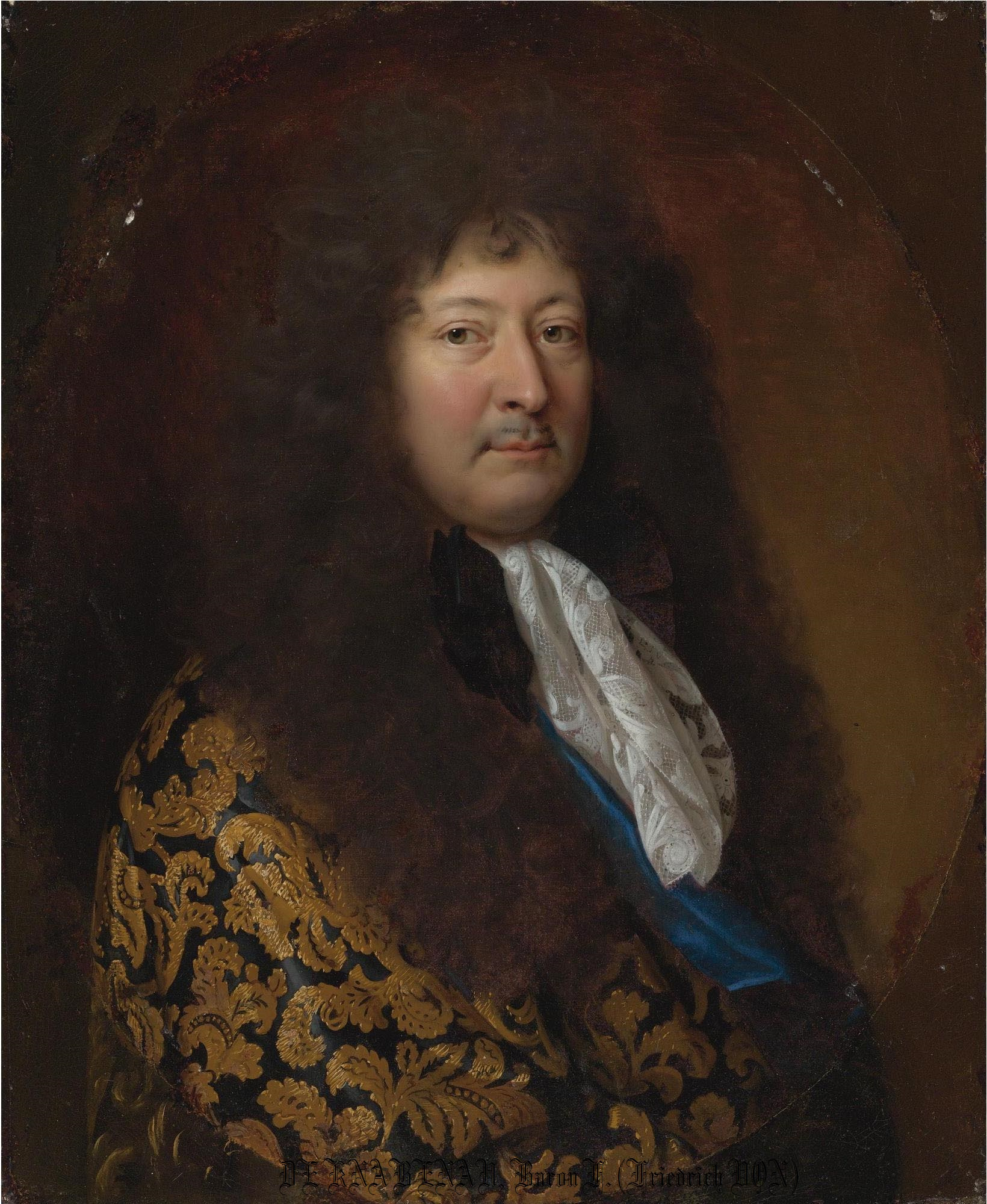
Friedrich Baron von Knabenau

== Notable family members ==
- Friedrich Baron von Knabenau (1651 – d.) Baron, was a Swedish colonel and member of the Privy Council
- Johann Friedrich von Knabenau (?-d. 29/10/1845) – Baron, Dec. 1815 staff-captain Novgorod cuirassier regiment; August, 1817 captain of the L.- Guards Hussars; in October, 1817 transferred to lieutenant colonel in Starodubsky Cuirassier Regiment; later on Retired Colonel (retired by decree on December 31, 1821). Taught high school students in the dressage arena on horseback courtiers reserve squadron in Tsarskoye Selo Lyceum (1816–1817)
- Georg Gotthard (Jerzy) von Knabenau (1723–1798) Baron, the captain of the troops of the Crown (1760). In 1764 he supported the candidacy of Stanislaw August Poniatowski to occupy the throne of the Commonwealth. From 1765 – Colonel troops crown. In 1767, he was close to the king and became his chamberlain. Commander of the Order of St. Stanislaus 1789. Died in Warsaw in 1798.
- Dorothea von Knabenau (de Chassepot de PISSY, countess)(1779–1848) was maid of honor of the Duchess of Courland. Johann Wolfgang von Goethe was in love with her.

== Sources ==
- Neues allgemeines deutsches Adels-Lexicon
- Carl Arvid Klingspor: Baltisches Wappenbuch. Stockholm 1882, S. 48–61
- Georg Gotthard (Jerzy) von Knabenau
- Dorothea von Knabenau (de Chassepot de PISSY, countess)
- Johann Friedrich von Knabenau (?-d. 29/10/1845)
- Bruno W. Häuptli (2007). "Thomas I. von Breslau (Neiße)". In Bautz, Traugott (ed.). Biographisch-Bibliographisches Kirchenlexikon (BBKL) (in German). Vol. 27. Nordhausen: Bautz. cols. 1405–1409. ISBN 978-3-88309-393-2.
