= List of titled noble families in the Kingdom of Hungary =

The following is a list of titled noble families in the Kingdom of Hungary.

== Dukes and princes ==
Name	Coat-of-arms	Year of grant of the Hungarian title	Naturalization in Hungary	Remarks	References
Auersperg			Article 118 of 1655	Imperial baron: 1573; imperial count: 1630, 1673; imperial prince: 1653, 1791. A branch of the family continued to bear the title of count. Act VIII of 1886 confirmed the hereditary seat of Count Johann Weikhard of Auersperg's descendants at the Upper House of the Diet of Hungary.	
Batthyány-Strattmann				A branch of the Batthyány family. Bohemian prince: 1763; imperial prince: 1764. The Batthyány-Strattman name was conferred upon Károly József Batthyány in 1755. After the line descending from him died out, the name and the title of prince were granted to László Batthyány in 1915. The Batthyány-Strattmanns' hereditary seat at the Upper House of the Diet of Hungary was confirmed by Act VIII of 1886.	
Cillei (†)				Imperial count: 1341, 1372; imperial prince: 1436 (confirmed in 1443). Hermann II, Count of Celje received domains in Slavonia in 1397 and styled himself count of Zagorje in reference to them. The family extinguished in 1456.	
Coburg–Koháry			Article 71 of 1790/91, article 41 of 1827	A branch of the House of Saxe-Coburg and Gotha (from the House of Wettin). The last kings of Portugal and tsars of Bulgaria were descended from this family. Nowadays, the members of the family name themselves Sachsen–Coburg und Gotha. Act VIII of 1886 confirmed the hereditary seat of Prince Ferdinand of Saxe-Coburg and Gotha's descendants at the Upper House of the Diet of Hungary.	
Corvinus (†)		1479 (Duke of Liptó)		An illegitimate branch of the royal Hunyadi family. Count: 1479; duke of Troppau. The family extinguished in 1505.	
Czartoryski			Article 6 of 1805.	Imperial prince: 1433 (confirmed in 1442, 1569 and 1785). Act VIII of 1886 confirmed the hereditary seat of Prince Adam Kazimierz Czartoryski's descendants at the Upper House of the Diet of Hungary.	
Erba-Odescalchi		1910 (authorization to use the Italian title)	1831	Duke of Monteleone (Italian nobility): 1906.	
Esterházy				Hungarian baron: 1613; Hungarian count: 1620; imperial prince: 1687. The family's two other branches continued to bear the title of count. The Esterházys' hereditary seat at the Upper House of the Diet of Hungary was confirmed by Act VIII of 1886.	
Festetics		1910 (primogeniture)		Hungarian count: 1766, 1772 and 1874; imperial count: 1857. The family's three other branches continued to bear the title of count. The Festetics' hereditary seat at the Upper House of the Diet of Hungary was confirmed by Act VIII of 1886.	
Hercegović				Duke of Saint Sava: Herceg Vladislav Hercegović received two fortresses in Križevci County in Slavonia in 1467. The Republic of Ragusa paid a pension to his descendants who lived in the Principality of Transylvania until the early 17th century. The circumstances surrounding the adoption of the title are unknown, although most likely Stjepan Vukčić Kosača, Vladislav's father, took the title all by himself around 1449/50.	
Khevenhüller-Metsch			Article 73 of 1638, article 100 of 1649 and article 44 of 1764/65	Imperial baron: 1566; Austrian count: 1673; imperial count: 1725; Bohemian and imperial prince: 1763 (primogeniture). Act VIII of 1886 confirmed the hereditary seat of Prince Johann Joseph Khevenhüller-Metsch's descendants at the Upper House of the Diet of Hungary.	
Kinsky			Article 37 of 1687, article 124 of 1723 and article 68 of 1741	Imperial count: 1628 (confirmed in 1676 and 1687); Bohemian prince (primogeniture): 1746; imperial prince: 1747. Act VIII of 1886 confirmed the hereditary seat of Count Philip Joseph Kinsky's descendants at the Upper House of the Diet of Hungary.	
Koriatovych				Prince Fyodor Koriatovych received the domain of Munkács (now Mukachevo in Ukraine). His line extinguished in 1414.	
Liechtenstein			Article 27 of 1608, article 27 of 1687 and article 129 of 1715	Imperial prince: 1608. Act VIII of 1886 confirmed the hereditary seat of the descendants of Princes Karl, Maximilian, Hans-Adam, Maximilian, Anton-Philip, Hartmann, Anton Florian, Hans, Hartmann, Hans Venzel, Emanuel, Hans Anton Liechtenstein at the Upper House of the Diet of Hungary.	
Lobkowicz			Article 131 of 1659	Imperial baron: 1459; imperial prince: 1624. Act VIII of 1886 confirmed the hereditary seat of Prince Václav Lobkowicz's descendants at the Upper House of the Diet of Hungary.	
Lónyay (†)		1917		Hungarian baron: 1627; Hungarian count: 1871, 1896 and 1910. Elemér Lónyay, who was rewarded with the title of prince in 1917, died childless in 1946. The family's three other branches continued to bear the title of count and the family had two branches that did not bear an aristocratic title. The Lónyays' hereditary seat at the Upper House of the Diet of Hungary was confirmed by Act VIII of 1886.	
Metternich			Article 38 of 1827	Imperial baron: 1635; imperial count: 1679; imperial prince (primogeniture): 1803; Austrian baron: 1813. Act VIII of 1886 confirmed the hereditary seat of Prince Klemens von Metternich's descendants at the Upper House of the Diet of Hungary.	
Odescalchi		1697 (expansion of the imperial title)	Article 40 of 1751	Imperial prince: 1689 (confirmed in 1698). Livius Odescalchi's family name and title of prince were granted to his nephew, Marquess Balthasar Erba. Act VIII of 1886 confirmed the hereditary seat of Prince Livius Odescalchi's descendants at the Upper House of the Diet of Hungary.	
Paar			Article 119 of 1655	Imperial baron: 1623; imperial count: 1652 (confirmed in Bohemia: 1654); imperial prince (primogeniture): 1769. Act VIII of 1886 confirmed the hereditary seat of Count Franz Paar's descendants at the Upper House of the Diet of Hungary.	
Pálffy (†)				Baron: 1581; imperial count: 1599; Hungarian count: 1634; Austrian prince (primogeniture): 1807. The Festetics' hereditary seat at the Upper House of the Diet of Hungary was confirmed by Act VIII of 1886. The last member of the family who held the title of prince, László Pálffy, died in 1947.	
Pálffy–Daun (†)		1879 (expansion of the Austrian title)		Austrian count: 1853; prince of Teano: 1876. The last member of the family who held the title of prince, József Pálffy–Daun, died in 1963.	
Perényi				Imperial prince ("Prince of Siklós"): 1517 (confirmed in 1541). The family never used the title of prince publicly.	
Puszta			Article 41 of 1635	Imperial duke (Duke of Pest): 1603; imperial prince (Prince of Puszta): 1621	
Schwarzenberg			Article 131 of 1659	Imperial baron: 1492; imperial count: 1599; imperial prince (primogeniture): 1670; imperial prince (all descendants of Prince Joseph Schwarzenberg) Act VIII of 1886 confirmed the hereditary seat of Count Johann Schwarzenberg's descendants at the Upper House of the Diet of Hungary.	
Thurn und Taxis		1885 (acknowledgement of the princely title in Hungary)	Article 51 of 1840	Baron: 1608; imperial count: 1624; count in Spain and the Low Countries: 1681; imperial prince: 1695. Act VIII of 1886 confirmed the hereditary seat of Prince Egon von Thurn und Taxis's descendants at the Upper House of the Diet of Hungary.	
Trauttmansdorff			Article 66 of 1625, article 133 of 1715	Austrian baron: 1598; imperial count: 1623; Bohemian and imperial prince: 1805 (primogeniture). Act VIII of 1886 confirmed the hereditary seat of Count Maximilian Trauttmansdorff's descendants at the Upper House of the Diet of Hungary.	
Újlaki (†)		1472		Lawrence Újlaki was styled prince after his father, Nicholas, was made king of Bosnia. The family extinguished in 1524.	
Windisch-Graetz			Article 119 of 1655, article 40 of 1751	Imperial baron: 1551; imperial count: 1658; imperial prince: 1804 (primogeniture), 1822. Act VIII of 1886 confirmed the hereditary seat of the descendants of Count Franz Joseph Windisch-Graetz and Barons Adam and Gottlieb Windisch-Graetz at the Upper House of the Diet of Hungary.	

== Margrave ==
Name	Coat-of-arms	Year of grant of the Hungarian title	Naturalization in Hungary	Remarks	References
Csáky-Pallavicini de Körösszegh et Adorján		1876		Counts Zsigmond and Hippolyt Csáky received royal authorization to adopt the name and title of their adoptive (but biological) father, Marquess Roger Pallavicini, in 1876. Their previous (legal) father (Siegmund Csáky) was the ex-husband of their mother (Eulalia Vaj de Vaja). (Örgrof)	
Pallavicini				(Örgrof)	

== Counts ==
Name	Coat-of-arms	Year of grant of the Hungarian title	Naturalization in Hungary	Remarks	References
Abensberg-Traun			Article 155 of 1647	Imperial count: 1653. Act VIII of 1886 confirmed the hereditary seat of Baron Ernst Traun's descendants at the Upper House of the Diet of Hungary.	
Aichelburg			Article 51 of 1840	Imperial and Austrian baron: 1627; imperial count: 1787.	
Almásy		1771, 1815 and 1910		The Almásys' hereditary seat at the Upper House of the Diet of Hungary was confirmed by Act VIII of 1886.	
Althann			Article 35 of 1578	Austrian baron: 1574; Hungarian baron: 1578; imperial count: 1608. Act VIII of 1886 confirmed the hereditary seat of the descendants of Barons Christoph, Eustachius, Wolfgang and Wilhelm Althann at the Upper House of the Diet of Hungary.	
Ambrózy		1913		Hungarian baron: 1838, 1845. The Ambrózys' hereditary seat at the Upper House of the Diet of Hungary was confirmed by Act VIII of 1886. Count István Ambrózy was authorized to adopt the name Ambrózy-Migazzi in 1918.	
Andrássy		1766, 1779		Hungarian baron: 1676. The Andrássys' hereditary seat at the Upper House of the Diet of Hungary was confirmed by Act VIII of 1886.	
Apor (†)		1696		Hungarian baron: 1693 and 1712. An extinguished branch of the Apor family.	
Apponyi		1739, 1808		Hungarian baron: 1606, 1624 and 1718. The family line descending from József, Lajos, Rudolf and Lipót Apponyi, who were rewarded with the title of count in 1808, extinguished, but the other line survived. The Apponyis' hereditary seat at the Upper House of the Diet of Hungary was confirmed by Act VIII of 1886.	
Auersperg			Article 102 of 1649, article 34 of 1802.	Imperial baron: 1573; imperial count: 1630, 1673. A branch of the family received the title of imperial prince in 1653 and 1791. Act VIII of 1886 confirmed the hereditary seat of the descendants of Counts Herbart, Gaetan and Nicholas von Auersperg at the Upper House of the Diet of Hungary.	
Balassa (†)		1653, 1664			
Bánffy (of Alsólendva) (†)		1622			
Bánffy (of Losonc) (†)		1696 and 1880		The family was descended from the ancient Tomaj kindred. Hungarian baron: 1674; Austrian count: 1855. The Bánffys' hereditary seat at the Upper House of the Diet of Hungary was confirmed by Act VIII of 1886. The two family lines that bore the title of count died out in 1858 and 1950, but the branches with the title of baron still exist.	
Barkóczy (†)		1687		Hungarian baron: 1631 and 1722. The family line that bore the title of count extinguished in 1872, but a matrilineal descendant of the family, Count Endre Hadik adopted the name Hadik-Barkóczy in 1887. The branches of the family that bear the title of baron still exist.	
Beckers			Article 33 of 1802	Baron in Electoral Palatinate: 1742; imperial and Bavarian count: 1790. Act VIII of 1886 confirmed the hereditary seat of the descendants of Count Joseph Beckers at the Upper House of the Diet of Hungary	
Béldi		1770		The Béldis' hereditary seat at the Upper House of the Diet of Hungary was confirmed by Act VIII of 1886.	
Bellegarde			Article 15 of 1830	Savoyard count: 1682; Bohemian count: 1741. Act VIII of 1886 confirmed the hereditary seat of Count Heinrich von Bellegarde's descendants at the Upper House of the Diet of Hungary.	
Benyovszky		1778, 1791		Móric and Rudolf Benyovszky (from the untitled family line) were authorized to use the title of their adoptive father, Count Sándor Benyovszky, who was the last member of the comital line, in 1902. The Benyovszkys' hereditary seat at the Upper House of the Diet of Hungary was confirmed by Act VIII of 1886.	
Berchtold			Article 40 of 1751	Austrian, imperial and Bohemian baron: 1633; imperial count: 1673. Act VIII of 1886 confirmed the hereditary seat of the descendants of Counts Anton, Franc and Joseph Berchtold at the Upper House of the Diet of Hungary.	
Bercsényi		1689		Hungarian baron: 1639.	
Berényi (†)		1700, 1720		Hungarian baron: 1655. The Berényis' hereditary seat at the Upper House of the Diet of Hungary was confirmed by Act VIII of 1886. The last member of the family, Count János Berényi, died after 1945.	
Bethlen (of Iktár)		1623		The family was descended from the ancient Becsegergely kindred. (Their kinship with the Bethlen of Bethlen family cannot be proved.)	
Bethlen (of Bethlen)		1696, 1697		The Bethlens' hereditary seat at the Upper House of the Diet of Hungary was confirmed by Act VIII of 1886. (Their kinship with the Bethlen of Iktár family cannot be proved.)	
Bissingen-Nippenburg			Article 50 of 1827	Imperial baron: 1647; imperial count: 1746. Act VIII of 1886 confirmed the hereditary seat of Count Ferdinand Bissingen-Nippenburg's descendants at the Upper House of the Diet of Hungary.	
Blanckenstein			Article 21 of 1792	Austrian count: 1796. Act VIII of 1886 confirmed the hereditary seat of the descendants of Ernst, Heinrich and Ernst Blanckenstein at the Upper House of the Diet of Hungary.	
Bolza			Article 21 of 1792	Baron: 1790; count: 1808. Act VIII of 1886 confirmed the hereditary seat of Baron Peter Bolza's descendants at the Upper House of the Diet of Hungary.	
Bombelles		1880		Act VIII of 1886 confirmed the hereditary seat of the descendants of Counts Mark Heinrich and Karl Albert Bombelles at the Upper House of the Diet of Hungary.	
Brankovic		1688		Baron: 1683.	
Breunner-Enkewoirth			Article 28 of 1687, article 134 of 1715.	Baron: 1550; count: 1693. Act VIII of 1886 confirmed the hereditary seat of Count Maximilian Ludwig Breunner's descendants at the Upper House of the Diet of Hungary.	
Burián		1918		Hungarian baron: 1900.	
Buttler			Article 134 of 1715.	Count: 1681. Act VIII of 1886 confirmed the hereditary seat of Count Johan Ludwig Buttler's descendants at the Upper House of the Diet of Hungary.	

Name	Coat-of-arms	Year of grant of the Hungarian title	Naturalization in Hungary	Remarks	References
Cavriani			Article 131 of 1659	Baron: 1359 and 1452; imperial count: 1636. Act VIII of 1886 confirmed the hereditary seat of Count Friedrich Cavriani's descendants at the Upper House of the Diet of Hungary.	
Cebrián			Article 42 of 1827	Act VIII of 1886 confirmed the hereditary seat of Count Anton Cebrián's descendants at the Upper House of the Diet of Hungary.	
Chamare-Harbuval			Article 73 of 1790/91	Austrian baron: 1727; Austrian count: 1751. Act VIII of 1886 confirmed the hereditary seat of the descendants of Aloys, Johann and Hans Chamare-Harbuval at the Upper House of the Diet of Hungary.	
Chotek			Article 46 of 1764/65	Bohemian count: 1723; imperial count: 1745. Act VIII of 1886 confirmed the hereditary seat of the descendants of Counts Johan Karl and Johann Rudolf Chotek at the Upper House of the Diet of Hungary.	
Crouy-Chanel		1908 (Count Endre Crouy-Chanel was authorized to use his title in Hungary)			
Csáky		1560, 1638, 1655 (confirmed in 1778)		The Csákys' hereditary seat at the Upper House of the Diet of Hungary was confirmed by Act VIII of 1886.	
Csekonics		1864 (confirmed in 1874)		The Csekonics' hereditary seat at the Upper House of the Diet of Hungary was confirmed by Act VIII of 1886.	
Cziráky		1723		Hungarian baron: 1620. The Czirákys' hereditary seat at the Upper House of the Diet of Hungary was confirmed by Act VIII of 1886.	
Czobor		1652		Hungarian baron: 1588.	
Degenfeld-Schonburg		1810		Imperial baron: 1625; imperial count: 1716. Act VIII of 1886 confirmed the hereditary seat of Count Maximilian Degenfeld-Schonburg's descendants at the Upper House of the Diet of Hungary.	
Dessewffy		1754, 1775		Hungarian baron: 1666, 1756 and 1763. The Dessewffys' hereditary seat at the Upper House of the Diet of Hungary was confirmed by Act VIII of 1886.	
Dezasse		1812	Article 34 of 1802	The Dezasses' hereditary seat at the Upper House of the Diet of Hungary was confirmed by Act VIII of 1886.	
Dőry (†)		1766		Hungarian baron: 1741, 1759, 1816; Austrian baron: 1854. The family line that bore the title of count extinguished, but the branch bearing the title of baron still flourishes.	
Drašković		1635		Hungarian baron: 1567; imperial count: 1631. The Drašković's hereditary seat at the Upper House of the Diet of Hungary was confirmed by Act VIII of 1886.	
Drugeth (†)		1622			
Edelsheim-Gyulai (†)		1906		Hungarian baron: 1882. The childless Count Lipót Gyulai adopted his nephew, Baron Leopold Edelsheim, in 1866. The Edelsheim-Gyulais' hereditary seat at the Upper House of the Diet of Hungary was confirmed by Act VIII of 1886. The family died out in 1981.	
Eltz			Article 47 of 1764/65	Imperial count: 1733. Act VIII of 1886 confirmed the hereditary seat of Count Anselm Casimir Eltz-Kempenich's descendants at the Upper House of the Diet of Hungary.	
Erdődy		1565 (confirmed in 1580)		The Erdődys' hereditary seat at the Upper House of the Diet of Hungary was confirmed by Act VIII of 1886.	
Esterházy		1626, 1683, 1715		A branch of the family bore the title of prince. The Esterházys' hereditary seat at the Upper House of the Diet of Hungary was confirmed by Act VIII of 1886.	

Name	Coat-of-arms	Year of grant of the Hungarian title	Naturalization in Hungary	Remarks	References
Fekete de Galántha		1758		Degree on the estate: 1540. Split between Comital and Baronial branches. Austrian baron: 1859.	
Festetics		1766, 1772 and 1874		Hungarian count: 1766, 1772 and 1874; imperial count: 1857. The head of a line of the family bore the title of prince. The Festetics' hereditary seat at the Upper House of the Diet of Hungary was confirmed by Act VIII of 1886.	
Folliot de Creneville			Article 44 of 1827	Act VIII of 1886 confirmed the hereditary seat of Count Louis Charles Folliot de Crenneville's descendants at the Upper House of the Diet of Hungary.	
Forgách		1640, 1647, 1655 and 1676		The family was descended from the ancient Hont-Pázmány kindred. Hungarian baron: 1560. The Forgáchs' hereditary seat at the Upper House of the Diet of Hungary was confirmed by Act VIII of 1886.	
Gudenus			1703	Imperial baron: 1696 (confirmed in 1730); Austrian count: 1907.	
Győry (†)		1785		The family died out in 1882.	
Gyulai		1701		Hungarian baron: 1694. The title of Count Sámuel Gyulai was transferred to his adopted son, Adolf Gyulai-Javorzik, who died in 1939.	
Gyürky		1867 (confirmed in 1874)		The last member of the family, Count Aladár Gyürky, died in 1979.	
Hadik		1763		Imperial count: 1777. The Hadiks' hereditary seat at the Upper House of the Diet of Hungary was confirmed by Act VIII of 1886.	
Hadik-Barkóczy				The son of Count Béla Hadik and Countess Ilona Barkóczy, Endre, adopted the double name in 1887.	
Haller				Imperial baron: 1656, 1699, 1790; imperial count: 1713, 1753. The Hallers' hereditary seat at the Upper House of the Diet of Hungary was confirmed by Act VIII of 1886.	
Harrach			Article 77 of 1563	Austrian baron: 1550; imperial baron: 1552; imperial count: 1627. Act VIII of 1886 confirmed the hereditary seat of the descendants of Baron Leonhard Harrach and his two sons at the Upper House of the Diet of Hungary.	
Herberstein			Article 77 of 1609	Austrian baron: 1531; imperial baron: 1537; Austrian count: 1644; imperial count: 1710.	
Horváth-Toldy		1883		Transylvanian baron: 1845; Austrian count: 1857. Count Sámuel Tholdy adopted János Petrichevich-Horváth, who assumed the Horváth-Toldy name. János's son, Count Lajos Horváth-Toldy, who survived his sons, also adopted his relative, Rudolf Petrichevich-Horváth, who thus assumed the name. The Horváth-Toldys' hereditary seat at the Upper House of the Diet of Hungary was confirmed by Act VIII of 1886.	
Hoyos			Article 41 of 1827	Baron: 1547; imperial count: 1674. Act VIII of 1886 confirmed the hereditary seat of the descendants of Count Johann Ernst Hoyos at the Upper House of the Diet of Hungary.	
Hugonnai (†)		1810 (confirmed in 1822)		Zsigmond Horváth who was rewarded with the title of count in 1810 changed his name to Hugonnai a year later. The Hugonnais' hereditary seat at the Upper House of the Diet of Hungary was confirmed by Act VIII of 1886. Count Kálmán Hugonnai, the last male member of the family, died in 1946.	
Hunyadi (†)		1453 (perpetual ispán)		John Hunyadi was granted the Transylvanian Saxon district of Bistritz after he abdicated the office of governor of Hungary. His son, Matthias Corvinus, was elected king of Hungary.	
Hunyady de Kéthely		1792		Hungarian baron: 1753; imperial count: 1797. The Hunyadys' hereditary seat at the Upper House of the Diet of Hungary was confirmed by Act VIII of 1886.	
Huyn		1697	Article 49 of 1840		
Jankovich		1885		The Jankovichs' had a hereditary seat at the Upper House of the Diet of Hungary.	
Jankovich-Bésán		1916		József Jankovich married Matild Tallián, who was the elder daughter of Anna Bésán, assumed his mother-in-law's family name in 1888. Their grandsons were awarded with the title of count. The Jankovich-Bésáns had a hereditary seat at the Upper House of the Diet of Hungary.	

Name	Coat-of-arms	Year of grant of the Hungarian title	Naturalization in Hungary	Remarks	References
Kálnoky		1697		The Kálnokys' hereditary seat at the Upper House of the Diet of Hungary was confirmed by Act VIII of 1886.	
Karacsay (†)		1798		Hungarian baron: 1779. Count Sándor Karacsay, the last male member of the family, died in 1880.	
Karátsonyi		1874		Imperial count: 1858. The Karátsonyis' hereditary seat at the Upper House of the Diet of Hungary was confirmed by Act VIII of 1886.	
Károlyi		1712		Hungarian baron: 1609. The Károlyis' hereditary seat at the Upper House of the Diet of Hungary was confirmed by Act VIII of 1886.	
Keglević		1687 (confirmed in 1816)		Hungarian baron: 1646. The Keglevićs' hereditary seat at the Upper House of the Diet of Hungary was confirmed by Act VIII of 1886.	
Kemény (†)		1744, 1804, 1808		Hungarian baron: 1698, 1755. The family was descended from John Kemény, Prince of Transylvania. The three family lines that bore the title of count extinguished, but the branches with the title of baron still flourish.	
Kendeffy		1762, 1916		The first line that bore the title of count died out in 1834. The second line which had a hereditary seat at the Upper House of the Diet of Hungary still flourish.	
Khevenhüller-Metsch			Article 73 of 1638, article 100 of 1649, article 44 of 1764/65	Imperial baron: 1566; Austrian count: 1673; imperial count: 1725; Bohemian and imperial prince (primogeniture): 1763. Act VIII of 1886 confirmed the hereditary seat of the descendants of Counts Joseph, Sigismund Friedrich, Hans Joseph, Franz Anton and Johann Emanuel Khevenhüller-Metsch at the Upper House of the Diet of Hungary.	
Kinsky			Article 37 of 1687, article 124 of 1723 and article 68 of 1741	Imperial count: 1628 (confirmed in 1676 and 1687); Bohemian prince (primogeniture): 1746; imperial prince: 1747. The head of the family bore the title of prince. Act VIII of 1886 confirmed the hereditary seat of Count Philip Joseph Kinsky's descendants at the Upper House of the Diet of Hungary.	
Kórógyi (†)		1417		The Kórógyis adopted the imperial title Count of Castell citing kinship, which received royal approval. They were the first indigenous family in Hungary to hold a title of (hereditary) count. In 1434, they confirmed their mutual inheritance contract with the imperial counts. The family extinguished in 1472.	
Kornis		1712		Transylvanian baron: 1609; Hungarian baron: 1636.	
Kottulinsky			Article 73 of 1790/91	Bohemian count: 1706; Prussian count: 1748. Act VIII of 1886 confirmed the hereditary seat of Count Joseph Kottulinsky's descendants at the Upper House of the Diet of Hungary.	
Kubinyi		1636		In the final years of the Kingdom, the comital dignity passed to a sub-branch of the Demenyfalva line pursuant to the hereditary clause of the original diploma, which conferred the title upon heirs utriusque sexus: "ac per se haeredes posterosque tuos utriusque sexus universos … atque deinceps te tuosque haeredes liberos ac perpetuos comites."	
Kulmer			Article 73 of 1790/91	Imperial baron: 1654; Austrian count: 1860. The family also had a branch bearing the title of baron. Act VIII of 1886 confirmed the hereditary seat of Baron Johann Kulmer's descendants at the Upper House of the Diet of Hungary.	
Kuun		1762		The Kuuns' hereditary seat at the Upper House of the Diet of Hungary was confirmed by Act VIII of 1886.	
Lamberg			Article 47 of 1764/65, article 73 of 1790/91.	Imperial count: 1628 (confirmed in 1676 and 1687); Bohemian prince (primogeniture): 1746; imperial prince: 1747. The head of the family bore the title of prince. Act VIII of 1886 confirmed the hereditary seat of Count Philip Joseph Kinsky's descendants at the Upper House of the Diet of Hungary.	
Lazansky			Article 82 of 1681	Imperial baron: 1630; Bohemian count: 1637. Act VIII of 1886 confirmed the hereditary seat of Count Karl Lazansky's descendants at the Upper House of the Diet of Hungary.	
Lázár		1702, 1750 (Transylvania)		Transylvanian baron: 1729. The family branch that received the title of count in 1750 extinguished. The Lázárs' hereditary seat at the Upper House of the Diet of Hungary was confirmed by Act VIII of 1886.	
Leiningen-Westerburg			Article 19 of 1833, article 47 of 1836		
Lónyay		1871, 1896 and 1910		Hungarian baron: 1627; Hungarian prince: 1917. One family branch bore the title of prince and the family had two branches that did not bear an aristocratic title. The Lónyays' hereditary seat at the Upper House of the Diet of Hungary was confirmed by Act VIII of 1886.	
Mailáth		1785 (ad personam), 1794, 1885		The family branches that received the title of count in 1785 and 1795 extinguished. The Mailáths' hereditary seat at the Upper House of the Diet of Hungary was confirmed by Act VIII of 1886.	
Migazzi			Article 46 of 1764/65	Count: 1698. Act VIII of 1886 confirmed the hereditary seat of Count Kaspar Migazzi's descendants at the Upper House of the Diet of Hungary.	
Mikes		1696 (Transylvania)		Transylvanian baron: 1693. The Mikes' hereditary seat at the Upper House of the Diet of Hungary was confirmed by Act VIII of 1886.	
Mittrowsky			Article 72 of 1790/91	Bohemian baron: 1716; Bohemian count: 1769. Act VIII of 1886 confirmed the hereditary seat of Count Karl Mittrowsky's descendants at the Upper House of the Diet of Hungary.	
Montecuccoli			Article 119 of 1655, article 134 of 1715	Imperial count: 1530. The family branch that was nationalized in Hungary in 1655 extinguished.	
Nádasdy		1625		Baron: 1553; Austrian count: 1828. The Nádasdys' hereditary seat at the Upper House of the Diet of Hungary was confirmed by Act VIII of 1886.	
Nákó		1813		The Nákós' hereditary seat at the Upper House of the Diet of Hungary was confirmed by Act VIII of 1886.	
Nemes		1755 (Transylvania)		The Nemes' hereditary seat at the Upper House of the Diet of Hungary was confirmed by Act VIII of 1886.	
Nesselrode			Article 46 of 1729	Imperial count: 1705. Act VIII of 1886 confirmed the hereditary seat of Count Johann Nesselrode's descendants at the Upper House of the Diet of Hungary.	
Niczky		1765		The Niczkys' hereditary seat at the Upper House of the Diet of Hungary was confirmed by Act VIII of 1886.	
Normann-Ehrenfels		1896		Count in the Kingdom of Würtemberg: 1806. When Counts Gusztáv and Rudolf Norman-Ehrenfels were rewarded with the title of count in 1896, they also received a hereditary seat at the Upper House of the Diet of Hungary.	
Nugent			Article 41 of 1827	Act VIII of 1886 confirmed the hereditary seat of Count Laval Nugent's descendants at the Upper House of the Diet of Hungary.	
Nyáry (of Bedeg and Berencs)		1632, 1655 and 1723		Baron: 1535, 1573. The Nyárys' hereditary seat at the Upper House of the Diet of Hungary was confirmed by Act VIII of 1886.	
Nyáry-Normann		1922 (by adoption)		Count Gusztáv Normann-Ehrenfels adopted Counts Ferenc and Sándor Nyáry (who were the sons of his wife by her first marriage) in 1922.	
Orssich		1682		Baron: 1675. The Orssichs' hereditary seat at the Upper House of the Diet of Hungary was confirmed by Act VIII of 1886.	
Pongracz		1743, 1763			

Name	Coat-of-arms	Year of grant of the Hungarian title	Naturalization in Hungary	Remarks	References
Szapáry		1722		Baron: 1690. The Szapárys' hereditary seat at the Upper House of the Diet of Hungary was confirmed by Act VIII of 1886.	
Széchenyi		1697		The Széchényis' hereditary seat at the Upper House of the Diet of Hungary was confirmed by Act VIII of 1886.	
Szécsen		1798		The Szécsens' hereditary seat at the Upper House of the Diet of Hungary was confirmed by Act VIII of 1886.	
Széchy		1645		The family was descended from the ancient Balog kindred. Imperial baron: 1516.	
Szirmay		1707		Baron: 1695. The family descended from Tamás Dessewffy of Csernek and Tarnakő, who was adopted by István Szirmay of Szirmabessenyő in 1690. The Szirmays' hereditary seat at the Upper House of the Diet of Hungary was confirmed by Act VIII of 1886.	
Szilágyi		1458 (perpetual ispán)		Notable family members: Michael Szilágyi, Regent of Hungary, Banate of Macsó; Erzsébet Szilágyi, Queen Mother of Hungary, mother of king Matthias Corvinus	
Szőgyény–Marich		1910		The grant of the title of count included the Szőgyény–Marich's hereditary seat at the Upper House of the Diet of Hungary.	
Sztáray		1747		Baron: 1725. The Sztárays' hereditary seat at the Upper House of the Diet of Hungary was confirmed by Act VIII of 1886.	
Szunyogh (†)		1669		Baron: 1588 and 1604.	
Takács–Tolvay		1905		József and István Takács of Kisjóka were granted the right to adopt the name and the comital title of the Tolvay family.	
Taxis			Article 42 of 1827.	Austrian baron: 1714; Austrian count: 1839.	
Teleki		1685		Imperial count: 1697 (confirmed in 1767). The Telekis' hereditary seat at the Upper House of the Diet of Hungary was confirmed by Act VIII of 1886.	
Tholdalagi		1744		The Tholdalagis' hereditary seat at the Upper House of the Diet of Hungary was confirmed by Act VIII of 1886.	
Thököly (†)		1654		Baron: 1593.	
Thoroczkay		1757		Baron: 1733. Another branch of the family bore the title of baron. The Tholdalagis' hereditary seat at the Upper House of the Diet of Hungary was confirmed by Act VIII of 1886.	
Thurzó (†)		1606		Imperial baron: 1550.	
Tisza		1883 (expanded in 1897)		The Tiszas' hereditary seat at the Upper House of the Diet of Hungary was confirmed by Act VIII of 1886 and in 1897.	
Tolvay		1754		Baron: 1709.	
Török		1774		The Töröks' hereditary seat at the Upper House of the Diet of Hungary was confirmed by Act VIII of 1886.	
Üchtritz–Amadé		1903		Baron Emil Üchtritz adopted the family name of his mother, Countess Dominika Amadé.	
Vay		1830		Baron: 1783, 1799. Two family branches bore the title of baron. The Vays' hereditary seat at the Upper House of the Diet of Hungary was confirmed by Act VIII of 1886.	
Vécsey (†)		1813		Baron: 1692. The family branch that bore the title of count extinguished in 1879, but the baronial branches survived.	
Vigyázó (†)		1895		The Vigyázós received a hereditary seat at the Upper House of the Diet of Hungary.	
Voikffy		1763		Baron: 1730. The Voikffys' hereditary seat at the Upper House of the Diet of Hungary was confirmed by Act VIII of 1886.	
Waldstein			Article 93 of 1635.	Austrian count: 1619; imperial count: 1628. Act VIII of 1886 confirmed the hereditary seat of Count Adam Waldstein's descendants at the Upper House of the Diet of Hungary.	
Wallis			Article 28 of 1687.	Imperial count: 1724; Bohemian count: 1736.	
Walterskirchen			Article 34 of 1802.	Austrian baron: 1643; Austrian count: 1907.	
Wartensleben			Article 73 of 1790/91.	Imperial baron: 1703; count in Prussia: 1703; imperial count: 1706. Act VIII of 1886 confirmed the hereditary seat of Count Wilhelm Wartensleben's descendants at the Upper House of the Diet of Hungary.	
Wenckheim			Article 73 of 1790/91.	Austrian baron: 1776; Austrian count: 1802. The Wenckheims' hereditary seat at the Upper House of the Diet of Hungary was confirmed by Act VIII of 1886.	
Wesselényi (†)		1646		Baron: 1582 (confirmed in 1725). The family branches that bore the title of baron survived.	
Wilczek		1709	Article 134 of 1715.	Baron: 1506; imperial count: 1713; Bohemian count: 1729. Act VIII of 1886 confirmed the hereditary seat of Count Heinrich Wilczek's descendants at the Upper House of the Diet of Hungary.	
Wimpffen		1902	Article 42 of 1827.	Imperial count: 1797; baron in Würtemberg: 1834; Austrian baron: 1876. The Wimpffens received a hereditary seat at the Upper House of the Diet of Hungary in 1902.	
Woracziczky		1914		Bohemian count: 1783. The Woracziczkys received a hereditary seat at the Upper House of the Diet of Hungary in 1914.	
Wurmbrand-Stuppach		1682	Article 82 of 1681.	Imperial baron: 1607; imperial count: 1701.	
Zápolya (†)		1465 (perpetual ispán)		John Zápolya was elected king of Hungary in 1526.	
Zay		1830		Baron: 1560. The Zays' hereditary seat at the Upper House of the Diet of Hungary was confirmed by Act VIII of 1886.	
Zedtwitz		1891		Imperial and Bavarian count: 1790; Austrian count: 1846.	
Zelenski (†)		1899		Count in Galicia: 1801. The Zelenskis received a hereditary seat at the Upper House of Hungary in 1899. The last member of the family, Count Róbert Zelenski, died in 1939.	
Zichy		1679		Baron: 1655. The Zichys' hereditary seat at the Upper House of the Diet of Hungary was confirmed by Act VIII of 1886.	

== Barons ==
Name	Coat-of-arms	Year of grant of the Hungarian title	Naturalization in Hungary	Remarks	References
Mesko de Felső Kubinyi		1721			
Alaghy		1607			
Monoki (†)		1625			
Oláh		1558			

== Sources ==
- Fügedi, Erik (1986). Ispánok, bárók, kiskirályok [Ispáns, Barons and Petty Kings]. Magvető. ISBN 963-14-0582-6.
- Gudenus, János József (1990). A magyarországi főnemesség XX. századi genealógiája, I. kötet: A–J [Genealogy of the Hungarian Titled Nobility in the 20th Century, Volume I: A–J]. Natura. ISBN 963-234-313-1.
- Gudenus, János József (1993). A magyarországi főnemesség XX. századi genealógiája, II. kötet: K–O [Genealogy of the Hungarian Titled Nobility in the 20th Century, Volume II: K–O]. Tellér Kft. ISBN 963-8178-00-0.
- Gudenus, János József (1998a). A magyarországi főnemesség XX. századi genealógiája, III. kötet: P–S [Genealogy of the Hungarian Titled Nobility in the 20th Century, Volume III: P–S]. Heraldika Kiadó. ISBN 963-233-304-7.
- Gudenus, János József (1998b). A magyarországi főnemesség XX. századi genealógiája, IV. kötet: Sz–Zs [Genealogy of the Hungarian Titled Nobility in the 20th Century, Volume IV: Sz–Zs]. Heraldika Kiadó. ISBN 963-85853-8-2.
- Kristó, Gyula (2003). Early Transylvania (895–1324). Lucidus Kiadó. ISBN 963-9465-12-7.
- Lerski, Jerzy Jan (1996). Historical Dictionary of Poland, 966–1945. Greenwood Publishing Group. ISBN 0-313-26007-9.
- Neumann, Tibor (2014). "Találkozó Konstanzban: A Kórógyiak grófi címe [Meeting in Konstanz: The Title of the Kórógyi Counts]". Turul (in Hungarian). 87 (3). Magyar Heraldikai és Genealógiai Társaság: 104–108. ISSN 1216-7258.
- Neumann, Tibor (2016). "Hercegek a középkorvégi Magyarországon [Dukes in Hungary in the Late Middle Ages]". In Zsoldos, Attila (ed.). Hercegek és hercegségek a középkori Magyarországon [Dukes and Duchies in Medieval Hungary] (in Hungarian). Városi Levéltár és Kutatóintézet. pp. 95–112. ISBN 978-963-8406-13-2.
- Pálffy, Géza (2009). The Kingdom of Hungary and the Habsburg Monarchy in the Sixteenth Century. Center for Hungarian Studies and Publications. ISBN 978-0-88033-633-8.
- Pálosfalvy, Tamás (2016). "A szentszávai hercegek Magyarországon [The Dukes of Saint Sava in Medieval Hungary]". In Zsoldos, Attila (ed.). Hercegek és hercegségek a középkori Magyarországon [Dukes and Duchies in Medieval Hungary] (in Hungarian). Városi Levéltár és Kutatóintézet. pp. 113–127. ISBN 978-963-8406-13-2.
- Péter, Katalin; Benda, Borbála; Horn, Ildikó; Koltai, András (2008), A magyar arisztokrácia családi kapcsolatrendszere a 16–17. században [Family Connections of the Hungarian Aristocracy in the 16th-17th Centuries] (in Hungarian), archivum.piar.hu/arisztokrata/
- Štih, Peter (2010). The Middle Ages between the Eastern Alps and the Northern Adriatic: Select Papers on Slovene Historiography and Medieval History. BRILL. ISBN 978-90-04-18591-3.
