= Jan Jesenský Jr. =

Czech scientist

Jan Jesenský Jr. ((5 March 1904 – 24 October 1942) was a Czech scientist and a member of the Resistance during World War II.

Jesenský was born in Prague to Milada and František Jesenský. He was a cousin of the writer Milena Jesenská.

In 1922 he enrolled at the Faculty of Medicine of Charles University; after his graduation he published several monographs, mainly in the area of dentistry.

In 1927 he married Dr. Alžběta Guttmannová.

He worked with his uncle Professor Jan Jesenský at Prague Stomatologic Clinic, assistant professor at Prague University.

After the occupation of Czechoslovakia by Hitler, he became a member of a secret military resistance organisation. In 1942 he was arrested by the Gestapo; his wife Alžběta, brother Jiří and sister-in-law Žofia were also arrested and taken to the Mauthausen concentration camp, Austria where all four of them died on October 24, 1942.

In 1946 he was awarded the Czechoslovak Medal of Honour War Cross.

A plaque in the centre of Prague commemorates Alžběta and Jan Jesenská.

== See also ==
- House of Jeszenszky
