= Janko Jesenský =

Czechoslovak poet, lawyer, politician and translator

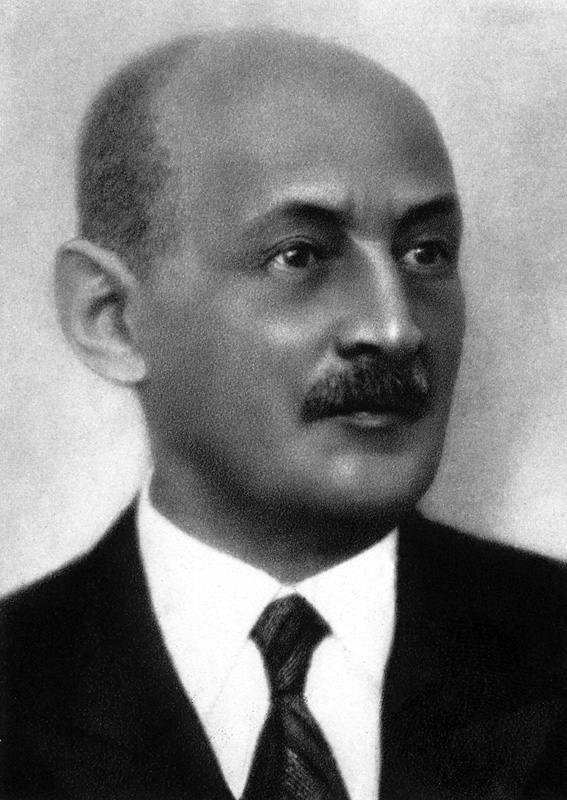
Janko Jesenský in 1937

Baron Ján Jesenský (30 December 1874 in Tučiansky Svätý Martin (Hungarian: Túrócszentmárton), Kingdom of Hungary (present day Martin, Slovakia) – 27 December 1945 in Bratislava, Czechoslovakia) was a Slovak lower nobleman of the House of Jeszenszky, poet, prose writer, translator, and politician. He was a prominent member of the Slovak national movement.
