= Jaromír Krejcar =

Czech functionalistic architect

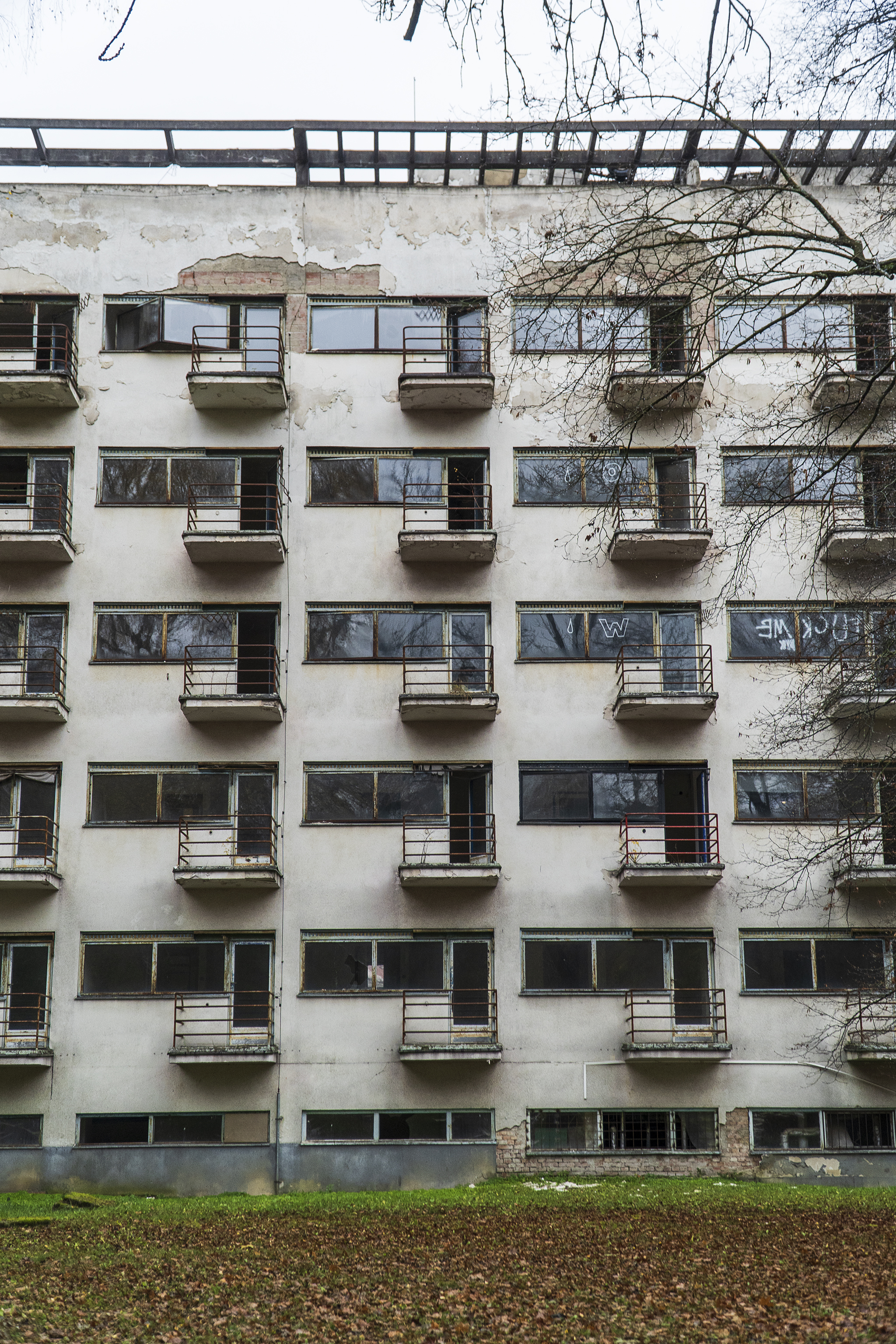
Sanatorium Machnáč in Trenčianske Teplice, one of Krejcar's best known works, with visible strong influence of Bauhaus

Jaromír Krejcar (25 July 1895 - 5 October 1950) was a Czech functionalistic architect, student of Jan Kotěra and member of Devětsil.

== Career ==
He was born in Hundsheim, Austria. He collaborated with Czech structural engineer, Dr. Jaroslav Josef Polivka on the internationally acclaimed Czech Pavilion at the Paris Exposition of 1937.

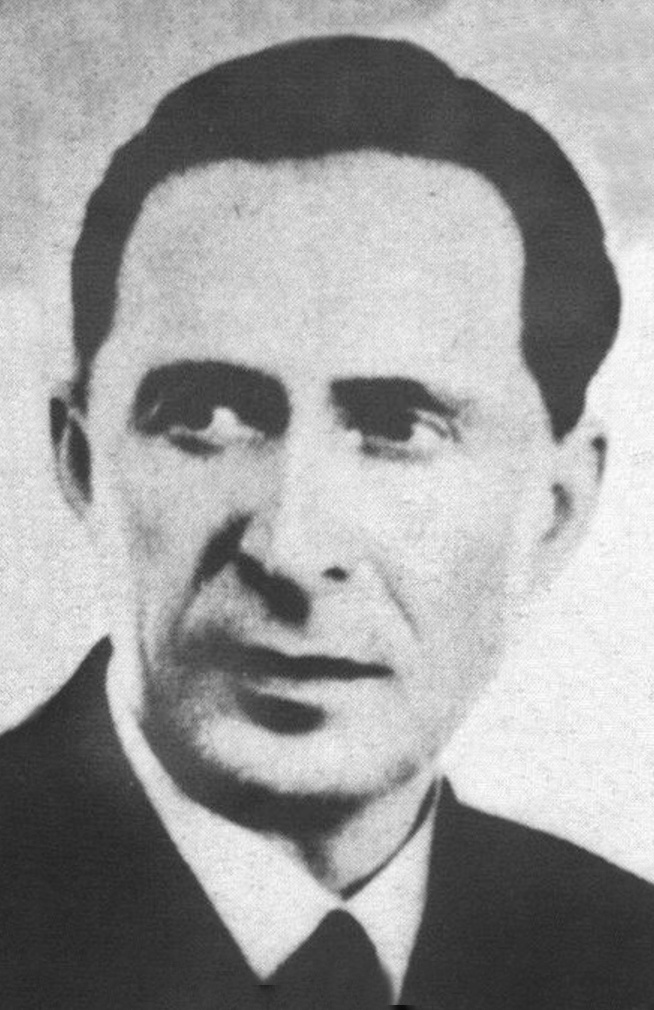
Portrait of Jaromir Krejcar

Krejcar was husband of journalist Milena Jesenská and father of Jana Krejcarová. After the Communist-organized 1948 Czechoslovak coup d'état he went to exile to the United Kingdom. He died in London.
