= Přítomnost =

Czech political-cultural magazine

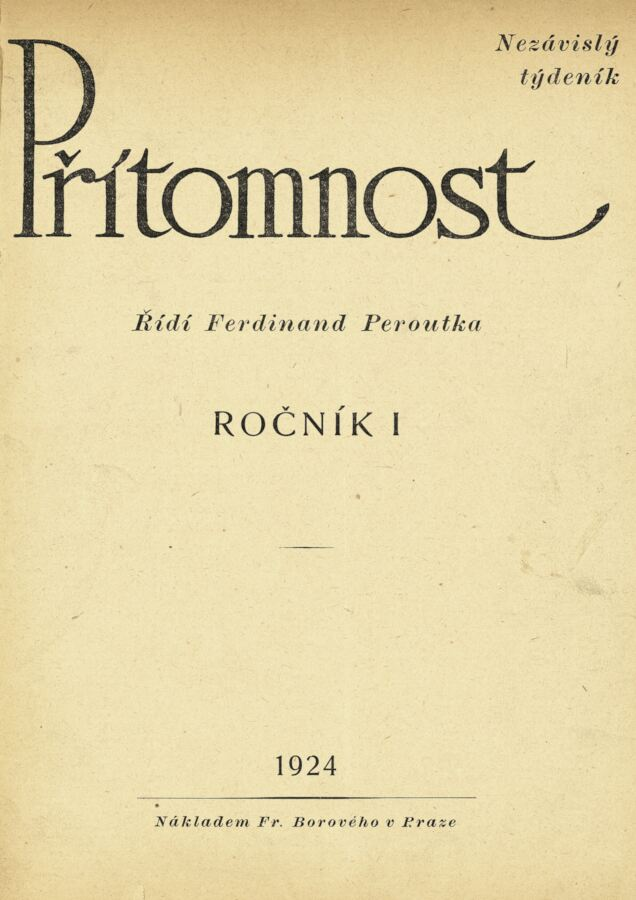
The title page of the magazine in 1924

Přítomnost (lit. "Presence") is a Czech political-cultural magazine published in Prague.

== History ==
Přítomnost was started in 1924. It was able to come into existence thanks to T. G. Masaryk (first Czechoslovakia's President), who at the time was financially supporting young journalist Ferdinand Peroutka. The magazine gained a notable reputation and became one of the most respected political publication of its time. A large number of democratically minded authors such as Karel Čapek, Milena Jesenská, Eduard Bass, Karel Poláček, Richard Wiener, Václav Černý, Otokar Fischer contributed to Přítomnost. Politician and publisher Jaroslav Stránský was the magazine's publisher.

The magazine gave voice to conflicting opinions on what to do with refugees during the late 1930s, with some arguing that they must be welcomed and integrated while others argued that they would serve a pretext for another German invasion and were doomed regardless. Jesenská in particular brought attention to the plight of Jewish refugees. After the Nazi occupation of Czechoslovakia, Peroutka was deported to a concentration camp in Buchenwald. After the War, Přítomnost was restarted as Dnešek, but in February 1948 it ended. A number of young Czech intellectuals in exile tried to publish the magazine in its former incarnation and named it Skutečnost. Amongst the contributors to this magazine were Pavel Tigrid, Jaroslav Stránský, Meda Mládková and Ferdinand Peroutka.

=== Relaunch ===
In January 1995, Martin Jan Stránský, the grandson of Jaroslav Stránský, carried on the family tradition and began to publish Nová Přítomnost. The first editor in chief of the renewed magazine was the poet Miroslav Holub. He was followed in this role by Petr Pithart, Jan Sokol, Tomáš Vrba, and Libuše Koubská. The current editors of the magazine are Ivan Malý and Martin Riegl. In January 2000, Nová Přítomnost went back to the original name of Přítomnost established by Peroutka. The magazine has published articles by some of the leading academics, writers, and journalists of the Czech Republic, including former Czech President Václav Havel. In 1996, Stransky also started publishing an English-language version of the magazine under the title of The New Presence.
