= Hungária (band) =

Hungarian band

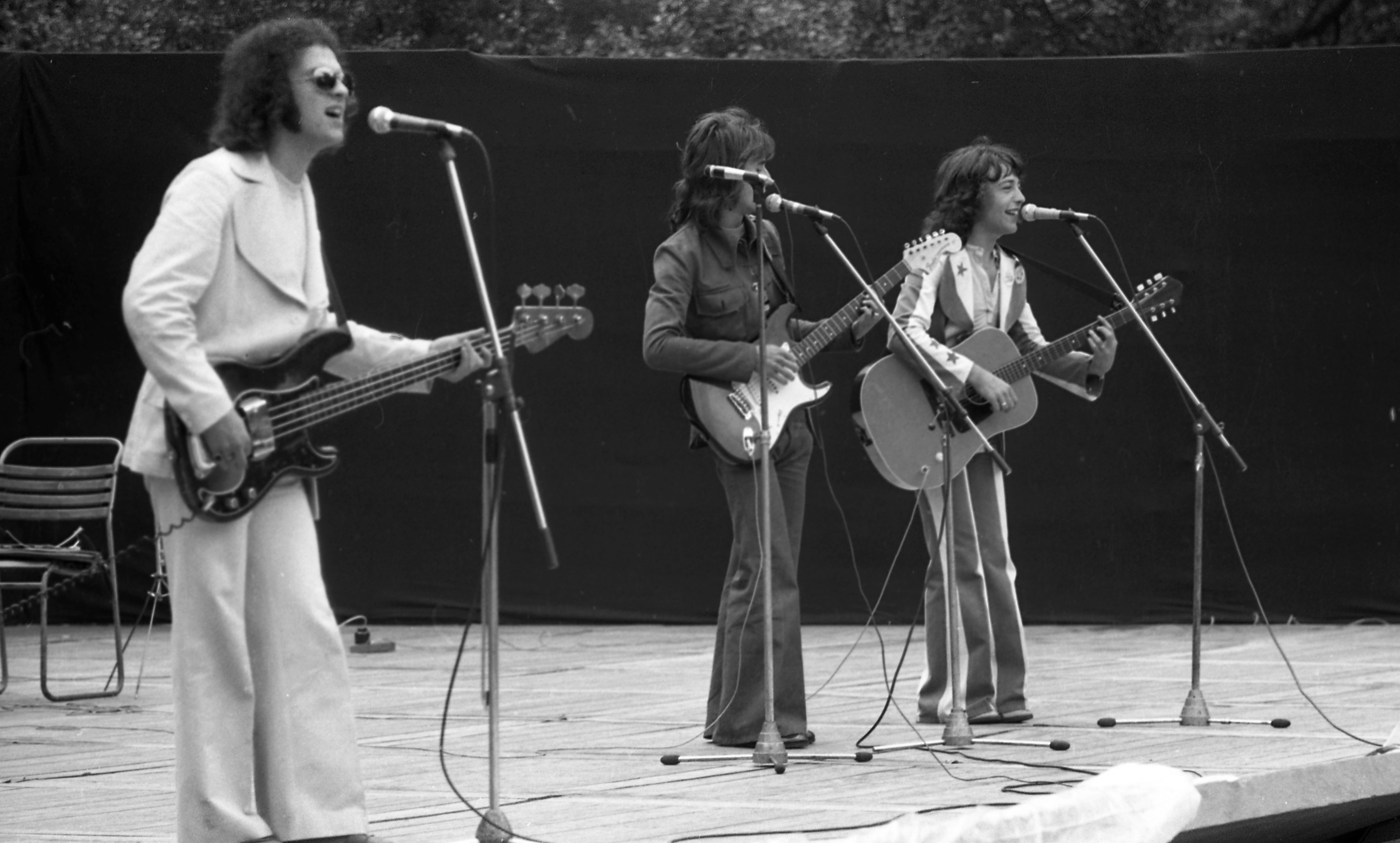
- Hungária performing live in 1973, with band leader Miklós Fenyő at right

Background information
- Origin: Budapest, Hungary
- Genres: Rock; pop; beat
- Years active: 1967–1983; 1985–1986; 1995
- Labels: MHV; Hungaroton
- Spinoffs: Locomotiv GT; Skorpió; Modern Hungária; Dolly Roll
- Past members: Miklós Fenyő; Péter Csomós; Miklós Matlaszkovszky; László Klein; Péter Láng; József Tóth; Péter Sipos; Tamás Barta; József Tóth; Zoltán Kékes; Gábor Szucs Antal; Gyula Fekete; Gábor Fekete; Róbert Szikora; Mária "Dolly" Penczi; Flipper Öcsi; Zsoldos Deddy

Hungária were a Hungarian pop-rock band formed by singer-guitarist-keyboardist Miklós Fenyő in 1967. Despite periodic suppression by the Hungarian Communist regime, by the early 1980s Hungária was one of the country's most popular bands.

== History ==
Miklós Fenyő had lived in the United States for a time. He entered the Hungarian music scene in 1962 and started his own band Syconor in 1964. In 1967 he formed a songwriting partnership with lyricist István S. Nagy, and formed Hungária as an outlet for his songs. The earliest Hungária songs were in the style of beat music. In 1968 the band won the televised talent competition Ki mit tud?. In the following years, the band moved toward psychedelic rock and hard rock. Their first album Koncert a marson (Concert on Mars) was released in 1970. The band then experienced many lineup changes, with Fenyő as the only consistent member.

Due to pressure from Hungary's Communist regime, which considered rock music to be subversive, Hungária faced many difficulties in the mid-1970s. They were unable to sell records or perform live in their own country. For several years they were only able to perform live in East Germany, and later they were able to make a living by touring other countries in the Soviet bloc. They recorded a Beatles covers album titled Beatles Laz, which was released in other countries in 1978 but was outlawed in Hungary until 1997.

In 1979 the band decided to adopt the style of early rock n' roll revivals, with English lyrics and tours of Western Europe. Their 1980 album in this style, Rock ’n’ Roll Party, was a major hit in Hungary, and the band adopted 1950s American rock n' roll fashions for all public appearances, as did many of their fans. The 1981 album Hotel Menthol was another substantial hit. In 1982 the band played to 80,000 people at Népstadion in Budapest.

Some members of the band resisted the focus on 1950s music and imagery, as Fenyő tried to enforce a fashion code even for the members' personal lives. This caused the band to split in 1983. Several compilations and live albums were released in the following years. After the breakup, Fenyő released a successful solo album titled Miki and briefly led a new band called Modern Hungária. Other members went on to form the band Dolly Roll. Several notable members of the original Hungária reunited in 1995 for the album Ébredj fel Rockandrollia (Awaken Rock n' Roll). A musical based on the band's music, titled Hotel Menthol, debuted in 1998 and was performed more than 200 times.

Miklós Fenyő died from complications of pneumonia on 31 January 2026, at the age of 78.

== Discography ==
- Koncert a marson (1970)
- Hungária (1971)
- Beatles Laz (1978)
- Rock ’n’ Roll Party (1980)
- Hotel Menthol (1981)
- Arena (1983)
- Finale? (1983)
- Reg volt, igy volt (1985)
- Van aki forrón szereti (1985)
- Szív, zene, szerelem (1986)
- Csók x csók (1987)
- Egyszer fenn, egyszer lenn (1988)
- Hungária aranyalbum (1990)
- Hungária válogatás (1994)
- Ébredj fel Rockandrollia (1995)
- Micsoda buli (1995)

== Members ==
- Miklós Fenyő (g, voc, keyboards), 1967–1995; died 2026
- Péter Csomós (g), 1967–1971
- Miklós Matlaszkovszky (g, voc), 1967–1969
- László Klein (bass), 1967–1969, 1971
- Péter Láng (sax), 1967–1969
- József Tóth (dr), 1967–1969
- Péter Sipos (voc, bass), 1969–1980
- Tamás Barta (g), 1969–1971, 1972
- József Tóth (dr), 1969–1971
- Zoltán Kékes (g, voc), 1972–1995
- Gábor Szucs Antal (g), 1971
- Gyula Fekete (sax, voc), 1972–1995
- Gábor Fekete (dr), 1971
- Róbert Szikora (dr, voc), 1972–1982
- Mária "Dolly" Penczi (voc), 1980–1995
- Flipper Öcsi (voc), 1980–1995
- Zsoldos Deddy (dr), 1982–1995
