= Dolly Roll =

Hungarian pop band

Dolly Roll was a Hungarian pop band established in 1983 from former members of the band Hungária. Their first LP, Vakáció-ó-ó sold 250,000 copies within two months. In 1984, they went on a tour in Hungary, performing in 50 places. They released a new album every year. In both 1986-1987 and 1992 the band went through some changes in membership. In 1998, they held a concert in Budapest Sportcsarnok. In 2017, their lead singer, Maria "Dolly" Penczi, announced that the band would stop performing. Throughout their first thirty years, they sold more than five million records.

== Members ==
1983–1987	Mária "Dolly" Penczi – vocals; Béla Tibor Jeszenszky – vocals, rhythm guitar; Gábor Novai – bass guitar, vocals; Zoltán Kékes – guitar, vocals; Gyula Fekete – saxophone, vocals; Gábor Zsoldos – percussion
1987–1990	Mária Penczi – vocals; Gábor Novai – bass guitar, synthesizer, vocals; Zoltán Kékes – guitar, vocals; Gyula Fekete – saxophone, vocals; Gábor Kecskés – percussion, vocals
1990–1992	Mária Penczi – vocals; Gábor Novai – bass guitar, synthesizer, vocals; Zoltán Kékes – guitar, vocals; Gábor Kecskés – percussion, vocals
1992–	Mária Penczi – vocals; Zoltán Kékes – guitar, vocals; Gábor Kecskés – percussion, vocals

== Discography ==
- Vakáció-ó-ó (1983)
- Eldoradoll (1984)
- Happy cocktail (1985)
- Oh-la-la (1986)
- Játék az élet (1987)
- Zakatol a szív (1988)
- Országúti randevú (1988) (compilation)
- Dupla vagy semmi (1989)
- Ábrándos szép napok (1989)
- Ébreszd fel a szívemet (1990)
- Rég volt, szép volt (1990)
- Gondolsz-e majd rám (1991)
- Rock & Roll-ra Hívlak! (1992)
- Beat turmix '60 1 (1993)
- Tipi-Tapi Dinó (1993)
- Simogass napsugár (1993) (compilation)
- Beat turmix '60 2 (1994)
- Tipi-Tapi Party (1994)
- Dolly Roll Gold (1995) (compilation)
- Atlanta Rá-rá-rá, hajrá!!! (1996)
- Tipi-Tapi Csodaországban (1997)
- Dolly Roll ReMix '98 (1998) (compilation)
- Vakáció-ó-ó '98 (1998) (live album)
- Poperett (1999)
- Dolly Jubileumi Koncert (2003) (live album)
- Plussz... (2005)
- Karácsony (2009)
- Emlékszel még - Best Of (2009) (compilation)
