= Dessewffy =

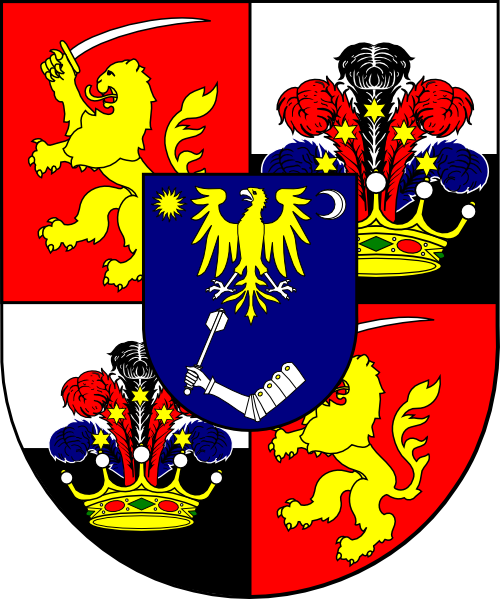
Coat of arms of Dessewffy family

Dessewffy is the name of an important Hungarian noble family which originated from Slavonia, whose members held the title of Count in the Kingdom of Hungary, granted to them on 17 March 1775.

== Notable members ==
- Arisztid Dessewffy
- Aurél Dessewffy
- Aurél Dessewffy (1846–1928)
- Emil Dessewffy

== See also ==
- List of titled noble families in the Kingdom of Hungary
