= Alena Wagnerová =

Czech author and journalist (b. 1936)

Alena Wagnerová (born 18 May 1936) is a Czech author and journalist writing in both Czech and German.

She was born in Brno and studied biology at Masaryk University. Wagnerová went on to study teaching, theatre, German and comparative literature. She taught at the Dům pionýrů in Brno, then was head of the Veterinary Faculty laboratory at the Agricultural University and later was a playwright at the Divadlo Julia Fučíka. From 1968 to 1969, she was editor of Studentské listy. She went to Germany in 1969 and was married there. Wagnerová also worked on the Paměť žen (Women's Memories) project in Prague.

She has written about German authors from Prague such as Franz Kafka and Milena Jesenská and Bohemian cultural figures such as Sidonie Nádherná von Borutín. In both her fiction and non-fiction, she explores issues such as the status of women and Czech-German relations.

== Selected works ==
- Milena Jesenská, biography (1996), Czech
- Die Familie Kafka aus Prag, biography (1997), German also translated into French as La famille Kafka de Prague (2004)
- Milena Jesenská: Biographie, biography (1997), German also translated into Italian as Milena Jesenská: Una biografia (2004)
- Das Leben der Sidonie Nádherný, biography (2003), German
- Helden der Hoffnung : die anderen Deutschen aus den Sudeten, 1935-1989, history (2008), German
- Sidonie Nádherná, biography (2013), Czech
- Bol lásky prodejné (2013), Czech
