= Jana Černá =

Czech writer and poet (1928–1981)

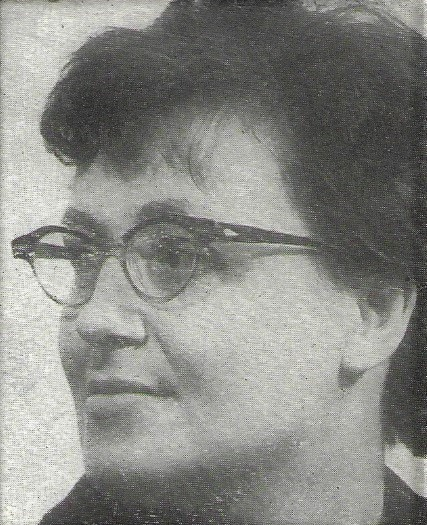
- Jana Černá in 1964
- Born: Jana Krejcarová; 14 August 1928; Prague, Czechoslovakia
- Died: 5 January 1981 (aged 52); Prague, Czechoslovakia
- Other names: Honza Krejcarová; Sarah Silberstein
- Occupations: Writer, Poet
- Spouses: Pavel Gabriel; Miloš Černý; Ladislav Lipanský; Daniel Landman
- Partner: Egon Bondy
- Parent(s): Jaromír Krejcar (father); Milena Jesenská (mother)
- Relatives: Jan Jesenský (grandfather)

Jana Černá (14 August 1928 – 5 January 1981), born Jana Krejcarová, called "Honza", was a Czech poet, writer, and editor of samizdat editions in Czechoslovakia. She was a daughter of the journalist Milena Jesenská (1896-1944) and architect Jaromír Krejcar (1895-1950). After the communist coup d'état of 1948 she started publishing with her friends Egon Bondy, Ivo Vodseďálek and others in a secret underground edition Půlnoc. She was married 4 times and had 5 children. Černá died at the age of 52 in a car accident.

== Work ==
- Hrdinství je povinné (1964)
- Nebyly to moje děti... (1966)
- Adresát Milena Jesenská (1969)
- V zahrádce otce mého (1988)
- Clarissa a jiné texty (1990)
