= Indigenat (disambiguation) =

Indigénat was a set of laws creating, in practice, an inferior legal status for natives of French Colonies.

Indigenat or indigenate, literally meaning "the right by the place of birth", may refer to:

- Ius indigenatus
- Indygenat
- Indigenat (Hungary)
