= Indigenat (Hungary) =

In the history of Hungary indigenat was conferring the rights of citizenship and nobility upon foreign nationals.

John Paget (1850) footnoted:

Although the king can make any Hungarian peasant noble, he cannot confer on a foreigner, not even on an Austrian subject, the rights of Hungarian nobility; this power, both in Hungary and Transylvania, the Diet reserves to itself. The Indigenat tax -- in Hungary two thousand, and in Transylvania one thousand ducats -- is often remitted as a compliment to the person on whom the right of citizenship is conferred.

== See also ==
- Indigenat (disambiguation), similar concepts in other places
