= Diet of Hungary =

Parliament of the Kingdom of Hungary

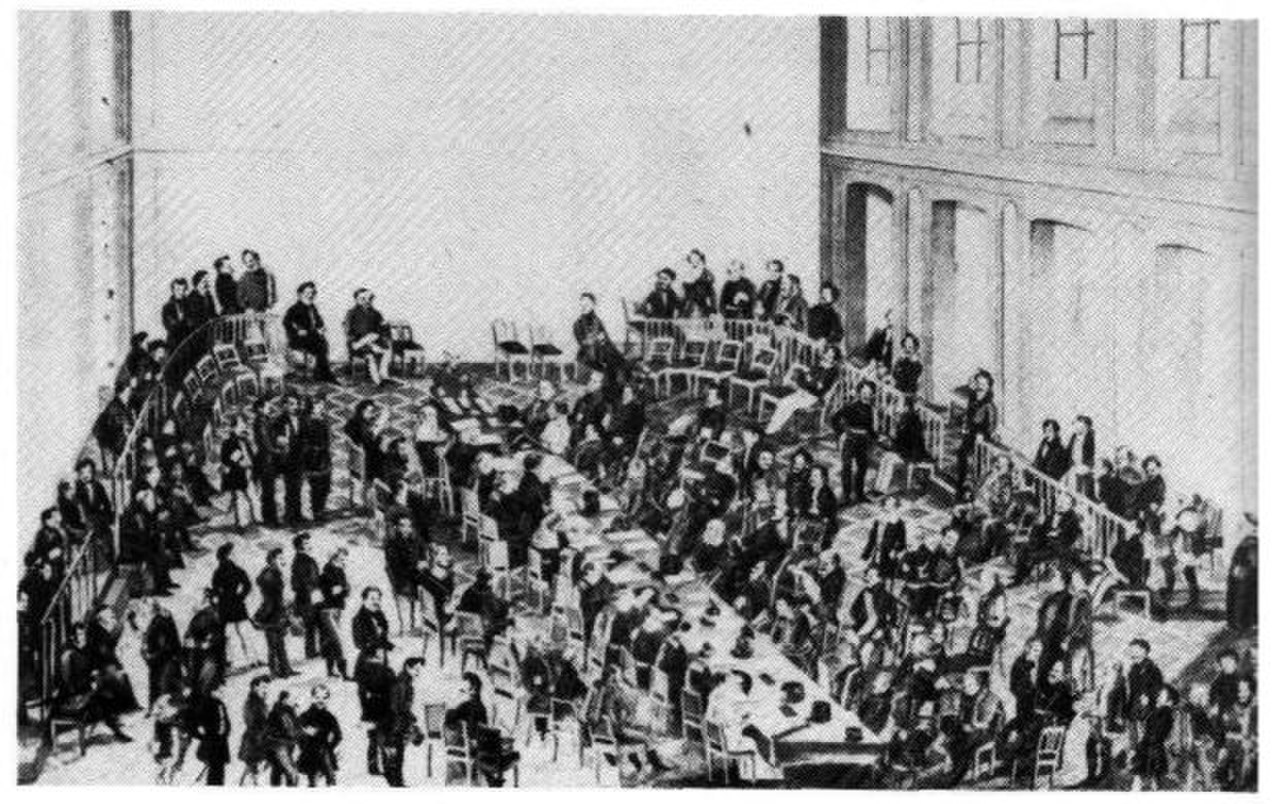
Diet of Hungary of 1830

The Diet of Hungary or originally: Parlamentum Publicum / Parlamentum Generale (Hungarian: Országgyűlés) was the most important political assembly in Hungary since the 11th century, which emerged to the position of the supreme legislative institution in the Kingdom of Hungary from the 1290s, and in its successor states, Royal Hungary and the Habsburg kingdom of Hungary throughout the early modern period until the end of World War II. The name of the legislative body was originally "Parlamentum" during the Middle Ages, the "Diet" expression gained mostly in the early modern period. It convened at regular intervals with interruptions from the 12th century to 1918, and again until 1946.

The articles of the 1790 diet set out that the diet should meet at least once every 3 years, but since the diet was called by the Habsburg monarchy, this promise was not kept on several occasions thereafter. As a result of the Austro-Hungarian Compromise, it was reconstituted in 1867.

The Latin term Natio Hungarica ("Hungarian nation") was used to designate the elite which had participation in the medieval and early modern era political life of Hungary (at local level as members of the assemblies of the counties, or nation-wide level as members of the Parliaments). The members of the parliament consisted of the envoys of the Roman Catholic clergy, the elected envoys of the nobility from the county assemblies of the Kingdom, and the envoys of cities who were elected by the people of the Royal Free Cities regardless of mother tongue or ethnicity of the person. Natio Hungarica was a geographic, institutional and juridico-political category.

== Official Designations ==
=== Medieval era ===
Throughout the Middle Ages, the most frequently employed Latin designation for internal use was Congregatio Generalis, (English: “general assembly.”) From the late 12th century until the early 16th century, Congregatio Generalis remained the predominant term appearing exclusively in Latin-language documents intended for domestic official purposes, serving as the recognized designation of the Hungarian estates’ assemblies.

Although extremely rare for domestic purposes, the terms Parlamentum Publicum and Parlamentum Generale were in use from the very outset. However, the usage of Parlamentum was dominant name and almost exclusively confined to diplomatic correspondence or communications intended for foreign audiences, in order to provide a more readily comprehensible terminology familiar to Western Europe.

=== Early modern period ===
The early modern era designation, Diéta, which came into prominence from the Jagellonian period onward, is likewise of Latin origin—classically, diaeta signified “daily regimen, assembly, or mode of life.” However, the term Dieta entered the Hungarian legal lexicon through German influence and mediation, deriving from the practices of the Holy Roman Empire, where it appeared as the "Reichstag Diät".

The Latin-language German imperial documents frequently employed the term dietas imperiales (“imperial assemblies”), while in German-language sources the compound "Reichstag Diät" was commonly used. Variants included Kurfürstliche Diät—assemblies of the German prince-electors or regional estates —and Stände- or Landdiät— provincial or local German assemblies, attended, for example, by the German nobility and towns of a given territory.

Thus, in Jagellonian Hungary, the Dieta did not assume official status as a direct continuation of its classical Latin origin, but rather as a Latin term adapted from the legacy of German imperial model.

Concurrently, during the Jagellonian period, the Hungarian-language term országgyűlés (“national assembly”) began to appear and gradually spread in early Hungarian correspondence and documentary sources alongside the Latin-German origin Dieta.

== Development ==
Some researchers have traced the roots of the Hungarian institution of national assemblies as far back as the 11th century. This based on documentary evidence that, on certain "important occasions" under the reigns of King Ladislaus I and King Coloman "the Learned", assemblies were held on a national scale where both ecclesiastic and secular dignitaries made appearances. The first exact written mention of the word "parlamentum" (parliament) for the nationwide assembly originated during the reign of King Andrew II in the Golden Bull of 1222, which reaffirmed the rights of the smaller nobles of the old and new classes of royal servants (servientes regis) against both the crown and the magnates, and to defend the rights of the whole nation against the crown by restricting the powers of the latter in certain fields and legalizing refusal to obey its unlawful/unconstitutional commands (the "ius resistendi"). The lesser nobles also began to present Andrew with grievances, a practice that evolved into the institution of the Hungarian Diet.

An institutionalized Hungarian parliament emerged during the 14th and 15th centuries. Beginning under King Charles I and continuing under subsequent kings through into the reign of King Matthias I, the Diet was primarily convened by the king. However, under the rule of autocratic kings like Louis the Great and the early absolutist Matthias Corvinus, parliaments were often summoned merely to formalize royal decisions, which members were obliged to approve to meet constitutional requirements, thus it had no significant power of its own. However, since the reign of the Jagiellonian dynasty, the parliament has regained most of its traditional power.

In 1492, the Diet limited all serfs' freedom of movement and greatly expanded their obligations while at the same time only a few peasant families were prospering because of increased cattle exports to the West. Rural discontent boiled over in 1514 when well-armed peasants preparing for a crusade against Turks rose up under György Dózsa. Shocked by the peasant revolt, the Diet of 1514 passed laws that condemned the serfs to eternal bondage and increased their work obligations further.

When King Vladislaus II died in 1516, a royal council appointed by the Diet ruled the country in the name of his ten-year-old son, King Louis II (1516–26).

In 1608 the Diet divided into two houses: House of Magnates and House of Representatives. From next Diet in 1609, the members of the House of Representatives elected by nobles of the Counties, by civics of the free royal cities and by members of the cathedral chapters.

== Diet of the Estates ==
Until 1848, the Diets were called Hungarian Diet of the Estates (Hungarian: Rendi országgyűlés) which was an Estates General.

From the 13th century onwards, law-making was a joint right of the king and the diet. This remained a fundamental principle of the constitution of the later society of estate. After the extinction of the House of Árpád, the king was in many cases elected by the Diet, which guaranteed the Szabad Királyválasztás Joga (right of electing the king).

Before the development of the society of estate, the Diet consisted of the lords and the leaders of the church, but then the voting base was extended to the common nobility and the elected representatives of Royal free cities. By the 16th century the social classes that made up the 4 estates were the nobility, the common nobility, the clergy and the burghers.

From the 1400s onwards, two chambers began to be steadily separated, the lower plate of the estates and the arch-noblety on the upper. With the parliamentary system, the upper chamber was given over to the high priests and arch-nobles, while the lower chamber was filled by elected representatives. The Era of Reforms in 1848 brought an end to the Diet of the Estates, introducing the National Assembly. One of the key words of the Revolution of '48 was the taking away the privileges of the nobles and oligarchs, so currently there is an unicameral system, to guarantee the rule of the people. Until 1848, cathedral chapters were also members of the lower house, with 1-2 envoys.

== List of legislative sessions ==
=== Early legislative assemblies, 11th century ===
Start date	End date	Location	Details
1057	1057	Székesfehérvár	The first known nationwide legislative assembly
1060	1060	Székesfehérvár	
1061	1061	Székesfehérvár	
1064	1064	Székesfehérvár	
1074	1074	Székesfehérvár	

=== Early legislative assemblies 12th century ===
Start date	End date	Location	Details
1131	1131	Arad	
1174	1174	Székesfehérvár	

=== Parliamentary sessions of Kingdom of Hungary, 13th century ===
Start date	End date	Location	Details
1222	1222	Székesfehérvár	The first assembly which was called as "Parlamentum"
1231	1231	Székesfehérvár	
1245	1245	Székesfehérvár	
1267	1267	Székesfehérvár	
1272	1272	Székesfehérvár	
1277	1277 May	First phase at Rákos	
1277	1277 August	Second phase at Székesfehérvár	
1289	1289	Székesfehérvár	
1291	1291	Székesfehérvár	
1299	1299	Székesfehérvár	

=== Parliamentary sessions of Kingdom of Hungary, 14th century ===
Start date	End date	Location	Details
1305	1305	Székesfehérvár	
1307	1307	Rákos	
1308	1308	Buda	
1310	1310	Székesfehérvár	
1320	1320	Székesfehérvár	
1342	1342	Székesfehérvár	
1351	1351	Buda	
1382	1382	Székesfehérvár	
1384	1384	Buda	
1385	1385	Pest	
1385	1385	Székesfehérvár	
1386	1386	Székesfehérvár	
1387	1387	Székesfehérvár	
1397	1397	Temesvár	

=== Parliamentary sessions of Kingdom of Hungary, 15th century ===
Start date	End date	Location	Details
1435	1435	Latin: Posonium (Hungarian: Pozsony, German: Pressburg, now Bratislava)	
1438	1439	Székesfehérvár	
1440	1440	Székesfehérvár	
1445	1445	Székesfehérvár	
1459	1459	Szeged	
1463	1463	Tolna	
1464	1464	Székesfehérvár	
1467	1467	Buda	
1492	1492	Buda	

=== Parliamentary sessions of Kingdom of Hungary, 16th century ===
Start date	End date	Location	Details
1505	1505	Rákos	
1506	1506	Székesfehérvár	
1510	1510	Tata	
1510	1510	Székesfehérvár	
1525	1526	Székesfehérvár	

=== Diets of Royal Hungary – 1527–1699 (the most important diets) ===
Start date	End date	Location	Details
1527	1528	Buda	
1532	1532	Buda	
1536	1536	Várad	
1537	1537	Pressburg (Pozsony, now Bratislava)	
1542	1543	Besztercebánya (now Banská Bystrica)	
1545	1545	Nagyszombat (now Trnava)	
1547	1547	Nagyszombat	
1548	1548	Pozsony (German: Pressburg, now Bratislava)	
1550	1550	Pressburg	
1552	1552	Pressburg	
1553	1553	Sopron	
1554	1554	Pressburg	
1555	1555	Pressburg	
1556	1556	Pressburg	
1557	1557	Pressburg	
1559	1559	Pressburg	
1563	1563	Pressburg	
1566	1566	Pressburg	
1567	1567	Pressburg	
1569	1569	Pressburg	
1572	1572	Pressburg	
1574	1574	Pressburg	
1575	1575	Pressburg	
1578	1578	Pressburg	
1581	1581	Pressburg	
1583	1583	Pressburg	
1587	1587	Pressburg	
1593	1593	Pressburg	
1596	1596	Pressburg	
1597	1597	Pressburg	
1598	1598	Pressburg	
1599	1599	Pressburg	
1600	1600	Pressburg	
1601	1601	Pressburg	
1602	1602	Pressburg	
1603	1603	Pressburg	
1604	1604	Pressburg	
1608	1608	Pressburg	
1609	1609	Pressburg	
1613	1613	Pressburg	
1618	1618	Pressburg	
1622	1622	Sopron	
1625	1625	Sopron	
1630	1630	Pressburg	
1635	1635	Sopron	
1637	1638	Pressburg	
1647	1647	Pressburg	
1649	1649	Pressburg	
1655	1655	Pressburg	
1659	1659	Pressburg	
1662	1662	Pressburg	
1681	1681	Sopron	
1687	1687	Pressburg	

=== Diets during the Habsburg ruled Kingdom of Hungary (1700–1867) ===
Start date	End date	Location	Details
1708	1715	Pressburg	Continuously interrupted
1722	1723	Pressburg	
1728	1729	Pressburg	
1741	1742	Pressburg	
1751	1751	Pressburg	
1764	1765	Pressburg	
1790	1791	Pressburg	First phase not held in Pressburg
1792	1792		
1796	1796		In 1796, the diet was convened again to be informed that "attacked by the impious and iniquitous French nation, the king felt the necessity of consulting his faithful states of Hungary, remembering that, under Maria Theresa, Hungary had saved the monarchy." The diet voted to supply a contingent of 50,000 men, and undertook to provision the Austrian army, amounting to 340,000 soldiers. The diet was dissolved after only nineteen sittings.
1802	1802		The diet of 1802 discussed demands on Hungary with regard to the French Revolutionary Wars.
1805	1805		The diet of 1805 resembled that of 1802.
1807	1807		The diet of 1807 was more remarkable. To the usual demands was added the royal proposition that an army should be raised, and ready to march at the first signal.
1811	1812		
1825	1827	Pressburg	
1830		Pressburg	Crowned Archduke Ferdinand as King of Hungary
1832	1836		
1839	1840		
1843	1844		
1847	1847/8		

== Re-establishment in 1867 ==
In the course of the Hungarian Revolution of 1848 a diet was called at Pest that was dismissed by decree of Emperor Ferdinand I of Austria in October; the next year a Hungarian assembly met at the Protestant Great Church of Debrecen, which declared the new Emperor Franz Joseph deposed and elected Lajos Kossuth regent-president. The revolution was finally suppressed by Austrian troops under General Julius Jacob von Haynau and the assembly dissolved.

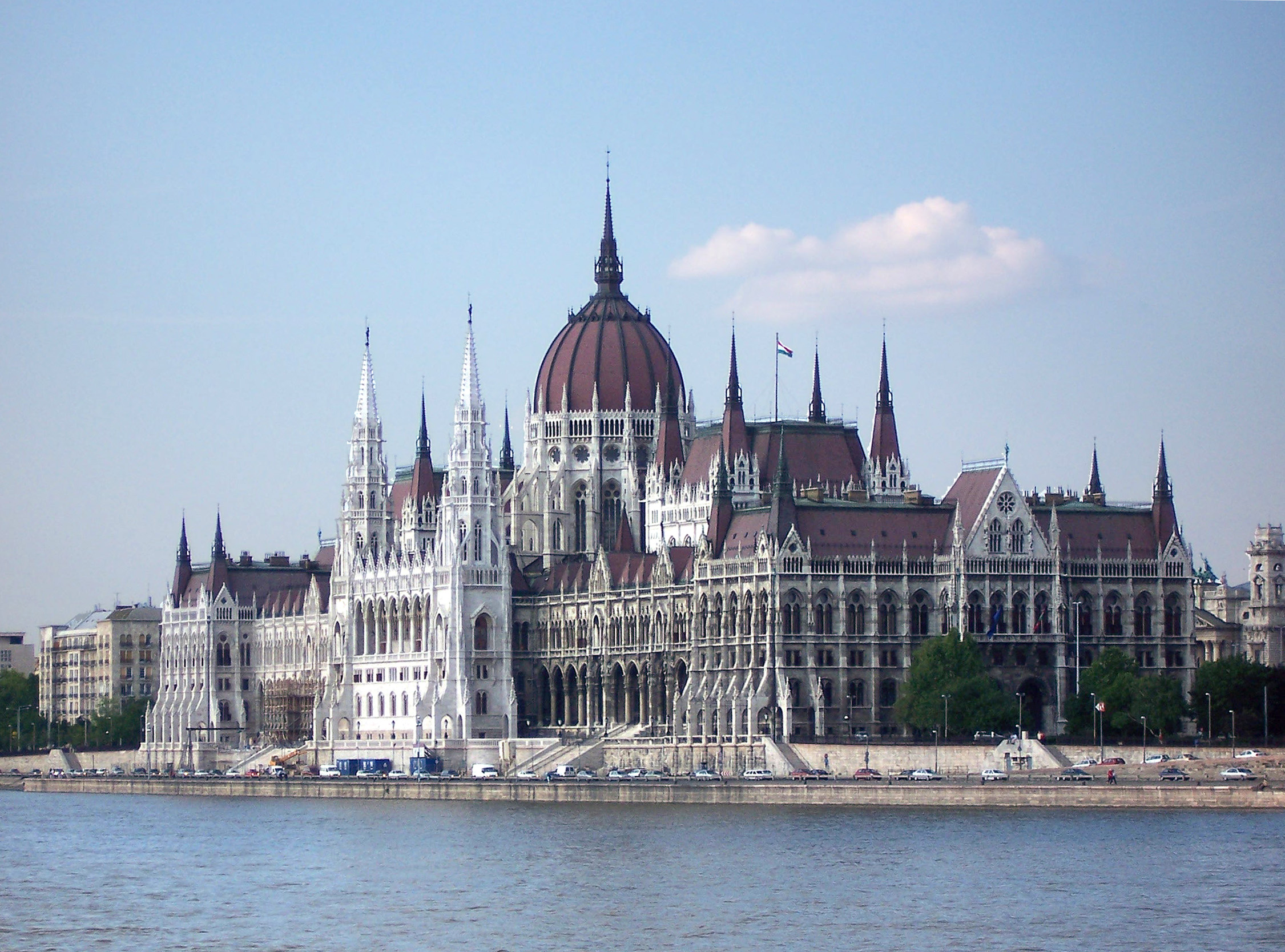
Since 1902 the diet has been assembling in the Hungarian Parliament Building in Budapest.

The Habsburgs again approached the Hungarian estates after the disastrous defeat at the 1859 Battle of Solferino and the loss of Lombardy. In 1860 Emperor Franz Joseph issued the October Diploma, which provided a national Reichsrat assembly formed by delegates deputed by the Landtage diets of the Austrian crown lands, followed by the February Patent of 1861, promising the implementation of a bicameral legislature. The Hungarian magnates however rejected being governed from Vienna and insisted on a parliamentary assembly with comprehensive autonomy in Hungarian affairs. The negotiations failed, predominantly due to the tough stance of Austrian Minister-President Anton von Schmerling.

Finally in the course of the Austro-Hungarian Compromise of 1867, the emperor appointed Gyula Andrássy Hungarian minister-president and the re-established national assembly convened on 27 February.

The legislative power was vested in this parliament, consisting of two houses: an upper house titled the Főrendiház ([føːrɛndihaːz], House of Magnates), and a lower house titled the Képviselőház ([ˈkeːpviʃɛløːhaːz], House of Representatives). From 1902 on parliament assembled in the Hungarian Parliament Building on the Danube in Budapest.

=== House of Magnates ===
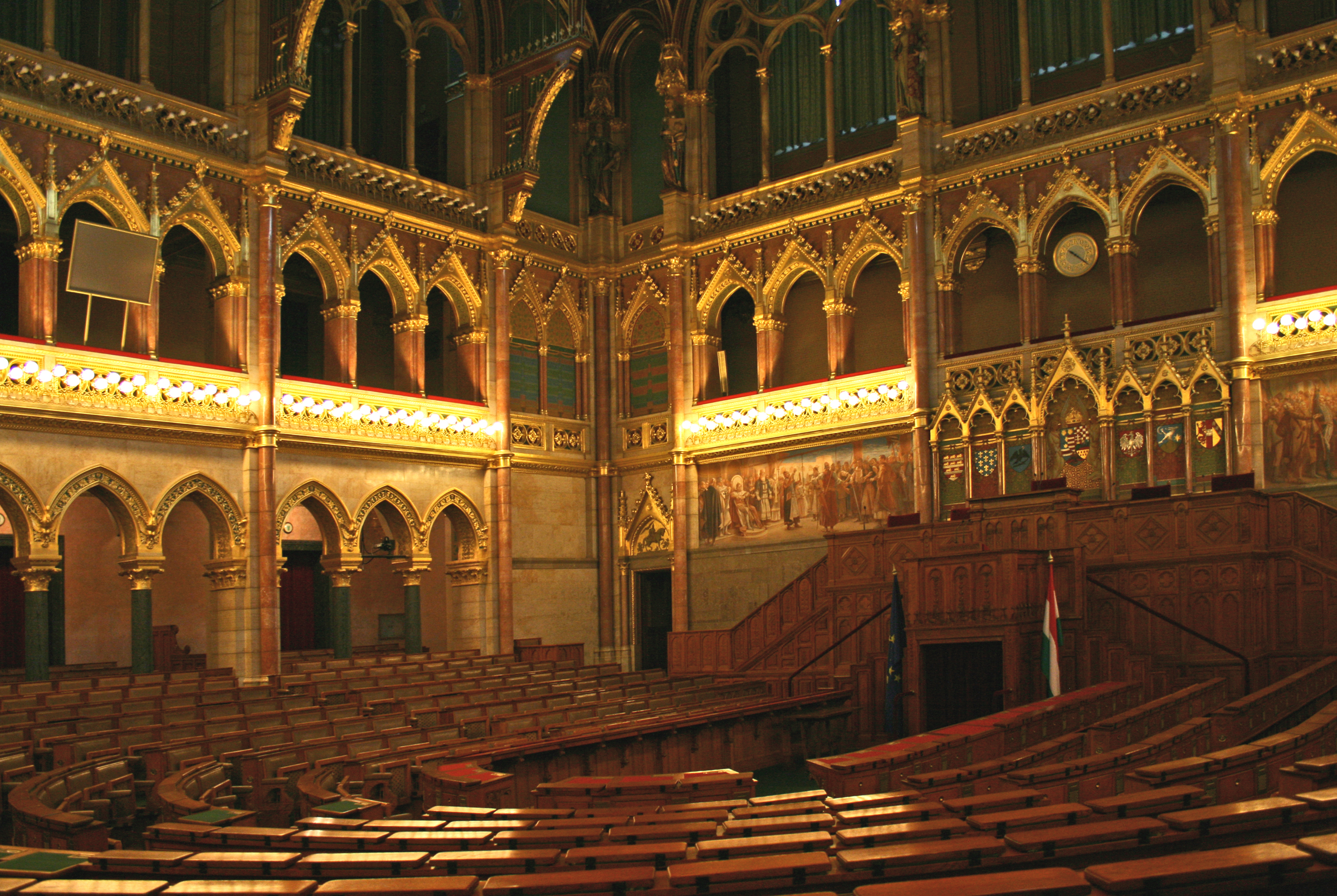
Assembly hall of the House of Magnates

The House of Magnates (Főrendiház) was, like the current British House of Lords, composed of hereditaries, ecclesiastics, and, unlike the House of Lords, deputized representatives from autonomous regions (similar to Resident Commissioners of United States territories). The House had no fixed membership size, as anyone who met the qualifications could sit in it. The official list:

- Princes of the royal house who have attained their majority (16 in 1904)
- Hereditary peers who paid at least 3000 florins a year land tax (237 in 1904) (at its 1896 exchange rate, £1 was worth 12 florins, so this comes to £250)
- High dignitaries of the Catholic and Eastern Orthodox churches (42 in 1904)
- Representatives of the Protestant confessions (13 in 1904)
- Life peers appointed by the Crown, not exceeding 50 in number, and life peers elected by the house itself (73 altogether in 1904)
- Various state dignitaries and high judges (19 in 1904)
- Three delegates of Croatia-Slavonia

See also List of speakers of the House of Magnates

=== House of Representatives ===
Since the beginning until the 1848 revolution in Hungary, the members of the house of representatives were elected noble envoys from the members of the counties of the kingdom of Hungary, the elected envoys of the free royal cities of the kingdom, and the envoys of the lower clergy.

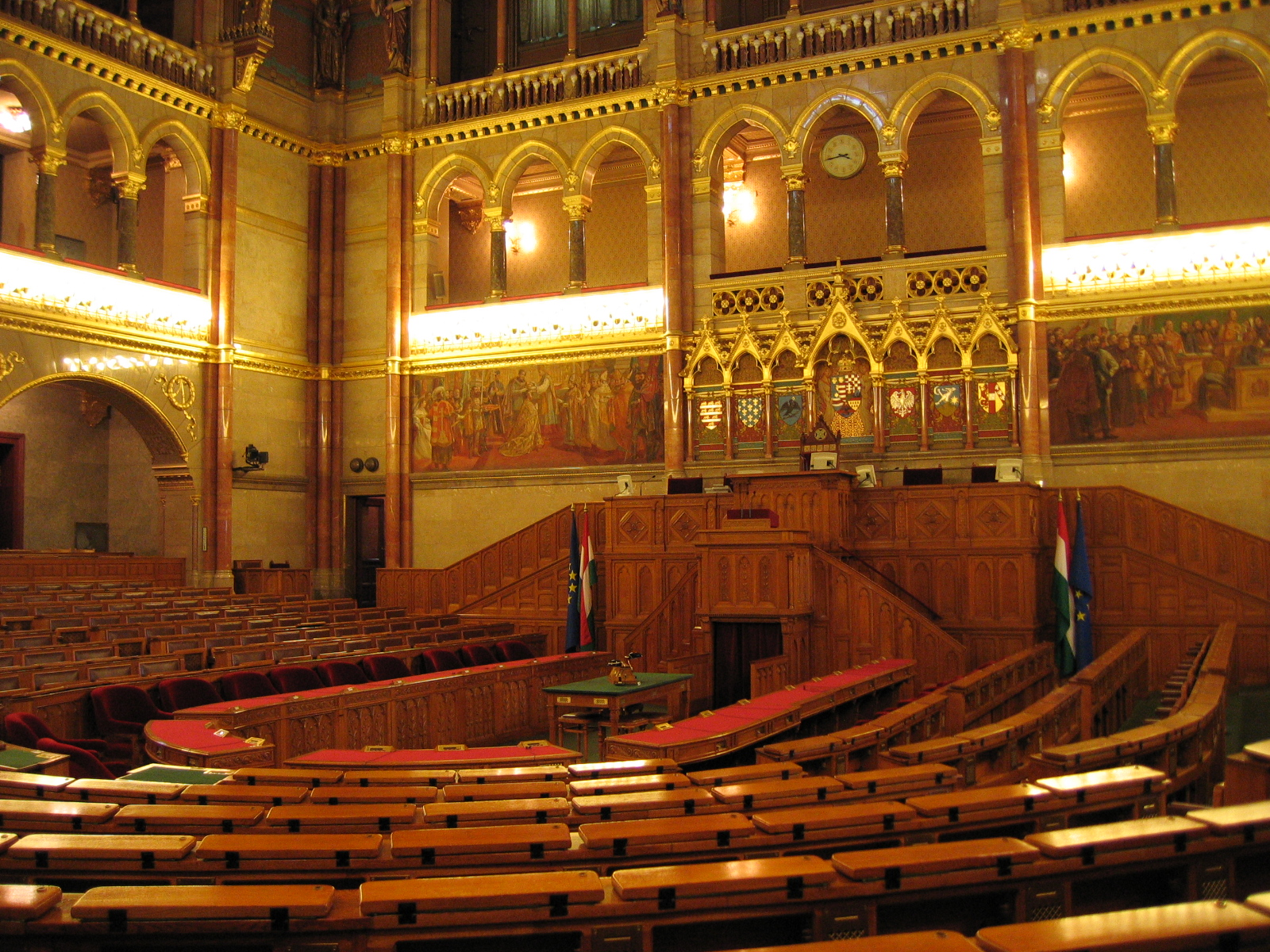
Assembly hall of the House of Representatives

The House of Representatives (Képviselőház) consisted of members elected, under the Electoral Law of 1874, by a complicated franchise based upon property, taxation, profession or official position, and ancestral privileges. The House consisted of 453 members, of which 413 were deputies elected in Hungary and 40 delegates of Croatia-Slavonia sent by the parliament of that Kingdom. Their terms were for five years and were remunerated.

The Encyclopædia Britannica Eleventh Edition considered the franchise "probably the most illiberal in Europe". The working classes were wholly unrepresented in the parliament, only 6% of them, and 13% of the small trading class, possessing the franchise, which was only enjoyed by 6% of the entire population.

The parliament was summoned annually by the king in Budapest. While the official language was Hungarian, the delegates of Croatia-Slavonia were allowed to use the Croatian language in the proceedings. The Hungarian parliament had the power to legislate on all matters concerning Hungary, but for Croatia-Slavonia only on matters which it shared with Hungary. Executive power was vested in a cabinet responsible to it, consisting of ten ministers, including: the president of the council, the minister for Croatia-Slavonia, a minister ad latum, and the ministers of the interior, of national defence, of education and public worship, of finance, of agriculture, of industry and commerce, and of justice. The King had the power to veto all legislation passed by the Diet and also to dissolve it and call new elections. Additionally, before any bill could be presented to the Diet, the Emperor-King had to give his Royal Assent. All this shows that the Head of State still had huge power, which however he chose not to use in order to give the Hungarians more control over their own affairs.

According to Randalph Braham, the increasingly illiberal nature of the Diet, leading into World War II, over the period from 1867 and 1944, continues to be a sticking point in regional cultural and political conflicts to this day. The population fluctuated from 6.7% having the franchise in 1848, to 5% having the franchise in 1874, reaching a peak of 8% at the beginning of World War I, with significant police and other pressure on the vote to remain highly partisan. By the start of World War I in 1910, despite the region having a population that was approximately 54.5% Magyar 16.1% Romanian and 10.6% Slovak, 405 out of 413 representatives were of Hungarian descent, with 5 Romanian and 3 Slovak representatives making up the difference.

The Austro-Hungarian compromise and its supporting liberal parliamentary parties remained bitterly unpopular among the ethnic Hungarian voters, and the continuous successes of these pro-compromise liberal parties in the Hungarian parliamentary elections caused long lasting frustration among Hungarian voters. The ethnic minorities had the key role in the political maintenance of the Austro-Hungarian Compromise in Hungary, because they were able to vote the pro-compromise liberal parties into the position of the majority/ruling parties of the Hungarian parliament. The pro-compromise liberal parties were the most popular among ethnic minority voters, however i.e. the Slovak, Serb and Romanian minority parties remained unpopular among their own ethnic minority voters. The coalitions of Hungarian nationalist parties – which were supported by the overwhelming majority of ethnic Hungarian voters – always remained in the opposition, with the exception of the 1906–1910 period, where the Hungarian-supported nationalist parties were able to form a government.

== See also ==
- Imperial Council (Austria)
- Diet of Dalmatia
- Indigenat (Hungary)
