= Flipper Öcsi =

Hungarian singer (1962–2008)

Béla Tibor Jeszenszky a.k.a. Flipper Öcsi (1962–2008) was a Hungarian singer and rock musician. His band, Dolly Roll, achieved major success in Hungary, gaining multiple platinum albums. He played rhythm guitar and sang. He died in 2008 due to complications brought on by his longstanding alcoholism.

== Early life ==
He's one of descendants of the noble Jeszenszky (Slovak: Jesensky) family. His maternal half-sister, Viki Marót (Viktória Marót) (b.: 1983) is singer, too.
