= Indygenat =

Process of granting nobility to foreign nobles in the Polish-Lithuanian Commonwealth

Indygenat (from Latin: indigenatus) was the incorporation of a foreign noble into the szlachta, the nobility of the Kingdom of Poland and the Polish–Lithuanian Commonwealth. It can be described as a form of naturalization of nobles, making them "indigenous". It should be distinguished from nobilitacja (ennoblement) which was the elevation of a non-noble person to noble status.

To grant indygenat, a foreign noble had to submit proof of their service to the Kingdom, or later to the Commonwealth, together with proof of nobility issued by a foreign court, swear an oath of allegiance, and buy land. Grants of indygenat were limited in the history of Poland to 451 foreign nobles. An indygenat was initially conferred by the King; after 1607 it was only valid with approval of the Sejm of the Polish–Lithuanian Commonwealth.

== See also ==
- Indigenat (disambiguation)
- Ennoblement
- Heraldic adoption
- Skartabellat
