= Jan Jesenský =

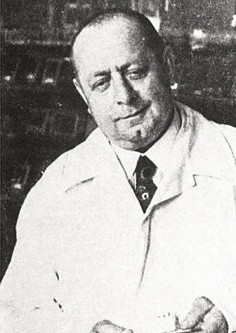
Professor Jan Jesenský

Jan Jesenský (1870 in Prague – 1947 in Prague), professor (1911) of stomatology at Prague University.

He was the founder and head of the Prague Stomatology Clinic until the German occupation in 1939 and a member of the Bohemian Academy. He was a member of International Association for Dental Research (IADR), which he became Honorary Vice-President from 1933–1935, and co-founder of its Prague Section in 1932. He created the Dental Museum at the Charles University in Prague in 1906.

He worked with his nephew, Jan Jesenský Jr.

His daughter was the writer Milena Jesenská.

== See also ==
- House of Jeszenszky
- Jiří Jesenský (nephew)
