= Milena Jesenská =

Czech journalist, writer, editor and translator

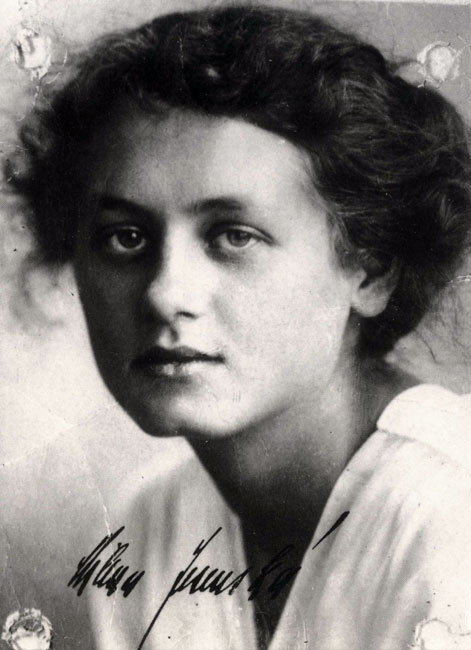
- Jesenská in the 1920s
- Born: 10 August 1896; Prague, Austria-Hungary
- Died: 17 May 1944 (aged 47); Ravensbrück, Germany
- Occupations: Journalist, writer, editor, translator
- Known for: Resistance activities during the occupation of Czechoslovakia
- Spouses: Ernst Pollak (m. 1918; div. 1925); Jaromír Krejcar (m. 1927)
- Children: Jana Černá

Milena Jesenská (Czech: [ˈmɪlɛna ˈjɛsɛnskaː]; 10 August 1896 – 17 May 1944) was a Czech journalist, writer, editor and translator. She is noted for her correspondence with the author Franz Kafka and was one of the first to translate his work from the German language. After the Nazi invasion of Czechoslovakia, she joined a resistance movement to help Jews and other refugees. She died in Ravensbrück, a Nazi prison camp.

== Early life ==
Jesenská was born in Prague, Austria-Hungary (now Czech Republic). Her family is believed to descend from Jan Jesenius, the first professor of medicine at Prague's Charles University who was among the 27 Bohemian luminaries executed in the Old Town Square in Prague on 21 June 1621 for defying the authority of the Habsburgs King Ferdinand II. However, this belief has been challenged as unfounded. Jesenská's father Jan was a dental surgeon and professor at Charles University in Prague; her mother Milena Hejzlarová died when Milena was 16. Jesenská studied at Minerva, the first academic gymnasium for girls in the Austro-Hungarian Empire. After graduation she enrolled briefly at the Prague Conservatory and at the Faculty of Medicine but abandoned her studies after two semesters. In 1918 she married Ernst Pollak, a Jewish intellectual and literary critic whom she met in Prague's literary circles, and moved with him to Vienna. The marriage, which allegedly caused her to break off relations with her father for several years, was an unhappy one.

== Career ==
Since Pollak's earnings were initially inadequate to support the pair in the city's war-torn economy, Jesenská had to supplement their household income by working as a translator. In 1919 she discovered a short story (The Stoker) by Prague writer Franz Kafka, and wrote to him to ask for permission to translate it from German to Czech. The letter launched an intense and increasingly passionate correspondence. Jesenská and Kafka met twice: they spent four days in Vienna together and later a day in Gmünd. Eventually Kafka broke off the relationship, partly because Jesenská was unable to leave her husband, and their almost daily communication ceased abruptly in November 1920. They meant so much to each other, however, that they did exchange a few more letters in 1922 and 1923 (and Kafka turned over to Jesenská his diaries at the end of his life). Jesenská's translation of The Stoker was a first translation of Kafka's writings into Czech (and as a matter of fact, into any foreign language); later she translated two other short stories by Kafka and also texts by Hermann Broch, Franz Werfel, Upton Sinclair, and many others. Jaroslav Dohnal, the name given for the translator of the Czech edition of Kafka's short-story "Reflections for Gentlemen-Jockeys", is most likely a pseudonym for Jesenská.

In Vienna, Jesenská also began to write herself, contributing articles and later also editorials to women's columns in some of the best known Prague dailies and magazines. For example, she contributed to Tribuna, and between 1923 and 1926, she wrote for Národní listy, Pestrý týden and Lidové noviny.

In 1925 Jesenská divorced Pollak and moved back to Prague, where she later met and married avant-garde Czech architect Jaromír Krejcar, with whom she had a daughter, Jana Černá. In Prague she continued working as a journalist, writing for newspapers and magazines, and also as children's books editor and translator. Some of her articles from the period were published in two separate collections by the Prague Publishing House Topič. In October 1934 her second marriage ended - she gave a consent to divorce Krejcar so that he could marry a Latvian interpreter whom he met during his visit to the Soviet Union.

In the 1930s Jesenská became attracted to communism. In 1931, Jesenská joined the Communist Party of Czechoslovakia though she was later expelled in the mid-'30s for making critical comments about Stalinism, being deemed a "Trotskyist." She would later go on to critique Joseph Stalin and the USSR further for not opposing the Third Reich's expansion before 1941 and rather acting in "state interests." She likewise disapproved of many Czechslovakian communist officials and rebuked the Communist Party for its conformism and subservience to the USSR.

Between 1938 and 1939 she edited the prestigious Czech magazine for politics and culture Přítomnost (The Presence), founded and published in Prague by the esteemed political commentator and democrat Ferdinand Peroutka. Here she wrote editorials and visionary commentaries on the rise of the Nazi Party in Germany, the Anschluss of Austria to Nazi Germany and the possible consequences this was to have for Czechoslovakia.

== Death ==
After the occupation of Czechoslovakia by the German army, Jesenská joined an underground resistance movement and helped many Jews and communists emigrate. She herself decided to stay, despite the consequences.

In November 1939, she was arrested by the Gestapo and imprisoned first in Prague's Pankrác Prison and later in Dresden. In October 1940, she was deported to a concentration camp in Ravensbrück in Germany. There she provided moral support to other prisoners and befriended Margarete Buber-Neumann, who wrote her first biography after the war. Like other inmates, Jesenská was tattooed with an identity number in the camp - in her case the number was "4714". She nevertheless was given the nickname "4711" ("Siebenundvierzig-elf") by other detainees, a reference to a brand of Eau de Cologne which was, at the time, one of Germany's best known brands. Jesenská died of kidney failure, in Ravensbrück, on 17 May 1944.

On December 14, 1994, Yad Vashem recognized Milena Jesenská as Righteous Among the Nations.

== Milena Jesenská's daughter ==
Jana "Honza" Krejcarová, the daughter of Jesenská and Jaromír Krejcar, was a writer for the Czech underground publication Půlnoc in the early 1950s and for Divoké víno in the 1960s. In 1969 her biography of her mother was printed under the title Adresát Milena Jesenská. "Written at a time when the new freedom that had dawned in Czechoslovakia under Dubček was already doomed, it was rushed to the printer unedited and unchecked [...]. In the event it was too late to escape the clamp-down; the book never reached the Prague shops and only the odd copy was smuggled out of the country."

== In music ==
Jesenská was the subject of a cantata for soprano and orchestra, entitled Milena, by the Argentine composer Alberto Ginastera. Ginastera's work was based on Kafka's letters.

British Industrial musician Bryn Jones, under the moniker of Muslimgauze, included a track named after her in his album Opaques.

French singer-songwriter, Dominique A, wrote a song dedicated to Milena Jesenská in the song "Milena Jesenská" of his 1998 single Ep "L'Attirance" (Ovni Records - Acuarela).

American singer-songwriter, Rhett Miller, mentions Milena in the song "Our Love" of his 2002 debut album "The Instigator".

French-American musical group Moriarty referenced Milena in the song called "Za Milena J." of his 2015 album "Epitaph" and her relationship with Franz Kafka.

== In popular culture ==
The 2025 novel "Letters To Kafka" by Christine Estima explores the life of Milena Jesenská from a first-person point of view, imagining what her letters to Kafka might have said, and also her role as a resistance fighter during the rise of fascism in Europe in the 1930s. The novel is published by House of Anansi Press and was published September 9, 2025.

In 2025, Gwen Strauss write the love story of Milena and Margarete in the Ravensbruck camp.

== Works ==
Anthologies of Jesenská's texts and articles published during her lifetime:

- Cesta k jednoduchosti ("The Road to Simplicity"). Praha: Topič, 1926.
- Člověk dělá šaty ("Man Makes Clothes"). Praha: Topič, 1927.

Anthologies of Jesenská's texts, articles, and correspondence published after her death:

- Ludmila Hegnerová, ed. Milena Jesenská zvenčí a zevnitř: Antologie textů Mileny Jesenské. (Anthology of Jesenská's texts.) Praha: Prostor, 1996.
- Václav Burian, ed. Nad naše síly: Češi, židé a Němci 1937-1939. (Articles published in Přítomnost). Olomouc: Votobia, 1997.
- Kathleen Hayes, ed. The Journalism of Milena Jesenska: A Critical Voice in Interwar Central Europe. Translated from Czech and with an introduction by Kathleen Hayes. New York: Berghahn Books, 2003.
- Alena Wágnerová, ed. Dopisy Mileny Jesenské. (Jesenská's letters.) Prague: Prostor, 1998.

== Selected bibliography ==
- Jana Černá. Adresát Milena Jesenská, Prague 1969.
- Jana Černá. Kafka’s Milena, London: Souvenir Books, 1988.
- Mary Hockaday. Kafka, Love, and Courage: The Life of Milena Jesenská. New York: The Overlook Press, 1997. ISBN 0-87951-731-X
- Margarete Buber-Neumann. Milena: The Tragic Story of Kafka's Great Love. Arcade Publishing, 1997. ISBN 1-55970-390-3
- Kafka, Franz. Letters to Milena. Translated by Philip Boehm, New York City: Schocken Books, 1990. ISBN 0-8052-0885-2
- Gwen Strauss. Milena and Margarete, 2025. ISBN 978-1-78512-709-0
